= List of Cobra Kai episodes =

Cobra Kai is an American comedy-drama and martial arts television series. The series is a direct continuation and spin-off of the first four films in The Karate Kid franchise, and initially picks up almost 34 years after the 1984 titular film. The series' first season premiered on the streaming service YouTube Red on May 2, 2018, followed by a second season the following year on April 24, on the renamed YouTube Premium. YouTube initially renewed and produced a third season of the series to release in 2020, but was not interested in developing any further seasons due to a shift from scripted to unscripted programming. As a result, distributor Sony Pictures Television opted to look for a new service to stream the series. Among other streaming services, Hulu and Netflix were named as possible new networks for the series.

In 2020 it was ultimately announced that Netflix had purchased the completed third season, while YouTube and Netflix would share non-exclusive streaming rights to the first two seasons. Netflix held the series until 2021 and started production on a fourth season. The third season, initially set to release on January 8, was released a week earlier on January 1 to coincide with New Year's Day. The fourth season streamed later that year on December 31. A fifth season followed on September 9, 2022. In January 2023, Netflix renewed Cobra Kai for a sixth and final season, set to stream in December of that year. Amid the 2023 Writers' Guild of America strike and the 2023 SAG-AFTRA strike, the season was initially delayed to 2024. Netflix later announced that the final season would consist of 15 episodes and be released in three parts of five episodes; the first on July 18, 2024, followed by the second on November 28, and the final part on February 13, 2025. The release date of part two was later changed to November 15.

Ralph Macchio and William Zabka returned from the film series as Daniel LaRusso and Johnny Lawrence respectively. New actors to the franchise include Xolo Maridueña, Mary Mouser, Tanner Buchanan, and Courtney Henggeler. Peyton List, Jacob Bertrand, Gianni DeCenzo, Vanessa Rubio, and Dallas Dupree Young were all added to the main cast in later seasons after recurring in earlier ones. Additionally, Martin Kove returned to the franchise to portray John Kreese with a main role beginning in the second season after a guest role at the end of the first, while Thomas Ian Griffith reprised his role as Terry Silver beginning in the fourth. Other characters from the film series have appeared as guest stars and recurring characters. A sixth feature film, Karate Kid: Legends (2025), was released after the series concluded and ties into the 2010 reboot film, with Macchio reprising his role as Daniel LaRusso.

Cobra Kai has received critical acclaim, receiving nominations for multiple People's Choice and Emmy awards. It also topped viewership charts on both YouTube and Netflix with each respective season's release.

During the course of the series, 65 episodes of Cobra Kai were released over six seasons, concluding on February 13, 2025.

== Series overview ==
Season	Episodes		Originally released	Network
1	10		May 2, 2018	YouTube Red
2	10		April 24, 2019	YouTube Premium
3	10		January 1, 2021	Netflix
4	10		December 31, 2021	Netflix
5	10		September 9, 2022	Netflix
6	15	5	July 18, 2024	Netflix
6	15	5	November 15, 2024	Netflix
6	15	5	February 13, 2025	Netflix

== Episodes ==
=== Season 1 (2018) ===
Cobra Kai season 1 episodes
No. overall	No. in season	Title	Directed by	Written by	Original release date
1	1	"Ace Degenerate"	Jon Hurwitz & Hayden Schlossberg	Josh Heald & Jon Hurwitz & Hayden Schlossberg	May 2, 2018
2	2	"Strike First"	Jon Hurwitz & Hayden Schlossberg	Josh Heald & Jon Hurwitz & Hayden Schlossberg	May 2, 2018
3	3	"Esqueleto"	Jennifer Celotta	Josh Heald & Jon Hurwitz & Hayden Schlossberg	May 2, 2018
4	4	"Cobra Kai Never Dies"	Jennifer Celotta	Teleplay by : Jason Belleville; Story by : Josh Heald & Jon Hurwitz & Hayden Schlossberg	May 2, 2018
5	5	"Counterbalance"	Josh Heald	Josh Heald & Jon Hurwitz & Hayden Schlossberg	May 2, 2018
6	6	"Quiver"	Josh Heald	Teleplay by : Joe Piarulli & Luan Thomas; Story by : Josh Heald & Jon Hurwitz & Hayden Schlossberg & Joe Piarulli & Luan Thomas	May 2, 2018
7	7	"All Valley"	Steve Pink	Teleplay by : Stacey Harman; Story by : Josh Heald & Jon Hurwitz & Hayden Schlossberg & Stacey Harman	May 2, 2018
8	8	"Molting"	Steve Pink	Teleplay by : Michael Jonathan Smith; Story by : Josh Heald & Jon Hurwitz & Hayden Schlossberg & Michael Jonathan Smith	May 2, 2018
9	9	"Different but Same"	Jon Hurwitz & Hayden Schlossberg	Teleplay by : Jason Belleville; Story by : Josh Heald & Jon Hurwitz & Hayden Schlossberg & Jason Belleville	May 2, 2018
10	10	"Mercy"	Jon Hurwitz & Hayden Schlossberg	Josh Heald & Jon Hurwitz & Hayden Schlossberg	May 2, 2018

=== Season 2 (2019) ===
Cobra Kai season 2 episodes
No. overall	No. in season	Title	Directed by	Written by	Original release date
11	1	"Mercy Part II"	Jon Hurwitz & Hayden Schlossberg	Josh Heald & Jon Hurwitz & Hayden Schlossberg	April 24, 2019
12	2	"Back in Black"	Jon Hurwitz & Hayden Schlossberg	Josh Heald & Jon Hurwitz & Hayden Schlossberg	April 24, 2019
13	3	"Fire and Ice"	Michael Grossman	Teleplay by : Stacey Harman; Story by : Josh Heald & Jon Hurwitz & Hayden Schlossberg & Stacey Harman	April 24, 2019
14	4	"The Moment of Truth"	Michael Grossman	Teleplay by : Kevin McManus & Matthew McManus; Story by : Josh Heald & Jon Hurwitz & Hayden Schlossberg & Kevin McManus & Matthew McManus	April 24, 2019
15	5	"All In"	Josh Heald	Josh Heald & Jon Hurwitz & Hayden Schlossberg	April 24, 2019
16	6	"Take a Right"	Josh Heald	Josh Heald & Jon Hurwitz & Hayden Schlossberg	April 24, 2019
17	7	"Lull"	Jennifer Celotta	Teleplay by : Kevin McManus & Matthew McManus; Story by : Josh Heald & Jon Hurwitz & Hayden Schlossberg & Kevin McManus & Matthew McManus	April 24, 2019
18	8	"Glory of Love"	Jennifer Celotta	Teleplay by : Joe Piarulli & Luan Thomas; Story by : Josh Heald & Jon Hurwitz & Hayden Schlossberg & Joe Piarulli & Luan Thomas	April 24, 2019
19	9	"Pulpo"	Jon Hurwitz & Hayden Schlossberg	Teleplay by : Michael Jonathan Smith; Story by : Josh Heald & Jon Hurwitz & Hayden Schlossberg & Michael Jonathan Smith	April 24, 2019
20	10	"No Mercy"	Jon Hurwitz & Hayden Schlossberg	Teleplay by : Joe Piarulli & Luan Thomas; Story by : Josh Heald & Jon Hurwitz & Hayden Schlossberg & Joe Piarulli & Luan Thomas	April 24, 2019

=== Season 3 (2021) ===
Cobra Kai season 3 episodes
No. overall	No. in season	Title	Directed by	Written by	Original release date
21	1	"Aftermath"	Jon Hurwitz & Hayden Schlossberg	Josh Heald & Jon Hurwitz & Hayden Schlossberg	January 1, 2021
22	2	"Nature vs. Nurture"	Jon Hurwitz & Hayden Schlossberg	Teleplay by : Joe Piarulli & Luan Thomas; Story by : Josh Heald & Jon Hurwitz & Hayden Schlossberg & Joe Piarulli & Luan Thomas	January 1, 2021
23	3	"Now You're Gonna Pay"	Lin Oeding	Teleplay by : Stacey Harman; Story by : Josh Heald & Jon Hurwitz & Hayden Schlossberg & Stacey Harman	January 1, 2021
24	4	"The Right Path"	Lin Oeding	Teleplay by : Michael Jonathan Smith; Story by : Josh Heald & Jon Hurwitz & Hayden Schlossberg & Michael Jonathan Smith	January 1, 2021
25	5	"Miyagi-Do"	Steven Tsuchida	Teleplay by : Bob Dearden; Story by : Josh Heald & Jon Hurwitz & Hayden Schlossberg & Bob Dearden	January 1, 2021
26	6	"King Cobra"	Steven Tsuchida	Teleplay by : Joe Piarulli & Luan Thomas; Story by : Josh Heald & Jon Hurwitz & Hayden Schlossberg & Joe Piarulli & Luan Thomas	January 1, 2021
27	7	"Obstáculos"	Jennifer Celotta	Teleplay by : Alyssa Forleiter; Story by : Josh Heald & Jon Hurwitz & Hayden Schlossberg & Alyssa Forleiter	January 1, 2021
28	8	"The Good, the Bad, and the Badass"	Jennifer Celotta	Teleplay by : Mattea Greene; Story by : Josh Heald & Jon Hurwitz & Hayden Schlossberg & Mattea Greene	January 1, 2021
29	9	"Feel the Night"	Josh Heald	Teleplay by : Michael Jonathan Smith; Story by : Josh Heald & Jon Hurwitz & Hayden Schlossberg & Michael Jonathan Smith	January 1, 2021
30	10	"December 19"	Josh Heald	Teleplay by : Bob Dearden; Story by : Josh Heald & Jon Hurwitz & Hayden Schlossberg & Bob Dearden	January 1, 2021

=== Season 4 (2021) ===
Cobra Kai season 4 episodes
No. overall	No. in season	Title	Directed by	Written by	Original release date
31	1	"Let's Begin"	Jon Hurwitz & Hayden Schlossberg	Josh Heald & Jon Hurwitz & Hayden Schlossberg	December 31, 2021 (Note: Prior to its release on Netflix, a virtual premiere screening of "Let's Begin" was held on December 28, 2021.)
32	2	"First Learn Stand"	Jon Hurwitz & Hayden Schlossberg	Joe Piarulli & Luan Thomas	December 31, 2021
33	3	"Then Learn Fly"	Marielle Woods	Michael Jonathan Smith	December 31, 2021
34	4	"Bicephaly"	Marielle Woods	Stacey Harman	December 31, 2021
35	5	"Match Point"	Joel Novoa	Bob Dearden	December 31, 2021
36	6	"Kicks Get Chicks"	Joel Novoa	Mattea Greene	December 31, 2021
37	7	"Minefields"	Tawnia McKiernan	Bill Posley	December 31, 2021
38	8	"Party Time"	Tawnia McKiernan	Joe Piarulli & Luan Thomas	December 31, 2021
39	9	"The Fall"	Josh Heald	Michael Jonathan Smith	December 31, 2021
40	10	"The Rise"	Josh Heald	Bob Dearden	December 31, 2021

=== Season 5 (2022) ===
Cobra Kai season 5 episodes
No. overall	No. in season	Title	Directed by	Written by	Original release date
41	1	"Long, Long Way from Home"	Joel Novoa & Steven Tsuchida	Michael Jonathan Smith	September 9, 2022
42	2	"Molé"	Steven Tsuchida	Joe Piarulli & Luan Thomas	September 9, 2022
43	3	"Playing with Fire"	Marielle Woods	Mattea Greene	September 9, 2022
44	4	"Downward Spiral"	Steve Pink	Ashley Darnall	September 9, 2022
45	5	"Extreme Measures"	Jennifer Celotta	Bob Dearden	September 9, 2022
46	6	"Ouroboros"	Joel Novoa	Michael Jonathan Smith	September 9, 2022
47	7	"Bad Eggs"	Joel Novoa	Joe Piarulli & Luan Thomas	September 9, 2022
48	8	"Taikai"	Marielle Woods	Ashley Darnall	September 9, 2022
49	9	"Survivors"	Steven Tsuchida	Michael Jonathan Smith	September 9, 2022
50	10	"Head of the Snake"	Joel Novoa	Bob Dearden	September 9, 2022

=== Season 6 (2024–2025) ===
Cobra Kai season 6 episodes
No. overall	No. in season	Title	Directed by	Written by	Original release date
Part 1
51	1	"Peacetime in the Valley"	Joel Novoa	Bob Dearden	July 18, 2024
52	2	"The Prize"	Joel Novoa	Joe Piarulli & Luan Thomas	July 18, 2024
53	3	"Sleeper"	Ralph Macchio	Mattea Greene	July 18, 2024
54	4	"Underdogs"	Sherwin Shilati	Chris Rafferty	July 18, 2024
55	5	"Best of the Best"	Sherwin Shilati	Michael Jonathan Smith	July 18, 2024
Part 2
56	6	"Benvinguts a Barcelona"	Joel Novoa	Joe Piarulli & Luan Thomas	November 15, 2024
57	7	"Dog in the Fight"	Joel Novoa	Ashley Darnall	November 15, 2024
58	8	"Snakes on a Plane"	Jennifer Celotta	Ashley Darnall & Emily Abbott	November 15, 2024
59	9	"Blood In Blood Out"	Sherwin Shilati	Chris Rafferty	November 15, 2024
60	10	"Eunjangdo"	Sherwin Shilati	Bob Dearden & Olga Lexell	November 15, 2024
Part 3
61	11	"Into the Fire"	Joe Piarulli	Joe Piarulli & Luan Thomas	February 13, 2025
62	12	"Rattled"	William Zabka	Ashley Darnall & Kyle Civale	February 13, 2025
63	13	"Skeletons"	Joel Novoa	Chris Rafferty	February 13, 2025
64	14	"Strike Last"	Josh Heald	Bob Dearden	February 13, 2025
65	15	"Ex-Degenerate"	Jon Hurwitz & Hayden Schlossberg	Josh Heald & Jon Hurwitz & Hayden Schlossberg	February 13, 2025
