= Cobra Kai season 4 =

Cobra Kai
- Season 4
- Promotional poster
- Showrunners: Josh Heald; Jon Hurwitz; Hayden Schlossberg
- Starring: Ralph Macchio; William Zabka; Courtney Henggeler; Xolo Maridueña; Tanner Buchanan; Mary Mouser; Jacob Bertrand; Gianni DeCenzo; Peyton List; Vanessa Rubio; Thomas Ian Griffith; Martin Kove
- No. of episodes: 10

Release
- Original network: Netflix
- Original release: December 31, 2021

Season chronology
- ← Previous; Season 3 Next → Season 5

The fourth season of Cobra Kai, also known as Cobra Kai IV, released on Netflix on December 31, 2021, and consisted of 10 episodes. The series is a sequel to the original films of The Karate Kid franchise, focusing on the characters of Daniel LaRusso and Johnny Lawrence over 30 years after the original film. It is the second season to be released in 2021 and second to initially release on Netflix after the first two seasons released on YouTube. The season was also released on DVD on September 13, 2022, a few days after the premiere of the show's fifth season.

The season witnesses Johnny and Daniel, as well as their students, put aside their differences in order to defeat Cobra Kai at the All-Valley Tournament, with the losing dojo being forced to disband. In order to combat the new threat, Kreese invites his old friend Terry Silver in order to take down Johnny and Daniel, but inadvertently unleashes a greater threat.

The season has twelve starring roles, nine of which returned from the previous season, an additional two were added to main cast after recurring throughout previous seasons, and one was added as a newcomer to the series reprising his role from the film series. The season also featured guest appearances from other characters in the film series, re-introducing two recurring characters after a season-long absence, and featuring a cameo appearance from Carrie Underwood. The fourth season was filmed in early 2021. Two soundtrack albums feature accompanying music from the season and were released on January 7, 2022. The season received positive reviews from critics and also topped Netflix's global viewership charts within three days of its release.

== Cast and characters ==
=== Main ===
- Ralph Macchio as Daniel LaRusso
- William Zabka as Johnny Lawrence
- Courtney Henggeler as Amanda LaRusso
- Xolo Maridueña as Miguel Diaz
- Tanner Buchanan as Robby Keene
- Mary Mouser as Samantha LaRusso
- Jacob Bertrand as Eli "Hawk" Moskowitz
- Gianni DeCenzo as Demetri Alexopoulos
- Peyton List as Tory Nichols
- Vanessa Rubio as Carmen Diaz
- Thomas Ian Griffith as Terry Silver
- Martin Kove as John Kreese

=== Recurring ===
- Joe Seo as Kyler Park
- Griffin Santopietro as Anthony LaRusso
- Rose Bianco as Rosa Diaz
- Aedin Mincks as Mitch
- Khalil Everage as Chris
- Owen Morgan as Bert
- Nathaniel Oh as Nathaniel
- Dallas Dupree Young as Kenny Payne
- Milena Rivero as Lia Cabrera
- Brock Duncan as Zack Thompson
- Hannah Kepple as Moon Taylor
- Oona O'Brien as Devon Lee
- Selah Austria as Piper Elswith

=== Notable guests ===
- Okea Eme-Akwari as Shawn Payne
- Dan Ahdoot as Anoush Norouzi
- Barrett Carnahan as young John Kreese
- Nick Marini as young Terry Silver
- Bret Ernst as Louie LaRusso Jr.
- Annalisa Cochrane as Yasmine
- Nichole Brown as Aisha Robinson
- Susan Gallagher as "Homeless" Lynn
- Paul Walter Hauser as Raymond "Stingray" Porter
- Diora Baird as Shannon Keene
- Randee Heller as Lucille LaRusso
- Julia Macchio as Vanessa LaRusso
- Carrie Underwood as herself
- Yuji Okumoto as Chozen Toguchi

== Episodes ==
Cobra Kai season 4 episodes
No. overall	No. in season	Title	Directed by	Written by	Original release date
31	1	"Let's Begin"	Jon Hurwitz & Hayden Schlossberg	Josh Heald & Jon Hurwitz & Hayden Schlossberg	December 31, 2021 (Note: Prior to its release on Netflix, a virtual premiere screening of "Let's Begin" was held on December 28, 2021.)
Eagle Fang and Miyagi-Do begin training together in an effort to beat Cobra Kai, but Johnny and Daniel disagree on the best way to prepare their students. After Carmen finds out about Johnny and Ali hanging out, she tells him she wants to take things slowly. Kreese gets in contact with Terry Silver and invites him to come back to Cobra Kai. Silver declines, claiming he has found peace with his girlfriend Cheyenne in his lavish lifestyle since leaving Cobra Kai decades before. (Note: As depicted in The Karate Kid Part III (1989)) Daniel proposes to Johnny that Eagle Fang should integrate into Miyagi-Do, but Johnny disagrees, causing the two to agree that the two dojos should split up. Kreese persuades Robby to join Cobra Kai, and Robby leads the other students by teaching them Miyagi-do Karate to have an advantage. Hawk initially faces resistance from the other Eagle Fang and Miyagi-Do students; however, after he proposes that he and the other students build an Okinawan sparring deck on spare land at the dojo for practice sessions, they begin to accept him. The unity between the two dojos prompts Daniel and Johnny to agree and continue working together. Silver later contemplates returning to Cobra Kai. Note: This episode is dedicated in memory of Ed Asner.
32	2	"First Learn Stand"	Jon Hurwitz & Hayden Schlossberg	Joe Piarulli & Luan Thomas	December 31, 2021
New student Kenny Payne prepares for his first day of school by himself and gets bullied by the other students, including Daniel's son Anthony LaRusso. Daniel and Johnny each agree to take a day of training to understand the other's style of teaching better. Amanda visits Tory's work and warns her to stay away from Sam, which inadvertently gets her fired. Robby and Kreese continue training the other Cobra Kai students in Miyagi-Do but with their own twist on it. Kenny's classmates and Anthony trick him into cosplaying, causing him to get into a fight with them, but he runs away. Daniel's Eagle Fang training leads him to a fight with hockey players. Amanda buys Tory groceries after learning about her home situation from Kreese, but Tory rejects them, leading to a confrontation at the car dealership. Kenny, looking for help from his bullies, visits his older brother, Shawn Payne, in the juvenile detention center. Shawn suggests that Kenny seek help from Robby.
33	3	"Then Learn Fly"	Marielle Woods	Michael Jonathan Smith	December 31, 2021
Daniel and his family, including Miguel, Johnny, and Carmen, have dinner together, where they discuss Miguel and Sam's future. Daniel and Johnny trade students so that each gets both Miyagi-Do and Eagle Fang training. When Kenny visits Cobra Kai to seek help from Robby, Kreese rejects him as a student, saying he is too weak. Carmen has trouble with her car, and Daniel offers to tow and fix it himself. Silver visits Kreese and blames him for disturbing his peace of mind. Although initially saying he was too busy, Robby agrees to teach Kenny some karate to help him defend himself, advising him to use his speed as a strength. Silver reflects on early Cobra Kai days with Kreese following their time together in the military. Johnny informs Carmen that he does not want to take things slowly, and she agrees. Kenny again visits the Cobra Kai dojo and finally convinces Kreese to allow him to train there. Silver then decides to rejoin Cobra Kai.
34	4	"Bicephaly"	Marielle Woods	Stacey Harman	December 31, 2021
Johnny gets frustrated at Daniel when he and Miguel grow closer. Kenny's middle school gets a tour of the high school, where he runs into Miyagi-Do and Eagle Fang students who encourage him to leave Cobra Kai. Kreese introduces his students to Silver, informing them that he will also join the dojo as a sensei. Carmen wants to tell Miguel about her relationship with Johnny, but he disagrees. She tells Johnny to let Miguel know when he is ready. Tory begins her new job at a children's entertainment venue. Robby provides Kenny with additional one-on-one training, but they are interrupted by Silver, who inspires Robby. Johnny contemplates how to break the news to Miguel and has flashbacks to a similar situation from his childhood. Daniel teaches Miguel how to drive. Amanda and Sam attend a party at the same venue where Tory works, prompting her to quit. Robby confronts Johnny about Kenny, and the conversation quickly turns personal. When Miyagi-Do/Eagle Fang and Cobra Kai students all attend the same drive-in theatre, a fight almost breaks out until Miguel ask them to meet at the baseball field in half an hour. However, it was all just a trap. The Cobra Kai students are doused by sprinklers, and Sam, Miguel, Hawk and Demetri walk away laughing at their rivals after defeating them without having to throw a punch. The next day, Kreese and Silver confront Johnny and Daniel at the Miyagi dojo.
35	5	"Match Point"	Joel Novoa	Bob Dearden	December 31, 2021
Silver attempts to apologize to a petrified Daniel, who asks him and Kreese to leave, while Kreese admonishes Johnny for playing second fiddle to Daniel. Silver then informs Daniel and Johnny that Cobra Kai is imposing a fighting moratorium on their students until the All-Valley Tournament. Daniel tells Johnny about his history with Silver and suggests that he take over the training of all their students. Johnny disagrees and proposes a tournament-style fight between the two, with the first to three points taking over the training. Johnny prepares for the fight while Daniel tries to find a way out of it. Daniel and Sam, Johnny and Miguel, and Kreese and Silver have disagreements on the best way to train for the All-Valley. The Cobra Kai students retaliate for the events that followed the drive-in theatre escalation by shaving off Hawk's mohawk. Daniel and Johnny attempt to reach an agreement for the last time before fighting but ultimately compete against each other. The fight comes to a match point, resulting in a tie, causing the two to split their dojos permanently.
36	6	"Kicks Get Chicks"	Joel Novoa	Mattea Greene	December 31, 2021
During the All-Valley board meeting, the board members argue on nearly every aspect of the tournament before finally reaching a consensus: adding a skills competition and a separate girls division. Miyagi-Do and Cobra Kai embrace the changes quickly and begin strategizing. Meanwhile, Eagle Fang is reluctant to accept them due to lacking female members. Tory is confronted by her aunt, who wants her mother's disability checks. Tory turns to Amanda for help when she wants to re-enroll in school but needs her to agree. Following the shaving incident, a depressed Hawk quits karate altogether despite Demetri's pleas to continue. Johnny and Miguel convince Piper, Moon's ex-girlfriend, to join Eagle Fang. Sam disagrees with Tory's return to school, which leads to an argument between Sam and Amanda. Daniel confronts Robby in a convenience store and fails to have him stand up to Terry. Piper joins Cobra Kai instead. Sam visits Aisha in Santa Barbara for guidance on how to deal with Tory. Following encouragement from Miguel, Johnny continues his recruitment. Hawk, going by Eli again, joins Miyagi-Do after a conversation with Demetri. On Tory's first day back to school, Sam threatens her.
37	7	"Minefields"	Tawnia McKiernan	Bill Posley	December 31, 2021
In the locker room, Anthony steals Kenny's clothes during gym class to embarrass him. As Johnny prepares to tell Miguel about his relationship with Carmen, Miguel begins to suspect the relationship himself. Daniel finds Kenny's Cobra Kai hoodie in Anthony's room and questions him about it. Anthony lies about the hoodie and says Kenny is instigating fights. Kreese and Silver, based on a bet they made, train their students to use weaknesses in their opponents to their advantage. Carmen and Johnny finally tell Miguel about their relationship. Miyagi-Do students and Anthony begin weapons and skills training for the All-Valley. Johnny introduces the Eagle Fang students to Devon Lee, the new female member he recruited from the high school debate team. Johnny refuses to let Miguel train due to injury concerns. Daniel becomes disappointed after Anthony takes shortcuts in his training. Miguel dislikes that Johnny began treating him differently because of his relationship with Carmen. Kenny fights off Anthony and his friends in the middle school library leading to Anthony's suspension and Daniel discovering that Anthony was bullying Kenny. Johnny later decides to let Miguel continue training; they are joined by Sam, who says she wants both Miyagi-Do and Eagle Fang training. Tensions rise between Kreese and Silver over differences between their training styles. Note: This episode is dedicated in memory of Albert Olmstead.
38	8	"Party Time"	Tawnia McKiernan	Joe Piarulli & Luan Thomas	December 31, 2021
Stingray is released from probation and prepares to return to Cobra Kai. The students at Cobra Kai plan for prom as Kreese and Terry train them how to beat their opponents psychologically. Tory asks Robby to be her prom date, and Kreese rejects Stingray's request to rejoin the dojo. Sam and Miguel also plan on attending prom together. Shannon, Robby's mother, tells Johnny that Silver gifted Robby a car and money. Tensions rise at prom when Sam and Miguel become distracted by Robby and Tory. Silver proposes moving Cobra Kai to its original location. Daniel's cousin Vanessa, a psychology student, blames Daniel and Amanda for Anthony's behavior. Silver attacks Johnny to show Kreese his loyalty. Kreese, however, forces Terry to let him go. Stingray hosts an afterparty where a fight breaks out between Sam and Miguel with Tory and Robby. Anthony decides to try to become a better person after getting into trouble with Daniel for using technology while he is grounded. Miguel tends to a drunk Johnny's injuries, where Johnny slurringly says he wants to be a father figure to him but accidentally refers to him as Robby, leaving Miguel heartbroken. A drunken Silver severely beats Stingray when he makes another request to rejoin Cobra Kai.
39	9	"The Fall"	Josh Heald	Michael Jonathan Smith	December 31, 2021
Miyagi-Do, Eagle Fang, and Cobra Kai come head-to-head at the All-Valley Tournament. Daniel, Johnny, and Kreese and Silver each give their respective students a last-minute pep talk before the skills competition begins. Cobra Kai wins the skills competition, followed by Miyagi-Do in second and Eagle Fang in sixth place. Carrie Underwood performs at the tournament before the fighting competition. Eagle Fang loses the female competition when Tory beats Devon in the quarter-finals. When Daniel notices Cobra Kai students using Miyagi-Do moves, he confronts Robby. Eli gains last-minute confidence from Moon and beats Kyler in his match. Sam also wins her match against Piper using combined Miyagi-Do and Eagle Fang skills. Robby and Kenny, despite being classmates, get pitted against each other, and Kenny gets eliminated with a broken nose. In the semi-finals, Miguel and Eli are first to compete against each other, resulting in a pulled back muscle for Miguel.
40	10	"The Rise"	Josh Heald	Bob Dearden	December 31, 2021
Miguel is cleared to fight. Anthony apologizes to Kenny, but his former victim pummels him until he is stopped by Robby, who is disturbed by this. Sam and Tory each advance through the competition to become the last girls standing. Miguel disappears instead of returning to fight, which advances Eli to the final round against Robby. Daniel encourages Eli to use Cobra Kai's moves against Robby. Adding Eagle Fang techniques, Eli wins the boys tournament. After realizing the benefits of their styles, Daniel proposes that he and Johnny create their own combined style of karate called "Miyagi-Fang." The two then encourage Sam to combine the two styles herself. Silver encourages Tory to fight dirty, but Kreese intervenes. Tory wins the match, allowing Cobra Kai to win the tournament overall, and Silver announces his plans to start franchising Cobra Kai. After the match, Tory sees Silver bribing the referee. Robby breaks down about his failure to mentor Kenny to Johnny, and the two reconcile. Kreese gets arrested for Stingray's attack after Silver frames him. Miguel heads to Mexico in search of his biological father, who doesn't know he has a son. Daniel enlists Chozen's help to defeat Cobra Kai once and for all.

== Production ==
=== Development ===
In October 2020, Netflix renewed Cobra Kai for a fourth season prior to the third season's release. The renewal came following Netflix's acquisition of the series after its previous streamer, YouTube, was not interested in renewing the series for a fourth season due to a shift in content focus. Josh Heald, Jon Hurwitz and Hayden Schlossberg returned as writers and executive producers through their production company, Counterbalance Entertainment. Will Smith, James Lassiter and Caleeb Pinkett also returned as executive producers with the Overbrook Entertainment production company. Series stars Ralph Macchio and William Zabka were co-executive producers. Susan Ekins was the executive producer for distributor Sony Pictures Television. Prior to this season's release, Netflix renewed the series for a fifth season in August 2021.

=== Casting ===
All previous series regulars, Ralph Macchio, William Zabka, Courtney Henggeler, Xolo Maridueña, Tanner Buchanan, Mary Mouser, Jacob Bertrand, Gianni DeCenzo and Martin Kove, returned to this season. Peyton List and Vanessa Rubio, who recurred since the second and first seasons respectively, were added to the main cast. Thomas Ian Griffith also joined the main cast as Terry Silver, reprising his role from The Karate Kid Part III. The role for Griffith is his first since 2007 when he turned to writing. Meanwhile, Dallas Dupree Young and Oona O'Brien joined the series in recurring roles to portray Kenny and Devon, two school students who turned to karate. Nichole Brown, who recurred throughout the first two seasons as Aisha Robinson, and Paul Walter Hauser, who recurred in the second season as Stingray, both returned in a guest capacity. Carrie Underwood made a guest appearance in the season as herself, performing a song from the original Karate Kid soundtrack. Yuji Okumoto returned as Chozen Toguchi, and Macchio's daughter, Julia, appeared as Daniel's cousin, Vanessa.

=== Filming ===
Filming for the season began in Atlanta, Georgia, on February 26, 2021. Additional filming took place in Los Angeles, California. Filming concluded on April 30.

=== Music ===
The Def Leppard song "Rock of Ages" was used in a promotional trailer for the season. "The Moment of Truth", a song originally performed by Survivor and written by Bill Conti, Dennis Lambert, and Peter Beckett for the original film, was performed during the season by Carrie Underwood. Heald stated that Underwood was a fan of the series and that her appearance was kept secret until the performance was filmed, causing an authentic reaction from the extras on set. Other featured music from the season included songs from Judas Priest, Poison, Ratt, Journey, Foreigner, and REO Speedwagon, as well as Mötley Crüe's "Girls, Girls, Girls". Hurwitz said the producers also wanted to include music from AC/DC, Bon Jovi, and Guns N' Roses, but were unable to due budget constraints. The Airbourne song "Breakin' Outta Hell", suggested by music supervisor Michelle Johnson, was used in place of AC/DC's "Thunderstruck", a song that was written into the script but was unable to be used, also due to budget concerns.

==== Soundtracks ====
Leo Birenberg and Zach Robinson, who composed for the series since its inception, returned for the season. A promotional single titled "It's Karate Time" was released on December 17, 2021. The soundtrack album was released on January 7, 2022. and consists of two separate volumes, Matt Ryan, who made the vinyl record covers for the previous three seasons, designed the soundtrack's cover art. Madison Gate Records released the two volume soundtrack and La-La Land Records later released an extended CD edition.

===== Volume 1 =====
Cobra Kai: Season 4, Vol.1 "All Valley Tournament 51" (Soundtrack from the Netflix Original Series)
- Album cover

Soundtrack album by Leo Birenberg & Zach Robinson
- Released: January 7, 2022
- Genre: Soundtrack
- Length: 57:42
- Label: Madison Gate
- Producers: Leo Birenberg; Zach Robinson

Leo Birenberg & Zach Robinson chronology
Cobra Kai: Wax Off – EP (2021)	Cobra Kai: Season 4, Vol.1 "All Valley Tournament 51" (Soundtrack from the Netflix Original Series) (2022)	Cobra Kai: Season 4, Vol.2 (Soundtrack from the Netflix Original Series) (2022)

Singles from Cobra Kai: Season 4, Vol.1 "All Valley Tournament 51"
- 1. "It's Karate Time" Released: December 17, 2021

All music is composed by Leo Birenberg & Zach Robinson, except where noted.

No.	Title	Length
1.	"It's Karate Time"	3:26
2.	"Dueling Speeches"	1:11
3.	"Marching Orders"	1:08
4.	"The Thrill of Skills" (Brienberg, Robinson, Maxwell Karmazyn)	2:59
5.	"Dark Miyagi-Do"	1:07
6.	"We're Just Getting Started"	1:03
7.	"Passion and Principle"	1:14
8.	"My Right Way"	1:45
9.	"Mecha-Robby"	1:15
10.	"Killer Instinct"	1:56
11.	"Fangs of Fury"	1:56
12.	"The High Ground"	1:37
13.	"Kenny's Rage"	1:52
14.	"Semifinal"	0:30
15.	"Cobra Kai is Gonna Die"	1:22
16.	"Countdown"	2:13
17.	"The Main Event"	1:40
18.	"SDO"	3:26
19.	"Give 'em All You Got"	0:40
20.	"Shirts Off"	1:59
21.	"Victory"	0:46
22.	"The Fellowship of the Dojos"	2:06
23.	"A Final Match for the Ages"	2:34
24.	"Bonsai Badass"	3:34
25.	"Illegal Strike"	1:25
26.	"Queen Cobra"	2:27
27.	"Defeat"	1:12
28.	"Streets of Reseda"	0:58
29.	"Screwed Everything Up"	1:14
30.	"The Fight I Have to Face"	2:13
31.	"Too Much at Stake"	1:01
32.	"The Moment of Truth" (Bill Conti, Dennis Lambert, Peter Beckett; performed by Carrie Underwood)	3:47
Total length:		57:42

===== Volume 2 =====
Cobra Kai: Season 4, Vol.2 (Soundtrack from the Netflix Original Series)
- Album cover

Soundtrack album by Leo Birenberg & Zach Robinson
- Released: January 7, 2022
- Genre: Soundtrack
- Length: 56:04
- Label: Madison Gate
- Producers: Leo Birenberg; Zach Robinson

Leo Birenberg & Zach Robinson chronology
Cobra Kai: Season 4, Vol.1 "All Valley Tournament 51" (Soundtrack from the Netflix Original Series) (2022)	Cobra Kai: Season 4, Vol.2 (Soundtrack from the Netflix Original Series) (2022)

All music is composed by Leo Birenberg & Zach Robinson.

No.	Title	Length
1.	"Like Old Times"	2:06
2.	"Divide and Conquer"	0:59
3.	"You're Not Getting What You Want"	0:45
4.	"Land a Hit"	2:11
5.	"Rip the Bandaid Off"	0:55
6.	"Okinawan Sparring Deck"	2:31
7.	"Basketball"	1:37
8.	"No be There"	0:56
9.	"Balboa Park After Dark"	1:45
10.	"Catch a Fish"	1:50
11.	"Sensei Silver"	2:03
12.	"Cobra Fly"	0:59
13.	"Our Way is the Right Way"	1:29
14.	"Ghost Boy"	1:45
15.	"Miyaguel"	1:16
16.	"Terry's Lesson"	2:05
17.	"Drive in, Stand Off"	1:44
18.	"Turn Fear into a Weapon"	1:39
19.	"Whose Side are You On?"	0:56
20.	"The Only Way Forward"	1:22
21.	"Not Here to Fight"	0:56
22.	"Let's Finish This"	1:37
23.	"A Storm of Senseis"	2:24
24.	"The Price of Mercy"	2:17
25.	"Committee Meeting"	1:24
26.	"Twisted Silver"	1:51
27.	"Weakness"	1:09
28.	"Level 1 Karate"	1:39
29.	"Always be My Sensei"	1:55
30.	"Remember the Cage"	2:07
31.	"Breaking and Entering"	1:33
32.	"Three-Headed Snake"	2:49
33.	"Prom Punch-out"	1:31
34.	"I Love You"	1:43
Total length:		56:04

== Marketing and release ==
The first teaser trailer was released on August 5, 2021, which featured promotional videos of the cast members and confirmed a December release date for the season, which was set for December 31. An extended trailer advertising the season was later released on December 9. Prior to the season's release, a virtual premiere screening was held on December 28. The screening, limited in number of attendees, featured a welcome from Heald, Hurwitz, and Schlossberg, a full screening of the first episode, and a question and answer session with the cast. The Q&A was released on the series' social media accounts following the screening and was hosted by Jacqueline Coley, an editor at Rotten Tomatoes. The season was released on DVD on September 13, 2022, a few days after the show's fifth season premiered on September 9.

== Reception ==
=== Critical response ===
Professional ratings
Aggregate scores
Source	Rating
Metacritic	70/100
Rotten Tomatoes	95%
Review scores
Source	Rating
The A.V. Club	B+
Chicago Sun-Times	3/4 stars
Empire Online	4/5 stars
IGN	7/10
IndieWire	B

On the review aggregator website Rotten Tomatoes, the season holds a score of 95% with an average rating of 7.9/10 based on 38 reviews. The website's critical consensus reads: "Cobra Kai still delights in a fourth season that mines great fun from shifting alliances, chiefly the uneasy truce between Johnny Lawrence and Daniel LaRusso". On Metacritic, the season has a weighted average score of 70 out of 100 indicating "generally favorable" reviews. Cristina Escobar with The A.V. Club wrote that the season "nicely continues the journeys of our favorite (and only) Valley karate fanatics, delivering fun along with impressively high kicks, moments of true emotion, and just enough stunted development to keep it all spinning" and praised newcomer Dallas Dupree Young, noting the similarities between his character and Macchio's original character from the films. The Chicago Sun-Times' Richard Roeper said the season was "quite ridiculous" but remained entertaining. James Dyer, a writer for Empire Online, noted that most plotlines throughout the season were expanded on from the third film in the franchise, but that it "introduces its own existential discord", The IGN writer Amelia Emberwing felt that it was obvious while watching the season that it was the first to be wholly produced by Netflix; Emberwing however, did state that it was "still one hell of a ride". Rebecca Theodore-Vachon of IndieWire opined that the series "faithfully honors its roots while managing to tell new and compelling stories".

=== Viewing figures ===
For the week of December 27, 2021, through January 2, 2022, the season topped the global Netflix most-watched television list. Within the three-day time period 120 million hours of the series was watched; it ranked in the top ten titles of 83 countries, and in 13 of which it was ranked number one. During this week, the series also topped the Nielsen ratings top streaming series list achieving 2.42 billion minutes. The following week beginning January 2, and running through January 9, the season remained in the number one spot on the list bringing in 107 million hours of viewing during the week.

=== Awards and nominations ===
At the 28th Screen Actors Guild Awards the season received a nomination for Outstanding Stunt Ensemble in a Television series. The award was lost to Squid Game.
