= Cobra Kai season 1 =

Cobra Kai
- Season 1
- Promotional poster
- Showrunners: Josh Heald; Jon Hurwitz; Hayden Schlossberg
- Starring: Ralph Macchio; William Zabka; Courtney Henggeler; Xolo Maridueña; Tanner Buchanan; Mary Mouser
- No. of episodes: 10

Release
- Original network: YouTube Red
- Original release: May 2, 2018

Season chronology
- Next → Season 2

The first season of Cobra Kai was released on YouTube Red on May 2, 2018 and consisted of 10 episodes. The series is a sequel to the original films of The Karate Kid franchise, focusing on the characters of Daniel LaRusso and Johnny Lawrence over 30 years after the original film.

The season follows Johnny Lawrence thirty-three years after his loss to Daniel LaRusso, as he reopens the Cobra Kai dojo and reignites his rivalry with Daniel. The season also follows the lives of Johnny's star student Miguel Diaz as well as his son Robby.

There were six starring roles throughout the season which also featured guest actors returning to the franchise portraying characters from the films. The season received universal acclaim for the performances (particularly those of Macchio, Zabka, and Maridueña), action sequences, and faithfulness to the original films.

== Cast and characters ==
=== Main ===
- Ralph Macchio as Daniel LaRusso
- William Zabka as Johnny Lawrence
- Courtney Henggeler as Amanda LaRusso
- Xolo Maridueña as Miguel Diaz
- Tanner Buchanan as Robby Keene
- Mary Mouser as Samantha LaRusso

=== Recurring ===
- Joe Seo as Kyler Park
- Annalisa Cochrane as Yasmine
- Bret Ernst as Louie LaRusso Jr.
- Bo Mitchell as Brucks
- Hannah Kepple as Moon Taylor
- Dan Ahdoot as Anoush Norouzi
- Susan Gallagher as "Homeless" Lynn
- Jacob Bertrand as Eli "Hawk" Moskowitz
- Gianni DeCenzo as Demetri Alexopoulos
- Griffin Santopietro as Anthony LaRusso
- Nichole Brown as Aisha Robinson
- Vanessa Rubio as Carmen Diaz
- Rose Bianco as Rosa Diaz
- Terayle Hill as Trey
- Jeff Kaplan as Cruz

=== Notable guests ===
- Ed Asner as Sid Weinberg
- Diora Baird as Shannon Keene
- David Shatraw as Tom Cole
- Ken Davitian as Armand Zarkarian
- Randee Heller as Lucille LaRusso
- Owen Morgan as Bert
- Martin Kove as John Kreese

== Episodes ==
Cobra Kai season 1 episodes
No. overall	No. in season	Title	Directed by	Written by	Original release date
1	1	"Ace Degenerate"	Jon Hurwitz & Hayden Schlossberg	Josh Heald & Jon Hurwitz & Hayden Schlossberg	May 2, 2018
Thirty-three years after losing to Daniel LaRusso in the 1984 All-Valley Tournament, (Note: As depicted in The Karate Kid (1984)) Johnny Lawrence is an alcoholic handyman fired from his job after arguing with a customer, while Daniel and his wife Amanda run a successful car dealership chain. Johnny saves his neighbor, Miguel Diaz, from a group of bullies but is arrested for assaulting them. Miguel implores Johnny to teach him karate, but Johnny initially refuses. Johnny’s stepfather, Sid Weinberg, gives him a check before officially disowning him. After Johnny's car is wrecked in a hit-and-run, the car is towed to one of Daniel's dealerships for repairs. Daniel personally covers the bill, but Johnny is bitter over having to take charity from his old rival. Realizing that Daniel’s daughter Sam was involved in the hit-and-run, he agrees to become Miguel's sensei and opens his own Cobra Kai dojo with the money from Sid.
2	2	"Strike First"	Jon Hurwitz & Hayden Schlossberg	Josh Heald & Jon Hurwitz & Hayden Schlossberg	May 2, 2018
Miguel begins his karate training with Johnny, who teases him for his asthma and low self-esteem as motivation. The health department informs Johnny that the dojo needs a lot of work before he can officially teach students. Daniel learns Sam is romantically interested in a boy named Kyler and offers to invite him to a family dinner. Miguel befriends social outcasts, Demetri Alexopoulos and Eli Moskowitz, at school and develops an immediate crush on Sam. The boys also discover that Kyler is one of the bullies who attacked Miguel. Johnny is informed that his son, Robby Keene, has been caught with drugs at school. Daniel notices Kyler's bruises during dinner and learns he received his injuries from Johnny. Daniel goes to the dojo to confront Johnny, who explains that Kyler and his friends attacked Miguel, leaving Daniel suspicious and concerned for Sam.
3	3	"Esqueleto"	Jennifer Celotta	Josh Heald & Jon Hurwitz & Hayden Schlossberg	May 2, 2018
Johnny fails to recruit more students to the dojo, and Daniel decides to chaperone for the school's Halloween dance, embarrassing Sam when he catches her and Kyler alone in a suggestive scene. Miguel's karate training progresses as Johnny encourages him to use the Cobra Kai creed of "Strike first. Strike hard. No mercy" in his everyday life and gives him a skeleton costume (the same one Johnny wore in 1984) for the dance, where Miguel overhears Kyler and his friends sexually objectifying Sam. Remembering his training, he attacks Kyler but is overpowered and severely beaten by the bullies. Johnny, who has been at the school handing out flyers for Cobra Kai, finds Miguel in the bathroom.
4	4	"Cobra Kai Never Dies"	Jennifer Celotta	Teleplay by : Jason Belleville; Story by : Josh Heald & Jon Hurwitz & Hayden Schlossberg	May 2, 2018
After stealing a laptop from a customer as part of his routine, Robby learns of the new Cobra Kai dojo and is embarrassed by his father's recruitment methods. Johnny gets drunk due to being depressed about Carmen forbidding him from training Miguel due to the aftermath of the Halloween fight with Kyler's gang and vandalizes a LaRusso Auto billboard, while Sam is horrified when she witnesses Kyler bullying Miguel, Demetri, and Eli. Kyler aggressively attempts to sexually harass Sam at a movie theater, but she fends him off and storms out of the movie theater, ending their relationship. Johnny confronts Robby after learning he has been skipping school. Robby rebuffs Johnny by adamantly refusing to go back to school and angrily pointing out that Johnny abandoned him for 16 years and that Johnny's own life is wasted. Johnny tracks down a resentful Shannon at a local bar, but she angrily rejects him, telling him that there are no do-overs in life. Vowing not to fail Miguel the way he failed his son and Shannon, Johnny pleads for Miguel's mom, Carmen, to let him continue Miguel's training, which she accepts. Daniel discovers that Johnny was the one who vandalized the LaRusso Auto billboard.
5	5	"Counterbalance"	Josh Heald	Josh Heald & Jon Hurwitz & Hayden Schlossberg	May 2, 2018
Miguel shows improvement in both his karate skills and his health. Daniel tries to make a shady deal that could shut down Cobra Kai but hurts innocent business owners in the process. Sam's classmate and former friend Aisha Robinson joins Cobra Kai, despite Johnny's initial misgivings about training girls. Sam discovers that Kyler has been spreading nasty rumors about her. When Kyler embarrasses Sam and makes her an outcast at school with Yasmine, Moon and Aisha refusing to let her talk to them or sit with them at lunch, Miguel stands up for her and successfully defeats Kyler and his friends, gaining Sam's respect. Robby decides to reconcile with his father but witnesses Johnny bonding with Miguel, feeling disowned and replaced. Amanda notices the changes in Daniel's behavior since the reopening of Cobra Kai, leading Daniel to visit Mr. Miyagi's grave to reflect and ask for wisdom. As Daniel prepares to drive away, he suddenly recalls Miyagi after he gifted Daniel his yellow 1948 Ford Super De Luxe convertible on his 18th birthday, reminding him that the lessons on maintaining balance didn't just apply to karate, but to one's entire life. Robby applies for a job at LaRusso Auto to get back at his father and Daniel returns to practicing karate to regain balance in his life. Note: This episode is dedicated in memory of Noriyuki "Pat" Morita.
6	6	"Quiver"	Josh Heald	Teleplay by : Joe Piarulli & Luan Thomas; Story by : Josh Heald & Jon Hurwitz & Hayden Schlossberg & Joe Piarulli & Luan Thomas	May 2, 2018
Daniel attempts to persuade Sam to take up karate again but is unsuccessful. The footage of Miguel's fight at school goes viral, bringing many new students to the Cobra Kai dojo. Still, Johnny cannot suppress his old ways and he especially embarrasses Eli in front of the entire class for his cleft lip. This causes Demetri to quit on his first day as he cannot accept Johnny's abrasive personality. Thanks to Miguel, Johnny is forced to remember his childhood as an outcast with an uncaring stepfather before he discovered Cobra Kai. Johnny admits that he has been tough and cruel to his remaining students but plans to continue his ways, telling them that life is unfair and they must overcome the challenges that life throws at them. Eli returns to the dojo with a distinctive mohawk haircut, for which Johnny nicknames him "Hawk". Robby gets a job at LaRusso Auto to get back at his father, as Sam and Miguel slowly develop a friendship at school. Robby decides to learn karate under Daniel's tutelage after Louie's antics inadvertently lead to him visiting Daniel's house.
7	7	"All Valley"	Steve Pink	Teleplay by : Stacey Harman; Story by : Josh Heald & Jon Hurwitz & Hayden Schlossberg & Stacey Harman	May 2, 2018
Johnny uses painful methods to train his new students. Getting advice from Johnny, Miguel asks Sam out on a successful date. Johnny tries to enter Cobra Kai in the All Valley Karate Tournament only to learn the dojo is permanently banned due to the transgressions and poor sportsmanship committed in the 1985 All-Valley Tournament by John Kreese, Terry Silver, and Mike Barnes. (Note: As depicted in The Karate Kid Part III (1989)) At an athletic committee meeting, Johnny tries to persuade them to reverse the ban but is opposed by Daniel, a committee member. As his closing argument, he tells the committee that his teachings differ from those of Kreese and Silver, claiming that he has learned from his past mistakes and that his dojo is now a place where people are taught self-confidence and how to stand up for themselves. Johnny's apparent sincerity convinces the committee and allows Cobra Kai to compete, much to Daniel's dismay. Despite initially agreeing to help his gang sneak inside the dealership at night, Robby turns against them and stops them using his karate skills and a security camera.
8	8	"Molting"	Steve Pink	Teleplay by : Michael Jonathan Smith; Story by : Josh Heald & Jon Hurwitz & Hayden Schlossberg & Michael Jonathan Smith	May 2, 2018
After being allowed to compete in the tournament, Johnny introduces additional training and unconventional methods. The LaRussos learn that Cobra Kai will compete, with only Sam being convinced Cobra Kai has changed (due to her romance with Miguel). Daniel's cousin Louie decides to take action against Johnny, who warns Miguel about Sam and the LaRusso family, telling him his version of how Daniel involved himself with Johnny's ex-girlfriend Ali Mills Schwarber in 1984 and how Daniel defeated Johnny in the All-Valley Tournament. Carmen invites Johnny to dinner, where he learns more about Miguel's family and is inspired to clean up his life, severing ties with Sid after paying off the money he borrowed and attempting to make amends with Robby. Daniel continues bonding with Robby, who hides his parentage and his initial intention for revenge against Johnny from Daniel and joins the LaRussos for dinner. At the LaRusso house, Miguel sees Sam and Robby bonding, leaving him heartbroken. Meanwhile, Louie and his thugs destroy Johnny's car by setting it on fire in retaliation for Johnny vandalizing the LaRusso Auto billboard, and Johnny furiously retaliates by beating them up and forcing Louie to reveal Daniel's address. Johnny then rides away on one of the bikers' motorcycles to confront Daniel.
9	9	"Different but Same"	Jon Hurwitz & Hayden Schlossberg	Teleplay by : Jason Belleville; Story by : Josh Heald & Jon Hurwitz & Hayden Schlossberg & Jason Belleville	May 2, 2018
Johnny arrives at the LaRusso house and has a brief confrontation with Daniel before Amanda defuses the situation by inviting Johnny over for breakfast. Daniel decides to fire Louie and compensate Johnny with a car in the dealership's trade-in lot. Unexpectedly, Daniel and Johnny bond during the test drive, enjoying the music of REO Speedwagon together, visiting Daniel's old apartment, and sharing about their lives before they met in 1984 and competed against each other in the final match of the All-Valley Tournament. Sam is grounded after Amanda learns she was involved in Johnny's hit-and-run, causing her to miss many calls from Miguel due to Amanda confiscating her phone as punishment for hiding the information about the hit-and-run accident. At the party, Aisha attacks Yasmine, one of the rich girls and her bully, by giving her a front wedgie in retaliation for her cyber-bullying. Robby breaks Sam out of her home for the party, but a drunk Miguel tries to pick a fight with Robby and accidentally hits Sam instead, convincing her that her father was right about Cobra Kai and causing her to break up with Miguel. Johnny drives Daniel home, where he finds Robby. Furious that his son has been secretly learning Miyagi-Do Karate from Daniel, Johnny attacks Daniel by shoving him against the wall and breaking one of his All-Valley trophies. At the same time, Daniel is simultaneously shocked and horrified to learn that Robby is Johnny's son after Robby defends Daniel. Feeling betrayed by Robby's dishonesty, Daniel furiously fires Robby and banishes him from his home.
10	10	"Mercy"	Jon Hurwitz & Hayden Schlossberg	Josh Heald & Jon Hurwitz & Hayden Schlossberg	May 2, 2018
Cobra Kai returns to the 50th Anniversary All Valley Under-18 Karate Championship led by Miguel. Robby also participates, unaffiliated with any dojo. Miguel and Hawk advance to the semifinals, while Aisha is depressed after Xander Stone eliminates her in the quarterfinals. However, she and Sam reconcile after apologizing to Aisha for her former association with Yasmine. Hawk is disqualified for dislocating Robby's left shoulder with a kick from behind. After arguing with Miguel, Sam leaves the tournament and returns to the family dojo, where she seemingly gets back to practicing karate. After Robby apologizes to Daniel for hiding the fact that he is Johnny's son, Daniel reconciles with Robby and assists Robby back into the ring, now as his sensei. Miguel exploits Robby's injured shoulder to win the final match, as Johnny realizes that his methods have corrupted Miguel. After the match, Daniel takes Robby to Mr. Miyagi's old home and reveals that he plans to use it as a dojo to continue Robby's training and teach others Miyagi-Do karate. At the Cobra Kai dojo, a drunk and miserable Johnny is confronted by Kreese, who praises him for resurrecting Cobra Kai.

== Reception ==
The first season had a positive response from critics. At the review aggregator website Rotten Tomatoes, it holds a 100% approval rating, with an average score of 7.54 out of 10 based on 48 reviews. The website's critical consensus reads: "Cobra Kai continues the Karate Kid franchise with a blend of pleasantly corny nostalgia and teen angst, elevated by a cast of well-written characters". Cobra Kai was 2018's best-reviewed TV drama on Rotten Tomatoes. Metacritic, which uses a weighted average, assigned the season a score of 72 out of 100 based on 18 critics, indicating "generally favorable" reviews.

The first episode, which was posted on YouTube for free along with episode two, had been viewed 5.4 million times within the first 24 hours. While it was noted that the response had been, in part, a result of YouTube releasing the episode for free, it was noted by Cinema Blend's Britt Lawrence that "YouTube Red's new series debuted to numbers that should make rival streaming services take notice".

== Production ==
=== Development ===
Cobra Kai was greenlit in August 2017, with ten half-hour episodes, written and executive produced by Josh Heald, Jon Hurwitz, and Hayden Schlossberg. Although the series received offers from Netflix, Amazon, Hulu, and AMC, it ultimately ended up on the subscription service YouTube Red, which is now YouTube Premium. The trio was joined by executive producers James Lassiter and Caleeb Pinkett of Overbrook Entertainment in association with Sony Pictures Television. YouTube Red released the first season on May 2, 2018.

=== Casting ===
Ralph Macchio and William Zabka revived their Karate Kid characters, Daniel LaRusso and Johnny Lawrence. Additional Karate Kid actors included Randee Heller, who reprised her role as Lucille LaRusso (Daniel's mother), and Martin Kove, who revived his role as John Kreese. The cast for the first season was announced in October 2017, and included Xolo Maridueña, Mary Mouser, Tanner Buchanan, and Courtney Henggeler. Ed Asner was cast in a guest role as Johnny's verbally abusive step-father, Sid Weinberg. Vanessa Rubio joined the cast as Miguel's mother in December.

=== Filming ===
Principal photography for the first season began in October 2017 in Atlanta, Georgia. Filming took place at various locations throughout that month at places including Union City, Marietta, and the Briarcliff Campus of Emory University. In November, shooting moved to locales such as the North Atlanta Soccer Association Tophat fields in East Cobb. In December, the production was working out of Marietta and Conyers. Various exterior shots were also filmed in parts of Los Angeles such as Tarzana and Encino. Exterior locations included Golf N' Stuff in Norwalk and the South Seas Apartments in Reseda, both of which were originally featured in The Karate Kid.

=== Premiere ===
The season held its world premiere on April 24, 2018, at the SVA Theatre in New York City, New York, during the annual Tribeca Film Festival. Following the screening, a discussion was held with writers, directors, and executive producers Hayden Schlossberg, Jon Hurwitz, and Josh Heald, in addition to series stars and co-executive producers William Zabka and Ralph Macchio.

On April 25, YouTube partnered with Fathom Events for special screenings of the first two episodes of the season at around 700 movie theaters across the United States. The event also included a screening of the original film.

=== Soundtrack ===
Cobra Kai (Score from the Original Series)

Soundtrack album by Leo Birenberg & Zach Robinson
- Released: May 4, 2018; January 8, 2018 (Australia)
- Genre: Soundtrack
- Length: 43:53
- Label: Madison Gate Records

Leo Birenberg & Zach Robinson chronology
Cobra Kai (Score from the Original Series) (2018)	Cobra Kai: Season 2 (Score from the Original Series) (2019)

Madison Gate Records released the official soundtrack on May 4, 2018. La-La Land Records released the physical version of the soundtrack with additional tracks in June. The soundtrack CD was released in Australia on January 8, 2019.

==== Track listing ====
All music is composed by Leo Birenberg and Zach Robinson.

No.	Title	Length
1.	"Awake the Snake"	2:06
2.	"Ace Degenerate"	1:25
3.	"Miyagi Memories"	1:34
4.	"Strike First"	1:06
5.	"Father and Son"	0:38
6.	"50th Anniversary"	1:00
7.	"The All-Valley Tournament"	3:34
8.	"A Badass Name for a Dojo"	0:37
9.	"Miyagi-Do"	1:52
10.	"Slither"	1:53
11.	"Cobra Guy"	0:49
12.	"Balance"	1:03
13.	"Speak Up, Lip"	0:57
14.	"Stone vs. Diaz"	1:40
15.	"Johnny's Story"	2:28
16.	"You Earned It"	0:51
17.	"Quiver"	1:08
18.	"Venomous"	1:15
19.	"Bonsai Lessons"	1:50
20.	"Ophidiophobia"	2:16
21.	"The Wrong Path"	1:58
22.	"Final Match"	1:48
23.	"The Cobra and the Mongoose"	1:19
24.	"Time Out"	1:35
25.	"No Mercy"	1:14
26.	"Miyagi's Tomb"	2:42
27.	"The New Champion"	1:37
28.	"King Cobra"	1:37
Total length:		43:53
