= Obliterated =

American action comedy-drama television series

- Genre: Action; Comedy-drama
- Created by: Jon Hurwitz; Hayden Schlossberg; Josh Heald
- Starring: Shelley Hennig; Nick Zano; Terrence Terrell; Paola Lázaro; C. Thomas Howell; Kimi Rutledge; Alyson Gorske; Eugene Kim
- Theme music composer: Leo Birenberg; Zach Robinson
- Country of origin: United States
- Original language: English
- No. of seasons: 1
- No. of episodes: 8

Production
- Executive producers: Jon Hurwitz; Hayden Schlossberg; Josh Heald; Dina Hillier
- Running time: 44–58 minutes
- Production companies: Counterbalance Entertainment; Sony Pictures Television Studios

Original release
- Network: Netflix
- Release: November 30, 2023

Obliterated is an American action comedy-drama television series created by Jon Hurwitz, Hayden Schlossberg, and Josh Heald. The series stars Nick Zano and Shelley Hennig. It was released on Netflix on November 30, 2023. In February 2024, the series was canceled after one season.

== Premise ==
An elite joint special-operations team is assembled from various branches of the U.S. Armed Forces and intelligence services to stop a deadly terrorist network from blowing up Las Vegas. They complete the mission and celebrate with a night on the town, filled with sex, drugs, and alcohol. They discover that the nuclear bomb they neutralized was fake, so the team must fight through their intoxications to find the real one to save the day.

== Cast ==
=== Main ===
- Shelley Hennig as Ava Winters, a CIA officer and team leader
- Nick Zano as Chad McKnight, a Navy SEAL Senior Chief Petty Officer
- Terrence Terrell as Trunk, a Navy SEAL Chief Petty Officer
- Paola Lázaro as Angela Gomez, a U.S. Marine Corps sniper and Staff Sergeant
- C. Thomas Howell as Hagerty, a U.S. Army Explosive Ordnance Disposal technician and Sergeant First Class
- Kimi Rutledge as Maya Lerner, an NSA computer expert
- Alyson Gorske as Lana Kirkwood/Anastasia Koslov, a civilian party girl who is revealed to be Ivan Koslov's sister
- Eugene Kim as Captain Paul Yung, a U.S. Air Force helicopter pilot

=== Recurring ===
- Costa Ronin as Ivan Koslov, an arms dealer
- Ivan G'Vera as Vlad Litvin
- Jade Bender as Sarah, an engaged woman celebrating her bachelorette party
- Carl Lumbly as James Langdon, the Director of the CIA
- Neal Kodinsky as Gleb
- Jason Mantzoukas as the voice of Zogg, the gremlin Paul hallucinates after taking shrooms
- David Costabile as Wade Maddox, a black-market operator
- Lindsey Kraft as Yani, a lounge singer

=== Guest ===
- Kellee Stewart as Sharonda
- Clive Standen as Liam
- Joel Michaely as Stefan
- Naomi Grossman as Janet
- Johann Fitch as Jeremy
- Tobias Jelinek as Ehren
- Connor Weil as Dane
- Lori Petty as Crazy Susan
- Keston John as Mr. Dugan
- Zach Zagoria as Blast
- Minnie Mills as Jen Yung
- Virginia Madsen as Marge McKnight
- Michael Landes as Ferguson
- De'voreaux White as Delray

== Episodes ==
No.	Title	Directed by	Written by	Original release date
1	"Real American Heroes"	Jon Hurwitz & Hayden Schlossberg	Josh Heald & Jon Hurwitz & Hayden Schlossberg	November 30, 2023
2	"Born in the U.S.S.R"	Josh Heald	Josh Heald & Jon Hurwitz & Hayden Schlossberg	November 30, 2023
3	"Craps"	Joel Novoa	Rachele Lynn	November 30, 2023
4	"Walks Of Shame"	America Young	Bob Dearden	November 30, 2023
5	"Shots! Shots! Shots!"	Sherwin Shilati	Teleplay by : Rowan Wheeler; Story by : Kate Sargeant	November 30, 2023
6	"From Vegas with Love"	Joel Novoa	Joe Piarulli & Luan Thomas	November 30, 2023
7	"Make It Rain"	Jon Hurwitz & Hayden Schlossberg	Rachele Lynn	November 30, 2023
8	"Last Call"	Josh Heald	Bob Dearden	November 30, 2023

== Production ==
Cobra Kai's Jon Hurwitz, Hayden Schlossberg, and Josh Heald created Obliterated under their overall deal at Sony Pictures Television with plans to write and executive produce the series as well. In October 2019, TBS gave a straight-to-series order of ten episodes; however, the show was later moved from TBS to Netflix and reduced to eight episodes. Hurwitz, Schlossberg, and Heald also directed, and Dina Hillier helped executive produce with the three. Nick Zano and Shelley Hennig were cast in the lead roles, and the main cast later added Terrence Terrell, Alyson Gorske, C. Thomas Howell, Eugene Kim, Paola Lázaro, and Kimi Rutledge. Additional recurring roles and guest stars were announced in October 2022.

Filming began in July 2022, taking place in Las Vegas and Albuquerque. On February 1, 2024, Netflix canceled the series after one season.

== Release ==
Eight episodes of Obliterated were released on Netflix on November 30, 2023. The date announcement also came with the arrival of first look images.

== Reception ==
The review aggregator website Rotten Tomatoes reported a 47% approval rating with an average rating of 4.1/10. The website's critics consensus reads, "Obliterated pulls out all the stops to be as memorable a binge as a bar crawl, but the hangover sets in quickly for this overly busy series." Metacritic, which uses a weighted average, assigned a score of 46% out of 100 based on nine critics, indicating "mixed or average reviews". Leila Latif of The Guardian gave the series one out of five stars and wrote, "The pace is so excruciating and the show so repetitive that by the third hour, nothing would seem more heroic than someone detonating the bomb and putting us all out of our misery".
