= Eunjangdo =

Korean traditional knife

Eunjangdo is a type of silver knife or norigae historically worn in Korea.

== History ==
In the Joseon dynasty period, both Korean men and women generally wore jangdo. During this period, jangdo developed in many aspects. The design, material, and techniques developed to produce eunjangdos in various way. The court also used geumjangdos and eunjangdos.

The eunjangdo was prohibited to be worn by the common people in the period of Yeonsangun reign (1498), but the prohibition had a limited effect. In the period of Hyunjong (1670), there was a law that would penalize common people for use of eunjangdos. The reason for this restriction was the importance of gold and silver. In a feudal society, gold and silver were indicators of social hierarchy.

== Use ==
Eunjangdo is a multi-purposed knife and at the same time has the characteristics of an accessory.

When women wore jangdo they had a breast-tie, called paedo and pocket called nangdo.

The material used to make eunjangdos is silver and the blade is steel. Some eunjangdos' sword blades were engraved with single-minded devotion, because eunjangdos were a symbol of fidelity.

Some eunjangdos contain chopsticks, so that when people eat out, they can use chopsticks that they know are safe from poisoning.

== In popular culture ==
The eunjangdo appears in the second episode of Cobra Kai season 6 "The Prize" as an ancient family knife John Kreese recovers for his master. It later appears in episode ten, "Eunjangdo".

== See also ==
- Yeolnyeo
