= Patrick Luwis =

American actor

- Born: December 19, 1994 (age 31); Washington, D.C., United States
- Occupation: Actor
- Years active: 2017–present
- Known for: Cobra Kai, Rebel Moon

Patrick Luwis (born December 19, 1994) is an American actor known for his roles as Axel Kovačević in the Netflix series Cobra Kai and as Ivar in Zack Snyder's Rebel Moon franchise. He has appeared in several prominent television series and films since beginning his acting career in 2017.

== Early life and education ==
Luwis was born in Washington, D.C., and developed an interest in acting during his studies at Hampden–Sydney College, where he performed in several stage productions. He graduated with a degree in theatre and rhetoric and furthered his education by studying at the University of Oxford and the University of Auckland.

== Career ==
Luwis has appeared in television series such as The Dropout, NCIS, and Danger Force.

In 2023, Luwis had a cameo in Barbie. Later that year, Luwis portrayed Ivar in Rebel Moon – Part One: A Child of Fire, directed by Zack Snyder. He would reprise the role in Rebel Moon – Part Two: The Scargiver, the following year in 2024.

His breakthrough role came in 2024 when he was cast in a major role as Axel Kovačević in the Netflix series Cobra Kai. Kovačević was introduced as the co-captain of the Iron Dragons team alongside Zara Malik (played by Rayna Vallandingham), led by their sensei Feng Xiao a.k.a. Wolf (portrayed by Lewis Tan) during the Sekai Taikai tournament as the tournament's defending champions and as an undefeated rival team.

== Filmography ==
=== Film ===
Year	Title	Role	Notes
2023	Barbie	Guy at the Beach	
2023	Rebel Moon – Part One: A Child of Fire	Ivar	
2024	Meeting You, Meeting Me	Gordon	
2024	Shark Girl	Kevin	
2024	Rebel Moon – Part Two: The Scargiver	Ivar	

=== Television ===
Year	Title	Role	Notes
2020	Danger Force	Rudd	Episode: "Power Problems Part 1"
2022	The Dropout	Gavin	Episode: "I'm in a Hurry"
2022	Animal Kingdom	Cesar	Episode: "Clink"
2023	NCIS	Mike	Episode: "Higher Education"
2024–2025	Cobra Kai	Axel	Recurring role, 8 episodes
2026	The Beauty	Meyer Williams (Post Beauty)	Episodes: "Beautiful Living Rooms" and "Beautiful Brothers"
