= Rayna Vallandingham =

American martial artist, actress, and social media influencer (born 2003)

- Vallandingham modeling for Sports Illustrated Swimsuit Issue in 2025
- Born: January 18, 2003 (age 23); Encinitas, California, U.S.
- Occupations: Martial artist; actress; social media influencer
- Years active: 2011–present

Rayna Vallandingham (born January 18, 2003) is an American martial artist, actress, and social media influencer. She is best known for her role as Zara Malik in the sixth season of the Netflix series Cobra Kai. Vallandingham appears in the Street Fighter reboot film as Juli.

== Early life and martial arts career ==
Vallandingham was born to a mother of Indian origin and a father of Dutch origin.

Vallandingham began practicing taekwondo at the age of 2, encouraged by her grandfather, who drove her to her classes. She took up the activity to address her shyness, relating in a 2025 Vogue India interview, "I trained all day, every day, even before I started kindergarten. Then, when I was a little older, I would go to school, head to the dojang during lunch break, go back to school, and return for martial arts training in the evening." Vallandingham won her first taekwondo world championship at age eight, at the American Taekwondo Association (ATA) World Championships held in Little Rock, Arkansas, in 2011. She had earned her first black belt two years earlier, at the age of six, and went on to win multiple world titles in traditional forms, weapons, sparring, and creative weapons categories, including the bo staff and nunchaku.

At age nine, she broke the world record for winning six world titles in a single year. She also achieved the "triple crown" of winning first place in all three taekwondo categories: traditional forms, traditional weapons and sparring. She took a break from martial arts when she began middle school, in order to live a more normal life, having won a total of 13 world championships. When she began to experience bullying, a teacher encouraged her to return to the sport. Vallandingham did so, but stated, "I felt like I’d lost my momentum. As a child prodigy, that was hard to stomach."

== Acting career ==
At the age of 10, she made her film debut in Underdog Kids as Leticia Hernandez, directed by six-time taekwondo black belt and actor Phillip Rhee. The film was released on July 7, 2015. Vallandingham appeared in the music videos for "Youth" (2018) by Shawn Mendes featuring Khalid, and "Baby Don't Hurt Me" (2023) by David Guetta featuring Anne-Marie and Coi Leray.

In 2024, Vallandingham made her television debut in Netflix's martial arts series Cobra Kai. She plays a supporting antagonist in the final season, portraying Zara Malik, a social media influencer and skilled martial artist who serves as co-captain of the Iron Dragons dojo, appearing alongside Lewis Tan as Sensei Wolf and Patrick Luwis as Axel Kovačević. The Iron Dragons were introduced during the Sekai Taikai tournament as the defending champions and an undefeated rival team. In Part 3 of Season 6, Vallandingham reprised her role as Zara Malik, with the character suffering her first defeat—against Tory Nichols, portrayed by Peyton List—in the Sekai Taikai girls' finals.

On October 16, 2026, Paramount Pictures released Kitao Sakurai's film adaptation of the Capcom video game Street Fighter, in which Vallandingham plays Juli, the skilled assassin and loyal servant of M. Bison.

== Public image ==
As an advocate for women in sports, Vallandingham seeks to challenge stereotypes in martial arts, a field traditionally dominated by men. She embraces phrases such as "kick like a girl" and "punch like a girl" as positive expressions of strength and skill. In interviews, Vallandingham has explained that her professional decisions are guided by these values and her vision of what it means to be a female martial artist.

== Filmography ==
=== Film ===
Year	Title	Role	Notes	Ref
2015	Underdog Kids	Leticia Hernandez	Film debut	
2021	Pawns	Jade	Short film	
2026	Street Fighter	Juli	Feature film	

=== Television ===
Year	Title	Role	Notes	Ref
2024–2025	Cobra Kai	Zara Malik	Recurring role (season 6)	
2026	Citadel	Aparna	Recurring role (season 2)	

=== Music videos ===
Year	Artist	Title	Role
2018	Shawn Mendes	"Youth"	Herself
2023	David Guetta Anne-Marie, Coi Leray	"Baby Don't Hurt Me"	Herself
2023	Lenny Tavárez	"Felicidades"	Herself
