= John Kreese =

Fictional character from The Karate Kid franchise

- The Karate Kid character
- Martin Kove as John Kreese in The Karate Kid Part III (left) and Cobra Kai (right).
- First appearance: The Karate Kid; 1984
- Last appearance: "Strike Last"; Cobra Kai; February 13, 2025
- Created by: Robert Mark Kamen
- Portrayed by: Martin Kove; Barrett Carnahan (young, Cobra Kai)
- Voiced by: Brent Mukai (Cobra Kai: The Karate Kid Saga Continues) Martin Kove (Cobra Kai 2: Dojos Rising)

In-universe information
- Titles: Captain; Sensei; Vietnam veteran
- Occupation: Karate instructor (sensei) (1975–1985; 2018–2020); U.S. Army Special Forces Officer (1965–1975) (retired); Busboy (1964-1965) (formerly); Birthday: October 2nd, 1946
- Affiliation: Cobra Kai Karate
- Fighting style: Tang Soo Do
- Family: Unnamed mother (deceased); Unnamed father (deceased)
- Significant others: Betsy (1965–1968, deceased)
- Nationality: American
- Teacher: Captain Turner; Master Kim Sun-Yung
- Students: Johnny Lawrence (1979–1984); Bobby Brown (1979–1984); Tommy (1979–1984); Jimmy (1979–1984); Dutch (1979–1984); Mike Barnes (1985); Tory Nichols (2018–2020); Eli Moskowitz (2018); Kyler Park (2018-2019); Robby Keene (2018-2019); Kwon Jae-Sung (2019–2020); Yoon Do-Jin (2019–2020); Chung-Hee (2019-2020); Min-Seok (2019-2020)

John Kreese is a fictional character and one of the main antagonists of The Karate Kid media franchise, portrayed by Martin Kove. He is introduced in The Karate Kid (1984) and returns in its sequels The Karate Kid Part II (1986), The Karate Kid Part III (1989) and the series Cobra Kai.

In the original trilogy, Kreese is established as a Vietnam veteran and a deranged karate sensei who founded the Cobra Kai dojo. In the original film, Kreese teaches his class to be aggressive and show no mercy to opponents, which leads to his star student and son-figure Johnny Lawrence to go into conflict with Daniel LaRusso, a peaceful teenager who recently moved to the San Fernando Valley. After Johnny loses to Daniel at the All-Valley Under-18 Karate Tournament, Kreese berates him for his loss and even attempts to strangle him, only stopped by Daniel's sensei Mr. Miyagi. In the third movie, Cobra Kai falls into ruin, and Kreese turns to his best friend Terry Silver to get revenge on Daniel and relaunch Cobra Kai, only for Daniel yet again to triumph.

29 years later, Kove reprised the role of Kreese in the sequel television series Cobra Kai (2018–2025). In the show, Kreese is revealed to have become homeless and unmotivated in the wake of Daniel's 2nd victory, and returns to the Valley after an older Johnny reopens the dojo and manages to win the All-Valley with his new students. Though Johnny initially forgives Kreese for his past transgressions, he exiles him from the dojo after seeing Kreese corrupt his students into becoming more aggressive, leading to Kreese regaining control of the dojo and firing Johnny in turn. With full control of the dojo, Kreese comes into conflict with Johnny and an older Daniel, who has opened his own karate dojo, and even recruits a more docile Terry Silver to help him, only for Terry to become angered with Kreese's growing sympathy for Johnny and Cobra Kai student Tory Nichols and frame him for assault. Kreese is ultimately able to escape from jail despite this and retakes control of Cobra Kai after Terry is defeated by Daniel, aiming to bring the dojo to the Sekai Taikai, the world's greatest Karate tournament. He eventually does so, undertaking a new protege, Kwon Jae-Sung. However, after a brawl in the tournament, Kwon's death pushes Kreese to reconcile with Johnny and Tory, resulting in reforming himself and handing control of the dojo back to Johnny. After overhearing Terry's plans to kidnap Johnny's wife and newborn child, Kreese fights him, resulting in both of their deaths due to Terry's yacht exploding.

The character has had a mostly positive reception from critics and is viewed as a quintessential 1980s villain. Kove received critical acclaim for his portrayal of the character, especially in part three of season 6 of Cobra Kai.

== Roles ==
He serves as the main antagonist of The Karate Kid (1984), the opening antagonist of The Karate Kid Part II (1986), the overarching antagonist of The Karate Kid Part III (1989), and one of the two main antagonists (alongside Terry Silver) of the sequel television series Cobra Kai. Specifically, he serves as the overarching antagonist in the season 1, the main antagonist of seasons 2 and 3, one of the two main antagonists (alongside Terry Silver) of season 4, a major antagonist in season 5 and one of the three main antagonists (alongside Terry Silver and Sensei Wolf) of season 6.

== Backstory ==
John Kreese in 1968 during the Vietnam War (as portrayed by Barrett Carnahan in Cobra Kai).

Kreese was born on October 2, 1946. When he was young, he was troubled, as his father left him and his mentally unstable mother committed suicide and he was picked on by other kids. Due to this, he was often left to fend for himself and eventually started working as a busboy at a diner in the San Fernando Valley. One day in 1965, David, a college football star, his girlfriend Betsy, and another friend of David's show up. After making eye contact with Betsy, Kreese gets chastised by her boyfriend and apologizes. Kreese receives a brochure to join the American Army. Later, when Kreese is taking out some trash, he witnesses David hitting his girlfriend. Kreese intervenes, causing a brawl to ensue between him, David, and the football player's friend. Betsy begins a romantic relationship with Kreese, who soon enlists in the US Army.

During the Vietnam War in 1968, Kreese is selected by Captain George Turner, to form a special forces team that conducts direct action missions in North Vietnam. It was then Kreese received training from Cpt. Turner on various martial art forms – including Tang Soo Do (a Korean martial art form). He is joined alongside by a young Terry Silver, nicknamed Twig, and an egotistical man nicknamed Ponytail. However, during a mission to blow up a North Vietnamese stronghold, Silver's radio crackles loudly, but out of compassion, Kreese refuses to detonate the explosives as they would kill Ponytail, the soldier who planted them. Consequently, every soldier in Kreese's squad gets captured by North Vietnamese soldiers, who execute Ponytail. Captain Turner rebukes Kreese for hesitating and continues to chastise him. The remaining American soldiers are held captive until 1969, when they are forced to participate in one-on-one death matches on top of a cobra and venomous snake pit arena for survival. At one point, Silver is chosen by the Vietnamese to fight Captain Turner. Knowing that Silver would almost certainly lose the fight, Kreese volunteers himself to fight Turner instead.

Before participating in the match, Turner tries to demoralize Kreese and thus score an easy victory by revealing that Betsy died in a car accident and hid the truth from him to maintain his focus, causing Kreese to become devastated. When the fight begins, Turner easily knocks Kreese to the floor of the bridge that is suspended over the snake pit. Turner verbally abuses Kreese for his inability to "shed his humanity" and is about to throw him into the pit, but the latter avoids his impending death by stabbing Turner in the leg with a broken piece of bamboo. Kreese kicks Turner off the bridge, but the latter manages to hold on to the edge. Before Kreese is about to strike a killing move to murder Turner, a U.S. airstrike neutralizes the spectating North Vietnamese soldiers, Turner orders Kreese to lift him up, but Kreese instead kicks him off the bridge, causing Turner to fall to his death in the cobra and venomous snake pit. Afterwards, Kreese, Silver, and the other captive soldiers are rescued by American forces, where Silver makes a promise to Kreese to always help him.

After escaping North Vietnamese captivity, Kreese went on to join the U.S. Army Special Forces and earned a field commission. He rose to the rank of captain, and served with the 5th Special Forces Group. While assigned to 5th Group, Kreese earned the title of Karate Champion of the U.S. Army, which he held from 1970 to 1972.

After his military career, Kreese returned to the Valley. He and Silver were met by some hippies who berated them for fighting in the war and called them killers. The two them decided that people needed to learn respected and formed the Cobra Kai dojo—named after the snake pit in which he killed Turner—in 1975 with Silver to train local kids in Tang Soo Do under the more marketable label of "Karate". However, Silver was forced to help run his family's business at the insistence of his father, who threatened to cut him out of the family inheritance. Though he left Cobra Kai to Kreese, Silver continued to provide financial support and promised to help run the dojo one day.

In 1980, Silver fully funded a trip to Korea for Kreese and himself to train directly under Master Kim Sun-Yung. On this trip, Silver revealed that he purchased Cobra Kai and proposes the dojo compete in a global tournament known as the Sekai Taikai. Kreese declined the proposal, hoping to focus on his students, in particular Johnny Lawrence, who would go on to become his top student. During this time, Kreese would become increasingly ruthless and sociopathic.

== Original films ==
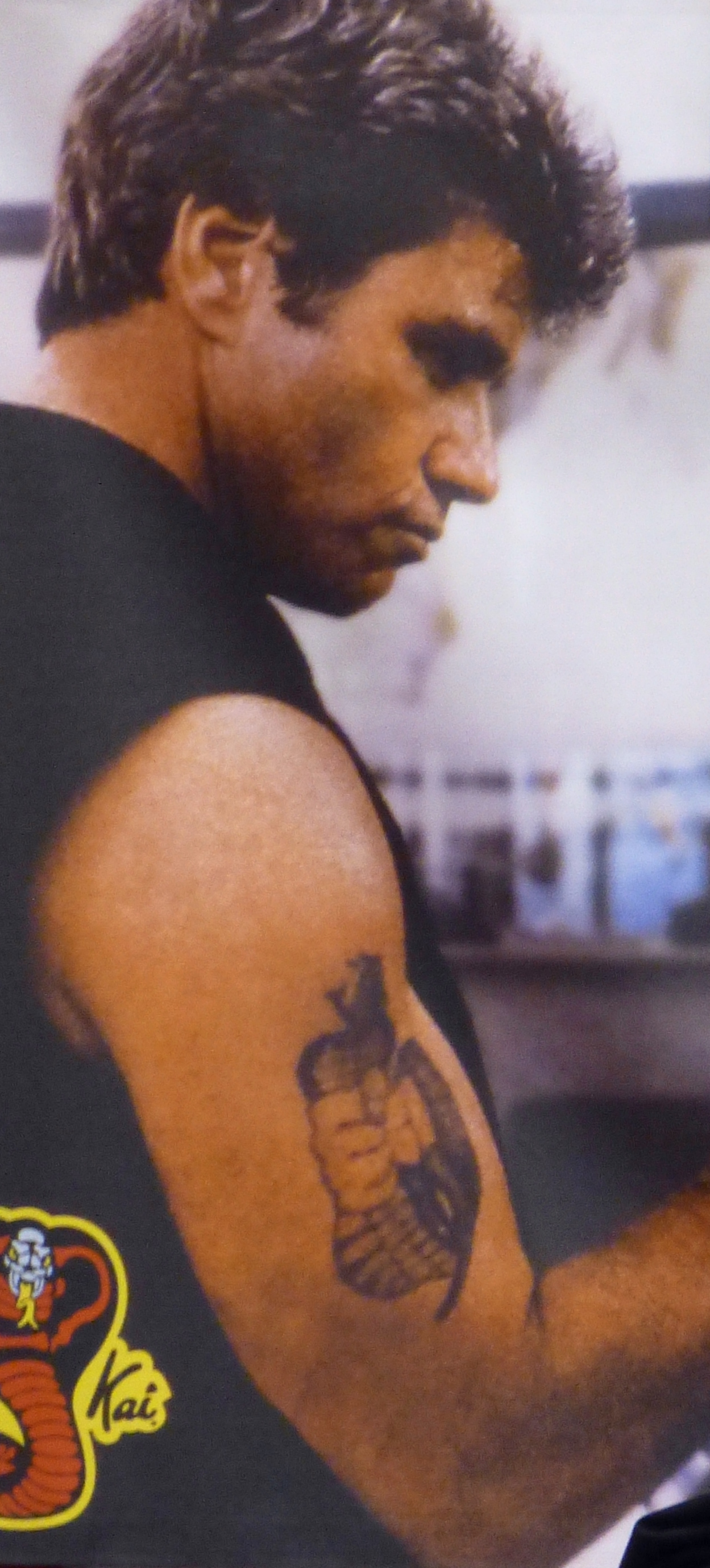
John Kreese in 1984 (as portrayed by Martin Kove in The Karate Kid).

=== The Karate Kid ===
In 1984, Johnny Lawrence has a conflict with Daniel LaRusso. In response, Mr. Miyagi teaches Daniel karate. When Daniel and Mr. Miyagi go to the Cobra Kai dojo, Mr. Miyagi proposes that Daniel should enter the All Valley Under-18 Karate Championships tournament, where he will face the Cobra Kai students and demands that the conflict will cease while Daniel trains. Kreese agrees to the idea, but threatens to allow his students to continue their harassment if neither show up at the tournament. At the tournament, Daniel reaches the semi-finals while Johnny advances to the finals after defeating a highly skilled opponent named Darryl Vidal. Kreese instructs Bobby Brown, one of his more compassionate students and the least vicious of Daniel's tormentors, to disable Daniel with an illegal attack on the knee. Bobby reluctantly does so, getting disqualified in the process. However, Daniel recovers, causing Kreese to instruct Johnny to sweep the leg. Despite this, Daniel ultimately defeats Johnny, becoming the new champion.

=== The Karate Kid Part II ===
After Daniel's victory in the tournament, Kreese berates Johnny for losing the tournament, and begins choking him out after Johnny calls him sadistic. Kreese is then approached by Mr. Miyagi, who humiliates Kreese in front of his students. Miyagi deftly dodges all of Kreese's attempted punches, but rather than deliver a devastating shot to Kreese's face, Miyagi simply "honks" the terrified sensei's nose and leaves him whimpering in fear. The Cobra Kai students eventually abandon him. During Daniel's final battle with Chozen, Daniel remembers how Mr. Miyagi defeated Kreese to save Johnny and honks Chozen's nose to defeat him and save Kumiko.

=== The Karate Kid Part III ===
Nine months after the tournament, Kreese has lost all of his students after attacking Johnny, leaving the future of Cobra Kai in doubt. Kreese visits Terry Silver, who has become a wealthy owner of a toxic waste disposal business, as well as a cocaine addict, and offers to help Kreese gain revenge on Daniel and Mr. Miyagi and re-establish Cobra Kai. Silver sends Kreese to Tahiti on vacation to recover while he hires Mike Barnes, the current under-18 national karate tournament champion, to harass Daniel and beat him in the next upcoming tournament. Silver tells Daniel that Kreese had died and offers to train him to defend himself against Barnes. However, unbeknownst to Daniel, this is part of Silver's scheme to physically and mentally break him while also forming a rift with Mr. Miyagi. A few months later, Kreese returns to the Valley and during a confrontation at the dojo, Kreese startles Daniel by jumping out of a hallway and screaming. Kreese and Silver laugh hysterically as Barnes attacks Daniel, but Mr. Miyagi beats up the trio and then escorts Daniel out of the dojo. During the tournament, Daniel defeats Barnes, prompting Silver to leave the arena. This implies that Cobra Kai is finished for good due to Barnes', Kreese's, and Silver's behavior getting the dojo banned from the tournament forever.

== Cobra Kai ==
=== Season 1 ===
Though he does not reappear until the season 1 finale, Kreese's actions in the original films are shown to have a profound effect on the main characters. Johnny harbors resentment towards Daniel for beating him in the 1984 tournament and remains traumatized over Kreese's assault on him after losing while Daniel disapproves of Johnny’s decision to resurrect Cobra Kai due to Kreese assaulting Johnny during the aftermath of the 1984 tournament. Johnny also has difficulty signing Cobra Kai up for the 2018 All-Valley tournament because Kreese, Silver, and Barnes's unsportsmanlike conduct during the 1985 tournament got the dojo banned from tournament participation. Johnny is able to successfully convince the committee to lift the ban and allow Cobra Kai to compete again by denying any affiliation with Silver or Barnes and claiming Kreese has died.

Johnny's reestablished Cobra Kai wins the 2018 All-Valley Karate Championship with Miguel Diaz's victory over Daniel's student and Johnny's estranged son Robby Keene, After Johnny returns to the dojo, Kreese makes an unexpected visit to congratulate him, and vows "the real story has only just begun".

=== Season 2 ===
Kreese asks Johnny for forgiveness for attacking him after the 1984 tournament, in which Johnny placed second. He claims that after Barnes's loss to Daniel in 1985, he re-enlisted in the Army to train Special Forces soldiers and run strikes during the Gulf War and the War in Afghanistan, though he now feels lost as the world has changed around him. Though Johnny rebuffs him for this apology, Kreese maintains that he never tried to kill Johnny and has repaired his second-place trophy to make amends which cools down the animosity between them; Johnny allows Kreese to attend Cobra Kai classes.

As Kreese regales the Cobra Kai students with stories of his military past, Miguel notices inconsistencies in his tales, and voices his concerns to Johnny. Johnny follows Kreese to a homeless shelter, where he admits that he flunked a psychological test when he attempted to re-enlist in the Army, and that his stories about wars after his Vietnam experience were lies. Taking pity on Kreese, Johnny decides to put his full trust in him, believing that he wants to change for the better. However, Kreese abuses his influence, even going so far as to encourage a vengeful Hawk to vandalize the Miyagi-Do dojo in retaliation for losing a fight to them. This costs Cobra Kai some of its students after Daniel confronts Johnny about the matter in the middle of a class. After seeing the abusive tactics used by his students during a training exercise at Coyote Creek when Miguel delivers an aggressive beating on Hawk over his vandalism of Miyagi-Do, Johnny expels Kreese from the dojo.

Unbeknownst to Johnny, Kreese had convinced strip-mall landlord Armand Zarkarian to sign the dojo over to him while Johnny was visiting his dying friend Tommy, and he keeps in touch with the students who are loyal to him behind Johnny's back. After Miguel is severely injured during his fight with Robby when the former shows mercy to the latter at the end of the school brawl, most of the disillusioned Cobra Kai students lose faith in Johnny as seen when Hawk openly blames Johnny for Miguel's injuries accidentally caused by Robby while Kreese makes his move and takes complete ownership of the dojo. Now as its sole sensei, Kreese schemes to return Cobra Kai to the merciless organization it once was, using the remnants of Johnny's most disaffected and disillusioned students as his core.

=== Season 3 ===
Kreese suffers the least fallout in the aftermath of the high school brawl, only losing a couple students, including Miguel's girlfriend Tory Nichols, after being placed on probation for instigating the fight, and Aisha whose parents withdraw her from the dojo. Needing to bolster his ranks, Kreese convinces Tory to return to the dojo by offering free tuition and intimidating her seedy and unscrupulous landlord. His management of Cobra Kai sows seeds of division within his students' ranks, most notably with Hawk, who disapproves of Kreese's recruitment of his former bullies Kyler and Brucks, and later Robby after he leaves juvenile detention. Kreese proceeds to expel students who object to feeding a live hamster to a snake. Most of the expelled students get recruited by Miguel into Johnny's new dojo Eagle Fang Karate. Hawk's loyalty to Cobra Kai is put to question as he is cast aside, while Kreese views Tory and Robby as his star pupils.

Kreese's machinations land him squarely in the sights of the LaRussos and Johnny. When Demetri's right arm is broken by Hawk in a fight with the Miyagi-Do and Cobra Kai students at the laser tag arena, a furious Amanda storms into the dojo and slaps Kreese, who retaliates by issuing a restraining order against her. Amanda and Daniel convince Armand to evict Kreese despite consistently paying his rent on time, but Kreese beats up Armand and his nephews when they confront him. As revenge, Kreese plants a live cobra in a car on the showroom floor of the LaRusso dealership. During a town hall meeting to discuss whether or not to let the All Valley Tournament continue, Kreese manages to ingratiate himself to the council members by claiming to promote strength and discipline through karate, all while painting Miyagi-Do as the aggressors, a position that is backed up by the vocal protests of Amanda, Daniel and Johnny. Due to the outburst, the council are inclined to cancel the tournament, though reconsider after Miguel gives the assembled audience an impromptu speech advocating for the tournament, with the help of Daniel's daughter Sam.

Noticing the visible connection between Miguel and Sam, Kreese realizes they are likely to create an alliance between their dojos and decides to take action, and he exploits Tory's vendetta against Sam to get her to lead the Cobra Kais in a fight against the Miyagi-Do and Eagle Fang students at the LaRusso home. The attack fails, as Hawk defects to the Miyagi-Do and Eagle Fang students midway through the fight, and all of the Cobra Kai fighters are defeated. When Johnny finds out what happened, he storms into Cobra Kai to confront Kreese, and is horrified when he finds Kreese training Robby. Johnny viciously beats Kreese and at one point grabs a Sai but is interrupted when Robby intervenes. Refusing to fight, Johnny accidentally knocks Robby out by pushing him into a locker while evading his attacks and trying to reason with him to no avail. While Johnny is concerned with his son's well-being, Kreese uses it as an opportunity to strangle him.

Before Kreese can finish Johnny off, Daniel arrives. Even with Kreese using glass shards as an improvised weapon, Daniel immobilizes Kreese using the pressure point techniques that Chozen taught him in Okinawa. Sam and Miguel arrive just as Daniel is about to deliver the finishing blow with Johnny's approval, convincing them to spare Kreese. Kreese agrees to cease hostilities with Daniel and Johnny and settle their differences at the upcoming All Valley Tournament, with a vow to shut down Cobra Kai if he loses. He retreats into the battered dojo with Robby, and calls up Terry Silver to enlist his help.

=== Season 4 ===
Following the attack on the LaRusso residence, several Cobra Kai students quit, leading to Kreese taking in new recruits in anticipation of the tournament. Meanwhile, Silver initially refuses to help Kreese, as he is now living a new life and voices regret for his actions against Daniel in 1985. Silver eventually changes his mind and agrees to rejoin Cobra Kai, but tells Kreese they must focus on the tournament and not repeat their prior mistakes. Despite their renewed alliance, Kreese starts suspecting Silver is undermining him with conflicting priorities and lessons, and is particularly angered when Silver implies to their students during a lesson that Kreese has a weakness. Kreese reprimands Silver, warning him not to challenge his authority. Silver tries to prove his loyalty by renewing his pledge to expand Cobra Kai across the Valley, including buying the original Cobra Kai dojo. However, Kreese is taken aback when he discovers Silver has lured Johnny into an ambush to demoralize his students, particularly Miguel. As Silver attempts to finish Johnny off, Kreese steps in and stops the fight, reminding Silver of their agreement that there would be no hostilities until the tournament, to Silver’s dismay.

At the tournament, Kreese apologizes to Johnny for Silver's actions, but Johnny rebuffs him and vows to defeat Cobra Kai once and for all. During the final match between Tory and Sam, Silver encourages Tory to fight dirty to win, but Kreese remembers strangling Johnny after he lost to Daniel and encourages Tory to fight her own way instead, much to Silver's surprise. Tory wins her match against Sam, and Cobra Kai wins the tournament with the most points overall. However, unbeknownst to Kreese, Silver secretly bribed the referee to rig the match in Cobra Kai's favor.

Celebrating at Silver's beach house, Silver thanks Kreese for pulling him out of retirement but accuses him of caring more about Johnny than restoring their old partnership. Silver tells Kreese that Johnny is his weakness before declaring Kreese as his own weakness. Kreese reminds Silver he saved his life in Vietnam, but Silver says he is no longer in debt to him and ends their friendship by having him framed for Silver's assault against Stingray. Kreese is arrested by the police for aggravated assault and attempted murder in relation to Silver's attack on former adult Cobra Kai student Stingray when he asked to rejoin Cobra Kai after Kreese rejected him; Silver told him he could rejoin Cobra Kai if he falsely blamed Kreese for the attack. As he is apprehended and taken away, Kreese furiously swears revenge on Silver, who now has full control of Cobra Kai.

=== Season 5 ===
A jury finds Kreese guilty of Stingray's beating and is sent to prison. In prison, Kreese is bullied by a bigger inmate, initially refusing to fight back so that he can get a parole hearing. However, after learning from his therapist that he has been denied, he fights back at the gang to intimidate them. Kreese is frequently visited by Tory, and they work together to try and undermine Silver's hold on Cobra Kai. Later, Daniel and Johnny visit Kreese to find out what Silver is planning to do with Cobra Kai. When he reveals nothing, the duo trick him into revealing that Silver was hoping to enroll Cobra Kai in a global tournament known as the Sekai Taikai decades before and is likely to do so now. When Tory later visits again for advice on the Sekai Taikai tournament, he simply tells her to do what she can to win, revealing he is bailing on his revenge plan. However, at this point, Tory mistakes this for abandoning her and severs ties with Kreese.

At the end of the season, Kreese fakes his death with the help of a fellow inmate by using melted Jell-O as a substitute for blood. This allows him to escape from prison with vengeance on his mind. Unknown to Kreese, however, Silver had already been arrested with multiple charges both for bribing the All-Valley tournaments and Stingray confessing to the police about the truth behind the assault.

=== Season 6 ===
Following his escape from prison, Kreese retreats to South Korea and reunites with Kim Da-Eun. He convinces her grandfather to let several of his students compete in the Sekai Tekai by retrieving an eunjangdo from a cave with a cobra. During their training he sees potential in one student, Kwon, whom he convinces to prove himself as the stronger fighter by channeling his anger into something useful. Once the team, with Tory in tow due to her grief in the aftermath of her mother’s death, arrives in Barcelona for the tournament, Kreese begins his old taunting tactics to undermine Johnny and Daniel. Like them, however, Kreese is shocked and furious to discover that Terry Silver is not only out of prison but is sponsoring another team, the Iron Dragons. He is soon provoked into going after Silver when the eunjangdo is stolen by Johnny and Chozen. After Cobra Kai loses their spot in the tournament, Kreese plots to kill Silver. However, when another team is disqualified, Cobra Kai gains another chance as they were the next team with the most points. During the semi-finals, the disqualified team start a brawl in retaliation for their disqualification and chaos ensues. Kreese uses the opportunity to go after Silver only to lose the eunjangdo in the chaos. Fighting Silver one-on-one, Kreese is nearly beaten by him until Johnny intervenes. The three men hear Kwon scream in pain and find to their horror he has accidentally stabbed himself to death with the eunjangdo.

A remorseful Kreese returns to South Korea for Kwon's funeral and admits he needs to make amends for his path. Kim Da-Eun is instructed by Kim Sun-Yung to kill Kreese if she wishes to take over the dojo after his death. However, she chooses instead to kill Sun-Yung after Kreese compliments her teaching style. Kreese returns to the Valley and reconciles with Tory. He tracks Johnny down at the All-Valley Arena and apologizes for attacking him at the 1984 All-Valley tournament and subsequently abandoning him. To make amends with Johnny, Kreese hands over the reins of the Cobra Kai dojo to him and the two forgive each other. When he discovers that Silver is planning to abduct Carmen and Johnny's recently newborn daughter to sabotage Johnny right before the final fight with Sensei Wolf, he tracks Silver down on his yacht where he kills Silver’s henchman, Dennis, and the two fight with Kreese on the losing end. Kreese throws his lit cigar into a puddle of oil by a series of gas canisters causing the yacht to blow up, killing himself and Silver and rendering all of Silver’s plans in complete vain. Kreese and Silver’s deaths are indirectly mentioned in the series finale when Sensei Wolf wonders out loud about Silver’s whereabouts due to the Iron Dragons being unaware of Silver's fate on the day of the final fight.

== Commentary ==
The character was based on Robert Mark Kamen's friend Ed McGrath. Martin Kove got the role by being verbally abusive towards director John G. Avildsen. An often recited rumor is that the character of John Kreese was originally written for Chuck Norris, but he turned down the role because he thought it would give karate a negative image. Norris has disputed this rumor, but said that if he had been offered the role, he would have turned it down for similar reasons.

Kove appeared as Kreese in at least three instances outside the main The Karate Kid franchise. In 2011, Kove played Kreese on the Tosh.0 episode "Board Breaker". He also appeared in an episode of The Goldbergs entitled "The Kara-te Kid" playing a character named Master John, named after Kreese. While he never actually states his name as Kreese, he also appears in Intuit QuickBooks commercials spoofing the character, stating that when he started Cobra Kai he had a lack of control over his business that made him intense which improved after he started using the program. He is seen promoting "more mercy", and telling students to 'support the leg'.

== Honors ==
In 2025, Screen Rant included Kreese on their list of the 10 Greatest Martial Arts Movie Villains Of All Time. Today.com also ranked Kreese at number one among all villain characters in both The Karate Kid and Cobra Kai Series. In 2022, the character was inducted into the Fictitious Athlete Hall of Fame via the contributors wing.
