= Susan Gallagher =

American actress

- Born: US
- Occupation: Actress
- Years active: 1993–present
- Known for: Cobra Kai

Susan Gallagher is an American actress best known for her recurring role as Homeless Lynn on the Netflix series Cobra Kai.

== Career ==
Gallagher had her first acting role in the 1990s in the television series Safe Harbor. She was personally selected by producer Aaron Spelling. She received a positive review for her minor role as the Lamentian Homesteader in the series Loki.

She founded Her Little Red Productions in 2014, aiming to support female directors and actors in film. In the Netflix series Cobra Kai, Gallagher plays Homeless Lynn. The sassy homeless character lives outside the mall where Johnny Lawrence's dojo is located. In the 2022 web series Queering, Gallagher plays a mother who decides she is bisexual.

== Personal life ==
Gallagher's family has lived in Gaston County, North Carolina for generations and she was born in Gastonia, North Carolina. She married her husband, Jimbo Jahna in 1987 and they have two children, Caroline Lea and Bo Jahna. They live in Florida and North Carolina. Susan has a condo in Atlanta.

She has a black belt in taekwondo.
