= Cobra Kai =

American martial arts comedy drama television series (2018–2025)

- The outro scene featuring the Cobra Kai dojo logo
- Genre: Comedy drama; Action; Martial arts
- Created by: Josh Heald; Jon Hurwitz; Hayden Schlossberg
- Based on: The Karate Kid by Robert Mark Kamen
- Showrunners: Josh Heald; Jon Hurwitz; Hayden Schlossberg
- Starring: Ralph Macchio; William Zabka; Courtney Henggeler; Xolo Maridueña; Tanner Buchanan; Mary Mouser; Jacob Bertrand; Gianni DeCenzo; Martin Kove; Peyton List; Vanessa Rubio; Thomas Ian Griffith; Dallas Dupree Young
- Composers: Leo Birenberg; Zach Robinson
- Country of origin: United States
- Original language: English
- No. of seasons: 6
- No. of episodes: 65 (list of episodes)

Production
- Executive producers: William Zabka; Ralph Macchio; Will Smith; James Lassiter; Caleeb Pinkett; Susan Ekins; Josh Heald; Jon Hurwitz; Hayden Schlossberg; Michael Jonathan Smith; Bob Dearden; Joe Piarulli; Luan Thomas
- Producers: Katrin L. Goodson; Bob Wilson
- Production locations: Atlanta, Georgia; Los Angeles, California
- Cinematography: Cameron Duncan
- Editors: Nicholas Monsour; Jeff Seibenick; Ivan Victor
- Camera setup: Single-camera
- Running time: 24–37 minutes (YouTube); 28–49 minutes (Netflix)
- Production companies: Hurwitz & Schlossberg Productions; Overbrook Entertainment; Heald Productions; Counterbalance Entertainment; Westbrook Studios; Sony Pictures Television (Note: Credited as Sony Pictures Television Studios for seasons 3–5. Current Netflix prints for seasons 1–2 use the 2020 Sony Pictures Television Studios logo.)

Original release
- Network: YouTube Red
- Release: May 2, 2018
- Network: YouTube Premium
- Release: April 24, 2019
- Network: Netflix
- Release: January 1, 2021 – February 13, 2025

Cobra Kai is an American martial arts comedy drama television series created by Josh Heald, Jon Hurwitz, and Hayden Schlossberg, and distributed by Sony Pictures Television. It serves as a sequel to the first three The Karate Kid films created by Robert Mark Kamen. Cobra Kai premiered on May 2, 2018, and concluded on February 13, 2025, after six seasons consisting of 65 episodes. Originally released on YouTube Red / YouTube Premium for its first two seasons, the series later moved to Netflix.

Ralph Macchio and William Zabka, reprising their respective roles as Daniel LaRusso and Johnny Lawrence from the film series, star in Cobra Kai alongside Courtney Henggeler, Xolo Maridueña, Tanner Buchanan, Mary Mouser, Jacob Bertrand, Gianni DeCenzo, Peyton List, Vanessa Rubio, and Dallas Dupree Young. Martin Kove and Thomas Ian Griffith also reprise their roles as the antagonists John Kreese and Terry Silver from the original film series. Cobra Kai re-examines The Karate Kid films as Johnny's "redemption story" that questions his role as a villain, and also introduces the struggles that both Daniel and Johnny face with their respective father figures and their children.

Cobra Kai attained high viewership on both YouTube and Netflix, and received critical acclaim for its writing, performances, action sequences, humor, character development, and faithfulness to the films. It received numerous awards and nominations, with the third season being nominated for Outstanding Comedy Series at the 73rd Primetime Emmy Awards.

== Premise ==
Beginning in 2017, thirty-three years after being defeated by Daniel LaRusso in the 1984 All-Valley Karate Tournament at the end of The Karate Kid (1984), Johnny Lawrence suffers from alcoholism and depression. He is impoverished and living in an apartment in Reseda, Los Angeles, having fallen far from his wealthy lifestyle in Encino. He also has a son named Robby, but the two are estranged due to Lawrence's neglect as a parent. In contrast, Daniel is now the wealthy owner of a car dealership chain – "Larusso Auto Group" – and is married to co-owner Amanda with whom he has two children: Sam and Anthony. However, Daniel often struggles to meaningfully connect with his children especially after his friend and mentor Mr. Miyagi died prior to the series' beginning.

After using karate to defend his teenage neighbor Miguel Diaz from a group of high school bullies, Johnny re-opens Cobra Kai to train the young man in self-defense. The revived dojo attracts a group of bullied social outcasts who find camaraderie and self-confidence under Johnny's tutelage. The reopening of Cobra Kai rekindles Johnny's old rivalry with Daniel, who subsequently responds by opening the Miyagi-do dojo with Sam and Robby, leading to a rivalry between the respective dojos.

== Cast and characters ==
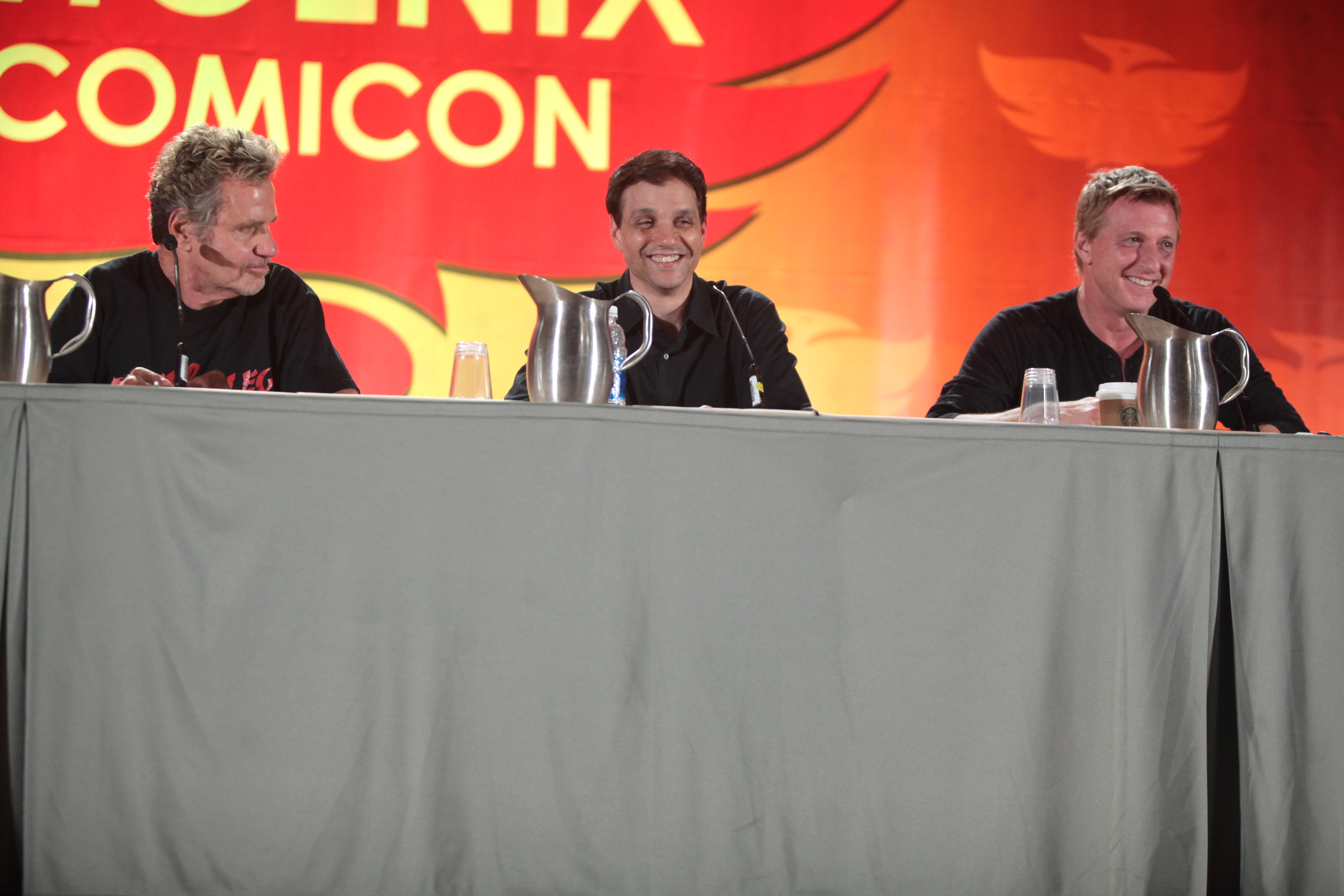
Martin Kove, Ralph Macchio & William Zabka (2016)

=== Main ===
Actor	Character	Seasons							
Actor	Character	1	2	3	4	5	6		
Actor	Character	1	2	3	4	5	Part 1	Part 2	Part 3
Ralph Macchio	Daniel LaRusso	Main	Main	Main	Main	Main	Main	Main	Main
William Zabka	Johnny Lawrence	Main	Main	Main	Main	Main	Main	Main	Main
Courtney Henggeler	Amanda LaRusso	Main	Main	Main	Main	Main	Main	Main	Main
Xolo Maridueña	Miguel Diaz	Main	Main	Main	Main	Main	Main	Main	Main
Tanner Buchanan	Robby Keene	Main	Main	Main	Main	Main	Main	Main	Main
Mary Mouser	Samantha LaRusso	Main	Main	Main	Main	Main	Main	Main	Main
Jacob Bertrand	Eli "Hawk" Moskowitz	Recurring	Main	Main	Main	Main	Main	Main	Main
Gianni DeCenzo	Demetri Alexopoulos	Recurring	Main	Main	Main	Recurring (Note: Credited as a "Special Guest Star".)	Main	Main	Main
Martin Kove	John Kreese	Guest	Main	Main	Main	Main	Main	Main	Main
Peyton List	Tory Nichols		Recurring (Note: Despite being credited as a recurring guest star, List was frequently listed alongside other starring cast members in promotional material for the third season.)	Recurring	Main	Main	Main	Main	Main
Vanessa Rubio	Carmen Diaz	Recurring	Recurring	Recurring	Main	Main	Main	Main	Main
Thomas Ian Griffith	Terry Silver				Main	Main		Main	Main
Dallas Dupree Young	Kenny Payne				Recurring	Main	Main	Main	Main

=== Recurring ===
- Joe Seo as Kyler Park (seasons 1, 3–5; guest season 6)
- Annalisa Cochrane as Yasmine (seasons 1, 3; guest seasons 4–6)
- Bret Ernst as Louie LaRusso Jr. (seasons 1, 3; guest seasons 4–6)
- Bo Mitchell as Brucks (season 1; guest seasons 3, 6)
- Hannah Kepple as Moon Taylor (seasons 1–4; guest seasons 5–6)
- Dan Ahdoot as Anoush Norouzi (seasons 1–2; guest seasons 3–6)
- Susan Gallagher as "Homeless" Lynn (season 1; guest seasons 2–4)
- Griffin Santopietro as Anthony LaRusso (seasons 1, 4–6; guest seasons 2–3)
- Nichole Brown as Aisha Robinson (seasons 1–2; guest season 4)
- Rose Bianco as Rosa Diaz (seasons 1, 4, 6; guest seasons 2–3, 5)
- Terayle Hill as Trey (season 1; guest seasons 2–3)
- Jeff Kaplan as Cruz (season 1; guest seasons 2–3)
- Owen Morgan as Bert (seasons 2–6; guest season 1)
- Paul Walter Hauser as Raymond "Stingray" Porter (seasons 2, 5; guest seasons 4, 6) (Note: Credited as a "Special Guest Star" for the episode "Ex-Degenerate".)
- Aedin Mincks as Mitch (seasons 2–6)
- Khalil Everage as Chris (seasons 2–6)
- Nathaniel Oh as Nathaniel (seasons 2–6)
- Okea Eme-Akwari as Shawn Payne (season 3; guest seasons 4, 6)
- Selah Austria as Piper Elswith (season 4; guest season 2)
- Milena Rivero as Lia Cabrera (season 4)
- Brock Duncan as Zack Thompson (season 4)
- Oona O'Brien as Devon Lee (seasons 4–6)
- Yuji Okumoto as Chozen Toguchi (seasons 5–6; guest seasons 3–4)
- Alicia Hannah-Kim as Kim Da-Eun (seasons 5–6)
- Owen Harn as Gabriel (season 5)
- Carsten Norgaard as Gunther Braun (season 6; guest season 5)
- Brandon H. Lee as Kwon Jae-Sung (season 6)
- Daniel Kim as Yoon Do-Jin (season 6)
- Lewis Tan as Feng Xiao / Sensei Wolf (season 6)
- Patrick Luwis as Axel Kovačević (season 6)
- Rayna Vallandingham as Zara Malik (season 6)
- William Christopher Ford as Dennis de Guzman (season 6)

=== Guest ===
- Ed Asner as Sid Weinberg (seasons 1, 3)
- Vas Sanchez as Nestor (seasons 1–2, 4, 6)
- Dawson Towery as Rory (season 1)
- Jonathan Mercedes as A.J. (season 1)
- Erin Bradley Dangar as Counselor Blatt (seasons 1, 3, 6)
- Diora Baird as Shannon Keene (seasons 1–6)
- David Shatraw as Tom Cole (seasons 1, 3)
- Ken Davitian as Armand Zarkarian (seasons 1–3)
- Matt Borlenghi as Lyle (seasons 1–3, 5–6)
- Candace Moon as Laura Lawrence (seasons 1, 4)
- Keith Arthur Bolden as Daryl (seasons 1, 3–4, 6)
- Cara AnnMarie as Sue (seasons 1, 4, 6)
- Kurt Yue as George (seasons 1, 4, 6)
- Randee Heller as Lucille LaRusso (seasons 1–2, 4, 6)
- Talin Chat as Xander Stone (season 1)
- Kim Fields as Sandra Robinson (season 2)
- Ron Thomas as Bobby Brown (seasons 2–3, 6)
- Rob Garrison as Tommy (season 2)
- Tony O'Dell as Jimmy (season 2)
- Alex Collins as Graham (season 2)
- John Cihangir as Doug Rickenberger (seasons 2–3)
- Barrett Carnahan as young John Kreese (seasons 3–6)
- Jesse Kove as David (season 3)
- Emily Marie Palmer as Betsy (seasons 3, 5)
- Tamlyn Tomita as Kumiko (season 3)
- Traci Toguchi as Yuna (season 3)
- Dee Snider as himself (season 3)
- Terry Serpico as Captain George Turner (seasons 3, 5)
- Nick Marini as young Terry Silver (seasons 3–6)
- Seth Kemp as "Ponytail" (season 3)
- Elisabeth Shue as Ali Mills (season 3)
- Deborah May as Mrs. Mills (season 3)
- Salome Azizi as Cheyenne Hamidi (season 4)
- Kevin Allison as Emile (season 4)
- Julia Macchio as Vanessa LaRusso (seasons 4–6)
- P. J. Byrne as Greg Hughes (season 4)
- Carrie Underwood as herself (season 4)
- Luis Roberto Guzmán as Hector Salazar (season 5)
- Josh Lawson as Owen (season 5)
- Eryk Anders as Vicente "The Wolf" Gonzales (season 5)
- Sean Kanan as Mike Barnes (seasons 5–6)
- Robyn Lively as Jessica Andrews (season 5)
- Sunny Mabrey as Elizabeth-Anne Rooney / Lizzie-Anne (season 5)
- Tracey Bonner as Dr. Emily Folsom (season 5)
- Jake Huang as Sensei Hyan-Woo (season 5) (Note: Huang also portrayed an unnamed Cobra Kai student in the fourth season)
- Tyron Woodley as Sensei Odell / K.O. (season 5)
- Dante Ha as Sensei Min-Jun (season 5)
- Stephen Thompson as Sensei Morozov (season 5)
- Craig Henningsen as Sensei Bacaria (season 5)
- Steve Brown as Sensei Suk-Chin (season 5)
- Don L. Lee (season 5) and C. S. Lee (season 6) as Master Kim Sun-Yung
- Adam Herschman as Stevie (season 6)
- Christian Carlson as Zenker (season 6)
- Tony Cavalero as Shane Page (season 6)
- Déjà Dée as Dr. Judith (season 6)
- Bethany DeZelle as Grace Nichols (season 6)
- Jewelianna Ramos-Ortiz as Maria Álvarez (season 6)
- Justin Ortiz as Diego Aguilar (season 6) (Note: Ortiz also portrayed an unnamed Cobra Kai student in the third season)
- Caitlin Hutson as Cara McAllistar (season 6)
- Daniel Wheat as Vlad (season 6)
- Josh Banks as Stew (season 6)
- Joshua Lamboy as Sensei Ivanov (season 6)
- Britt Baker as Sensei Oksana (season 6)
- Brian Takahashi as young Mr. Miyagi (season 6)
- Elizabeth Berkley as Winnie Taylor (season 6)
- Kevin Burkhardt as himself (season 6)
- Ryan Clark as himself (season 6)
- Darryl Vidal as himself (season 6)

=== Archival footage ===
The following characters only appear via archival footage from the film series:

- Pat Morita as Mr. Miyagi
- Chad McQueen as Dutch
- Israel Juarbe as Freddy Fernandez
- Pat E. Johnson as The Referee
- Bruce Malmuth as The Announcer
- Nobu McCarthy as Yukie
- Danny Kamekona as Sato Toguchi
- Jonathan Avildsen as Snake

== Episodes ==
Season	Episodes		Originally released	Network
1	10		May 2, 2018	YouTube Red
2	10		April 24, 2019	YouTube Premium
3	10		January 1, 2021	Netflix
4	10		December 31, 2021	Netflix
5	10		September 9, 2022	Netflix
6	15	5	July 18, 2024	Netflix
6	15	5	November 15, 2024	Netflix
6	15	5	February 13, 2025	Netflix

== Production ==
=== Prior pop culture works ===
There were a few works of popular culture prior to Cobra Kai that explored different readings of the first Karate Kid film. In 2007, the music video for the song "Sweep the Leg" by No More Kings stars William Zabka (who also directed the video) as a caricature of himself as Johnny Lawrence, and features references to The Karate Kid (1984), including cameo appearances by Zabka's former co-stars. In a 2010 interview, Zabka jokingly discussed this video in the context of his vision that Johnny was the true hero of the film.

Next in June 2010, Ralph Macchio appeared in Funny or Die's online short, "Wax On, F*ck Off", in which his loved ones stage an intervention to turn the former child star from a well-adjusted family man into an addict besieged with tabloid scandal in order to help his career (with frequent references to The Karate Kid). A recurring joke in the sketch is that Macchio is confused for an adolescent. The short was lauded by TV Guide's Bruce Fretts, who referred to the video as "sidesplitting" and "comic gold".

Finally, in 2013, Macchio and Zabka made guest appearances as themselves in the How I Met Your Mother episode "The Bro Mitzvah", where Macchio is invited to Barney Stinson's bachelor party, leading to Barney shouting that he hates Macchio and that Johnny was the real hero of The Karate Kid. Towards the end of the episode, a clown in the party wipes off his makeup and reveals himself as Zabka. Zabka continued to be a recurring character throughout the ninth season of the show. The creators of Cobra Kai commented on this episode stating that they "appreciate the parallel fandoms that this show has, whether it's the How I Met Your Mother storyline -- which was amazing -- we get asked all the time about that YouTube video if Daniel was the real bully...all that stuff just kind of buoyed us a little bit when we were conceiving the show and comparing the storylines to pitch the show because it made us feel confident that we weren't the only ones, and we didn't think we were, but it was nice to see other creators have Karate Kid on the mind."

=== Development ===
==== Pitch ====
The creators pitched the series in 2017 to outlets that included Netflix, Amazon, Hulu, and AMC, using a mock trailer created with footage from prior works by Macchio and Zabka. The show was ultimately greenlit in August 2017 by the subscription service YouTube Red (later YouTube Premium). Executive producers James Lassiter and Caleeb Pinkett of Overbrook Entertainment in association with Sony Pictures Television joined the Cobra Kai creators.

==== Season releases ====
The first and second seasons launched on YouTube Red / YouTube Premium in May 2018 and April 2019. The creators of the series explored moving to another platform ahead of the season two premiere, but the deal did not go through. The third season was produced for YouTube and was initially set for a 2020 release, but in May 2020, the series left YouTube and moved to Netflix ahead of its third-season premiere. As YouTube was not interested in renewing the series for a fourth season, the producers wanted to find a streaming venue that would leave that option open. The show moved to Netflix in June 2020, taking the third season with them.

The third, fourth, and fifth seasons were released in January 2021, December 2021, and September 2022, respectively. A fourth season was renewed, prior to season three being released, and was released on December 31, 2021. The fifth season premiered on September 9, 2022. Production for the sixth and final season paused during the period of the 2023 Hollywood labor disputes, and resumed after January 1, 2024. Season six was divided into three parts, each consisting of five episodes: part one was released on July 18, 2024, part two was released on November 15, 2024, and part three was released on February 13, 2025.

=== Casting ===
==== General ====
As the "Miyagi-verse" that shapes Cobra Kai consists of characters who interacted with Mr. Miyagi, the series offers a deeper exploration of themes and characters from The Karate Kid (1984), The Karate Kid Part II (1986), and The Karate Kid Part III (1989). All of the main actors, and a few supporting actors, reprise their original roles. With regard to The Karate Kid animated children's show (1989), Hurwitz has stated that he doesn't consider it to be part of the Miyagi-verse canon, but an Easter egg from it appears in season three, in response to the question about its status within Cobra Kai.

In addition, throughout Cobra Kai's run, there was speculation that Hilary Swank might reprise the role of Julie Pierce from The Next Karate Kid (1994). According to Heald, they had a storyline involving Julie related to Mr. Miyagi and the mystery of a stolen necklace, "but before we got too deep, we had to reach out to Hilary and find out would she be willing to come and play with us." At the end of the series in 2025, Heald, Hurwitz, and Scholssberg stated that Swank would not appear as, "people have all sorts of reasons why they will or will not be participating in something, and with the timing of whatever was going on, it just was never an option." However, they also indicated that they will "have to see what might happen in this universe if we're fortunate enough to continue writing within it. She's a character that we have a lot of excitement to revisit."

==== Seasons ====
In season one, Macchio and Zabka reprised their respective roles of Daniel LaRusso and Johnny. Additional The Karate Kid actors included Randee Heller as Daniel's mother Lucille LaRusso, and Martin Kove as John Kreese. The cast list for season one included Xolo Maridueña as Miguel Diaz, Mary Mouser as Daniel's daughter Samantha "Sam" LaRusso, Tanner Buchanan as Johnny's son Robby Keene, and Courtney Henggeler as Daniel's wife Amanda. Ed Asner was cast in a guest role as Johnny's wealthy, verbally abusive step-father, Sid Weinberg. Vanessa Rubio joined the cast as Miguel's mother Carmen.

In season two, Macchio, Zabka, Maridueña, Mouser, Buchanan, and Henggeler all returned, with Jacob Bertrand, Gianni DeCenzo, and Kove being promoted to series regulars, and newcomers Paul Walter Hauser and Peyton List joining the cast. The Karate Kid actors Heller, Rob Garrison (Tommy), Ron Thomas (Bobby), and Tony O'Dell (Jimmy) made guest appearances during this season.

In season three, Macchio, Zabka, Maridueña, Mouser, Buchanan, Henggeler, Bertrand, DeCenzo, and Kove returned. Reprising their roles from The Karate Kid and The Karate Kid II in guest appearances during this season were Elisabeth Shue (Ali Mills), Ron Thomas (Bobby), Tamlyn Tomita (Kumiko), Traci Toguchi (Yuna), and Yuji Okumoto (Chozen Toguchi).

In season four, Rubio and List were promoted to series regulars, while Dallas Dupree Young and Oona O'Brien were cast in recurring roles. In addition, Thomas Ian Griffith reprised his role as Terry Silver from The Karate Kid Part III, while Okumoto and Heller made guest appearances.

In season five, Okumoto had a recurring role as Chozen. In addition, Sean Kanan and Robyn Lively reprised their respective roles as Mike Barnes and Jessica Andrews from Part III. Alicia Hannah-Kim also joined the cast as Kim Da-eun while Young was upgraded to a series regular.

In season six, Kanan returned as Barnes, Griffith returned as Silver, William Christopher Ford reprised his role as Dennis de Guzman from Part III, and Darryl Vidal reprised his role from The Karate Kid. C. S. Lee was cast to portray Master Kim Sun-Yung, a character first referenced by Terry Silver in that film. Lewis Tan, Patrick Luwis, and Rayna Vallandingham joined the cast in supporting roles.

=== Filming ===
Principal photography for the first season began in October 2017 in Atlanta, Georgia. Filming took place at various locations throughout that month at places including Union City, Georgia, Marietta, Georgia, and the Briarcliff Campus of Emory University. In November, shooting moved to locales such as the North Atlanta Soccer Association Tophat fields in East Cobb. In December, the production was working out of Marietta and Conyers. Various exterior shots were also filmed in parts of Los Angeles, California, such as Tarzana and Encino. Exterior locations included Golf N' Stuff in Norwalk and the South Seas Apartments in Reseda, both of which were originally featured in The Karate Kid.

Principal photography for the second season began in September 2018 in Atlanta. In October, production continued around Atlanta with shooting also occurring in Marietta. In November, the series was filming in Union City. In December, shooting transpired at the closed Rio Bravo Cantina restaurant in Atlanta.

Principal photography for the fourth season began in February 2021 and ended in April in Atlanta.

Filming for the fifth season began in September 2021 and finished in December. Like previous seasons, parts were filmed in Atlanta, Marietta, Georgia, and Los Angeles. The Mexico scenes were filmed in Puerto Rico on a two-day filming block, just like the two-day filming block of Okinawa, Japan, and the Tokyo Metropolitan Government Building for the third season.

== Release ==
=== Marketing ===
The series was promoted at the annual Television Critics Association's winter press tour held in January 2018, when YouTube's global head of original content Susanne Daniels described the show: "It is a half an hour format but I would call it a dramedy. I think it leans into the tone of the movie in that there are dramatic moments throughout. I think it's very faithful really in some ways to what the movie set about doing, the lessons imparted in the movie if you will. It's next generation Karate Kid."

Several trailers for the show were released from February to March, before the premiere date was revealed to be May 2.

YouTube Premium released a six-minute commercial parodying ESPN's 30 for 30 in April 2019, featuring the main cast members and select ESPN personalities analyzing the 1984 match between Daniel and Johnny. It was nominated for a Clio Award.

=== Premiere ===
The series held its world premiere on April 24, 2018, at the SVA Theatre in New York City during the annual Tribeca Film Festival. Following the screening, a discussion was held with writers, directors, and executive producers Hayden Schlossberg, Jon Hurwitz, and Josh Heald, in addition to series stars and co-executive producers William Zabka and Ralph Macchio.

YouTube partnered with Fathom Events for special screenings of the first two episodes of the series at around 700 movie theaters across the United States. The event also included a screening of the original film.

== Reception ==
=== Critical response ===
Critical response of Cobra Kai
Season	Rotten Tomatoes	Metacritic
1	100% (49 reviews)	72 (11 reviews)
2	91% (32 reviews)	66 (7 reviews)
3	90% (52 reviews)	72 (15 reviews)
4	95% (42 reviews)	70 (8 reviews)
5	98% (48 reviews)	78 (7 reviews)
6	91% (47 reviews)	67 (11 reviews)

All six seasons of Cobra Kai have received positive critical reviews. At the review aggregator website Rotten Tomatoes, the entire series received a 94% approval rating. On Metacritic, which uses a weighted average, the series holds an average rating of 70 out of 100.

The first season had a positive response from critics. At Rotten Tomatoes, it holds a 100% approval rating, with an average score of 7.5 out of 10 based on 49 reviews. The website's critical consensus reads: "Cobra Kai continues the Karate Kid franchise with a blend of pleasantly corny nostalgia and teen angst, elevated by a cast of well-written characters." Cobra Kai was 2018's best-reviewed TV drama on Rotten Tomatoes. Metacritic assigned the season a score of 72 out of 100 based on 11 critics, indicating "generally favorable reviews".

The second season had a positive response from critics. At the review aggregator website Rotten Tomatoes, it holds an 91% approval rating with an average score of 7.4 out of 10, based on 32 reviews. Its critical consensus reads: "While Cobra Kai's subversive kick no longer carries the same gleeful impact of its inaugural season, its second round is still among the best around – no amount of mid-life crisis and teenage ennui's ever gonna keep it down." Metacritic's weighted average assigned the second season a score of 66 out of 100, based on seven critics, indicating "generally favorable reviews".

The third season of the series had a positive response from critics. At the review aggregator website Rotten Tomatoes, it holds a 90% approval rating, with an average score of 8 out of 10 based on 52 reviews. The website's critical consensus reads: "By pairing its emotional punches with stronger humor, Cobra Kai's third season finds itself in fine fighting form." On Metacritic with its weighted average, assigned a score of 72 out of 100, based on 15 critics, indicating "generally favorable reviews".

The fourth season had a positive response from critics. It received a 95% Rotten Tomatoes approval rating, with an average score of 7.9 out of 10 based on 42 reviews. The website's critical consensus reads: "Cobra Kai still delights in a fourth season that mines great fun from shifting alliances, chiefly the uneasy truce between Johnny Lawrence and Daniel LaRusso." Metacritic's weighted average assigned the fourth season a score of 70 out of 100, based on eight critics, indicating "generally favorable reviews".

The fifth season had a positive response from critics. It received a Rotten Tomatoes approval rating of 98%, with an average rating of 8 out of 10 based on 48 reviews. The site's critical consensus reads: "Deftly managing an expanded roster of punchy personalities, Cobra Kai graduates to a black belt proficiency in heartfelt melodrama and sly humor." On Metacritic, it received a weighted score of 78 out of 100, based on seven critics, indicating "generally favorable reviews".

The sixth and final season had an overall positive response from critics. On the review aggregator website Rotten Tomatoes, 91% of 47 critics' reviews are positive, with an average rating of 7.0/10. The website's consensus reads: "Having achieved mastery over its formula, Cobra Kai's sixth and final season doesn't hit as hard but still maintains excellent form." On Metacritic, it received a weighted score of 67 out of 100, based on 11 critics, indicating "generally favorable reviews".

=== Viewership ===
==== YouTube ====
The first episode, which was posted on YouTube for free along with episode two, had been viewed 5.4 million times within the first 24 hours. While it was noted that the response had been, in part, a result of YouTube releasing the episode for free, it was noted by Cinema Blend's Britt Lawrence that YouTube Red's new series debuted to numbers that made rival streaming services take notice. By October 30, 2018, ahead of the second-season premiere, YouTube was promoting the report that the first episode had then been viewed over 50 million times. The first episode was No. 8 on YouTube's list of ten top-trending videos of 2018.

According to market research company Parrot Analytics, the first season of Cobra Kai was the world's most in-demand streaming television show during May 2018. Parrot Analytics later reported that the second season of Cobra Kai was the world's most in-demand digital television show during April and through May 2019. As of September 2020, the season 1 premiere has over 90 million views, and the season 2 premiere has over 86 million views.

==== Netflix ====
After the series moved to Netflix in August 2020, season 1 and season 2 of Cobra Kai became the most-watched series on the platform. It was the most-watched show on streaming media in the United States between August 29 and September 6, according to Nielsen ratings. During the week, the show's 20 episodes drew nearly 2.2 billion streaming minutes in the United States. The first season was watched on Netflix by 50 million member households in its first four weeks, making Cobra Kai the most-streamed show on Netflix during the month of September 2020.

== Accolades ==
Year	Award	Category	Nominee(s)	Result	Ref.
2018	Teen Choice Awards	Choice Summer TV Show	Cobra Kai	Nominated	
2018	Teen Choice Awards	Choice Summer TV Star	Xolo Maridueña	Nominated	
2018	Imagen Awards	Best Young Actor – Television	Xolo Maridueña	Nominated	
2018	Primetime Creative Arts Emmy Awards	Outstanding Stunt Coordination for a Comedy Series or Variety Program	Hiro Koda	Nominated	
2019	Shorty Awards	Best Web Series	Cobra Kai	Nominated	
2019	Primetime Creative Arts Emmy Awards	Outstanding Stunt Coordination for a Comedy Series or Variety Program	Hiro Koda	Nominated	
2019	Teen Choice Awards	Choice Summer TV Show	Cobra Kai	Nominated	
2019	Clio Awards	Television/Streaming: Social Media-30 for 30	Cobra Kai	Nominated	
2021	Nickelodeon Kids' Choice Awards	Favorite Family TV Show	Cobra Kai	Nominated	
2021	MTV Movie & TV Awards	Best Show	Cobra Kai	Nominated	
2021	MTV Movie & TV Awards	Best Fight	"Finale House Fight"	Nominated	
2021	MTV Movie & TV Awards	Best Musical Moment	"I Wanna Rock"	Nominated	
2021	Screen Actors Guild Awards	Outstanding Performance by a Stunt Ensemble in a Television Series	Cobra Kai	Nominated	
2021	Hollywood Critics Association TV Awards	Best Streaming Series, Comedy	Cobra Kai	Nominated	
2021	Primetime Emmy Awards	Outstanding Comedy Series	Hayden Schlossberg, Jon Hurwitz, Josh Heald, Caleeb Pinkett, Susan Ekins, James Lassiter, Will Smith, Ralph Macchio, William Zabka, Luan Thomas, Joe Piarulli, Michael Jonathan Smith, Stacey Harman, Bob Dearden and Bob Wilson	Nominated	
2021	Primetime Creative Arts Emmy Awards	Outstanding Sound Editing for a Comedy or Drama Series (Half-Hour) and Animation	Patrick Hogan, Jesse Pomeroy, Daniel Salas, Ryne Gierke, AJ Shapiro, Andres Locsey, Shane Bruce and Mitchell Kohen (for "December 19")	Nominated	
2021	Primetime Creative Arts Emmy Awards	Outstanding Sound Mixing for a Comedy or Drama Series (Half-Hour) and Animation	Joe DeAngelis, Chris Carpenter, Mike Filosa and Phil McGowan (for "December 19")	Nominated	
2021	Primetime Creative Arts Emmy Awards	Outstanding Stunt Performance	Jahnel Curfman, Julia Maggio, John Cihangir and Marc Canonizado (for "December 19")	Nominated	
2021	People's Choice Awards	The Show of 2021	Cobra Kai	Nominated	
2021	People's Choice Awards	The Drama Show of 2021	Cobra Kai	Nominated	
2021	People's Choice Awards	The Bingeworthy Show of 2021	Cobra Kai	Nominated	
2022	Critics' Choice Super Awards	Best Action Series	Cobra Kai	Won	
2022	Critics' Choice Super Awards	Best Actor in an Action Series, Limited Series or Made-for-TV Movie	Ralph Macchio	Nominated	
2022	Critics' Choice Super Awards	Best Actor in an Action Series, Limited Series or Made-for-TV Movie	William Zabka	Nominated	
2022	Nickelodeon Kids' Choice Awards	Favorite Family TV Show	Cobra Kai	Nominated	
2022	People's Choice Awards	The Drama Show of 2022	Cobra Kai	Nominated	
2022	Primetime Creative Arts Emmy Awards	Outstanding Sound Editing for a Comedy or Drama Series (Half-Hour) and Animation	Patrick Hogan, Daniel Salas, Jesse Pomeroy, Gary DeLeone, Nick Papalia, Andres Locsey, and Mitchell Cohen (for "The Rise")	Nominated	
2022	Primetime Creative Arts Emmy Awards	Outstanding Stunt Coordination for a Comedy Series or Variety Program	Ken Barefield	Nominated	
2022	Producers Guild of America Awards	Episodic Comedy	Cobra Kai	Nominated	
2022	Saturn Awards	Best Action/Adventure Television Series (Streaming)	Cobra Kai	Nominated	
2022	Screen Actors Guild Awards	Outstanding Performance by a Stunt Ensemble in a Television Series	Cobra Kai	Nominated	
2023	Critics' Choice Super Awards	Best Action Series	Cobra Kai	Won	
2023	Critics' Choice Super Awards	Best Actor in an Action Series, Limited Series or Made-for-TV Movie	Ralph Macchio	Nominated	
2023	Critics' Choice Super Awards	Best Actor in an Action Series, Limited Series or Made-for-TV Movie	William Zabka	Nominated	
2023	Primetime Creative Arts Emmy Awards	Outstanding Stunt Coordination for a Comedy Series or Variety Program	Ken Barefield	Nominated	
2025	Astra TV Awards	Best Cast Ensemble in a Streaming Comedy Series	Cobra Kai	Nominated	
2025	Primetime Creative Arts Emmy Awards	Outstanding Music Composition for a Series (Original Dramatic Score)	Leo Birenberg and Zach Robinson (for "Blood in Blood Out")	Nominated	
2025	Primetime Creative Arts Emmy Awards	Outstanding Stunt Coordination for a Comedy Series or Variety Program	Ken Barefield	Nominated	

== Home media ==
During the show's time on YouTube Red, Cobra Kai was not released on DVD, but once the show made its move to Netflix, Sony Pictures released the first and second seasons in a "Collector's Edition" DVD set on November 24, 2020 in the United States. In 2022, Sony Pictures released the third season in January and the fourth in September, both in the United States. Sony Pictures released the fifth season in September 2023 in the United States. The sixth season DVD and the complete series Blu-ray were released in March 2026 in the United States.

Key
= Available only on DVD
= Available only on Blu-ray
= Available on both DVD & Blu-ray

Season	Release date			
Season	Region 1/A	Region 2/B	Region 2/B (Germany)	Region 4/B
1 & 2	November 12, 2019 (headband version) November 24, 2020 (regular release)	May 4, 2020 (DVD) December 21, 2020 (Blu-ray)	January 14, 2022 (LE)	No release
1	No release	No release	December 17, 2020	August 14, 2019
2	No release	No release	December 17, 2020	May 7, 2020
3	January 11, 2022	January 17, 2022	July 10, 2022 (LE)	January 12, 2022
4	September 13, 2022	October 17, 2022	TBA	November 9, 2022
5	September 12, 2023	October 2, 2023	TBA	October 11, 2023
6	March 3, 2026	TBA	TBA	TBA
The Complete Series	March 3, 2026	TBA	TBA	TBA

== Soundtracks ==
=== Cobra Kai: Wax Off - EP ===
Cobra Kai: Wax Off - EP

EP by Leo Birenberg & Zach Robinson
- Released: July 23, 2021
- Genre: Soundtrack
- Length: 13:45
- Label: Madison Gate Records

Leo Birenberg & Zach Robinson chronology
Cobra Kai: Season 3 (Soundtrack from the Netflix Original Series) (2021)	Cobra Kai: Wax Off - EP (2021)	Cobra Kai: Season 4, Vol.1 "All Valley Tournament 51" (Soundtrack from the Netflix Original Series) (2022)

Madison Gate Records released an extended play entitled Cobra Kai: Wax Off - EP on July 23, 2021, featuring extended versions of four previously released tracks from the first two seasons soundtracks.

==== Track listing ====
All music is composed by Leo Birenberg and Zach Robinson.

No.	Title	Length
1.	"Quiver – Extended"	3:51
2.	"Cobra Guy – Extended"	2:31
3.	"A Badass Name for a Dojo – Extended"	3:02
4.	"Sam and Robby – Extended"	4:20
Total length:		13:45

== Other media ==
=== Daniel LaRusso vs. Johnny Lawrence ===
On April 17, 2019, YouTube Premium released a 30 for 30 featurette for the second season of its web-based series, Cobra Kai, a comedic reboot of The Karate Kid featuring the main cast members and select ESPN personalities analyzing the 1984 match between Daniel LaRusso and Johnny Lawrence. It was nominated for a Clio Award.

=== Books ===
In 2022, Ralph Macchio published the memoir Waxing On: The Karate Kid and Me (Dutton), in which he reflects upon the making of and legacy of the Karate Kid films and Cobra Kai. Also in 2022, the behind-the-scenes book The Kick-A** Book of Cobra Kai was written by Rachel Bertsche and published by HarperCollins.

=== Comics ===
A four-issue comic book miniseries entitled Cobra Kai: The Karate Kid Saga Continues - Johnny's Story was published by IDW Publishing and released between October 2019 and January 2020, and was subsequently collected in trade paperback on July 8, 2020. It was written by Denton J. Tipton, with art by Kagan McLeod and colors by Luis Antonio Delgado.

=== Video games ===
Cobra Kai: The Karate Kid Saga Continues, a video game based on the series, was released for Nintendo Switch, PlayStation 4, and Xbox One on October 27, 2020, and for Microsoft Windows on January 5, 2021.

A mobile game titled Cobra Kai: Card Fighter was released on March 19, 2021, on Android and iOS devices.

A sequel to Cobra Kai: The Karate Kid Saga Continues developed by Flux Games and published by GameMill Entertainment titled Cobra Kai 2: Dojos Rising was released on November 8, 2022, for Nintendo Switch, PlayStation 4, PlayStation 5, Windows via Steam, Xbox One, and Xbox Series X/S.

Characters and elements from Cobra Kai have appeared in the Roblox experience Netflix Nextworld.

=== Board game ===
In 2023, Asmodee released the board game Cobra Kai: Road to Victory.
