= Jon Hurwitz =

American screenwriter and director

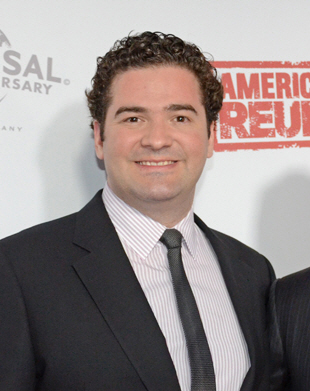
- Hurwitz at the American Reunion premiere in 2012
- Born: Jonathan Benjamin Hurwitz; November 15, 1977 (age 48); Byram, New Jersey, U.S.
- Education: University of Pennsylvania
- Occupations: Screenwriter, director, producer
- Known for: Cobra Kai; Harold & Kumar
- Spouse: Randy Hurwitz (m. 2007)
- Children: 2

Jonathan Benjamin Hurwitz (born November 15, 1977) is an American screenwriter, director, and producer best known for his work on Cobra Kai (with Hayden Schlossberg and Josh Heald), the Harold & Kumar films, and American Reunion (with Schlossberg).

== Early life ==
Hurwitz was born in Byram, New Jersey, to Jewish parents. and lived there for two years. He then moved to Roxbury for 5 years, although following that he grew up mostly in Upper St. Clair Township, Pennsylvania and Randolph, New Jersey. He met Hayden Schlossberg when they both attended Randolph High School.

Hurwitz was studying finance at the University of Pennsylvania, with Josh Heald who lived in the same dorm with him during freshman year. As Schlossberg (who was in college at The University of Chicago) frequently came to visit, he got to know Heald as well.

== Career ==
Hurwitz was studying finance at the University of Pennsylvania, while Schlossberg was a history major at the University of Chicago with plans of attending law school. It was during this time that they sold their first script Filthy to MGM. Upon selling Filthy, they moved to Hollywood to begin their career in the entertainment industry.

The idea for the first Harold and Kumar film, Harold & Kumar Go to White Castle developed while they were living in Los Angeles. Hurwitz and Schlossberg decided to write a low-budget stoner film and base the main characters on their high school friends from Randolph High School. They based the character of Harold on their real-life friend Harold Lee. Hurwitz got the idea to base the film around White Castle from his own experience craving White Castle burgers when he lived in Pennsylvania for several years. At the time, Pennsylvania did not have any White Castle locations and Hurwitz had to have family members bring him frozen White Castle burgers from New Jersey. It was later followed by Harold & Kumar Escape from Guantanamo Bay and A Very Harold & Kumar 3D Christmas. They also wrote and directed the fourth theatrical entry in the American Pie franchise, writing and directing American Reunion (2012). In 2015, the trio signed a deal with Lionsgate.

They notably worked together on Cobra Kai, a continuation of The Karate Kid franchise. Hurwitz & Schlossberg created the show, along with their close friend Josh Heald. The trio serve as executive producers, show runners, writers, and directors on the series. As of 2021, he and his friend Hayden Schlossberg, along with Josh Heald via Counterbalance Entertainment has signed a deal with Sony Pictures Television.

== Filmography ==
Year	Title	Director	Writer	Producer	Notes
2004	Harold & Kumar Go to White Castle	No	Yes	No	
2008	Harold & Kumar Escape from Guantanamo Bay	Yes	Yes	co-producer	
2008	Harold & Kumar Go to Amsterdam	Yes	Yes	No	short film
2011	A Very Harold & Kumar Christmas	No	Yes	co-producer	
2012	American Reunion	Yes	Yes	No	
2018	Blockers	No	No	Yes	
2018−2025	Cobra Kai	Yes	Yes	Executive	Also co-creator
2021	Plan B	No	No	Yes	
2023	Obliterated	Yes	Yes	Yes	
2026	72 Hours	No	Yes	Yes	

== See also ==
- Hayden Schlossberg
- Josh Heald
