= Courtney Henggeler =

American actress (born 1978)

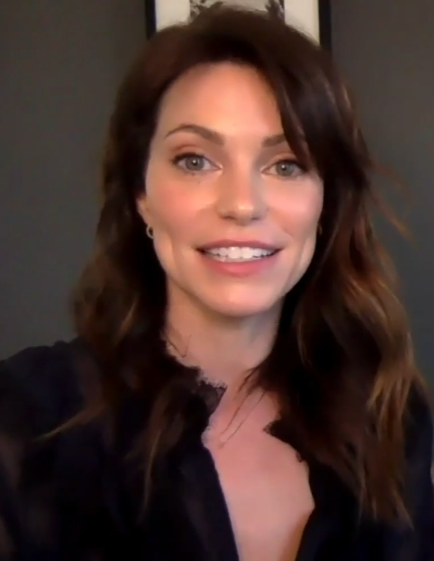
- Henggeler in 2021
- Born: Courtney Healy Henggeler; December 11, 1978 (age 47); Phillipsburg, New Jersey, U.S.
- Occupation: Actress
- Years active: 2003–2025
- Known for: Amanda LaRusso in Cobra Kai; Missy Cooper in The Big Bang Theory
- Spouse: Ross Kohn (m. 2015)
- Children: 2

Courtney Healy Henggeler (/ˈhɛŋɡlər/ born December 11, 1978) is an American former actress known for her starring role as Amanda LaRusso in the Netflix comedy-drama television series Cobra Kai. She is also known for playing Sheldon Cooper's twin sister, Missy, in The Big Bang Theory.

== Early life and education ==
Born on December 11, 1978, in Phillipsburg, New Jersey, Henggeler grew up in Pennsylvania in the Poconos until she moved to her parents' hometown of Seaford, New York, on the South Shore of Long Island at age 14. After graduating from Seaford High School, Henggeler enrolled at SUNY Fredonia but dropped out and moved to Los Angeles two years later, where she received her first acting lessons. Henggeler credits her childhood best friend Patti for making her audition for a high school production of Carousel when Henggeler was in the ninth grade.

== Career ==
2003–2025

Henggeler started her acting career with a main role in the horror B-movie The Bog Creatures in 2003. Two years later, she made a guest appearance in the medical drama House.

In 2008, and again in 2018, Henggeler took on the guest role of Missy Cooper, the twin sister of Sheldon Cooper, in the sitcom The Big Bang Theory.

After other guest roles in various movies and TV shows over the years and a recurring role on the CBS sitcom Mom, Henggeler made her breakthrough in 2018 when she landed a starring role on Cobra Kai as Amanda LaRusso, the wife of the original Karate Kid Daniel LaRusso. In 2019, Henggler was featured in Hulu's episodic holiday horror series Into the Dark.

In April 2025, Henggeler announced her retirement from acting.

== Personal life ==
Henggeler married Ross Kohn in October 2015. They have two children. She is of Italian, Swiss-German and Irish descent.

== Filmography ==
=== Film ===
Year	Title	Role	Notes
2003	The Bog Creatures	Susan Beth	
2005	The Legacy of Walter Frumm	Maid	
2009	Two Dollar Beer	Molly	
2010	True Love	Alexa	
2010	Peas in a Pod	Julie	
2010	Wing Bitches	Courtney	
2011	Friends with Benefits	Flight Attendant	
2012	Hitting the Cycle	Samantha	
2013	Kristin's Christmas Past	Sophia	
2014	Beach Pillows	Courtney	
2017	Fixed	Maria	
2017	Feed	Kate	
2018	Nobody's Fool	Hillary	
2019	Pilgrim	Anna	
2019	Do Not Reply	Laura	
2023	The Boys in the Boat	Hazel Ulbrickson	

=== Television ===
Year	Title	Role	Notes
2005	House	Server	Episode: "DNR"
2008, 2013, 2018	The Big Bang Theory	Missy Cooper	3 episodes
2008	Criminal Minds	Jenna	Episode: "The Crossing"
2009	Roommates	Anna	Episode: "The Trash 'N Treasures"
2009	NCIS	Scorpio Sinn	Episode: "Reunion"
2009	Accidentally on Purpose	Dani	Episode: "Class"
2011	Working Class	Rachel	3 episodes
2011	Happy Endings	Andrea	Episode: "The Quicksand Girlfriend"
2011	Melissa & Joey	Bianca	Episode: "The Mel World"
2011	Family Practice	Chelsea sloop	Television movie
2013	Back in the Game	Keeley	1 episode
2013–2015	Mom	Claudia	5 episodes
2014	Royal Pains	Nancy Conrad	1 episode
2014	Franklin & Bash	Molly Taylor	1 episode
2014	Faking It	Robin Booker	2 episodes
2014	The Mysteries of Laura	Nora	1 episode
2015	Stitchers	Suzanne Parks	1 episode
2016	Mary + Jane	Mandy	1 episode
2016	Henry Danger	Gwen	Episode: "Love Muffin"
2016	Bones	Dr. Jane Levy	Episode: "The Death in the Defense"
2017	Escaping Dad	Stacy Hanson	Television film
2018	Jane the Virgin	Satchet	Episode: "Chapter Seventy-Eight"
2018–2025	Cobra Kai	Amanda LaRusso	Main role
2018	Fuller House	Renee	Episode: "Driving Mr. Jackson"
2019	Into the Dark	Anna	Episode: "Pilgrim"
