= Vanessa Rubio =

American actress

- Born: December 6, 1983 (age 42); New Jersey, U.S.
- Education: New York University
- Occupation: Actress
- Years active: 2010–present
- Notable credit: Carmen Diaz in Cobra Kai

Vanessa Rubio (born December 6, 1983) is an American actress known for her role as Carmen Diaz in the Netflix comedy-drama television series Cobra Kai.

== Early life ==
Rubio was born in and grew up in New Jersey.

Her parents came to New Jersey from Colombia. After she graduated from New York University, she studied in a summer program at American Academy of Dramatic Arts in New York and decided to become an actress. She continued to study and work in different studios.

== Partial filmography ==
=== Television ===
Year	Title	Role	Notes	Refs
2017	Master of None	Hostess	Episode: "Dinner Party"	
2018–2025	Cobra Kai	Carmen Diaz	Recurring role (seasons 1–3); main role (seasons 4–6)	
2019	Dolly Parton's Heartstrings	Cimmaron Rose		
2020	Chilling Adventures of Sabrina	Nagaina	Recurring role (season 3)	
2021	Bonding	Gina		

=== Film ===
Year	Title	Role	Refs
2016	The Hudson Tribes	Bella	
2019	Blood Bound	Elicia	
2025	The Cobra Kai Movie Part II	Herself	
