= Josh Heald =

American screenwriter (born 1977)

- Born: December 12, 1977 (age 48); Red Bank, New Jersey, U.S.
- Education: University of Pennsylvania
- Occupations: Screenwriter, director, producer
- Known for: Cobra Kai; Hot Tub Time Machine

Josh Heald (born December 12, 1977) is an American screenwriter, director, and producer best known for his work on Cobra Kai and Hot Tub Time Machine.

== Early life ==
Heald was born in Red Bank, New Jersey. He was raised in Middletown Township, New Jersey and attended Middletown High School South, where he played the trombone and was a drum major in the school's marching band.

Heald was studying finance at the University of Pennsylvania's Wharton School, with Jon Hurwitz who lived in the same dorm with him during freshman year. As Hurwitz's high school friend Hayden Schlossberg (who was in college at The University of Chicago) frequently came to visit, Heald also got to know him as well.

== Career ==
During his time at Wharton, Heald was the editor-in-chief of 34th Street magazine, and he briefly considered a career in journalism. Ultimately, he accepted a position in finance, but was laid off during the Dot-com bust in 2001. He then joined Hurwitz and Schlossberg in Los Angeles, where he worked as a screenwriter.

Heald notably worked on Cobra Kai, a continuation of The Karate Kid franchise with Hurwitz & Schlossberg. The trio serve as executive producers, show runners, writers, and directors on the series. More recently they all signed a deal with Sony Pictures Television.

== Filmography ==
Year	Title	Director	Writer	Producer	Actor
2008	Harold & Kumar Escape from Guantanamo Bay	No	No	No	Yes
2010	Hot Tub Time Machine	No	Yes	No	Yes
2011	Mardi Gras: Spring Break	No	Yes	No	No
2015	Hot Tub Time Machine 2	No	Yes	No	Yes
2018−2025	Cobra Kai	Yes	Yes	Yes	No
2021	Plan B	No	No	Yes	No
2023	Obliterated	Yes	Yes	Yes	No
2026	72 Hours	No	No	Yes	No

== See also ==
- Jon Hurwitz
- Hayden Schlossberg
