= Cobra Kai season 5 =

Cobra Kai
- Season 5
- Promotional poster
- Showrunners: Josh Heald; Jon Hurwitz; Hayden Schlossberg
- Starring: Ralph Macchio; William Zabka; Courtney Henggeler; Xolo Maridueña; Tanner Buchanan; Mary Mouser; Jacob Bertrand; Peyton List; Dallas Dupree Young; Vanessa Rubio; Thomas Ian Griffith; Martin Kove
- No. of episodes: 10

Release
- Original network: Netflix
- Original release: September 9, 2022

Season chronology
- ← Previous; Season 4 Next → Season 6

The fifth season of Cobra Kai, also known as Cobra Kai V, was released to Netflix on September 9, 2022, and consisted of 10 episodes. The series is a sequel to the original films of The Karate Kid franchise, focusing on the characters of Daniel LaRusso and Johnny Lawrence over 30 years after the original film. This is the third season to be released on Netflix.

After his success at the All-Valley, Terry Silver, now sole owner of Cobra Kai, seeks to expand the dojo across the valley. Thus, Daniel and a new ally Chozen Toguchi attempt to finally defeat him. Meanwhile, Johnny attempts to repair the rivalry between Robby and Miguel.

The season has twelve starring roles, eleven of which returned from the previous season. Dallas Dupree Young was promoted to main cast after recurring in the previous season, and Gianni DeCenzo was demoted to a recurring cast member, being credited as a "special guest star". The season was met with generally positive reviews from critics.

== Cast and characters ==
=== Main ===
- Ralph Macchio as Daniel LaRusso
- William Zabka as Johnny Lawrence
- Courtney Henggeler as Amanda LaRusso
- Xolo Maridueña as Miguel Diaz
- Tanner Buchanan as Robby Keene
- Mary Mouser as Samantha LaRusso
- Jacob Bertrand as Eli "Hawk" Moskowitz
- Peyton List as Tory Nichols
- Dallas Dupree Young as Kenny Payne
- Vanessa Rubio as Carmen Diaz
- Thomas Ian Griffith as Terry Silver
- Martin Kove as John Kreese

=== Recurring ===
- Gianni DeCenzo as Demetri Alexopoulos
- Yuji Okumoto as Chozen Toguchi
- Joe Seo as Kyler Park
- Nathaniel Oh as Nathaniel
- Griffin Santopietro as Anthony LaRusso
- Aedin Mincks as Mitch
- Khalil Everage as Chris
- Owen Morgan as Bert
- Oona O'Brien as Devon Lee
- Paul Walter Hauser as Raymond "Stingray" Porter
- Alicia Hannah-Kim as Kim Da-Eun
- Owen Harn as Gabriel

=== Notable guests ===
- Luis Roberto Guzmán as Hector Salazar
- Annalisa Cochrane as Yasmine
- Hannah Kepple as Moon Taylor
- Bret Ernst as Louie LaRusso Jr.
- Dan Ahdoot as Anoush Norouzi
- Rose Bianco as Rosa Diaz
- Sean Kanan as Mike Barnes
- Diora Baird as Shannon Keene
- Robyn Lively as Jessica Andrews
- Sunny Mabrey as Elizabeth-Anne Rooney / Lizzie-Anne
- Barrett Carnahan as young John Kreese
- Nick Marini as young Terry Silver
- Terry Serpico as Captain George Turner
- Carsten Norgaard as Gunther Braun
- Julia Macchio as Vanessa LaRusso

== Episodes ==
Cobra Kai season 5 episodes
| No. overall | No. in season | Title | Directed by | Written by | Original release date |
|---|---|---|---|---|---|
| 41 | 1 | "Long, Long Way from Home" | Joel Novoa & Steven Tsuchida | Michael Jonathan Smith | September 9, 2022 |
Silver begins his planned expansion of Cobra Kai, opening up a flagship dojo in Encino and acquiring local dojos across the San Fernando Valley. Johnny and Robby travel to Mexico in search of Miguel, who is looking for his biological father, Hector Salazar. Robby is initially displeased with the aim of their trip and wishes to return home, but relents after helping his father take on a group of Australian scammers attempting to pickpocket them. Miguel eventually finds Hector, who has since married a woman named Maria, who has a young son named Luis from a previous relationship. After saving Luis from the path of an oncoming vehicle, Miguel is invited by Maria and Hector to stay with his family as a reward. Meanwhile, Daniel shuts down Miyagi-Do Karate as part of his deal with Cobra Kai. While spying on Silver with Daniel, Chozen recognizes Silver's moves and deduces that his sensei is Kim Sun-Yung, a martial artist and master of Tang Soo Do whose teaching style is based on deception. Daniel and Chozen concoct a plan to expose Silver's maniacal nature to the Valley, which involves Chozen posing as a local sensei auditioning alongside other Senseis that Silver is looking to hire.
| 42 | 2 | "Molé" | Steven Tsuchida | Joe Piarulli & Luan Thomas | September 9, 2022 |
In 1972, a young Chozen trains under his uncle Sato. Johnny and Robby get their van towed, forcing them to participate in a spicy pepper challenge to get the money back. Robby wins the competition by eating the spiciest pepper available, although he later reveals he cheated and ate candy Johnny gave him earlier in the trip. Miguel discovers that Hector doesn't know he has a son. Miguel confronts his mother, who warns that Hector is dangerous. Miguel accompanies Hector to an underground fight ring, where it is implied that Hector is a wanted man due to his shady history in Ecuador. Miguel realizes his mother is right and flees right before being found by Johnny, who tearfully reunites with him. Meanwhile, Silver introduces his new lineup of Senseis to his students. Tory meets Chozen, who senses her immense guilt. Tory confronts Silver about paying off the referee to ensure Cobra Kai's victory at the All-Valley Tournament. When Silver invites Chozen over to dinner later that day, he discovers Chozen's true identity due to a toast the two shared during dinner. He has the other Senseis attack him, but Chozen easily defeats them and tells Silver to stay away from the LaRussos.
| 43 | 3 | "Playing with Fire" | Marielle Woods | Mattea Greene | September 9, 2022 |
Upon Johnny's return from Mexico, Carmen tells him she thinks she might be pregnant. Not wanting to fail the baby like he failed Robby, Johnny gets advice from a YouTube tutorial on preparing and cleaning up his apartment, later learning that Carmen is pregnant. Meanwhile, Miguel thinks Sam wants to break up with him, so Demetri and Eli give him various ways to win her over, including buying an octopus necklace. Meanwhile, Sam, Yasmine, and Moon go on a spa day to help Sam figure out who she really is, during which she confronts her past, including an evil version of herself, in a sensory deprivation tank. Sam and Miguel meet at Miyagi-Do, where Sam tells him she needs a break to figure out who she is. Miguel discards the necklace. Daniel and Chozen track down Silver's old associate, Mike Barnes, after deducing that Silver will call upon old friends for help, only to discover that he is a changed man and has cut ties with Silver. Barnes apologizes to Daniel for how harshly he treated him during the 1985 All-Valley Tournament (Note: As depicted in The Karate Kid Part III (1989)) and gives him the number of Silver's former attorney. Upon discovering that Daniel used Barnes for help, Silver burns Barnes' furniture store in retaliation.
| 44 | 4 | "Downward Spiral" | Steve Pink | Ashley Darnall | September 9, 2022 |
Johnny receives a visit from Shannon, who has come to pick up Robby so he can spend the summer with her parents. Upon learning Carmen is pregnant, Shannon recommends that Johnny get a rideshare driver job. Johnny's first day does not go as planned, with him getting multiple one-star reviews due to his questionable driving, loud music, and unsanitary habits. He contemplates quitting, but he gets inspired by a pawn shop owner to continue working to provide for his new family, later asking Shannon for a second chance with Robby by having him stay with Johnny instead. Meanwhile, the teens get into a feud at a local waterpark. Tory and Eli race a waterslide to determine which dojo gets to stay. Tory wins, but the other teens discover that they cheated by giving Eli a tube with a hole in it. They get into a fight and are all kicked out. Robby wants Tory to leave Cobra Kai since he knows all the students are getting brainwashed by Silver. Tory reluctantly refuses, which leads to Robby breaking up with her. Daniel and Amanda go to a charity auction, which they discover is being hosted by Silver, who aggravates Daniel, causing him to embarrass Amanda in front of the attendees. Furious at Daniel for ruining her chance of getting a spot on the charity board and for refusing to let his rivalry with Silver go for one day, Amanda leaves for her mother's house in Columbus, Ohio and takes the children with her.
| 45 | 5 | "Extreme Measures" | Jennifer Celotta | Bob Dearden | September 9, 2022 |
Johnny tries numerous times to get Miguel and Robby to befriend each other, but they refuse due to their history together. After reminiscing with Daniel about their past, Johnny has the two boys fight each other to help them overcome their rivalry. They reconcile, during which Johnny accidentally reveals that Carmen is pregnant, much to their joy. Daniel, who has begun drinking heavily due to being depressed over Amanda's departure, receives a newspaper clipping via mail implying that Stingray lied about Kreese assaulting him, which leads to him and Chozen visiting him. Stingray now lives a luxurious life, having been bribed by Silver to lie at Kreese's trial. He refuses to talk, which leads to a brief confrontation. When Daniel returns to apologize to Stingray for berating him earlier, he is ambushed by Silver and beaten severely, leaving him demoralized. In Ohio, Amanda learns from her cousin and Daniel's old friend, Jessica Andrews, about how Silver tormented him in 1985. Finally, after learning how twisted Silver actually is, Amanda and the children return home to care for an injured Daniel. Meanwhile, Tory (who reluctantly and anonymously gave Daniel the tip) and an imprisoned Kreese scheme to take Silver down.
| 46 | 6 | "Ouroboros" | Joel Novoa | Michael Jonathan Smith | September 9, 2022 |
Silver recruits a group of Senseis from South Korea led by Kim Da-Eun, the granddaughter of his and Kreese's master Kim Sun-Yung. They take over a local dojo, Topanga Karate, and rebrand it as Cobra Kai, merging it into his new string of dojos. Kim forces the students into a brutal combat tournament as a test, during which former Eagle Fang student Devon Lee fails to defeat Tory. Devon joins Cobra Kai the next day due to her being in Topanga. In prison, Kreese is harassed by a group of inmates but refuses to react, hoping to get a parole hearing so he can be released. Upon discovering that his parole hearing has been denied, Kreese fights with the group of inmates, earning their respect. Meanwhile, Daniel gives up karate and returns to work at the car dealership full time, prompting Johnny and Chozen to confront Silver at the Topanga dojo, only to fight Hyan-woo instead. The duo are forced to flee when Da-Eun shows up with the rest of the Senseis. Amanda takes Daniel to the Miyagi-Do dojo, where he visits Mr. Miyagi's old room and reconciles with Robby, who has rejoined Miyagi-Do. Inspired by the combined efforts of the Miyagi-Do & Eagle Fang students, Johnny, and Chozen, Daniel decides to continue fighting.
| 47 | 7 | "Bad Eggs" | Joel Novoa | Joe Piarulli & Luan Thomas | September 9, 2022 |
In 1980, Kreese and Silver train in South Korea under Master Kim. Johnny and Daniel visit Kreese to discover Silver's goal, leaving Chozen as the students' sensei for the day. Chozen issues a challenge in which the students must each protect an egg from being destroyed, but they all fail. On their second attempt, the students win when they cooperate to protect the eggs at Anthony's suggestion. At Cobra Kai, Silver and Da-Eun split the students into two groups, the boys and the girls, and have two students from each group work together to combat a respective sensei. Tory and Devon are paired up and fail to defeat Da-Eun, while Kenny and Kyler are paired up and fail to work together when Kyler deems himself superior to Kenny. After a pep talk from Silver, Kenny beats Kyler as a distraction and manages to hit Sensei Odell by himself. During their visit, Johnny and Daniel trick Kreese into revealing Silver's plans to enroll Cobra Kai into the Sekai Taikai, the most elite karate tournament in the world, so that Cobra Kai can go worldwide.
| 48 | 8 | "Taikai" | Marielle Woods | Ashley Darnall | September 9, 2022 |
A Sekai Taikai selection committee meets with Silver at the main Cobra Kai dojo. Daniel, Johnny, Chozen, and Amanda intrude and try to convince the judges to let Miyagi-Do and Eagle Fang try out for the tournament. They do so, and both dojos show them their techniques. Impressed by both dojos, the judges hold a tournament-style presentation to decide which will participate in the Sekai Taikai, with each dojo deciding on one female and one male fighter. Miyagi-Do and Eagle Fang choose Sam and Eli, while Cobra Kai chooses Tory and Kenny. Kreese gives up on his scheme and tells Tory to look after herself, which angers her as she worked with him for nothing. Sam finds the discarded octopus necklace Miguel bought for her in the ground at Miyagi-Do. Later, Kenny defeats Eli by using the 'Silver Bullet' strike Silver taught him to knock the wind out of him. Realizing Silver bribed the referee in charge of the presentation, Tory flees before her and Sam's fight, forcing Devon to take her place. Despite the rigged match, Sam still defeats Devon, and the committee lets both dojos join the Sekai Taikai. A remorseful Tory arrives at a party at Johnny's apartment and admits to Sam that Silver rigged their match at the All-Valley tournament.
| 49 | 9 | "Survivors" | Steven Tsuchida | Michael Jonathan Smith | September 9, 2022 |
Sam lashes out at Tory following her confession due to her not doing anything about the tournament being rigged. Later, during training, Silver and Da-Eun punish and torture Tory for deserting the fight the previous day by forcing her to punch through a stone dummy, heavily injuring her hand and making it bleed. Robby attempts to persuade the Cobra Kai students to quit, but they ignore him. Sam, Miguel, Demetri, Hawk, and Bert approach Stingray at his house, who uses a Dungeons & Dragons scenario to recount the true story of the assault, admitting he is too scared of Silver to confess the truth. Sam gives Tory another chance, discovering her mother's illness, and they hatch a plan with the other students to acquire evidence of Silver's crimes to show to the Cobra Kais. After Silver discovers Carmen's pregnancy in a hospital encounter, she and Johnny inform Daniel, Amanda, and Chozen, and the five go clubbing to celebrate. Chozen admits to Johnny and Daniel that he is in love with Kumiko, and he leaves her a voicemail message. Amanda and Carmen head home while Johnny, Daniel, and Chozen continue their night out, only for their limo to be hijacked while on their way to another bar, with Chozen believing that Silver did it.
| 50 | 10 | "Head of the Snake" | Joel Novoa | Bob Dearden | September 9, 2022 |
In prison, Kreese is presumably killed as he tries showing mercy towards a cellmate. A vengeful Mike Barnes, who hijacked the limo, decides to launch an attack on Silver and his Senseis at his mansion, and Johnny and Chozen join him. Barnes is quickly subdued while Chozen and Silver fight to the death, ending with Chozen being wounded. Meanwhile, Johnny, despite being wounded, becomes motivated after seeing the ultrasound of his unborn baby and manages to defeat the Cobra Kai Senseis with last-second assistance from Barnes. Simultaneously, the Miyagi-Fangs, led by Tory and Sam, go to the main Cobra Kai dojo and hack the server to procure footage of Silver assaulting Stingray, but when they find out the footage was deleted, they decide to upload the video of Tory's confrontation with Silver. Tired of being mocked, Mitch defects to the Cobra Kai students, warning them about Tory and the Miyagi-Fangs' plan. A fight between Tory and the Miyagi-Fangs vs. Cobra Kai ensues, soon joined by Da-Eun. Devon switches sides and helps Tory fight Da-Eun. As the footage is being uploaded, the Miyagi-Fangs make their last stand as Anthony successfully plays the video on the dojo screens via YouTube. Daniel, Amanda, Carmen, and a remorseful Stingray arrive at the dojo, as does Silver, who desperately tries to sway back his Cobra Kai students, but they do not respond to him. Silver challenges Daniel to a fight, during which Daniel uses the QuickSilver method against him, eventually finishing him off using a crane kick. Silver is arrested as his students desert him. Tory and Robby reconcile, as do Sam and Miguel. A wounded Chozen arrives while Barnes steals The Storm on the Sea of Galilee from Silver to compensate for his furniture store. Daniel, Johnny, and their students celebrate their victory over Cobra Kai. However, unknown to everyone, Kreese is revealed to have faked his death and escaped from prison.

== Production ==
=== Development ===
In August 2021, ahead of the fourth season premiere, the series was renewed for a fifth season.

=== Casting ===
All main cast members from the previous season returned for the fifth, with Gianni DeCenzo now being credited as a "special guest appearance". Sean Kanan and Robyn Lively guest starred as Mike Barnes and Jessica Andrews respectively, reprising their roles from The Karate Kid Part III. In addition to Kanan and Lively returning, Alicia Hannah-Kim joined the cast as Kim Da-eun. Dallas Dupree Young, who portrays Kenny Payne, was upped to a series regular role after recurring during the fourth season.

=== Filming ===
Filming for the fifth season began in September 2021 and finished in December. Like previous seasons, parts were filmed in Atlanta, Georgia, Marietta, Georgia and Los Angeles, California. The Mexico scenes were filmed in Puerto Rico on a two-day filming block, just like the two-day filming block of Okinawa, Japan and the Tokyo Metropolitan Government Building in Tokyo, Japan for the third season.

=== Music ===
Music used during the season primarily highlighted that from the 1980s. Featured artists included Billy Idol, Jon Bon Jovi, and Van Halen. Other songs such as "Eye of the Tiger" by Survivor and Dead or Alive's "You Spin Me Round (Like a Record)" were also used.

==== Soundtracks ====
Leo Birenberg and Zach Robinson once again returned to compose for the season. Madison Gate Records released two digital soundtrack albums on September 16, 2022. La-La Land Records distributed physical CD releases which featured 13 additional tracks across the two volumes. A single from the first volume, "Once Upon a Time in the Valley", was released a month earlier on August 19. Matt Ryan Tobin designed the cover art for the albums.

===== Volume 1 =====
Cobra Kai: Season 5, Vol.1 (Soundtrack from the Netflix Original Series)

Soundtrack album by Leo Birenberg & Zach Robinson
- Released: September 16, 2022
- Length: 61:04 (Note: The length listed represents the digital release of the album and does not include the bonus tracks featured on the CD releases.)
- Labels: La-La Land; Madison Gate
- Producers: Leo Birenberg; Zach Robinson

Leo Birenberg & Zach Robinson chronology
| Cobra Kai: Season 4, Vol.2 (Soundtrack from the Netflix Original Series) (2022) | ''Cobra Kai: Season 5, Vol.1 (Soundtrack from the Netflix Original Series)'' (2022) | Cobra Kai: Season 5, Vol.2 (Soundtrack from the Netflix Original Series) (2022) |

Singles from Cobra Kai: Season 5, Vol.1
- 1. "Once Upon a Time in the Valley" Released: August 19, 2022

All music is composed by Leo Birenberg & Zach Robinson.

| No. | Title | Length |
|---|---|---|
| 1. | "Once Upon a Time in the Valley" | 2:53 |
| 2. | "Ceuta, Mexico" | 2:48 |
| 3. | "Gasoline" | 1:34 |
| 4. | "The Legend of Master Kin Sun-Yung" | 2:25 |
| 5. | "Welcome to Cobra Kai" | 1:45 |
| 6. | "A Coward's Shortcut" | 1:28 |
| 7. | "Enchilados" | 2:05 |
| 8. | "Serenade for Silver" | 3:23 |
| 9. | "White Lightning" | 1:14 |
| 10. | "Karii" | 1:54 |
| 11. | "Sensei Joe" | 2:03 |
| 12. | "Karate's Bad Boy" | 2:16 |
| 13. | "Cleanin' for the Boys" | 3:01 |
| 14. | "Sensory Deprivation" | 2:28 |
| 15. | "Pulpo" | 3:14 |
| 16. | "Won't Back Down" | 1:05 |
| 17. | "Race" | 1:32 |
| 18. | "Steiner Family Reunion" | 0:49 |
| 19. | "Helping Friend" | 1:23 |
| 20. | "Sworn Enemies" | 3:12 |
| 21. | "Actions Have Consequences" | 4:57 |
| 22. | "Take the Stick" | 2:10 |
| 23. | "Ghosts of Kreesemas Past" | 3:10 |
| 24. | "The Eagle and the Lion" | 1:30 |
| 25. | "Wake and Snake" | 1:45 |
| 26. | "Miyagi's Room" | 2:34 |
| 27. | "All of Us" | 2:11 |
| Total length: | | 61:04 |

La-La Land Records bonus tracks
| No. | Title | Length |
|---|---|---|
| 1. | "Miguel in Mexico" | 1:14 |
| 2. | "Silver's Legacy" | 2:24 |
| 3. | "Slither In" | 1:27 |
| 4. | "Techtown" | 1:16 |
| 5. | "Bonsai Auction" | 1:12 |
| 6. | "Enough is Enough" | 1:04 |
| 7. | "Master Toguchi" | 3:37 |
| 8. | "Military Unit" | 1:45 |
| 9. | "Kim Fights" | 1:50 |

===== Volume 2 =====
Cobra Kai: Season 5, Vol.2 (Soundtrack from the Netflix Original Series)

Soundtrack album by Leo Birenberg & Zach Robinson
- Released: September 16, 2022
- Length: 71:44
- Labels: La-La Land; Madison Gate
- Producers: Leo Birenberg; Zach Robinson

Leo Birenberg & Zach Robinson chronology
| Cobra Kai: Season 5, Vol.1 (Soundtrack from the Netflix Original Series) (2022) | ''Cobra Kai: Season 5, Vol.2 (Soundtrack from the Netflix Original Series)'' (2022) | Cobra Kai 2: Dojos Rising (Original Game Soundtrack) (2022) |

All music is composed by Leo Birenberg & Zach Robinson, except where noted.

| No. | Title | Length |
|---|---|---|
| 1. | "Strike First (Extended)" | 2:07 |
| 2. | "Terry Silver's Karate" | 1:47 |
| 3. | "Pain Does Not Exist" | 1:29 |
| 4. | "Silence of the Senseis" | 1:28 |
| 5. | "Adapt or Extinct" | 1:38 |
| 6. | "Globo Kai" | 1:35 |
| 7. | "Yanbaru Kuina" | 2:17 |
| 8. | "Direct Competition" | 1:07 |
| 9. | "Silver Bullet" | 1:25 |
| 10. | "First to Three" | 1:01 |
| 11. | "World of Payne" | 2:51 |
| 12. | "The Better Fighter" | 3:39 |
| 13. | "Reached an Agreement" | 1:33 |
| 14. | "Dungeons and Dojos" | 0:53 |
| 15. | "Stone Dummy" | 2:45 |
| 16. | "Proud and Noble Warrior" | 3:04 |
| 17. | "You Ruined My Life" | 2:37 |
| 18. | "Head of Snake" | 1:54 |
| 19. | "Stranded" | 1:02 |
| 20. | "Cobra Hack" | 0:43 |
| 21. | "Two Fronts" | 0:42 |
| 22. | "Cobra from the Future" | 0:59 |
| 23. | "Sins of the Serpent" | 2:16 |
| 24. | "Stingrays See Better in the Dark" | 1:05 |
| 25. | "The Fifth Battle of Kawanakajima" | 5:10 |
| 26. | "Finish Him" | 3:14 |
| 27. | "Valley Carnage" | 1:00 |
| 28. | "Protect the Egg" | 2:24 |
| 29. | "Upload Finished" | 1:10 |
| 30. | "Life Isn't a Fairy Tale, It's a Competition" | 2:37 |
| 31. | "The Tree Will Survive" | 2:28 |
| 32. | "Flesh Wound" | 4:59 |
| 33. | "My Way" (Composed by Claude François, Gilles Thibaut, Jacques Revaux, Paul Anka; performed by Anka; produced by Birenberg and Robinson) | 4:24 |
| Total length: | | 71:44 |

La-La Land Records bonus tracks
| No. | Title | Length |
|---|---|---|
| 1. | "Leaders and Followers" | 0:59 |
| 2. | "Chozen's Love" | 1:32 |
| 3. | "Central Server" | 0:57 |
| 4. | "Jello" | 1:12 |

== Marketing and release ==
The first teaser trailer for the season was released on May 5, 2022, which confirmed a September 9 release date. The official trailer was released on August 16. The complete fifth season was released on DVD on September 12, 2023.

== Reception ==
On the review aggregator website Rotten Tomatoes, the season has received a 98% approval rating, with an average rating of 7.9 out of 10 based on 44 reviews. The site's critical consensus reads: "Deftly managing an expanded roster of punchy personalities, Cobra Kai graduates to a black belt proficiency in heartfelt melodrama and sly humor". On Metacritic, which uses a weighted average, it has received a rating of 78 out of 100, based on seven reviews, indicating "generally favorable" reviews.

Between September 4 and October 9, 2022, the show was watched for 274.72M hours globally according to the Netflix top 10s.
