= Mr. Miyagi =

Fictional character from The Karate Kid franchise

- The Karate Kid character
- Pat Morita as Mr. Miyagi in The Karate Kid
- First appearance: The Karate Kid (1984)
- Last appearance: "Skeletons" (Cobra Kai, season 6) (2025)
- Created by: Robert Mark Kamen
- Portrayed by: Pat Morita; Brian Takahashi (Cobra Kai season 6 flashback)
- Voiced by: Robert Ito; Pat Morita
- Stunt double: Fumio Demura
- Born: June 9, 1925
- Died: November 15, 2011 (age 86)

In-universe information
- Full name: Nariyoshi Keisuke Miyagi
- Titles: Staff Sergeant (US Army); Sensei
- Affiliation: Miyagi-Dô Karate
- Fighting style: Gōjū-ryū (Karate)
- Family: unnamed father (Karate Kid II)
- Spouses: unnamed wife who died in childbirth, referenced in The Karate Kid
- Significant other: Yukie
- Children: unnamed newborn who died at birth, referenced in The Karate Kid
- Relatives: Miyagi Shimpo (ancestor, Gōjū-ryū inventor)
- Religion: Shinto
- Nationality: Okinawan American
- Teacher: unnamed father
- Students: Jack Pierce; Daniel LaRusso; Julie Pierce; Samantha LaRusso
- Awards: Medal of Honor

Nariyoshi Keisuke Miyagi (Japanese: 成芳 宮城圭介), better known as Mr. Miyagi, is a fictional character of Robert Mark Kamen's The Karate Kid franchise, appearing in The Karate Kid (1984), The Karate Kid Part II (1986), The Karate Kid Part III (1989), and The Next Karate Kid (1994). He was portrayed by Japanese-American actor Pat Morita. A wise, Okinawan-born karate master, he mentors Daniel LaRusso in the first three films (1984–1989) and Julie Pierce in the fourth film (1994).

The sequel series Cobra Kai (2018–2025), produced after Morita's death in 2005, frequently references Miyagi through dialogue, archival images, archival footage, and briefly with a CG altered body double, and follows Daniel as he reopens Miyagi-Do as its sensei to continue his mentor's teachings. The series also uncovers secrets in Mr. Miyagi's past.

In addition to The Karate Kid films, the character has made appearances in The Karate Kid animated television series and a Broadway musical. Cobra Kai is thematically structured around the concept of the Miyagi-Verse.

Morita was recognized for his role as Mr. Miyagi with nominations for an Academy Award for Best Supporting Actor at the 57th Academy Awards ceremony and a Golden Globe Award for Best Actor in a Supporting Role.

== Concept and creation ==
=== Writing ===
The character originated in a screenplay written for The Karate Kid by American screenwriter Robert Mark Kamen. In his youth, Kamen had experienced bullying at the 1964 World's Fair in New York and subsequently turned to karate. He was trained in Okinawan Gōjū-ryū, a defensive style of karate by a sensei who spoke poor English. Kamen stated that Mr. Miyagi was named after Chōjun Miyagi, the founder of the Gōjū-ryū karate style, and that Fumio Demura was the inspiration for the character. Additionally, the famous chopstick scene is thought to have been inspired by martial artist Kōtarō Yoshida, whose students Mas Oyama and Richard Kim independently recounted stories of seeing Yoshida catch flies with chopsticks, which he claimed he trained to do by first starting with larger insects and working down to flies with hundreds of thousands of failures before perseverance paid off.

=== Casting ===
The original preferred choice for the role was Toshiro Mifune, who had appeared in the Akira Kurosawa films Rashomon (1950), Seven Samurai (1954), and The Hidden Fortress (1958), but the actor did not speak English. Pat Morita later auditioned for the role, but was initially rejected for the part due to his close association with stand-up comedy, and with the character Arnold from Happy Days. Producer Jerry Weintraub in particular did not want Morita, as he saw him as a comedic actor. Morita eventually tested five times before Weintraub himself offered him the role, ultimately winning it because he grew a beard and patterned his accent after his uncle. After he was cast and although he had been using the name Pat for years, Weintraub suggested that he be billed with his given name to sound "more ethnic".

== Characterization ==
In The Karate Kid films, Mr. Miyagi is portrayed as a strange older man who teaches Daniel LaRusso karate underlined by honor and discipline. Being a spiritual and non-violent man, he instills wisdom in his teachings. This makes him an outsider in comparison with the no mercy philosophy of Cobra Kai. Miyagi is eccentric, making his first appearance trying to catch flies with chopsticks, but has an impressive knowledge of karate. Over the course of his training, Mr. Miyagi becomes a father figure to Daniel. Macchio described Mr. Miyagi as "that special human Yoda character that we all wish we had as we navigated our childhood".

Initially referred to only as Mr. Miyagi in The Karate Kid, the character's backstory was explored in the sequel The Karate Kid Part II, particularly his upbringing in Okinawa. His name was given as Nariyoshi Miyagi, which later appeared on his tombstone in Cobra Kai. In The Next Karate Kid, his first name was inexplicably changed to Keisuke. When considering this continuity error, Jon Hurwitz explained that the Cobra Kai creators considered the second film to be more meaningful in relation to the character's backstory but felt that his name could be Nariyoshi Keisuke Miyagi.

The Karate Kid provides insight into the character's difficult past during a scene where he drunkenly shows Daniel a photograph of his wife, who died in childbirth along with their son. Born on June 9, 1925, Mr. Miyagi left Okinawa at the age of 18 (1943 or 1944). Notwithstanding the Immigration Act of 1924, which prohibited immigration from Japan, he emigrated to the United States after defying convention and unsuccessfully declaring his love for Yukie, a girl intended to marry his best friend Sato. He meets his future wife while working in the cane fields in Hawaii. After President Franklin D. Roosevelt signed Executive Order 9066 in 1942, shortly after the onset of World War II, Miyagi and his wife are forcibly relocated to Manzanar, a Japanese-American internment camp in California. During this time, he serves overseas in the 442nd Regimental Combat Team in the United States Army, for which he receives the highest military award, the Medal of Honor, but loses his wife and son in childbirth. Weintraub wanted to cut the drunken scene, believing that it slowed down the film, but Avildsen and Kamen insisted on retaining it as they considered it to be the film's emotional core. Kamen wanted the scene to remind American viewers about the Japanese-Americans who were moved to American internment camps during World War II and those that fought in the 442nd regiment who were awarded more Medals of Honor than any other regiment. Morita particularly related to this aspect of his character's backstory, having himself been placed in an internment camp in his youth.

== Appearances ==
=== The Karate Kid (1984) ===
In the Fall of 1984, Miyagi is working as a maintenance man at the South Seas apartment complex when Daniel LaRusso and his mother moved in. When Daniel throws away his bike after it is damaged in an ambush by Johnny Lawrence and other members of Cobra Kai, Miyagi repairs and returns it. He later rescues Daniel after he is beaten up by the same bullies. When Daniel realizes that Miyagi saved him, he asks to be taught karate. Miyagi initially declines, wanting instead to prevent the bullying entirely. A meeting with John Kreese – a former Special Forces veteran running the Cobra Kai dojo and the bullies' sensei – proves largely futile. Kreese consents to a cessation of hostilities until the time of The All-Valley Karate tournament, where Daniel and the Cobra Kai students will compete. Miyagi starts Daniel's training with several seemingly non-karate-related house chores, albeit with specific rhythmic patterns: the first day of training sees Daniel waxing Miyagi's various cars; on the second, he sands the wooden floors of Miyagi's house; on the third, he paints a fence with vertical strokes; on the fourth, he paints Miyagi's house with horizontal strokes. Not understanding his mentor's methods, Daniel gets upset and threatens to leave, but Miyagi shows him that the chores were training Daniel to block attacks through muscle memory. One night, Daniel finds Miyagi drunkenly lamenting the death of his wife and newborn son during childbirth at Manzanar while he was serving in Europe during World War II. Miyagi accompanies Daniel to the All-Valley tournament in December, where Daniel goes on to win in the finals.

=== The Karate Kid Part II (1986) ===
After the All-Valley tournament, Mr. Miyagi tells Daniel it is time to meet his mother and Ali for dinner. They are distracted by Kreese attacking Johnny Lawrence after he stood up to him, and Miyagi asks him to end the fight. Kreese refuses and turns his anger towards Miyagi, who "honks" his nose and subdues him. Daniel's senior prom ends in disaster, and in the beginning of summer 1985, Miyagi invites him to stay with him. A letter arrives informing Miyagi that his father, who lives in Okinawa, is dying. Mr. Miyagi makes plans to visit, and Daniel decides to join him. Miyagi recounts his unfortunate history with Sato and Yukie. Upon arriving, they are greeted by Sato's nephew Chozen, who drives Miyagi and Daniel to Sato. Sato tells Miyagi that they will fight to the death to restore Sato's honor. At the village, Miyagi and Daniel are welcomed by Yukie and her niece, Kumiko. They explain that Sato owns the village's land title and the villagers are forced to rent their property from him. Yukie reveals that she never married because of her love for Miyagi. Miyagi's father requests an audience with both Sato and Miyagi and before dying, requests that they put aside their differences. Sato gives Miyagi three days to mourn before their fight. Miyagi shows Daniel the secret to his family's karate: a handheld drum that twists back and forth, illustrating a block-and-defense karate move called the "drum technique". After Chozen and his crew vandalize Miyagi's family property and attack Daniel, Miyagi decides to return to California. Sato shows up with bulldozers, threatening to destroy the village if Miyagi flees again. Miyagi gives in on the condition that Sato signs the land title over to the villagers and Sato agrees. On the day before their fight, a typhoon strikes the village, leaving Sato trapped under the ruins of a dojo. Miyagi rescues Sato and they hide in a nearby pillbox with Chozen and other villagers. Daniel rushes into the storm after seeing Yuna stuck on top of a bell tower; Sato demands that his nephew help Daniel, but Chozen refuses. Sato assists Daniel himself, after which he disowns Chozen, who runs out into the storm. The next morning, the bulldozers return to help rebuild the village while Sato hands over the village's land title and asks forgiveness from Miyagi. Chozen takes Kumiko hostage and challenges Daniel to a fight to the death. Miyagi and others in the festival use handheld drums to motivate Daniel, inspiring him to subdue Chozen and they celebrate their victory.

=== The Karate Kid Part III (1989) ===
Miyagi and Daniel return to California in the summer of 1985 and discover that the South Seas apartment complex has been sold and is being slated for development, leaving Daniel homeless and Miyagi unemployed. Miyagi offers Daniel the choice to stay at his house. Daniel uses his college funding to help Miyagi open up a nursery shop for bonsai trees. John Kreese is attempting to resurrect Cobra Kai and get revenge on Daniel and Miyagi with the help of his friend Terry Silver, who hires Mike Barnes, a vicious karate expert. Daniel chooses not to defend his title in the next competition but continues his training under Miyagi. Silver claims that Kreese has died and requests forgiveness for his behavior. Barnes attempts to goad Daniel into entering the tournament by picking a fight with him. Daniel and Miyagi later find that their bonsai trees have been stolen and replaced with an application for the tournament. Daniel and his new neighbor, Jessica Andrews, decide to sell a valuable bonsai tree that Miyagi had brought back from Okinawa. Barnes returns while Daniel and Jessica ascend uphill, holding them hostage until Daniel agrees to compete in the tournament. Barnes then snaps the tree in half. Daniel takes the broken bonsai tree to Miyagi. He performs triage on the bonsai while confessing that he sold his truck to obtain a new stock of trees and that he cannot train Daniel for the tournament. Daniel accepts training under Silver's brutal conditions and ends up attacking a man at a nightclub by punching him and breaking his nose, after Silver bribed the man into instigating a fight with Daniel. Horrified at seeing what he has become, Daniel apologizes to Miyagi and Jessica. When Daniel decides not to compete after all, Silver unveils his true agenda: Barnes and Kreese appear and attack Daniel. Miyagi intervenes and defends Daniel, agreeing to train him once more. The two repair their friendship and replant the now-healed bonsai tree. At the tournament, Daniel defeats Barnes and shares a hug with Miyagi to celebrate his second tournament victory, while Silver and Kreese speculate that Cobra Kai is finished for good.

=== The Next Karate Kid (1994) ===
Miyagi travels to Arlington National Cemetery for a commendation for Japanese-Americans who fought in the 442nd Regimental Combat Team during World War II. While there he also meets Louisa Pierce, the widow of his commanding officer Jack Pierce, and they both listen to the opening speech given by Senator Daniel Inouye. When Louisa brings Miyagi to her home in Boston, he meets her granddaughter Julie Pierce. Julie has behavioral and anger problems stemming from both the loss of her parents in an automobile accident and frequent bullying at school by a school security fraternity called the Alpha Elite. Miyagi invites Louisa to stay in his house in Los Angeles to relax, and he himself stays in Boston to act as Julie's caretaker. Julie's issues cause friction at school and with Miyagi; he watches as she attempts to leave and narrowly misses being struck by a car by managing to jump into a tiger crouch onto the hood. Julie explains that she learned rudimentary karate from her father, Jack's son; Jack had taught his son what he learned from Miyagi. After Julie is arrested during a two-week suspension from school, Miyagi uses the remainder of the time to take Julie to a Buddhist monastery. There, he teaches Julie the true ways of karate – balance, coordination, awareness, and respect for all life – and helps her overcome her anger issues. As Julie is preparing for her high school prom, Miyagi teaches her to dance and buys her a dress. While Julie attends the prom, Miyagi goes bowling with the Buddhist monks. Things go awry when Julie and her date, Eric McGowen, come under siege by Colonel Dugan and the Alpha Elite. Eric's car is set on fire and Eric is saved by Julie and Miyagi. Miyagi challenges Colonel Dugan to a fight and easily defeats him.

=== Cobra Kai (2018–2025) ===
Although he does not physically appear in Cobra Kai, due to Morita's death in 2005, Mr. Miyagi is frequently referenced, or appears in archival footage, such as newspaper clippings. He is revealed to have died on November 15, 2011 aged 86. Daniel is inspired to open Miyagi-Do in honor of his mentor and attempts to continue his teachings. He also regularly visits Mr. Miyagi's grave. The fifth episode of the first season pays tribute to Morita by showing Daniel reconnecting with his mentor.

In Part 1 of Cobra Kai season 6, Daniel, Chozen, and Amanda learn that Mr. Miyagi had a secret past when they find a hidden box in his house. The objects in the box indicate that he was a boxer and a silent partner in a boxing gym. Amanda discovers a news clipping dated May 3, 1947, that details the beating and assault of Jim Watkins, who was from Lodi. In the article, Watkins accused Keisuke Miyagi of attacking him and stealing a valuable necklace. Daniel also discovers a bloodied headband from the Sekai Taikai. In Part 2 of Cobra Kai season 6, Terry Silver provides Daniel a Sekai Taikai record which reveals Miyagi's fight in the competition against "Claramunt" ended in death. The results are authenticated by the current Sekai Taikai officials. Mr. Miyagi returns to the screen in a flashback in the episode "Eunjangdo", recreated using artificial intelligence in the likeness of Morita. The younger version of the character is played by Brian Takahashi.

In Part 3, Daniel has a dream of Mr. Miyagi and himself fighting off the same masked bullies from the original film, after which Mr. Miyagi reminds his pupil that Daniel had always been taught that winning or losing isn't why Daniel fought. In the final episode, Daniel's mother, Lucille, reveals the real story behind Mr. Miyagi's secret. The man who Miyagi was accused of attacking actually attacked him after Miyagi confronted him for stealing a pearl necklace that had belonged first to Miyagi's mother and then his wife and was stolen following Mrs. Miyagi's death at Manzanar. Sometime before his death, Miyagi gave the necklace to Lucille to hold onto for Sam when the time was right. Lucille gives the necklace to Sam as a graduation gift before Sam departs for Okinawa to visit her surrogate grandfather's ancestral home. Daniel later has a flashback of Mr. Miyagi teaching him to catch a fly with chopsticks during one of their first lessons. Daniel tries to replicate the feat, only to have Johnny kill the fly first.

=== Karate Kid: Legends (2025) ===
Mr. Miyagi appears in archival footage from The Karate Kid Part II, which he tells then-adolescent Daniel LaRusso about the origins of karate and the relationship between the Miyagi and Han families when Mr. Miyagi's ancestor, Shimpo Miyagi, washed ashore while fishing in China, where the Han family gave him refuge and taught him the ancient art of kung fu, which he branded as karate upon his return to Okinawa with his Chinese wife and their children.

Decades later, Mr. Han, Mr. Miyagi's friend from China who is a Kung fu instructor, visits his house (now a dojo) in Los Angeles only to find out about his death and looking for Mr. Miyagi's protege and now-adult Daniel LaRusso, who is now a karate sensei himself, to teach Mr. Han's student and great-nephew Li Fong the ways of Miyagi-do karate to compete in the Five Boroughs Tournament in New York City, where Li has just moved to with his mother from China. Initially hesitant, Daniel agrees and goes to New York. Before Li reaches the final matches in the Five Boroughs Tournament, Daniel gives him a headband with an image of a tree once belonged to Mr. Miyagi.

== In other media ==
In 1989, Mr. Miyagi appeared alongside Daniel LaRusso in The Karate Kid animated television series, voiced by Robert Ito. The plot recounts their adventures around the world with a character named Taki. This incarnation was inexplicably given the name Yakuga. In 2004, Mr. Miyagi appeared alongside Daniel in a musical produced for Broadway titled It’s Karate, Kid! The Musical. In 2026, Mr Miyagi appeared in a version titled The Karate Kid The Musical, that toured in the UK and Canada, played by Adrian Pang.

== Reception and legacy ==
Morita gained fame in the 1980s for his role as Mr. Miyagi. In 2015, Mr. Miyagi was inducted into the Fictitious Athlete Hall of Fame in the Contributor Category. Julian Roman of MovieWeb described Mr. Miyagi as an enduring symbol of "strength, friendship and teaching".

For his role in The Karate Kid Morita was nominated for an Academy Award for Best Supporting Actor at the 57th Academy Awards ceremony and a corresponding Golden Globe Award for Best Performance by an Actor in a Supporting Role in any Motion Picture.

Although Morita died in 2005, Macchio wrote in an imaginary 2022 letter to him that due to the Cobra Kai series, the "legacy of your work and contribution to the world in your portrayal of Mr. Miyagi shines brighter than ever." Macchio also described Cobra Kai through the concept of the Miyagi-verse, which comprises "anyone who knew Mr. Miyagi".
