= Mike Barnes (Karate Kid) =

Fictional character from The Karate Kid franchise

- The Karate Kid character
- Mike Barnes as he appears in The Karate Kid Part III
- First appearance: The Karate Kid Part III (1989)
- Last appearance: "Underdogs" (Cobra Kai, season 6) (2024)
- Created by: Robert Mark Kamen
- Portrayed by: Sean Kanan

In-universe information
- Full name: Michael Barnes
- Nicknames: Karate's Bad Boy; Mike
- Gender: Male
- Occupation: Furnishing owner; Karate competitor (formerly)
- Affiliation: Agoura Fine Furshinings; Cobra Kai Dojo (1985; formerly)
- Fighting style: Tang Soo Do, Shotokan Karate
- Family: Unnamed father-in-law
- Spouse: Unnamed wife
- Nationality: American

Mike Barnes is a fictional character in the Karate Kid film franchise, serving as the main antagonist (alongside Terry Silver) of the film The Karate Kid Part III (1989), and also in a supporting role of the fifth and sixth seasons of the sequel television series Cobra Kai. He is portrayed by Sean Kanan.

== Overview ==
Mike Barnes was a national karate champion who had achieved a number of wins during the 1980s, and as such was dubbed "Karate's Bad Boy" because of his vicious nature. In 1985, Terry Silver, who is looking to assist his friend and comrade John Kreese in restoring the Cobra Kai dojo, hires Barnes as part of his plan. He flies him to his mansion and offers him a part of Cobra Kai if he defeats Daniel LaRusso (which Mike Barnes bullied) in the next All Valley Under-18 Karate Championships. As part of their deal, Barnes harasses Daniel and his mentor, Mr. Miyagi to get them to participate. Consequently, after Barnes loses, his unethical conduct results in him being barred from participating in karate for life, ruining his financial future. He thus became lost and worked odd jobs for some time, eventually working at a furniture store. While moving furniture, his boss took him under his wing. Barnes learned that he could use his hands to make things rather than fight, finding a renewed purpose. He eventually married the owner's daughter and took over the furniture store after he died.

== Young Mike Barnes ==
Silver hires karate fighter Mike Barnes to defeat Daniel in the next All Valley Under-18 Karate Championships in order to save Cobra Kai (which Kreese wants to close after all of his students have left due to his attack against his star student Johnny Lawrence). Silver offers him 25% (later 50%) ownership of the new Cobra Kai dojos via a contract if he achieves the goal. When Silver finds out that Daniel LaRusso will not fight at the tournament this year, he orders Barnes and his two thugs, Snake and Dennis, to terrorize him in order to make him sign up for the tournament. They later succeed by threatening to leave Daniel and his friend, Jessica Andrews, to drown at the bottom of a cliff. Barnes also breaks Mr. Miyagi's valuable bonsai tree.

When Daniel decides not to compete at the tournament, Silver reveals that he was the one who is behind Barnes and that his agenda was avenging John Kreese, who was his best friend all along. Barnes viciously assaults Daniel until Mr. Miyagi arrives and defeats the three men. Daniel and Miyagi decide to show up for the tournament. At the tournament, Barnes reaches the final round to face Daniel. Silver and Kreese instruct Barnes to inflict pain on Daniel and then beat him in the sudden death round. Barnes wins and loses points on Daniel (nearly getting disqualified in the process), but gets defeated in the sudden death round. After the final point is scored, Silver walks away in disgust as Cobra Kai shirts are discarded around him.

Because of his unsportsmanlike behavior, Barnes and the entirety of the Cobra Kai dojo are banned from participating in the All-Valley tournament.

== Adult Mike Barnes ==
=== Season 1 ===
==== Episode 7 ====
Barnes is referenced in the Cobra Kai episode "All Valley", where Johnny is informed about the ban. As he never met Terry Silver or Mike Barnes, Johnny succeeds at getting the ban overturned when he states that he does not know who they are, to Daniel's chagrin.

=== Season 2 ===
==== Episode 6 ====
Barnes is indirectly referenced when Daniel tells his students a brief synopsis of his time reluctantly training with Silver due to Mike Barnes forcing him to compete in the 1985 All-Valley Tournament to defend his championship title (from The Karate Kid Part III).

=== Season 3 ===
Barnes is also seen in archival footage, when Daniel tells his daughter Samantha about his match with Barnes when addressing Samantha's personal fear of Tory.

=== Season 4 ===
After Silver returns to the Cobra Kai dojo with Kreese, Daniel shares with Johnny the torment that Silver inflicted on him as a teenager. During the conversation, he mentions his victory over Barnes in the 1985 All-Valley Tournament. As Daniel equally opens up to Amanda, she jokingly asks if there are any other Cobra Kai students from his past that they should be worried about coming back. Daniel emphatically replies "No", and then corrects himself, saying that he "can't say for sure", referring to Barnes. The 1985 All-Valley Tournament sudden death match between Daniel and Barnes is referenced when the boys final match between Hawk and Robby goes to a sudden death overtime. The announcer says that this is the first time that the sudden death even has happened since 1985.

=== Season 5 ===
==== Episode 3 ====
Thirty-four years after the 1985 All-Valley Tournament, when Daniel and Chozen learn that Silver is recruiting more senseis for his dojos, Daniel believes that he may be seeking out Mike, so they attempt to seek him out first and track him down to a furniture store. However, they find him to be a changed man. At first, only Daniel comes to see Mike, and after an initial misunderstanding, Mike reveals that he is a different person. He tells Daniel that after the events of Karate Kid Part III he was banned from participating in karate and his financial future was in ruins. He began to work odd jobs, eventually meeting his future father-in-law while moving furniture. His father-in-law took him under his wing, and Mike learned that he could use his hands to make furniture rather than fight. He liked the idea of doing something like making furniture that brought people together. Daniel learns that he and his wife run the furniture store. Mike shows disdain over hearing about Silver's Cobra Kai expansion, and reveals he hadn't seen him in years, as he had cut ties with him due to his resentment towards Kreese and Silver for Cobra Kai's loss during the 1985 All-Valley Tournament. Mike begins to joke around about a re-match with Daniel, which Chozen misunderstands and attacks Mike. After a prolonged fight, Daniel managed to clarify to Chozen that Mike was now on their side, and apologizes to Mike.

The three of them then talk about Silver. Daniel asks Mike if he can think of any information on Silver that might be of use. Mike tells Daniel about the contract that Silver had him sign, which Daniel believes is evidence of illegal behavior. Mike thus gives him the phone number of the attorney involved with the contract. Daniel leaves a voicemail for the attorney, saying that he is calling in regard to Terry Silver.

The next day, while Daniel is in the sauna at the country club, Silver enters and plays the message that Daniel left for the lawyer. He then tells Daniel that first he is going to deal with Mike Barnes, and then he will deal with Daniel. Later, Mike is in the parking lot of his store and is horrified when he is watching it burn down in flames.

==== Episode 4 ====
Chozen tells Daniel that he hopes Mike will now help them fight Terry. Daniel says that he isn't sure that Mike knows it was Terry who burned down the store, and that Mike has gone out of town while the insurance company is investigating.

==== Episode 10 ====
On the night that Johnny, Chozen, and Daniel are celebrating and using a limo, Mike hijacks the limo and drives them all to a rural area. When the limo stops, Mike opens the door and pulls Daniel outside to attempt to beat him up, furiously berating Daniel and saying that Daniel ruined his life as the furniture store was leveraged and his wife left him. Chozen and Johnny jump out to help Daniel. Daniel eventually calms Mike down and tells him that it was Silver who burned down his store. Mike then furiously proposes they exact vengeance on Silver once and for all, which Johnny and Chozen agree to do, while leaving Daniel stranded in the middle of nowhere.

Daniel's three former rivals then trespass into Silver's mansion and confront him and Kim Da-Eun. Mike holds his own against one of Silver's senseis, but is knocked out from behind quickly. He eventually wakes up to save Johnny at the last second. In the aftermath, he steals the Rembrandt painting The Storm on the Sea of Galilee from Silver's home to pay for his lost store. Arriving at Cobra Kai's main headquarters just as Terry Silver had been defeated, he and Johnny help an injured Chozen get into an ambulance so he can recover from the injuries he sustained in his fight with Silver.

=== Season 6 ===
==== Episode 4 ====
After it's revealed that only six fighters per dojo are allowed at the Sekai Taikai, Johnny and Daniel invite Mike to judge the students fairly, worried their own biases would get in the way. Barnes puts the dojo through excruciating tests, ultimately selecting Miguel, Robby, Sam, Tory, Hawk, Demetri, Devon, Kenny, Mitch, Chris, Nate, and Anthony to compete in a Battle Royale, during which Johnny attempts to sway Mike into making Devon join the team. Miguel, Robby, Sam, and Tory advance, while Barnes reviews his notes for the other competitors. Johnny goes to Mike later that night at his furniture workshop to convince him to give Devon a fair shake, but Mike goads Johnny instead into fighting him. Johnny defeats Mike, who explains his desire for a fight has been revoked by his recent experiences with Silver and Daniel, and who promises to give Devon a fair shake. The next day, Mike claims that Kenny, Devon, Hawk, and Demetri all tied, and forces them to compete to find 2 flags hidden in the woods first: the two who find them join the Sekai Taikai team. Devon (having put laxatives in Kenny's water) and Demetri ultimately win. Mike congratulates Samantha, Miguel, Robby, Tory, Devon, and Demetri for making it into the Sekai Taikai, bows to Daniel, shakes hands with Johnny, wishes them good luck and departs.

==== Episode 14 ====
In the penultimate episode of the series, it is mentioned that Silver's henchman Dennis De Guzman burned down Mike's furniture store during Silver's plot to have Johnny's wife Carmen and their baby Laura Lawrence-Diaz kidnapped by Dennis in order to prevent Johnny from defeating Sensei Wolf and the Iron Dragons during the final match between Johnny and Sensei Wolf.

== Commentary ==
Sean Kanan studied karate with a school "affiliated with the Japanese Karate Federation" while growing up. He transferred to UCLA after beginning college at Boston University, and studied acting at the same time. It was during this time that Pat Morita's stunt double Fumio Demura encouraged him to join the open call for the role of Mike Barnes in The Karate Kid Part III. He caught John G. Avildsen's attention through his ability to intimidate, but ultimately was not initially cast in the role. A week later, however, he learned that the producers had changed their mind and that he won the part.

In December 1988, Kanan suffered a life-threatening injury during filming. After performing a stunt, he treated the consequent pain with aspirin and spent the holidays in Las Vegas. However, he became so ill that he went to the hospital on Christmas Day and had emergency surgery to stop internal bleeding caused by the use of aspirins. Against medical advice, he signed himself out early and went back to the set to complete the film.

When Kanan was asked to return to the role of Mike Barnes for Cobra Kai, he was "really blown away" by the decision of the creators to ask for his input. He told them that the "only thing that I would respectfully request is that I don't think it's that interesting to play the character as this unidimensional bad guy that he was in the original film. I'm 35 years down the road both as a man and as an actor, and I feel like there's a lot of different facets we could bring that would hopefully fill in what's happened to him over this period of time". In addition, he mentioned that as he is a stand-up comic, he would "like to infuse this with humor. I think there are moments where Mike Barnes is funny, especially in the finale. I also hoped there can be some multi-dimensionality in the form of redemption and regret for past behavior. The guys are fantastic and I'm so humbled and blessed they finally called on me to come play".

Kanan enjoyed reuniting with original cast members: "Yuji [Okumoto, who plays Chozen] and Billy and I have seen each other much more over the years. So I've got a really nice relationship with them. Ralph, I've only seen a couple times, but it's really been nice forming a brand new friendship with him all these years later as a 55-year-old married guy with kids. I'm a very different guy than I was when I was a brash 22-year-old hired to basically terrorize him. We were just standing around in between takes, and just looked at each other, and he was like, "Can you believe this? Is this nuts?" I love the fact that as successful he and Billy are, they are not blasé or jaded about it. They have a real appreciation for what a wonderful gift this is and the fact that it's just a tad surreal".
