= Jessica Andrews (character) =

Fictional character from The Karate Kid franchise

- 'The Karate Kid' character
- Jessica Andrews as she appears in The Karate Kid Part III
- First appearance: The Karate Kid Part III (1989)
- Last appearance: "Extreme Measures" (Cobra Kai, season 5 (2022)
- Created by: Robert Mark Kamen
- Portrayed by: Robyn Lively

In-universe information
- Gender: Female
- Occupation: Pottery; Rock climbing (hobby)
- Family: Two unnamed daughters Amanda LaRusso née Steiner (cousin); Daniel LaRusso (cousin-in-law); Joanne (aunt); Pat (aunt)
- Nationality: American

Jessica Andrews is a fictional character portrayed by Robyn Lively in the film The Karate Kid Part III (1989), and in the fifth season of its sequel series Cobra Kai (2022).

== Overview ==
In 1985, Jessica Andrews, who is originally from Columbus, Ohio, worked in her Aunt Pat's pottery shop in Los Angeles (while living in an apartment above the shop). After two months, Jessica met Daniel LaRusso (as Mr. Miyagi's Bonsai shop was across the street), and as she had recently broken up with her boyfriend, they planned to go out on a date. Later that day, Jessica told Daniel that she and her boyfriend when she went back to Ohio, so Jessica and Daniel decided to just be friends.

After a number of adventures with Daniel (that involved Terry Silver and Mike Barnes), Jessica returned to Columbus, and remained in contact with Daniel. Sometime prior to 2002, she introduced Daniel to her cousin, Amanda Steiner, who was moving out to Los Angeles, and Amanda and Daniel eventually married. Jessica currently lives in Columbus, and enjoys rock climbing with her two daughters.

== Young Jessica Andrews ==
In 1985, Daniel LaRusso visits a pottery shop after Mr. Miyagi sends him there. He meets a young girl working on a pottery wheel, and explains to her that he has just opened a Bonsai tree shop across the street with his partner, and is in need of pots. Daniel then learns that her name is Jessica Andrews, and after seeing a picture of her rock-climbing with a man whose face is missing from the photo, also discovers that she has recently broken up with her boyfriend (as he had started dating her high school rival, Elizabeth Anne Rooney, whom she later describes to Daniel as "the traitor"). As Daniel is leaving after ordering the pots, they decide to go on a date that evening (and Daniel also discovers when he returns to the Bonsai store that Mr. Miyagi intentionally sent him to meet Jessica).

That evening, when Daniel comes to pick up Jessica, he learns that she and her boyfriend are getting back together, and that Jessica is going to return home to Columbus after Thanksgiving. They decided to "go Dutch" instead and to be friends. Daniel also introduces Jessica to Mr. Miyagi, who is leaving the shop as they enter. They then get into a conversation about Karate, which is then interrupted as Mike Barnes and Snake barge into the shop. They harass and attempt to intimidate Daniel into signing the application for the All-Valley (which Daniel had declined to enter). When Barnes comes on to Jessica, she calls him a "slime-ball" and appears ready to fight him as well, but is stopped by Daniel.

The following evening, Jessica visits the Bonsai shop with macaroni and cheese, which turns out to be one of Daniel's favorite foods. She also gives him the pot he had ordered, and Daniel reciprocates with tickets to a dance club for the night before she leaves as a going away present. They are then interrupted by Mike Barnes, Snake, and Dennis, who begin to attack the shop when they discover that Daniel has still not signed the form. When Daniel goes to confront Dennis, Jessica attempts to intervene, but is pushed away from the fight by Barnes, telling her to "stay there". When Snake rushes to help Dennis, Jessica punches him in the stomach, but is then kicked away by Barnes, who begins to fight with Daniel. Eventually, Mr. Miyagi appears and ends the fight. When Daniel asks how Jessica is, she appears relatively fine, but wants to take a rest.

Later, Daniel and Mr. Miyagi realize that all of their Bonsai trees have been stolen. Resolved to replace them, Daniel decides to climb down the mountain where Mr. Miyagi has planted a valuable Bonsai tree that Mr. Miyagi brought from Okinawa and retrieve it (in order to sell it). Daniel tells Jessica what happened, and how the police did not take it seriously, so he had no choice but to get this tree. An experienced rock climber, Jessica works with Daniel to retrieve the tree, though she has reservations about the fact that he did not tell Mr. Miyagi. However, Daniel is convinced it is the only way to save the business. Using a set of binoculars, Daniel locates the position of the tree, and Jessica teaches him how to climb down the mountain. In the process of dislodging the tree, it falls to the water below and they both hurry to retrieve it (despite the fact that the tide is coming in). As Daniel and Jessica are putting the tree into a bag, they see Mike Barnes, Snake, and Dennis pulling the ropes back up the mountain. Trapped by the situation, Daniel has no choice but to sign the application, in exchange for the ropes being let back down. Barnes, Snake, and Dennis ultimately pull them both up the mountain, although in the process, Barnes breaks the tree in two.

The next day, Daniel and Jessica go for a run in the park, where Daniel tells her that Mr. Miyagi is still refusing to train him. Jessica is also serving as Daniel's coach, telling him not to stop as he pauses for a drink of water. Terry Silver appears near the water fountain in a truck convertible and re-introduces himself to Daniel (who had met him the day before). Daniel then introduces Silver to Jessica. Silver is friendly to Daniel, appearing to offer helpful advice and a book. As Silver is leaving, he says: "Nice to meet you, Jessica Andrews. Take care of our champion". Jessica then tells Daniel: "That was a nice offer about the book". She then pulls him back into their workout, telling Daniel that he has got "to get some muscle".

After Silver drops by Mr. Miyagi's dojo to give Daniel the book (and seemingly protect him from Mike Barnes), Daniel returns to the Bonsai shop and is greeted by Mr. Miyagi and Jessica (who has made a few more pots for them, which she had stayed up all night to make). Following up on what seemed like a karate suggestion from Silver (which he assures Daniel is the key to success in a tournament), he asks Mr. Miyagi, "Do you know how to sweep?" Mr. Miyagi returns with a broom and Jessica laughs. Infuriated, Daniel drives off in a rage as Jessica and Mr. Miyagi watch, and goes to join Cobra Kai in order to work with Silver.

On her last night in town, Jessica and Daniel go dancing at the club he told her about earlier. As they enter the club, Daniel excitedly tells her about Silver, his new teacher, the guy she met when they were jogging. When he praises Silver, Jessica reminds Daniel that he had said the same thing about Mr. Miyagi. As they are dancing, Silver appears (though hidden by a beam), and finds a random man in the room whom he bribes to hit on Jessica.

Silver greets Daniel who is surprised to see him, although Silver reminds Daniel that he told him about the plans to go to the club. In what seems to be a coincidence, the random man appears and grabs Jessica by the arm saying, "Hold up, sexy lady...I've been watching you and you are hot". As Terry watches, Daniel immediately jumps to her defense, saying that Jessica is with him. When the man asks, "Says who?" Jessica furiously responds, "Says me, come on," and grabs Daniel to leave. However, the man grabs Daniel and taunts that he is taking Jessica home, to which Daniel angrily punches him in the nose. Jessica is horrified by this, asking Daniel: "What are you doing? What is wrong with you? What are you, nuts?", as she storms off. Daniel is then pulled away by Terry Silver, who tells him repeatedly that he did the right thing.

Filled with remorse, Daniel goes to Jessica's apartment (where she is packing to go home). Although still angry, she lets him in. Daniel apologizes for his behavior, and tells Jessica that he plans to apologize to the man he hurt. Daniel also admits that he "didn't want you leaving thinking that was me". When Jessica asked who it was then, Daniel confides in her that he has "been trying to be someone I'm not and it's not working. I feel like I'm losing control of everything". Daniel does not know what to do now.

As Jessica begins to understand that Silver has been manipulating Daniel, she sits next to Daniel and assures him that just because she is angry does not mean that their friendship is over. She also reassures Daniel that Mr. Miyagi told her how much Daniel means to him, and that he has faith in Daniel. She convinces Daniel to go to Mr. Miyagi and tell him the truth. As Daniel is leaving, he tells Jessica that he will miss her, to which Jessica says, "Send me a Christmas card, okay?" Daniel replies, "You got a deal."

== Adult Jessica Andrews ==
=== Season 5, Episode 5 ===
In 2019, after having a falling out with Daniel over her inability to understand that he is telling her the truth about Terry Silver being a psychopath, Amanda takes Sam and Anthony to visit her mother, Joanne, in Ohio for a while. One evening while Amanda is playing cards with her mother, Jessica arrives to take her and the kids out to dinner. She brings macaroni and cheese for Daniel, but learns from Sam that he did not join them on this visit, much to Jessica's disappointment.

They go to a bar from Jessica and Amanda's youth, where the cousins catch up. Jessica tells Amanda that she has just finished rock climbing in the Gorge with her daughters. However, Jessica does not want to talk about herself but wants to understand why Daniel is absent. At that moment, their old rival, Elizabeth Anne Rooney, begins to harass Jessica and Amanda, until Jessica politely gets her to back off.

Amanda then tells Jessica that her problems with Daniel revolve around karate, and enemies from Daniel's past who keep showing up. When she mentions that the latest one is Terry Silver, Jessica is horrified about it. Amanda is shocked and wonders how Jessica knows who Silver is. Jessica then admits that when she first met Daniel, he was going through some things because of Silver. Amanda is surprised that Jessica did not tell her about all of this before. Jessica defends that she "never thought that he would come back around" and that Daniel was past that when Amanda was moving to Los Angeles and Jessica put Amanda in touch with Daniel. Jessica then tells Amanda about their experiences with Silver back in 1985, recalling that he pretended to be Daniel's friend and then his mentor while having Barnes, Snake, and Dennis harass him, Jessica, and Mr. Miyagi to drive a wedge between Daniel and Mr. Miyagi, which succeeded for some time. Ashamed, Amanda realizes that Daniel was telling her the truth. Jessica assures Amanda that he can still get through this.

Lizzie-Anne then bullies Jessica and Amanda again over the latter's delinquent youth, causing the cousins to get into a brief physical fight with the bullies. However, Sam quickly ends the fight by kicking Lizzie-Anne away from her mother, and they flee the bar.

Back at Joanne's house, Jessica admires Sam's karate skills, as well as her protective instincts (traits which, according to Jessica, come from both Daniel and Amanda). Jessica then jokes how she and Amanda got into a bar fight over nothing, but then tells Amanda that Daniel has every reason to hate Silver for everything the latter did to him, as Jessica even admits she herself still has nightmares from those events. Jessica then advises Amanda to cut Daniel some slack, leading Amanda to return home to help him.

== Commentary ==
Robyn Lively learned of her involvement with Cobra Kai when she received a phone call from the creators. The decision to make Jessica and Amanda LaRusso cousins developed due to a trend that the creators have observed: "One thing that we've noticed in the Cobra Kai fandom is everyone's always saying so-and-so is related to so-and-so...and more often than not we find that kind of thing cheesy. It wouldn't feel grounded". However, Jon Hurwitz notes that the return of Terry Silver offered a perfect opportunity to make this kind of connection: "It gets to the point where Terry has sort of driven [Daniel] crazy enough to make him look like a crazy person in front of Amanda.... "Amanda is just like, 'I need a break from this' and leaves town. And we thought, 'What better character to give Amanda some perspective on what Daniel actually went through back in the day than the woman who was there with Daniel?'" Lively concurred, citing the choice as "a full circle moment and so satisfying". Hurwitz also references Jessica's critical role as matchmaker: "[Amanda] moved out to LA and didn't know anybody. And Jessica's like, 'Hey, there's this nice guy that I know...she's just like, 'Hey, I'm gonna introduce Amanda, my cousin, Amanda, to this really nice guy'. And the rest is history... She has this great energy about her that is very similar to Courtney Henggeler's energy. So to bring those two actresses together, it felt like they were sisters, it felt like they were cousins. It just felt right".

Lively also enjoyed reuniting with her co-stars, stating that there was "ton of screaming and dancing and lots of just joy...I hadn't seen Ralph since I was in my early twenties. And Billy — we've been friends for more years than I can count. It was just an absolute epic reunion". Although Lively has always viewed her early work on The Karate Kid III as "an absolute career highlight", she acknowledges the "frustration" on the set as they "didn't have a complete script. There were a lot of changes coming at us daily, and those are difficult circumstances to work under". However, she liked working with Macchio whom she describes as "professional and kind and warm and lovely to work with". Lively also notes that although her character was originally written as "a love interest", the relationship was eventually rewritten as a platonic one, which Lively suspects was due to the significant difference in their ages. She also recalls that Pat Morita was "funny, charming and delightful. I went to junior high with his daughter, which I didn't even realize until he was like, 'You go to school with my daughter.' [Laughs] I didn't have a lot of screen time with him or spend much time with him, but the little time that I did get to spend was absolutely wonderful".
