= Cobra Kai season 6 =

Season of television series

Cobra Kai
- Season 6
- Promotional poster for Part 3
- Starring: Ralph Macchio; William Zabka; Courtney Henggeler; Xolo Maridueña; Tanner Buchanan; Mary Mouser; Peyton List; Jacob Bertrand; Gianni DeCenzo; Dallas Dupree Young; Vanessa Rubio; Martin Kove; Thomas Ian Griffith
- No. of episodes: 15

Release
- Original network: Netflix
- Original release: July 18, 2024 – February 13, 2025

Season chronology
- ← Previous; Season 5

The sixth season of Cobra Kai, also known as Cobra Kai VI, consists of 15 episodes and was released on Netflix.

Unlike previous seasons, the sixth season was released in three parts of five episodes each. The first part was released on July 18, 2024, and focuses on Daniel, Johnny, and Chozen training their students for the Sekai Taikai following the demise of Cobra Kai. The second part was released on November 15, 2024, and focuses on Miyagi-Do struggling to compete in the tournament in Barcelona against both a revived Cobra Kai and the Iron Dragons, led by Terry Silver. The third and final part was released on February 13, 2025, and focuses on Johnny and Daniel training to win the tournament back in California and defeat Silver once and for all. It is a conclusion to the story of the Karate Kid franchise up to that point, ending several main characters' story arcs.

The sixth season was originally set to be released in 2023, but experienced delays as a result of the 2023 Hollywood labor disputes. The second part, however, got an early release date after originally receiving a November 28, 2024 release window. The season features 13 starring roles, all of which returned from previous seasons, including Gianni DeCenzo, who was a series regular in seasons 2–4, but was demoted to a recurring cast member in the previous season. Although the first two parts received mixed reviews from critics, the third part was met more positively, and was deemed a satisfying conclusion to the series.

== Cast and characters ==
=== Main ===
- Ralph Macchio as Daniel LaRusso
- William Zabka as Johnny Lawrence
- Courtney Henggeler as Amanda LaRusso
- Xolo Maridueña as Miguel Diaz
- Tanner Buchanan as Robby Keene
- Mary Mouser as Samantha LaRusso
- Peyton List as Tory Nichols
- Jacob Bertrand as Eli "Hawk" Moskowitz
- Gianni DeCenzo as Demetri Alexopoulos
- Dallas Dupree Young as Kenny Payne
- Vanessa Rubio as Carmen Diaz
- Martin Kove as John Kreese
- Thomas Ian Griffith as Terry Silver

=== Recurring ===
- Yuji Okumoto as Chozen Toguchi
- Oona O'Brien as Devon Lee
- Griffin Santopietro as Anthony LaRusso
- Aedin Mincks as Mitch
- Khalil Everage as Chris
- Owen Morgan as Bert
- Nathaniel Oh as Nathaniel
- Rose Bianco as Rosa Diaz
- Alicia Hannah-Kim as Kim Da-Eun
- Brandon H. Lee as Kwon Jae-Sung
- Daniel Kim as Yoon Do-Jin
- Carsten Norgaard as Gunther Braun
- Lewis Tan as Feng Xiao/Sensei Wolf
- Patrick Luwis as Axel Kovačević
- Rayna Vallandingham as Zara Malik
- William Christopher Ford as Dennis de Guzman

=== Notable guests ===
- Paul Walter Hauser as Raymond "Stingray" Porter
- Okea Eme-Akwari as Shawn Payne
- Joe Seo as Kyler Park
- Bo Mitchell as Brucks
- Barrett Carnahan as young John Kreese
- Nick Marini as young Terry Silver
- C. S. Lee as Master Kim Sun-Yung
- Annalisa Cochrane as Yasmine
- Sean Kanan as Mike Barnes
- Bret Ernst as Louie LaRusso Jr.
- Dan Ahdoot as Anoush Norouzi
- Hannah Kepple as Moon Taylor
- Diora Baird as Shannon Keene
- Julia Macchio as Vanessa LaRusso
- Ron Thomas as Bobby Brown
- Elizabeth Berkley as Winnie Taylor
- Darryl Vidal as himself
- Randee Heller as Lucille LaRusso

== Episodes ==
Cobra Kai season 6 episodes
No. overall	No. in season	Title	Directed by	Written by	Original release date
Part 1
51	1	"Peacetime in the Valley"	Joel Novoa	Bob Dearden	July 18, 2024
Following the demise of Cobra Kai, the students of both Miyagi-Do and Eagle Fang prepare for the Sekai Taikai. After disagreements over their training styles, Johnny and Chozen challenge each other to a fight. Daniel learns that Chozen's pride was wounded when Terry Silver stabbed him in the back and Kumiko did not reply to his voice messages. Miguel tries to ease the tension between Tory and Sam while Robby attempts to make amends with Kenny, but he encounters Shawn, who tells him to leave Kenny alone. Robby and Miguel take on Shawn while Tory and Sam try to reason with Kenny into joining their dojo, but to no avail. After receiving a text message, Johnny goes to Coyote Creek, where Stingray tells him to retake the Cobra Kai brand with Kreese and Silver gone. The next morning, Johnny concedes and tells Daniel that Miyagi-Do has the right to represent the students in the Sekai Taikai, but he and Chozen still have their fight. After a talk with Shawn about how Silver's teachings are corrupting him, Kenny joins Miyagi-Do. Elsewhere, Kreese enters Kim Da-Eun's dojo, telling the students that Cobra Kai is back.
52	2	"The Prize"	Joel Novoa	Joe Piarulli & Luan Thomas	July 18, 2024
Kreese proposes to Master Kim Sun-Yung to have his dojo represent Cobra Kai in the Sekai Taikai, only to be turned down after Da-Eun's previous partnership with Silver ended in failure. Sun-Yung then agrees to the proposal if Kreese ventures to a remote island and recovers his ancient family knife, the eunjangdo, deep within a cave. Kreese finds the eunjangdo, but is bitten by an albino cobra, causing him to see hallucinations of Silver and Johnny. Meanwhile, Miguel discovers that Kyler is the subject of hazing by a fraternity that has no plans of letting him in. With the help of Miguel, Hawk, Demetri, and Brucks, Kyler takes down the fraternity at their party and gets accepted into another fraternity. After the Diaz apartment experiences a leaky ceiling due to clogged sewage pipes, Johnny gets a sales job at LaRusso Auto Group to save up for a new home. Upon conquering his inner demons and vanquishing his sole weakness, Kreese beheads the cobra and returns to Sun-Yung with the eunjangdo and the dead cobra's head, determined to not allow anyone to stop him from his goal - not even Johnny.
53	3	"Sleeper"	Ralph Macchio	Mattea Greene	July 18, 2024
Kreese takes control of the Kim dojo training, focusing on the delinquent Kwon Jae-Sung and molding him. That night, after some prodding by Kreese to use his anger for a purpose, Kwon defeats Yoon Do-Jin, the dojo's top student, in a fight and rips off the King Cobra badge as a personal souvenir, affirming his role as the leader. Back in America, Johnny and Carmen learn that Carmen is expecting a baby girl after the gender reveal explodes pink paint all over Daniel. At the Miyagi house, Daniel, Amanda, and Chozen discover a chest hidden under the floor. Upon opening the chest, they discover Mr. Miyagi co-owned a boxing gym and reportedly fled the country to China after he was wanted for assault and robbery in 1947. After noticing the friendship between Sam and Tory making them weak in their training, Johnny invites them to Devon's home for a slumber party. Despite Johnny's plan failing, Sam and Tory suddenly get into an argument before they apologize to each other for their wrongdoings. The next day, the Miyagi-Do dojo learns that the Sekai Taikai will be hosted in Barcelona, and that only six fighters will be allowed to represent each dojo.
54	4	"Underdogs"	Sherwin Shilati	Chris Rafferty	July 18, 2024
In order to determine the six fighters who will represent Miyagi-Do in the Sekai Taikai, Daniel and Johnny bring in Mike Barnes to make the selection process a level playing field. Hawk, Robby, Miguel, Sam, Tory, Mitch, Kenny, Nate, Chris, Demetri, Devon, and Anthony are chosen by Barnes for the second round of eliminations. The next day, the top 12 engage in a battle royale, where each student must rid another of their flags. Tory, Robby, Sam, and Miguel immediately advance. Anthony doubts himself after being eliminated when he receives a bloody nose from Kenny during the battle royale. Johnny confronts Barnes upon learning Devon did not make the cut. The next morning, Barnes has Hawk, Demetri, Kenny, and Devon run through the forest and capture two flags to determine the final lineup. Devon captures the first flag after Kenny suddenly experiences diarrhea while Demetri defeats Hawk to make the team. Kenny accuses Anthony of spiking his water with Mitch's laxative, when in reality it was Devon, while Daniel suspects Johnny had a part in getting Devon in the lineup.
55	5	"Best of the Best"	Sherwin Shilati	Michael Jonathan Smith	July 18, 2024
Tory encounters Kreese while returning from the Medical Center, who warns her not to trust Miyagi-Do. Daniel and Johnny decide to have Sam, Tory, Miguel, and Robby fight each other to secure their spots as team captains. Tory returns home, only to discover her mother has died due to an undetected blood clot. On the day of the contest, Robby defeats Miguel to become male captain when Tory's arrival helps him become more focused and make a comeback from Miguel scoring the first two points. During the girls' fight, Tory displays aggression and is about to score, equaling the score of 2-2 against Sam when Daniel intervenes before she reveals to everyone of her mother's death and leaves the team, forfeiting the female captain position to Sam. This incident causes an argument between Johnny and Daniel over how they should have handled the situation, ending with them furiously to never speak to each other again after the tournament when Daniel punches Johnny in retaliation for Johnny insulting Mr. Miyagi over the chest of secrets. Hawk is selected to take over Tory's spot on the team, with Demetri being slightly displeased at the turn of events. As Robby and Sam are given their captain headbands, Daniel suddenly recognizes a similar headband from Mr. Miyagi's chest and realizes his sensei fought in the Sekai Taikai too as a team captain and that his headband was actually bloodied at the ends, making Daniel question his beliefs. The Miyagi-Do team arrives in Barcelona for the tournament, where they encounter Kreese and Da-Eun's new Cobra Kai representing South Korea, led by Kwon and Tory, much to Robby's shock.
Part 2
56	6	"Benvinguts a Barcelona"	Joel Novoa	Joe Piarulli & Luan Thomas	November 15, 2024
The teams are welcomed in Barcelona, and they are sent off to enjoy the city on their first day before the competition starts the following day. Robby tries to talk to Tory about her decision to rejoin Cobra Kai but to no avail. Robby and Demetri lose their hotel rooms to Kwon after losing a bet and are forced to split rooms with Miguel and Hawk. The Miyagi-Dos get upset when they find out that Robby knew Kreese spoke to Tory before her mother died and didn't tell them. Tory asks Robby for a break; she feels it is for the best since they both need to focus on the competition. Daniel and Johnny try to get along with the other senseis and sponsors, but things get hard when Johnny almost gets into an argument with another guest, Wolf, who turns out to be the sensei of the Hong Kong dojo Iron Dragons. Chozen arrives drunk, disappointed after going to Japan to look for Kumiko, as he thinks she is romantically involved with another man; his behavior results in the three of them being thrown out. On the tournament's first day, all the teams participate in the "Captain's War" event, where four teams are placed on the mat at a time and must protect their captains, while attempting to eliminate the opposing teams' captains; Miyagi-Do faces Cobra Kai, Iron Dragons, and Falchi Della Notte. Robby gets distracted during the event, causing him to lose to Kwon, and Miyagi-Do loses the round. After eliminating Falchi Della Notte, Tory, Kwon, and Yoon face off against the other remaining team: the Iron Dragons, who still have all six of their members standing. The Iron Dragons captains, Zara Malik and Axel Kovačević, go against the Cobra Kai trio alone and beat them easily. Note: The episode is dedicated to actor Chad McQueen, who played Dutch in The Karate Kid (1984) and died in 2024.
57	7	"Dog in the Fight"	Joel Novoa	Ashley Darnall	November 15, 2024
Johnny and Daniel are having issues with motivating the team as Miyagi-Do performs poorly in the second event of the tournament, and need to earn more points to avoid elimination. Daniel gets a message from Serrano, a former Sekai Taikai contestant who claims to have known Miyagi, and decides to meet him for answers at the given address; however, he is abducted by some thugs, one of whom wears a Cobra Kai tattoo on his arm, forcing him to miss the next event of the tournament, and Johnny to step up and coach the team alone. Tensions between Miguel and Robby rise when Miguel tells him he is wasting his opportunity to be captain, since his issues with Tory have clearly affected his fights; he tells Robby that he should either step up or hand over the captain position. After Miyagi-Do has an argument in the locker room due to their poor performance, a remorseful Devon admits to Johnny that she cheated during the team tryouts by sabotaging Kenny, but he encourages her to do her best regardless and promises not to say anything. Miyagi-Do advances to the next round thanks to Miguel's victory against two fighters from the Dublin Thunder dojo. However, he and Johnny get a phone call from Rosa letting them know that Carmen is having complications with her pregnancy and is at the hospital, so they suddenly return home.
58	8	"Snakes on a Plane"	Jennifer Celotta	Ashley Darnall & Emily Abbott	November 15, 2024
After Miguel's departure, Johnny asks Amanda to contact Kenny and convince him to replace Miguel. However, Kenny explains to Amanda that he has no interest in being part of the team because he still thinks that Anthony was the one who used the laxatives on him. Miguel and Johnny argue on the plane, as he tells Johnny that he didn't support him in the tournament. Zara gets jealous of the attention that Tory receives from the other contestants and sleeps with Robby after he gets drunk at a bar, and Tory witnesses a kiss between them the morning afterward. Amanda has Anthony attempt to apologize to Kenny, but they fight instead. Johnny apologizes to Miguel, and they make amends after the latter hits an annoying passenger. Sam and Axel encounter each other on the beach, and he tries kissing her after an conflite with Kwon and Yoon but leaves disappointed after learning she has a boyfriend. Yasmine dumps Demetri after Hawk calls Moon and inadvertently shows Demetri dancing with a Spanish girl at the bar. To get rid of her guilt after Hawk is frustrated with Demetri's unwillingness to take accountability for his actions with Yasmine, Devon calls Kenny and confesses that she was the one who spiked his drink with laxatives during the team tryouts. Kenny reconciles with Anthony and accepts the trip to Barcelona. Johnny and Miguel find out that Carmen's complications were resolved successfully, and she tells them to return to Barcelona and win. Chozen and Da-Eun have a sexual encounter and, along with Daniel and Kreese, find out that Sensei Wolf and the thug who kidnapped Daniel are both working for Terry Silver.
59	9	"Blood In Blood Out"	Sherwin Shilati	Chris Rafferty	November 15, 2024
Three months prior to the Sekai Taikai, Silver hides out in Bangkok to avoid arrest. After his lawyer is able to get the charges dropped, Silver hires Sensei Wolf by promising to pay his debts in exchange for buying the Iron Dragons dojo and humiliating Miyagi-Do during the Sekai Taikai. In the present, it is revealed that the thug who kidnapped Daniel is Dennis De Guzmán, a former henchman of Mike Barnes. (Note: As depicted in The Karate Kid Part III (1989)) Johnny returns to Barcelona with Miguel and Kenny, who is replacing Devon. She apologizes to Kenny, and they make amends. Hawk and Demetri distrust Kenny, thinking he is secretly working with Silver, so they refuse to tag him in the next event, causing them to lose. Silver offers Kenny a spot in his dojo, but he refuses and shows him a middle finger after he helps Miyagi-Do win the next event after Robby tags him in. The team celebrates; meanwhile, in order to mess with Silver, Johnny & Chozen decide to provoke Kreese by stealing his eunjangdo from his locker and replacing it with a spa ticket to frame Silver, causing Kreese to furiously punch Silver. Da-Eun accuses Chozen of stealing the eunjangdo, and warns him to give it back to prevent Kreese from becoming even more erratic. Miyagi-Do faces Cobra Kai in the second elimination round, and Tory confronts Robby about his hookup with Zara. He learns Kwon messed with him, fooling him into thinking Tory had left Robby for Kwon. In the decisive point, Robby defeats Kwon, advancing Miyagi-Do to the Tournament of Champions and eliminating Cobra Kai from the tournament. Silver hands Daniel an envelope containing records of Mr. Miyagi's participation in the Sekai Taikai, showing that he killed his opponent during a match. After a vengeful Kreese finds his eunjangdo back in the locker, he states that it's not over until he says so.
60	10	"Eunjangdo"	Sherwin Shilati	Bob Dearden & Olga Lexell	November 15, 2024
Daniel has a nightmare where he fights a younger Mr. Miyagi in the final round of a past Sekai Taikai, who says that he never told Daniel everything about his past because he was never strong enough to accept the truth. Tournament director Gunther Braun confirms to Daniel that Silver's information about Mr. Miyagi is correct. Tensions run high as Cobra Kai prepares to return home after being eliminated, only to receive a second chance when the Russian dojo Tiger Strike, which had advanced to the Tournament of Champions, is disqualified due to four of its students failing a drug test for steroids. The Tournament of Champions, consisting of duels between only the captains of the top four teams -- Miyagi-Do, Cobra Kai, Iron Dragons and Furia de Pantera -- begins with Kwon fighting against Furia de Pantera's male captain, Zara facing off against Furia de Pantera's female captain, Robby pitted against Axel, and Tory and Sam facing each other. Kwon and Zara easily win their respective matches, with Kwon's decisive knockout earning Cobra Kai extra points. However, during the match between Robby and Axel, Robby is pushed by Axel into the Cobra Kai students, and Kwon elbows him in the ribs with a cheap shot. As Miguel tries to come to his aid, he is knocked down by Axel, who envies him for being Sam's boyfriend. Gunther warns all the competitors to get off the mats, only to be knocked unconscious by Sensei Ivanov of Tiger Strike. This ignites a brawl between all the competitors and senseis, where Johnny and Daniel face off against Wolf. Robby faces off against most of Cobra Kai except for Tory, who fights Zara. Miguel and Axel duel, and Sam, after beating Dublin Thunder captain Cara, helps Robby and Tory dispose of several Iron Dragons students aiding Zara. Meanwhile, Kreese goes after Silver with his eunjangdo, but it slips out from under his belt during the chaos. Upon discovering this, Kreese fights Silver hand-to-hand. They fight evenly until Silver hides, and then sucker punches Kreese. Silver then takes over the fight and has Kreese on the ropes until Johnny intervenes and saves his former sensei. When Kwon attacks Sam, Axel stops his fight with Miguel and attacks Kwon, kicking him into a camera. Kwon then notices the eunjangdo, grabs it and goes after Axel. However, Axel counters his attacks and kicks him in mid-air, causing Kwon to fall on the knife and fatally impale himself in the chest. As everyone stares in shock and horror, Gunther orders to cut the television feed.
Part 3
61	11	"Into the Fire"	Joe Piarulli	Joe Piarulli & Luan Thomas	February 13, 2025
Following the incident at the Sekai Taikai, a funeral is held for Kwon in South Korea. When they return to training, Sun-Yung forces Yoon to brutally beat up his teammates. Back home, Robby has trouble getting into college and Daniel is disturbed over what happened in Barcelona. Silver intercepts Gunther to get him to resume the Sekai Taikai; Gunther agrees to resume it if all the senseis agree. Johnny agrees to return to the Sekai Taikai but Daniel does not. Kreese tells Sun-Yung that Cobra Kai will not return to the Sekai Taikai. Silver talks to Johnny so that he can convince Daniel to return to the tournament. Johnny holds a meeting with Daniel and Silver; Silver reveals that he wants a victory before he dies of his terminal illness and Daniel finally agrees to participate again. Da-Eun, eager to be the master of the dojo, kills her grandfather before vowing to use a more peaceful method of teaching. Kreese decides to head back to the Valley to deal with unfinished business.
62	12	"Rattled"	William Zabka	Ashley Darnall & Kyle Civale	February 13, 2025
The Sekai Taikai has agreed to hold the remainder of the tournament in the Valley, giving Miyagi-Do home field advantage. Hawk and Demetri develop an AI training simulation to help Robby prepare for his match with Axel. However, Robby is still rattled from his experience against Axel in Barcelona until Miguel gives him a pep talk. Sam reaches out to Tory to help her train while also trying to convince her to rejoin the tournament. Sam admits she wants to pass on UCLA to spend a year overseas in Okinawa. When Chozen finally hears back from Kumiko and she admits she only loves him as a friend, Daniel and Amanda take him along on a trip to Ojai to fix him up with Moon's mother, Winnie, which goes disastrously. Johnny, meanwhile, tries to plan a proposal for Carmen only to be interrupted when she goes into labor. They finally have an impromptu wedding at the hospital, officiated by Johnny's old friend Bobby, before Carmen gives birth to their daughter Laura, named after Johnny's mother.
63	13	"Skeletons"	Joel Novoa	Chris Rafferty	February 13, 2025
All the dojos prepare for the resumption of the Sekai Taikai, with doubts about whether all of Cobra Kai will be there. Kreese meets with Tory and tells her that he only re-registered the dojo so that she can win and apologizes for what he put her through and for Kwon. On the day of the men's semi-finals, Kreese also tries to apologize to Johnny but Johnny rejects him. The match between Robby and Axel resumes with a close first round. In the second round, Axel adjusts to the rhythm of the match and easily defeats Robby. Daniel encourages Robby to win the match but Axel breaks Robby's knee and Axel moves on to the finals. Sam hesitates about fighting her match against Tory and ultimately decides not to. This decision is supported by Daniel, who had a dream about Mr. Miyagi rescuing him from skeleton bullies (akin to Johnny and his Cobra Kai friends) and reminded Daniel that he taught him so he wouldn't have to fight. After Sam withdraws, Miyagi-Do resigns from the tournament and Axel is about to be declared men's champion after the vacancy left by Kwon. Johnny and Kreese reunite after their turbulent past and embrace. In the end, Johnny reclaims Cobra Kai, with Tory and Miguel (who is replacing Kwon) as captains after Kreese gives up his position to Johnny, much to the shock and fury of Wolf and Silver.
64	14	"Strike Last"	Josh Heald	Bob Dearden	February 13, 2025
Daniel buys the old Cobra Kai dojo for Johnny to train Miguel and Tory before the Sekai Taikai finals. Johnny advises Miguel that after everything he's been through, he should fight for himself first and foremost. In the finals, Cobra Kai's plan is to reduce the point gap between them and Iron Dragons. The first final is the women's final, in which Zara easily wins the first round after provoking Tory. Robby talks to Tory and they kiss, which makes Tory focus and easily beat Zara by knocking her out. In the men's final, Miguel surprisingly wins the first round against Axel but after talking to Wolf he beats Miguel in the second round leaving a points gap between them. Wolf tells Axel to break Miguel's spine; Axel ultimately refuses and Miguel ends up winning the match. Disgusted with Wolf's tactics, Axel resigns from Iron Dragons. After the finals, Cobra Kai and Iron Dragons are tied and the champion dojo is decided in a match between their senseis. Silver plots in his yacht and orders Dennis to kidnap Carmen and her daughter. Kreese kills Dennis and he and Silver fight, overturning a fuel container. Silver pins down Kreese and begins to throttle him. Kreese manages to grab the lit cigar he dropped and tosses it into the fuel, blowing up the yacht and killing them both.
65	15	"Ex-Degenerate"	Jon Hurwitz & Hayden Schlossberg	Josh Heald & Jon Hurwitz & Hayden Schlossberg	February 13, 2025
Johnny prepares for his fight against Sensei Wolf with Daniel and Chozen; Daniel explains that whether he wins or loses the fight, he already has a family and has already won in life and they begin training. On the day of the fight, Wolf berates Johnny in the locker room and Johnny tries to hit him but Wolf easily subdues him and distracts him by talking about defeating him and his family. Before the fight, Demetri and Yasmine reconcile and get back together. In the match between senseis, at first Wolf bests Johnny winning two points while performing illegal moves that weaken Johnny. Daniel gives Johnny a Cobra Kai style speech that makes him confident and face Wolf. Johnny and Wolf have an exchange of blows in which Johnny scores the winning point proclaiming Cobra Kai the champion dojo of the Sekai Taikai. Some time later, Johnny moves into a new house with Carmen and Laura while Miguel, Sam, Robby, Tory, Hawk, and Demetri continue their respective paths. Chozen goes to Korea to meet back up with Da-Eun. Johnny and Daniel collaborate with their students as senseis to train them in Cobra Kai and Miyagi-Do at the same time.

== Production ==
=== Development ===
On January 20, 2023, Netflix renewed Cobra Kai for a sixth and final season. At the time of the announcement, series creators Josh Heald, Jon Hurwitz, and Hayden Schlossberg stated that they wished to end the series on their terms. Heald, Hurwitz, and Schlossberg returned to executive produce the series through their production company Counterbalance Entertainment. Series stars Ralph Macchio and William Zabka also serve as executive producers alongside Will Smith, James Lassiter and Caleeb Pinkett for Westbrook Entertainment and Susan Ekins for Sony Pictures Television. Production on the season was slated to begin in mid-2023. Hurwitz confirmed that writing was underway by April 2023. The following month however, production was halted by the 2023 Writers Guild of America strike but writing resumed in late 2023.

=== Casting ===
Sean Kanan once again reprised his role as Mike Barnes. Barnes initially starred in The Karate Kid Part III (1989) and first returned to the franchise in season 5 of Cobra Kai. Kanan stated that after appearing in the previous season, he remained in contact with Hurwitz, Heald, and Sclossberg, who expressed interest in Barnes returning again. Kanan also said it was his idea for Barnes to take on a sensei role within the series. C. S. Lee was cast to portray Master Kim Sun-Yung, a character first referenced by Terry Silver in Part III.

=== Filming ===
Following the 2023 SAG-AFTRA strike, filming on the season began in Atlanta, Georgia in February 2024, and wrapped on June 10, 2024.

=== Soundtrack ===
Leo Birenberg and Zach Robinson returned to compose the series' soundtrack once more. The first part of the soundtrack was released on July 19, 2024, with a single releasing in the week prior. A single to accompany the second part of the season was released on November 8, with the full soundtrack set to release on November 16.

== Release and marketing ==
The season was originally slated for a December 2023 release on Netflix but was delayed by the strikes. Later details reported that it would release in late 2024. On May 2, 2024, Netflix announced that the season would consist of 15 episodes, split into three parts of five episodes each. It is the first case of Netflix splitting an original series into thirds. The announcement also revealed that the first part would be released on July 18, 2024, followed by the second on November 28. A final release set for 2025 is being titled "The Finale Event". A teaser trailer accompanied the announcement. On July 1, an official trailer for Season 6 Part 1 was released, accompanied by "Shout It Out Loud" by Kiss. The day of the season premiere, it was announced that part two would be released on November 15 instead. The release date for part three was later revealed to be February 13, 2025.

== Reception ==
Cobra Kai season 6
Aggregate scores
Source	Rating
Metacritic	67/100
Rotten Tomatoes	91%
Review scores
Source	Rating

On the review aggregator website Rotten Tomatoes, 91% of 45 critics' reviews are positive, with an average rating of 7.0/10. The website's consensus reads: "Having achieved mastery over its formula, Cobra Kai's sixth and final season doesn't hit as hard but still maintains excellent form."

Metacritic, which uses a weighted average, assigned the film a score of 67 out of 100, based on 11 critics, indicating "generally favorable" reviews.

=== Part 1 ===
Cobra Kai season 6
Part 1
Review scores
Source	Rating
Collider	9/10
Empire	2/5 stars
/Film	8/10
GamesRadar+	2/5 stars
IGN	7/10
Paste	7.8/10

==== Viewing figures ====
The first part ranked in the top spot on Netflix's most viewed shows chart for the week of July 15–21, 2024. It received 14.8 million views within its first four days after release. During this time, 1.1 billion minutes of the season was streamed. Deadline Hollywood theorized that a three-part release caused lower viewership in its first release, but expected higher numbers after the release of the final part due to viewers who wish to binge watch the entire season at one time. In the period of July 22–28, Cobra Kai continued to hold its spot as the most-viewed Netflix series, and received an additional 9.5 million views.

==== Critical response ====
The first part of the season received largely mixed reviews from critics.

=== Part 2 ===
Cobra Kai season 6
Part 2
Review scores
Source	Rating
Collider	6/10
Comic Book Resources	8/10
GamesRadar+	3.5/5 stars
IGN	8/10
Screen Rant	10/10

==== Viewing figures ====
In the United States, the second part was the sixth most-viewed program on Nielsen's streaming chart with 838 million minutes viewed for the week of November 18–24, 2024.

=== Part 3 ===
Cobra Kai season 6
Part 3
Review scores
Source	Rating
Collider	
Comic Book Resources	
GamesRadar+	
IGN	
Screen Rant	

== See also ==
- Cobra Kai
