= Fumio Demura =

Japanese–American karateka and kobudoka (1940–2023)

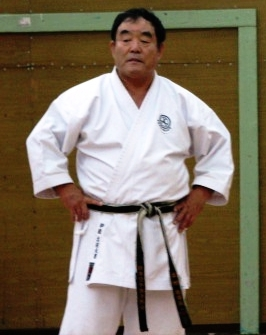
- Demura in 2006
- Born: September 15, 1938; Yokohama, Kanagawa Prefecture, Japan
- Died: April 24, 2023 (aged 84); California, U.S.
- Native name: 出村 文男
- Style: Shitō-ryū karate, Okinawan kobudō
- Teachers: Ryusho Sakagami, Taira Shinken
- Rank: 9th dan black belt

Other information
- Website: genbukai.org

Fumio Demura (出村 文男, Demura Fumio; September 15, 1938 – April 24, 2023) was a Japanese–American karateka and kobudoka, based in the United States since the mid-1960s. A 9th dan in Shitō-ryū karate, he was Pat Morita's martial arts stunt double in the first, third and fourth Karate Kid films, and was one of the inspirations for the character Mr. Miyagi.

== Biography ==
=== Early years ===
Demura was born on September 15, 1938, in Yokohama, Japan. At the age of 9 (1947/48), he began training in karate and kendo under an instructor named Asano. At the age of 12 (1950/51) he started training under Ryusho Sakagami in Itosu-kai karate. Demura received his 1st dan black belt in 1956, and won the East Japan Championships in 1957.

In 1959, he began training in kobudo, a style of traditional Okinawan weapons training, under the direction of Taira Shinken. In 1963, he became acquainted with Kōga-ryū ninjutsu master Seiko Fujita. Demura met martial arts scholar Donn Draeger, who introduced him to Dan Ivan, who would eventually bring him to the United States as a karate instructor.

=== United States ===
In 1965, Demura came to the United States, representing the Japan Karate-do Itosu-kai. From his base in southern California, he became well known for his karate and kobudo skills. In 1971, he was ranked 5th dan, and he remained at that rank until at least 1982. Through the 1970s and 1980s, Demura wrote several martial arts books, including: Shito-Ryu Karate (1971), Advanced nunchaku (1976, co-authored), Tonfa: Karate weapon of self-defense (1982), Nunchaku: Karate weapon of self-defense (1986), Bo: Karate weapon of self-defense (1987), and Sai: Karate weapon of self-defense (1974).

In 1986, Demura was promoted to 7th dan in Shito-ryū karate. In 2005, he was promoted to 9th dan. On July 13, 2022 he was promoted to 10th dan in traditional Karatedo by a collective group of senseis that represented the World Karate Association. He resided in Santa Ana, California, until his death.

=== Karate Kid films ===
In the 1980s, Demura became involved in the Karate Kid series of films. He was the stunt double for Pat Morita, who played Mr. Miyagi. The Karate Kid screenwriter Robert Mark Kamen stated that Mr. Miyagi was named after Chōjun Miyagi, the founder of the Goju-ryu karate style, and that Fumio Demura was one of the inspirations for the character.

Demura appeared in several films and documentaries, including: The Warrior within (1976), The Island of Dr. Moreau (1977), The Karate Kid (1984), The Karate Kid Part III (1989), Shootfighter: Fight to the death (1992), Rising Sun (1993), The Next Karate Kid (1994), Masters of the martial arts (1998, presented by Wesley Snipes), Mystic origins of the martial arts (1998), Modern Warriors (2002), XMA: Xtreme Martial Arts (2003), and Ninja (2009).

=== Later years and death ===
Demura was the subject of the 2015 documentary The Real Miyagi.

He died on April 24, 2023, at the age of 84.
