= Johnny Lawrence (character) =

Fictional character from The Karate Kid franchise

John Lawrence
- The Karate Kid character
- William Zabka as Johnny Lawrence as he appears in The Karate Kid (left) and Cobra Kai (right).
- First appearance: The Karate Kid (1984)
- Last appearance: Karate Kid: Legends (2025)
- Created by: Robert Mark Kamen
- Portrayed by: William Zabka; Owen Stone (young; Cobra Kai seasons 1–2); Thomas Parobek (young; Cobra Kai season 4); Logan Coffey (young; Cobra Kai season 5); Jake Bentley Young (“The Karate Kid: The Musical” St. Louis, 2022)
- Voiced by: William Zabka (Cobra Kai: The Karate Kid Saga Continues)

In-universe information
- Full name: John Lawrence
- Nickname: Johnny
- Title(s): Sensei; Founder of Eagle Fang Karate; Owner of Cobra Kai; 2-time All Valley Karate Champion (1982, 1983); Sekai Taikai World Champion (2020) Birthday: August 20, 1967
- Occupation: Karate instructor (sensei); Car Sales Representative at Larusso Auto Group; Uber driver (formerly); Handyman (formerly)
- Affiliation: Cobra Kai Karate (1979–1984; 2017-2018; 2020–present); Eagle Fang Karate (2018–2019); Miyagi-Do Karate (2019–present); Larusso Auto Group (2019–present)
- Fighting style: Tang Soo Do, Goju Ryu
- Family: Laura Lawrence (mother; deceased); Unnamed father; Sid Weinberg (step-father)
- Significant others: Ali Mills; Shannon Keene; Carmen Diaz-Lawrence (wife)
- Children: Robby Keene (son); Miguel Diaz (stepson); Laura Lawrence (daughter)
- Nationality: American
- Teacher: John Kreese; Daniel LaRusso (temporarily)
- Students: Miguel Diaz; Eli "Hawk" Moskowitz; Aisha Robinson; Tory Nichols; Devon Lee; Kenny Payne; Bert; Mitch; Samantha LaRusso; Demetri Alexopoulos; Robby Keene

John "Johnny" Lawrence is a fictional character in The Karate Kid media franchise, portrayed by William Zabka. Introduced in the film The Karate Kid (1984), Johnny briefly returns at the beginning of the sequel, The Karate Kid Part II (1986). 34 years later, Zabka reprised the role in the sequel television series Cobra Kai (2018–2025), where he served as the main protagonist. He also made a cameo appearance in the film Karate Kid: Legends (2025).

In the original film, Johnny is depicted as the jealous ex-boyfriend of Ali Mills, the prize student of the Cobra Kai karate dojo, and the defending champion of the All-Valley Under-18 Karate Tournament. He becomes Daniel LaRusso's arch-rival after the latter starts dating Ali, frequently bullying him alongside his fellow Cobra Kai students, and ultimately fighting him at the All-Valley, where he loses to Daniel, and is berated and attacked by his sensei/father figure John Kreese after bravely standing up to him.

In Cobra Kai, set decades after the original film, Johnny is depicted as having become a depressed alcoholic repairman who has a strained relationship with his son Robby, in contrast to Daniel, who has become a highly successful car salesman. In the aftermath of the destruction of his car, loss of his job, and getting arrested, a disgruntled Johnny chooses to reopen the long-closed Cobra Kai and trains his neighbor Miguel Diaz, whom he comes to see as a son. When Kreese returns to the San Fernando Valley and takes back the Cobra Kai dojo, Johnny unwillingly joins forces with Daniel to take him and later Terry Silver down.

== Fictional biography ==
Johnny Lawrence was born on August 20, 1966, to Laura (née Brown) and Mr. Lawrence. He knew his father for a short while in his life, before he left the family for unknown reasons when Johnny was five years old. Johnny moved to the upscale neighborhood of Encino, California, after his mother, Laura married Sid Weinberg, an executive producer for Lorimar Television. A friendless Johnny was often verbally abused by his stepfather, especially after quitting drums, roller skating, and magic lessons. As a result, Johnny would use his Walkman to drown out Sid's heckling. One day in 1979, while riding his bicycle, a 13-year-old Johnny discovered the Cobra Kai dojo and spent the next five years learning Tang Soo Do under sensei John Kreese.

Johnny entered the All-Valley Under-18 Karate Tournament for the first time in 1981 but failed to make the finals after losing to the much more experienced Darryl Vidal in the quarter-finals. In 1982, he begins to date Ali Mills, whom he met during a showing of the movie Rocky III.

He also began to take his training more seriously and won back-to-back championships in 1982 and 1983. In the summer of 1984, Ali and Johnny broke up after Johnny got drunk while out with his Cobra Kai friends and missed her birthday, leading to a fight. Daniel LaRusso moved to the area a little while later. Johnny mistakenly believed that Ali cheated on him with Daniel, leading the two to develop a rivalry for the next thirty-four years. Johnny made the All-Valley finals for a third time in 1984, after easily avenging his defeat in the 1981 tournament over Vidal in the semi-finals, but lost to LaRusso. Despite his three appearances and two victories in the tournament finals, he never received the fame or recognition that LaRusso enjoyed after his subsequent victories in 1984 and 1985. This, paired with a violent clash with Kreese, led Johnny to abandon Cobra Kai and karate.

After leaving Cobra Kai, Johnny became aimless for decades, spending most of his time partying and drinking. He eventually developed a relationship with a fellow alcoholic, Shannon Keene. The two had a son together, Robby Keene, who was born on February 4, 2002 – though Johnny later admitted that his mother's recent death led to him being on a drinking binge at the time that caused him to miss his son's birth. Following this, Johnny broke up with Shannon and became estranged from Robby.

In 2018, after spending several years working as a handyman in Reseda, Johnny chanced upon a new neighbor (Miguel Diaz) being targeted by a group of bullies. After Johnny fought off the attackers with his karate skills, Miguel convinces Johnny to reopen the Cobra Kai dojo which renews his rivalry with LaRusso, now a successful owner of a chain of car dealerships and happily married. After losing ownership of Cobra Kai to an unrepentant Kreese, Johnny formed a new dojo named Eagle Fang Karate and teamed up with Daniel and the Miyagi-Do dojo, eventually leading to them ending their rivalry. Johnny also became romantically involved with Miguel's mother Carmen around this time, conceiving a second child — a half-sibling to both Robby and Miguel, who later became step-brothers after Johnny and Carmen’s marriage.

== Appearances ==
=== The Karate Kid (1984) ===
William Zabka as Johnny Lawrence in The Karate Kid

Johnny is the top student of the Cobra Kai dojo, and best friends with its strongest members: Bobby Brown, Tommy, Jimmy, and Dutch. Their sensei is John Kreese, a ruthless master of Tang Soo Do karate and a United States Army veteran from the Vietnam War.

Johnny is the two-time defending champion of the All Valley Under-18 Karate Championships tournament in both 1982 and 1983. Before the events of the film, his girlfriend Ali Mills broke up with him after a two-year relationship. One night at a beach party, Johnny confronts Ali about their breakup and starts getting violent. New Jersey native Daniel LaRusso, who recently moved to the area, tries to stick up for Ali, and Johnny beats him up with his karate skills. Over the next few weeks, Johnny and his Cobra Kai gang harass Daniel in and out of school. At a Halloween dance, Daniel soaks Johnny in the bathroom with a hose while he is rolling a joint, prompting Johnny and the other Cobras to chase him down and beat him until Mr. Miyagi, the maintenance man of Daniel's apartment building, intervenes and defeats Johnny and his gang. The next day, Mr. Miyagi confronts Kreese at the Cobra Kai dojo and proposes that Daniel and Johnny's feud be settled in the upcoming tournament. Kreese agrees, but warns that if they do not attend the tournament, both Daniel and Mr. Miyagi will be declared fair game to Cobra Kai.

At the tournament, Johnny quickly advances to the finals, scoring three unanswered points against a highly skilled opponent in his semi-final match. When Daniel reaches the semi-finals, Bobby Brown, one of the more compassionate Cobras and the least vicious of Daniel's tormentors, reluctantly (under orders from Kreese) strikes Daniel's knee with an illegal kick, getting himself disqualified while Johnny looks at Kreese in disgust. Before Johnny is declared the victor by default, Ali informs the tournament announcer that Daniel will fight in the final round. During the fight, Daniel gets the upper hand and gives Johnny a bloody nose. Kreese orders Johnny to sweep Daniel's leg, considered unethical because of Daniel's injury. Fearing his sensei, Johnny manages to land an elbow on Daniel's bad leg, receiving a warning from the referee. Upon the restart of the round, Johnny loses the match after Daniel lands a crane kick to his face. Having gained a new respect for his nemesis, Johnny personally gives Daniel the trophy.

=== The Karate Kid Part II (1986) ===
Kreese harshly reprimands Johnny for standing up to him and for losing to Daniel, breaking his second-place trophy and locking him in a chokehold. The other Cobra Kai students, except for Dutch and Jimmy plead for Kreese to let go of Johnny until Mr. Miyagi intervenes. Mr. Miyagi dodges Kreese's punches, causing Kreese to injure his hands from breaking two car windows. He further humiliates Kreese by mocking Cobra Kai's founding tenets and tweaking his nose after halting a fatal blow deathly close to its target.

=== The Karate Kid Part III (1989) ===
Kreese tells Silver at the beginning of the film that he is closing the dojo, as Johnny and his friends left Cobra Kai following the incident that occurred when Kreese assaulted him. He only appears in the opening credits flashbacks from the first two films

=== Cobra Kai (2018–2025) ===
==== Season 1 ====
Cobra Kai picks up 34 years after the first film. Now in his 50s, Johnny is a down-on-his-luck alcoholic loner who is estranged from his now-teenaged son Robby who he had with his ex-girlfriend Shannon Keene when both were younger, spending most of his time eating junk food, drinking Coors Banquet and often resorting to bottles of whiskey when depressed. He struggles to make a living as a handyman in the San Fernando Valley, but is fired from this job after getting into an argument with a customer.

He appears to be oblivious to most technology released after the 1990s, as he still carries a flip phone and is unfamiliar with the Internet and social media platforms such as Facebook. In addition, Johnny cites Iron Eagle as his favorite movie and others 80's movies like First Blood, Over the Top, Bloodsport, Young Guns II, Missing in Action, Best of the Best and the Rocky saga, and continues to listen to classic 1980s rock music, like Ratt, Van Halen, Black Sabbath, Scorpions, Twisted Sister, AC/DC, Metallica, Guns N' Roses and Billy Idol. He also is jealous of Daniel, who is now the owner of a successful car dealership despite showing good sportsmanship to him by handing the trophy during the 1984 All-Valley Tournament. The duo re-encounter each other after Johnny's red Pontiac Firebird is towed to his dealership following a hit and run committed by Yasmine, a friend of Daniel's daughter Samantha. Johnny reluctantly allows Daniel to have the car repaired for free, but is enraged to find out that Sam is Daniel's daughter.

One night, Johnny intervenes after witnessing his teenage neighbor Miguel Diaz being harassed by a group of rich bullies at a convenience store. Johnny defeats Kyler and his gang, but is arrested in the process. He is bailed out by Sid, who disowns him and offers to buy him out of his life with an undisclosed sum of money. Johnny initially rejects the money out of pride, but after reuniting with Daniel, Johnny uses the money to reopen the Cobra Kai dojo, with Miguel as his first student. Johnny initially struggles to gain new students, but after Miguel beats up Kyler and his crew in the cafeteria while they are confronting Sam, dozens of new recruits flock to the dojo.

Johnny tries to enter Cobra Kai in the upcoming All-Valley Under-18 Karate Championships tournament, but he discovers that the dojo has been given a lifetime ban due to the ruthless actions of Kreese, Terry Silver, and Mike Barnes. Johnny decides to appeal the ban, telling the All-Valley Committee that his Cobra Kai is run differently than it was under Kreese, claiming that Kreese has been dead for years and he has never had any association with or even heard of Silver or Barnes. Johnny explains that he alone holds authority over the dojo and that he endeavors to make a difference in the lives of local youth who have been bullied. The board votes to lift the ban and allow Cobra Kai to enter the tournament over the objections of Daniel, who is a committee member. As the dojo gains more students, Johnny gradually earns enough money to keep it afloat and pay back Sid, vowing to never return to him again.

On the back of this success, Johnny trains his dojo even more rigorously. However, his conflict with Daniel is exacerbated by a series of misunderstandings, culminating with Daniel's cousin Louie destroying Johnny's car and assaulting him supposedly in Daniel's name. Enraged, Johnny comes to Daniel's home to fight him, but Daniel's wife, Amanda, manages to defuse the conflict by inviting Johnny to breakfast to discuss the matter peacefully and persuades her husband to give Johnny a car from the trade-in lot of his dealership as compensation. While test driving a 2009 Dodge Challenger R/T, Johnny and Daniel make considerable progress coming to terms, until their return to Daniel's residence leads to Johnny discovering that Robby is Daniel's karate protégé and new employee. At that point, an enraged Johnny shoves Daniel against the wall and storms out.

At the All-Valley tournament, both Miguel and Hawk make it to the semi-finals, along with Robby. When Robby and Hawk fight in the semi-finals, Johnny chastises Hawk for illegally attacking Robby's shoulder, which gets him disqualified and leaves Robby and Miguel. When Miguel exploits Robby's injured shoulder against his sensei's wishes, Johnny realizes that his teaching methods have corrupted his students. Miguel wins the tournament and thanks Johnny for his guidance, but Johnny is too upset by his actions to celebrate. He stops Robby before he can leave the arena and apologizes to him, which Robby seemingly accepts. Later that night, John Kreese shows up unexpectedly at the Cobra Kai dojo to congratulate him.

==== Season 2 ====
At the start of the season, Johnny addresses the unethical tactics committed by Miguel and Hawk against his son Robby during the tournament and downgrades his entire team back to white belts to further discipline them, banning any form of cheating or dirty fighting from the dojo despite their "no mercy" teachings. He also begins employing a stricter training regimen, going so far as forcing his students to push a full concrete mixer from the inside. To further promote his dojo, Johnny has his Dodge Challenger repainted black and decorated with Cobra Kai logos, and has the sound system replaced with a cassette player for his mixtape collection. Johnny initially rebuffs Kreese's attempts to reconcile and blames him for ruining his life. After Kreese apologizes for his previous actions and repairs Johnny's second-place trophy, he relents and agrees to partner with Kreese by making him an observer before making him a co-sensei.

In the meantime, Daniel reopens Miyagi-Do in an attempt to compete with and undermine Cobra Kai by offering lessons for free. While Daniel initially has little success in these efforts, several Cobra Kai students defect to Miyagi-do after a group of students led by Hawk proceeds to vandalize the Miyagi-do dojo with the blessing of Kreese. Johnny eventually discovers that Kreese has been teaching his students the old ways of Cobra Kai behind his back and expels him from the dojo. During this time, Johnny buys a used laptop and discovers the Internet. He also upgrades to a smartphone, joins Facebook, and eventually finds love in Miguel's mother Carmen. At the same time, Johnny slowly reconciles with Robby, who eventually moves in with his father. After a chance encounter at a restaurant, Johnny and Daniel make another attempt at reconciliation. But their uneasy peace proves short-lived after a misunderstanding involving Robby and Samantha, leading to a showdown between Daniel and Johnny in the latter's apartment that results in Daniel cutting ties with Johnny and Robby.

Making matters worse, a massive conflict between the two dojos' students erupts on the first day of school, beginning with Cobra Kai student Tory Nichols picking a fight with Daniel's daughter Samantha in retaliation for a drunken kiss with Miguel at Moon's party and ending with Johnny’s son Robby inadvertently putting Miguel in the hospital. Johnny's life and relationships are in limbo, with a missing Robby expelled from school and in legal trouble, and Carmen breaking up with him. Meanwhile, Kreese regains control of Cobra Kai and forces Johnny out, revealing that while Johnny was visiting his dying friend Tommy, he made a deal with the landlord to take over the dojo. After most of Cobra Kai's students turn against Johnny and side with Kreese, Johnny capitulates and leaves the dojo.

A guilt-ridden Johnny goes to the beach and gets drunk, haunted by Miguel's injuries and Robby's uncertain fate. He throws his bottle of whiskey at his car, abandoning it and his smartphone, which he drops in the sand. He walks away, unaware that Ali has sent him a friend request on Facebook.

==== Season 3 ====
Reeling from the fallout of Miguel's hospitalization, Johnny visits Miguel's intensive care unit and gives him some encouraging words to help him wake from his coma. He reluctantly agrees to pair with Daniel in searching for Robby, but the two eventually part ways after a confrontation while following a lead. In order to make amends, Johnny acquires funding for Miguel's surgery by stealing one of Sid's statues to sell at a pawn shop. He also makes failed attempts at reconciling with Robby after his arrest, but a resentful Robby cuts ties with Johnny after missing a planned visit to stay with Miguel's family. Once Miguel gets out of the hospital, Johnny then dedicates his time to helping provide him with physical therapy that includes unorthodox methods, and manages to succeed after taking him to a Dee Snider concert, mending his initial rift with Miguel and Carmen in the process.

Motivated by his success with Miguel, Johnny creates a new martial arts dojo called Eagle Fang, composed of Miguel and several other students that Kreese has expelled from Cobra Kai, including Mitch and Bert. Johnny also reconnects with Ali briefly for the Christmas holidays and finally gets closure with her and ends his rivalry with Daniel, while Miguel does the same thing at the students' level by rekindling his romance with Sam and negotiating an alliance between the students of Miyagi-Do and Eagle Fang.

When Johnny becomes aware of Cobra Kai attacking Miyagi-Do and Eagle Fang at Daniel's home, he confronts Kreese alone and gains the upper hand on him, only to be interrupted by Robby, who has joined Cobra Kai after getting out of juvenile hall to Johnny's dismay. After accidentally knocking out Robby during his fight, Johnny is ambushed by Kreese and nearly choked to death, only for Daniel to intervene and defeat Kreese. Johnny then gives Daniel the approval to finish off Kreese, only for Miguel and Sam to intervene. Kreese agrees to cease hostilities with both Johnny and Daniel until the upcoming All-Valley tournament before walking back into the dojo with Robby, who has firmly sided with Kreese. Finding common ground, Johnny and Daniel agree to train together with their students at Miyagi-Do.

==== Season 4 ====
Despite their new alliance, tensions persist between Johnny and Daniel due to conflicting ideologies and lessons for their students. Furthermore, Johnny becomes jealous when Miguel enthusiastically pairs with Daniel to learn his style of karate, and fears losing his best student to Daniel after losing Robby to Kreese. Eventually, the tensions explode into a karate match between Johnny and Daniel, which ends with no clear winner, and the two cease working together and decide to train their dojos separately. Despite this, Johnny secretly trains Sam, as she has taken a liking to his style of karate.

During this time, Johnny starts taking his relationship with Carmen more seriously, straining his relationship with Miguel. After learning that new Cobra Kai co-sensei and Kreese's old friend Terry Silver has loaned Robby a car and bribed Shannon with money and a job offer, Johnny confronts him at the old Cobra Kai dojo. In the ensuing fight, Silver handily defeats Johnny but Kreese intervenes and ends the fight before Silver can finish him off.

At the tournament, most of Johnny's students are defeated by both Miyagi-do and Cobra Kai with the exception of Miguel. During the match between Miguel and Hawk (who has joined Miyagi-do), Miguel is seriously injured after spraining a muscle and Hawk wins the match by default when Miguel refuses to fight any further. After Hawk defeats Robby in the All-Boys tournament and Sam makes it to the overall finals, Daniel approaches Johnny and they agree to team up against Cobra Kai after noticing that both students have used both styles of karate with success. However, Cobra Kai ultimately defeats both Eagle Fang and Miyagi-do after Tory defeats Sam, allowing Cobra Kai to win the most points overall. Unbeknownst to anyone except Tory, Silver secretly bribed the referee to rig the final match in Cobra Kai's favor. Meanwhile, Silver has gotten Kreese arrested by framing him for the near-fatal assault on former Cobra Kai student Stingray.

In the aftermath of the tournament, Johnny visits the now-abandoned Cobra Kai dojo. While silently reminiscing about opening the dojo, Robby arrives, where they briefly connect over their shared failures with their students after the former witnessed his protégé Kenny's increasingly violent behavior against Daniel's son Anthony due to Cobra Kai's influence, and the two reconnect with a hug. Johnny returns to his apartment and is then shocked to learn that Miguel has traveled to Mexico to track down his biological father. Johnny promises Carmen that he will find Miguel and bring him home.

==== Season 5 ====
Accompanied by Robby, Johnny travels to Mexico where he convinces Miguel to come home. Upon returning, Johnny is initially freaked out but is elated when he learns that Carmen is now pregnant with his and Carmen's child and works towards building a family with her. However, he refuses to have anything more to do with the fight against Cobra Kai as Kreese has been placed behind bars, due to having been framed for attempted murder. On the other hand, Johnny has to deal with rising tensions between Robby and Miguel due to their previous history. After Amanda leaves Daniel over his obsession with Terry Silver, Johnny helps him to see how his obsession is affecting his family and the two men commiserate on their past, even joking about how they might have gotten over their rivalry a long time ago if they had just fought it out with each other. Inspired by his conversation with Daniel, Johnny makes the two boys fight each other, leading to a reconciliation and Johnny inadvertently revealing to Miguel and Robby with their half-sibling, much to their joy.

With his new family now united, Johnny subsequently agrees to rejoin the fight against Cobra Kai, but a dejected Daniel wants nothing more to do with it after being severely beaten by Silver due to being depressed about his resentment towards Silver straining his relationship with Amanda and his family. Chozen and Johnny decide to storm a local Cobra Kai dojo, defeating one of the senseis, but are quickly forced to flee when Sensei Kim Da-Eun shows up. With the help of the Miyagi-Do and Eagle Fang students, Robby, Amanda and Sam are able to change Daniel's mind, knowing that if they have any chance of defeating Silver, they need Daniel's leadership. In tandem with Daniel's former rival Chozen Toguchi, they begin working together again, but much more seamlessly. After learning from Kreese that Silver plans to enroll Cobra Kai in the Sekai Taikai, an international karate tournament, Daniel and Johnny are able to get Miyagi-Do and Eagle Fang invited as well, but are informed that they must choose a single name for their combined dojos for the tournament instead of being Miyagi-Do and Eagle Fang.

Johnny and Carmen inform Daniel, Amanda, and Chozen that they are having a baby and they celebrate by going out to a bar together. While on their way to another bar, Johnny, Daniel and Chozen are confronted by Mike Barnes, Silver's former student who hijacks their limo and furiously demands retribution for Silver burning down his furniture store. Chozen and Johnny agree to the idea, and Daniel is left stranded in the middle of nowhere when he refuses to join them. The trio make their way to Silver's home, where they are quickly outmatched when Silver's henchmen appear. In the ensuing fight, Barnes is knocked out while Chozen is severely wounded by Silver striking him with a katana. Silver leaves his henchmen to deal with Johnny as he makes his way to the Cobra Kai dojo. Johnny is outmatched by Silver's henchmen, but reinvigorated by the sight of his unborn child's sonogram, he defeats Silver's henchmen using a combination of street fighting, and basic military fighting skills, aided at the last minute by a recovered Barnes.

Johnny then drives Chozen and Barnes to the Cobra Kai dojo just in time to witness Silver's arrest on a litany of charges thanks to his and Daniel's students exposing Silver's bribing of the tournament referee and Stingray confessing to Silver attacking him. Johnny reunites with Carmen and celebrates Silver's downfall with Daniel, congratulating him on finally taking Silver down. The two are then informed by a detective that Kreese has been killed in a fight in prison, but are unaware that Kreese faked his death and escaped.

==== Season 6 ====
Following Cobra Kai's fall and Silver's arrest, both Johnny and Daniel attempt to get Miyagi-Do prepared for the upcoming Sekai Taikai tournament. He finds out the Eagle Fang warehouse has been demolished, with this, he decides to retire the Eagle Fang dojo and join Miyagi do permanently. At a gender reveal party at the Larusso house, a mysterious package shows up at the door, thinking it's a bomb, it's actually part the reveal and sprays pink paint on both Johnny and Daniel, revealing Johnny and Carmen will have a girl. The announcement is made that the tournament will be held in Barcelona, Spain, and each dojo must choose their six best fighters to compete with one boy and one girl serving as captains. To prevent nepotism from factoring into the decision, they both recruit Barnes to do the judging. Johnny attempts to get Barnes to focus on Devon as he thinks she has true potential, after Devon makes the first cut, Johnny learns that she will not make the final one, he fights Barnes and convinces him to review his notes, leading to a capture the flag challenge. When Daniel learns of this, he becomes disappointed, soiling their relationship. At the same time, Johnny starts a job at LaRusso Auto in order to get a bigger house for his family, and starts a failed rebellion owing to his frustration with Daniel, leading to him discovering that Daniel has fallen out of balance due to discovering a mysterious secret about Mr. Miyagi. When the time comes to select team captains, Daniel referee's Robby and Miguel's match, while Johnny referees Sam and Tory's. During the girls fight, Daniel prevents Tory from winning after discovering that her mother died and she is not in a good headspace. Johnny argues to let the fight finish, which Daniel vehemently disagrees with. The conflict escalates to Johnny calling Mr. Miyagi a "liar and a thief", to which Daniel punches him in the face; Johnny then vows to leave the dojo after the Sekai Taikai. When they arrive in Barcelona, they are shocked to see Kreese and Kim Da-Eun together with students from Master Kim Sun-Yung's dojo, and also see Tory with them.

During the tournament, Miyagi-Do has difficulty with the other skilled dojos, particularly Kreese's dojo with Kwon Jae Sung as boy's captain and Tory as their girl's captain. Johnny also makes a rivaling with Feng Xiao, aka Sensei Wolf, sensei and owner of the Hong Kong based Iron Dragons, also is three-time Sekai Taikai winning and is the youngest fighter to win the Sekai Taikai. When Daniel is kidnapped by Wolf and Silver's goons, Johnny is forced to train the entire dojo himself, causing his students, particularly Miguel and Sam, to grow upset with him. Complications grow further when Johnny learns that Carmen has had complications with her pregnancy, causing him and Miguel to fly back to the Valley. Upon arriving, they learn she had an emergency Cervical cerclage, but was resolved successfully, but take the opportunity to bring Kenny back as a replacement for Devon, who confesses she sabotaged Kenny during capture the flag by putting Mitch's laxatives in his water. When they return, they discover Silver is back as the Iron Dragons's businessperson. As the tournament progresses, Miyagi-Do defeats Cobra Kai to earn a spot in the semifinals; however, it was discovered that one of the finalist dojos, Tiger Strike dojo, cheated by using drugs, thus removing them from the tournament and putting Cobra Kai back in. In the semi finals, after Kwon and Iron Dragons girl captain, Zara Malik, qualify to the finals, Robby faces off against Iron Dragons male captain, Axel Kovacevic, during the match, Robby is unsuccessful in landing a point on Axel. Kwon takes the opportunity to elbow him in the ribs, causing an argument to break out. At the same time, Gunther, the head of the Sekai Taikai, is knocked out by the Tiger Strike senseis, leading to a massive karate brawl between all the Sekai Taikai dojos. During the chaos, Kreese searches for Silver to kill him, only to drop his eunjangdo on the way, giving Silver an upper hand. Before Silver can deal a killing blow, Johnny steps in to save Kreese. Things come to a halt when Kwon finds Kreese's eunjangdo, and accidentally impales himself with it in an attempt to kill Axel, thus killing himself in the process.

Following Kwon's death, the tournament is cancelled, and everyone returns to the valley. Whilst working at the dealership, Johnny is ambushed by Silver, who asks Johnny to convince Daniel to finish the tournament. Johnny begrudgingly sets up a meeting between him, Daniel, and Silver at Daniel's house, where Silver reveals he is ill and about to die. At Rosa's insistence, Johnny prepares to propose to Carmen, to the point of hiring his friend Bobby, who has become a pastor. After Rosa praises him for his dedication to Carmen, the two discover Carmen is going into labor at the hospital. Johnny rushes there, and proposes, which Carmen accepts. Then, the LaRussos, Chozen, Robby, Miguel, and Bobby, as well as a group of violinists, arrive to marry the two. After exchanging vows, Carmen finally gives birth to her and Johnny's daughter, whom they name Laura after Johnny's mother. At the tournament, Johnny is met by Kreese, who, after realizing the error of his ways in the aftermath of Kwon's death, apologizies to Johnny, admitting that Johnny's decades long slump was due to him. Picking up where the tournament left off, Robby fights Axel. As Robby tries to get the upper hand, Axel breaks Robby's right knee, thus eliminating him from the tournament. Sam elects to not fight Tory, thus removing Miyagi-Do from the competition altogether. During the tournament, Johnny goes to Kreese and admits that he ruined his life as he idolized him, and his betrayal led to Johnny losing his self-esteem and becoming depressed; Kreese comes to terms with this and remorsefully embraces Johnny. To make up for his failures as a teacher, Kreese gives the Cobra Kai dojo back to Johnny, allowing a chance to prevent the Iron Dragons from winning. As the tournament continues, Tory defeats Zara, thus becoming the girl's champion, while Miguel is named as Cobra Kai's boys captain defeats Axel, becoming the boy's champion. With both dojos now tied, Gunther determines the tiebreaker is to have the dojos' senseis, Johnny and Sensei Wolf, fight one match. Unbeknownst to Johnny, Kreese has sacrificed his own life by blowing up the yacht to kill Silver and Dennis to prevent them from kidnapping Johnny’s wife Carmen and their new baby daughter during their plot to sabotage Johnny right before the final match with Sensei Wolf. With the support of Daniel and all the other students, Johnny makes a comeback with the final three points and defeats Sensei Wolf, making Cobra Kai the world champion karate dojo. Following this victory, Johnny and Carmen move into a new home with Laura, while Johnny returns to teach kids Cobra Kai karate as offense, while making them also learn Miyagi-Do from Daniel as defense. The final scene shows them eating at a Japanese restaurant and talking about the upcoming All-Valley. Daniel tries to catch a fly with chopsticks, but Johnny squashes it, saying, "no mercy" to Daniel’s amusement.

=== Karate Kid: Legends (2025) ===
Lawrence appears briefly at the end of the film. He and Daniel LaRusso are at the Miyagi-do dojo when Daniel receives a pizza from his student Li Fong in NY. Johnny proposes a pizza parlor called Miyagi-Dough as their next business venture. Daniel turns him down and he tries to come up with puns on famous Karate Kid franchise lines with pizza ingredients as the film ends.

== Commentary ==
Johnny Lawrence, as conceived in the original films, was an archetypal bully. Since the turn of the 21st century, however, the characters of both Johnny and Daniel LaRusso have been more deeply developed.

The thematic genesis for Cobra Kai began with a few works of pop culture. First, the 2007 music video for the song "Sweep the Leg" by No More Kings stars William Zabka (who also directed the video) as a caricature of himself as Johnny, and features references to The Karate Kid, including cameo appearances by Zabka's former Karate Kid co-stars. In a 2010 interview, Zabka jokingly discussed this video in the context of his vision that Johnny was the true hero of the film. In 2013, Macchio and Zabka made guest appearances as themselves in the television sitcom How I Met Your Mother episode "The Bro Mitzvah". In the episode, Macchio is invited to Barney Stinson's bachelor party, leading to Barney shouting that he hates Macchio and that Johnny was the real hero of The Karate Kid. Towards the end of the episode, a clown in the party wipes off his makeup and reveals himself as Zabka. This influenced the launch of Cobra Kai, which gives a balanced perspective for Johnny, Daniel, and other characters. Zabka continued to be a recurring character throughout the ninth season of the show.

Also in 2013, Zabka voiced Johnny in an episode of Robot Chicken entitled "Caffeine-Induced Aneurysm".
