= Terry Silver =

Fictional character from The Karate Kid franchise and Cobra Kai

- The Karate Kid character
- Thomas Ian Griffith as Terry Silver as he appears in The Karate Kid Part III (left) and Cobra Kai (right).
- First appearance: The Karate Kid Part III; (1989)
- Last appearance: "Strike Last"; Cobra Kai; February 13, 2025
- Created by: Robert Mark Kamen
- Portrayed by: Thomas Ian Griffith; Nick Marini (young, Cobra Kai)

In-universe information
- Full name: Terrance Silver
- Occupation: Karate instructor (sensei); U.S. Army Special Forces soldier (formerly); Head of Dynatox Industries (formerly); Birthday: November 16, 1949
- Affiliation: Cobra Kai Karate (1975-1985; 2019); Iron Dragons (2020)
- Fighting style: Tang Soo Do
- Significant other: Cheyenne Hamidi (formerly)
- Nationality: American
- Teacher: Captain Turner; Master Kim Sun-Yung
- Students: Mike Barnes; Daniel LaRusso; Robby Keene; Kenny Payne; Kyler Park; Tory Nichols; Axel Kovačević; Wing; Zara Malik

Terrance "Terry" Silver is a fictional character and one of the main antagonists of The Karate Kid media franchise, portrayed by actor and martial artist Thomas Ian Griffith. He was created by American screenwriter Robert Mark Kamen and introduced in the 1989 film The Karate Kid Part III. Thirty-two years later, Griffith reprised the role in the sequel television series Cobra Kai, appearing as a main cast member from its fourth season to the sixth and final season.

Silver is the former best friend turned-arch-nemesis and fellow Vietnam veteran of Cobra Kai sensei John Kreese, and the co-founder of the dojo itself, as well as the arch-enemy of Daniel LaRusso, Johnny Lawrence, and Chozen Toguchi.

In The Karate Kid Part III, he is depicted as a megalomaniacal and sociopathic businessman who mentally tortures Daniel in an effort to get revenge on him for getting Kreese's dojo shut down. In Cobra Kai, he is shown to have reformed, only for Kreese's return to cause him to mentally devolve into his old state and later usurp him as the main sensei of the dojo, making him the biggest threat in the series.

== Concept and creation ==
=== Writing ===
Franchise creator Robert Mark Kamen initially refused to return for the third The Karate Kid film, as he wanted to take the franchise in a new direction. Inspired by Hong Kong Kung Fu films, he wanted to write a prequel story that would take Daniel LaRusso and Mr. Miyagi back to 16th century China. Both the president of Columbia Pictures Guy McElwaine and producer Jerry Weintraub refused this idea. When Dawn Steel took over from McElwaine, she offered Kamen a deal to write a third film and convinced him by saying that someone else could mess up the characters.

=== Casting ===
John Kreese was initially intended to have a larger role in The Karate Kid Part III. Due to Martin Kove’s schedule conflicts with Hard Time on Planet Earth, the character of Terry Silver (Thomas Ian Griffith) was written into the script, replacing Kreese's role. The Karate Kid Part III was Griffith's first film role. In his youth, Griffith had studied acting and also trained in kenpo karate and tae kwon do. Prior to his casting, he had performed on and off Broadway. Griffith stated that when he was cast in the role, Silver was not written to do martial arts but to antagonize Daniel LaRusso. The narrative shifted after fight choreographer Pat Johnson learned of his background in martial arts. Griffith considered the role of Silver to be out of his reach because he was aged 26 at the time and the character was a Vietnam War veteran about two decades his senior. Ralph Macchio, who was aged 27, performed the role of LaRusso, a teenager. Griffith presumed he would be instead cast as Mike Barnes, a karate champion who fights La Russo.

=== Characterization ===
Director John G. Avildsen became interested in developing Terry Silver as a martial artist after discussing it with Griffith and agreed to add some fight scenes into the role. He gave Griffith opportunities to input ideas into his character. Griffith said the role was portrayed to be larger than life, "to give the adults a laugh and be all scary for the kids". Griffith came up with ideas for antagonizing LaRusso and Avildsen attempted to incorporate them into the film. Griffith portrayed Silver as a psychotic man who enjoys torturing teenagers but he was worried by Silver's personality, considering his portrayal to be too excessive. Avildsen instead encouraged him to use his instincts and play a more over the top character.

In developing the character for Cobra Kai, series creators Josh Heald, Jon Hurwitz, and Hayden Schlossberg thought of Silver as a "really scary Bond villain". They took aspects of the character from the film and wrote him into a modern story. In the series, Silver is enjoying his wealthy lifestyle and shows little interest in getting involved in Cobra Kai with Kreese. He tells Kreese that in the 1980s he was addicted to cocaine and thinks it insane that he was fixated on torturing a teenager. Heald explained that they added the cocaine to his character's backstory to explain Silver's maniacal behaviour and said he had a "Charlie Sheen kind of Wall Street-like lifestyle". The creators insisted that Griffith keep his hair long so that he could wear the character's signature ponytail in the same style as his appearance in The Karate Kid Part III. Despite being uncertain about returning to the character, Griffith was swayed by the detailed backstory that the creators had devised for Silver, which explained much of the character's personality. Griffith described Silver as a "super-smart guy" who attempts to distract himself from his inner demons by his wealthy lifestyle but Kreese brings his demons back and it consumes him.

The Cobra Kai creators were keen to reinvent Silver as a more three-dimensional character rather than the archetypal villain of the 1980s. Griffith said that he was not interested in repeating the same performance, but wanted to stay true to the essence of the character. His fighting style was designed to express the character of Silver in the way that he moves, which Griffith likened to a "coiled snake". He said that much of Silver's character is affected by his time in Vietnam, explaining that he clearly suffers from addiction and post-traumatic stress disorder. He described Silver's journey as a "path of survival" but thought that he is unable to change his path for the better having lived it all his life.

== Backstory ==
Born into a wealthy family, Terry Silver joined the US Army sometime before 1968 and was deployed to Vietnam. During this time, he met John Kreese and the duo became best friends. Silver was given the nickname "Twig" by fellow squadmate Ponytail, because of his skinny stature. Kreese, Ponytail, and Silver were handpicked by Special Forces Captain Turner to take part in covert missions and are trained in the art of Tang Soo Do karate. During one such mission to attack a North Vietnamese Army base, the unit is captured when Silver's radio crackles, leading to Ponytail being executed by their captors. While in captivity, an NVA officer chose Silver to participate in a forced hand-to-hand fight to the death with Turner, only for Kreese to volunteer himself instead. After being saved by an airstrike by the US Air Force, Kreese kills Turner and frees the remaining prisoners. Grateful to Kreese for saving his life, Silver pledged a lifetime debt to him. Silver's experiences in Vietnam left him struggling with posttraumatic stress disorder, and found his return to civilian life difficult. In honor of Ponytail, Silver grows a ponytail after leaving the military.

In 1975 Kreese and Silver return to the Valley after the war. However they were met by hippies who berated them for fighting in the war. Kreese and Silver decided that they needed to teach people to learn some respect and decided to do this by teaching karate. Silver helps Kreese establish the Cobra Kai dojo. However, Silver was forced to help run his family's business at the insistence of his father, who threatened to cut him out of the family inheritance. Though he left Cobra Kai to Kreese, Silver continued to provide financial support and promised to help run the dojo one day. In 1980, Silver was able to fully purchase Cobra Kai and proposed the dojo compete in a global tournament known as the Sekai Taikai, so that it would get worldwide recognition. Kreese declined the offer, hoping to focus on his students, specifically Johnny Lawrence.

== The Karate Kid Part III ==
By 1985, Silver with his wealth founded a toxic waste disposal company called Dynatox Industries where he is the head of the company. The company illegally dumps waste in the environment. He has become a master of karate, even surpassing Kreese in skill. He has also become extremely erratic, owing to a cocaine addiction and now wants to conquer the world.

By this time, the future of Cobra Kai is in doubt when all of Kreese's students leave after he attacked his star student Johnny Lawrence in retaliation for losing to Daniel LaRusso. When Kreese tells Silver he wants to shut down Cobra Kai, Silver vows to help him get revenge on Daniel and Mr. Miyagi and make Cobra Kai successful again. Silver sends Kreese to Tahiti to rest while he hires karate fighter Mike Barnes to defeat Daniel in the next All Valley Under-18 Karate Championships. Silver breaks into Mr. Miyagi's house to gather information on him and Daniel. He's nearly discovered but he hides inside the fireplace. He introduces himself to Daniel and Mr. Miyagi on a later day, claiming that he was sent to help Kreese regain balance. He lies to them saying that Kreese died of a cardiac arrest brought on by a broken heart and sadness at losing all of his karate students. He also blames Kreese's erratic behavior as a result of his years fighting in the Vietnam War. Silver "apologizes" to both Daniel and Mr. Miyagi on behalf of Kreese.

When Silver finds out that Daniel will not fight at the tournament this year, he orders Barnes and his two thugs, Snake and Dennis, to harass Daniel and coerce him into entering the tournament. After Daniel signs up for the tournament, he turns to Silver for guidance after Mr. Miyagi refuses to train him. Silver, acting on a request from Kreese to make Daniel's knuckles bleed, forces Daniel to destroy a wooden dummy using a self developed method he refers to as the Quicksilver Method which is intended both to inflict physical pain on Daniel but also give him an inflated sense of his abilities and progression.

After Daniel finally destroys the dummy and injures himself at the same time, Silver tells him that he is ready for the tournament. When Daniel and his friend Jessica Andrews are at a nightclub, Silver bribes a man into provoking a fight with Daniel, who punches the man and breaks his nose. Realizing that he has become a different man and has alienated himself from his friends, Daniel informs Silver that he will not fight at the tournament, causing Silver to reveal his true agenda and alliance with Barnes. As Daniel attempts to flee the dojo, Kreese and Barnes attack him. Mr. Miyagi then appears at the dojo to rescue Daniel, engaging Barnes, Kreese, and Silver in one-on-one fights. Though he puts up the strongest fight of the three, Silver is defeated by Miyagi, but continues to taunt him afterwards.

At the tournament, the committee organizers allow Silver to give a speech before the final match. Silver tells the audience that he will open a chain of Cobra Kai dojos where young people can learn "honesty, compassion, and fair play". When the fight begins, Silver and Kreese instruct Barnes to inflict pain on Daniel, by winning a point and subsequently losing a point to keep the score tied, leading to a sudden death round. The plan appears to work until Daniel unleashes his kata on Barnes during the sudden death round, defeating Barnes. After the final point is scored, Silver walks away in disgust as Cobra Kai shirts are discarded around him.

After the tournament, Silver hit rock bottom, his company went bankrupt from his illegal business deals in the 1980s, and he lost all his wealth. He also lost communication with Kreese. He questioned his past actions and realized that his and Kreese's views were wrong. He decided to change himself and received therapy to resolve his psychological issues. He invested in some start-up companies which helped rebuild his empire and put the world of Cobra Kai to rest. He moved to a gated beach community, became vegan, drank expensive wine and got a young girlfriend.

== Cobra Kai ==
Following his public defeat at the 1985 All Tournament and the subsequent collapse of his business in 1985, Silver entered a period of strategic dormancy. To rebuild his corporate standing, he adopted the persona of 'Terrance,' utilizing therapy and a 'Zen' lifestyle as a means of emotional regulation and professional rebranding. While maintaining a high-profile relationship with Cheyenne Hamidi and successfully rebuilding his fortune through firm investments, Silver lived a calculated lie. He pragmatically removed all physical traces of his association with Cobra Kai—including his signature tattoo—to pass corporate due diligence and insulate his new empire from his past 'insanity' until he was positioned to strike again.

=== Season 1 ===
While not seen directly, Silver is shown to have had a massive influence, as his, Kreese's, and Barnes's ruthless and unethical actions during the 1985 All-Valley Tournament led to the tournament committee issuing a lifetime ban on Cobra Kai from participating in the All-Valley. As he never met Silver or Barnes during his time as a student under Kreese, Johnny appeals the ban by acknowledging the problems of the previous Cobra Kai, promising that his new version of Cobra Kai is nothing like it and is dedicated to helping change kids' lives for the better. The committee agrees to reverse the ban, much to the chagrin of Daniel, who is also a member.

=== Season 2 ===
Silver is seen in archival footage, when Daniel tells his students a brief synopsis of his time reluctantly training with Silver due to Mike Barnes forcing him to compete in the 1985 All-Valley Tournament to defend his championship title (from The Karate Kid Part III).

=== Season 3 ===
A young Silver is seen in flashbacks during the time when he and Kreese were soldiers in the Vietnam War. After coming to an agreement with Johnny Lawrence and Daniel LaRusso to settle the fate of their dojos at the upcoming All-Valley Tournament, Kreese makes a phone call to Silver to enlist his help.

=== Season 4 ===
Silver rejects Kreese's initial request to rejoin Cobra Kai due to his resentment towards Kreese for abandoning him after their loss in the 1985 All-Valley Tournament. When Kreese crashes a party at Silver's beach house, he tells him that Johnny and Daniel have joined forces. Silver still refuses to help, admitting the absurdity of his scheme to seek revenge against Daniel in 1985. Silver tells Kreese that after Cobra Kai's loss at the 1985 All-Valley Tournament, he rebuilt his fortune and developed a calmer outlook. Silver is now in a relationship with Cheyenne Hamidi and is helping her to release a mindfulness app.

Kreese's reappearance in Silver's life causes him to regress back to his old ways. Convinced he cannot escape his past, Silver abandons Cheyenne and agrees to return to Cobra Kai, but tells Kreese they must avoid their previous mistakes. Following a confrontation between Cobra Kai and Miyagi-do/Eagle Fang, Kreese and Silver visit Miyagi-do so that Silver can reintroduce himself to Daniel and Johnny and to reaffirm their agreement to halt hostilities before the tournament. Although Silver tries to manipulate Daniel by "apologizing" for his past actions, Daniel forces the duo to leave. Insulted by Daniel's dismissiveness, Silver becomes more determined to win.

After training together at Cobra Kai, Kreese decides that Silver is attempting to undermine him with conflicting lessons. When Kreese reprimands Silver, he attempts to prove his loyalty by purchasing numerous properties for Cobra Kai's expansion. Convinced Kreese wants revenge against Johnny, he uses his son and Cobra Kai student Robby Keene to lure Johnny into a trap to brutalize him and demoralize Johnny's students. Kreese orders Silver to stop beating Johnny, causing Silver to get drunk. In his rage due to his disillusionment and resentment towards Kreese, he furiously and violently assaults Raymond "Stingray" Porter, a former adult Cobra Kai student. He then coerces Stingray to frame Kreese for his beating under the condition he will be able to rejoin Cobra Kai.

During the tournament, Silver and Kreese give conflicting instructions to their students, though they eventually win the tournament after Tory Nichols defeats Samantha LaRusso in the female division. He later announces that Cobra Kai will expand as a franchise all across the Valley. After the tournament, Tory overhears that Silver had paid off the referees to call the matches in Cobra Kai's favor. Later, while Silver and Kreese celebrate their victory at Silver's beach house, Silver proceeds to tell Kreese that his weakness is Johnny. Accusing Kreese of caring more about Johnny than restoring their friendship, Silver admits his own weakness for Kreese by pledging a life debt to him. Silver declares he is no longer in debt to Kreese and ends their friendship by having him framed for the attack on Stingray. As Kreese is apprehended by the police, he furiously swears revenge on Silver, who promises to recruit some "old friends" to teach at the new Cobra Kai dojos and to defeat Daniel and Johnny. With Kreese behind bars, Silver takes complete control of Cobra Kai.

=== Season 5 ===
Now in complete control of Cobra Kai, and with Kreese incarcerated, Silver begins expanding the dojo across the Valley. He buys out several local dojos while recruiting a group of new senseis from South Korea, including Kim Da-Eun, the granddaughter of Kim Sun-Yung who had created the style that had influenced Cobra Kai. Tory confronts Silver for bribing the referee at the All-Valley Tournament, but he maintains it was necessary to ensure Cobra Kai's success. Upon discovering that Daniel has recruited Chozen Toguchi and plots to take down Cobra Kai, Silver vows to retaliate. First, he has Mike Barnes' furniture store burned down after he attempts to help Daniel and Chozen find incriminating evidence against him. He then proceeds to form a rift between Daniel and Amanda by hosting a charity auction and manipulating Daniel into attacking him, straining their marriage. When Daniel tries to get Stingray (who was bribed by Silver) to turn against him, Silver gets into a fight with Daniel, in which he seriously injures and demoralizes the latter. Amanda eventually reconciles with Daniel after learning more of his history with Silver from her cousin Jessica Andrews. When Daniel and Johnny visit Kreese in prison, he reveals Silver's plan to get Cobra Kai into the Sekai Taikai, the most elite karate tournament in the world as part of his endgame for Cobra Kai to expand on a global scale. During the tournament round of the Sekai Taikai tryouts, Silver once again bribes the referee in Cobra Kai's favor and secretly teaches Kenny a lethally effective move to gain an advantage. Despite Cobra Kai winning the boys' round, Cobra Kai loses the girls' round after Tory abandons her match. Cobra Kai ultimately is let in, but Miyagi-Do and Eagle Fang also qualify.

Later, Terry and Kim have Tory punished and tortured for fleeing by making her use the 'Quicksilver' method on a stone dummy, making her right hand bleed (in a grim call-back to Silver training Daniel with a wooden dummy). Deciding Silver finally needs to be taken down, Johnny, Mike, and Chozen eventually decide to attack Silver by themselves, while the Eagle Fang and Miyagi-Do students, with help from Tory, hope to expose Silver to the Cobra Kai students by finding security footage of his assault on Stingray at the dojo, which Silver had covered his tracks by erasing. However, they manage to discover footage of Silver confessing to Tory about bribing the referee and upload it to the dojo's YouTube channel. In the ensuing fight at Silver's house, Barnes is knocked unconscious, with Johnny fighting off his henchmen, resulting in being pulverized until he rallies and defeats them with the help of a recovered Barnes, while Chozen defeats Silver in a fight to the death. However, while Chozen has his back turned, Silver heavily wounds him with a katana. Silver then makes his way to the dojo, but is too late to stop the footage of him and Tory's conversation being shown to his students. The revelation of the truth shakes Silver's students (and possibly Kim's) faith in him, causing him to go a manic spiral in front of everyone about how life is a competitive sport. Silver, still exhausted from his bout with Chozen, engages in a fight with Daniel who calls upon Silver's own training and finishes him off with a crane kick. Led by Kenny, the Cobra Kai students and Kim completely abandon Silver, throwing their Cobra Kai shirts on him while Stingray reverses his previous testimony to the police as he is taken away. With the evidence provided by both the students and Stingray, Silver faces a litany of criminal charges, while Cobra Kai faces an uncertain future.

=== Season 6 ===
Three months before the Sekai Taikai, Silver's lawyer gets the charges dropped due to Stingray's lack of credibility as a witness, but Silver's reputation is ruined and most of his fortune is gone, having been spent on his failed Cobra Kai franchise. At a karate club in Bangkok, he discovers Sensei Wolf, who has had his dojo taken away from him. Wanting to humiliate his enemies as revenge, Silver proposes that he participate in the Sekai Taikai and will return his dojo to him in exchange. In Barcelona, he recovers Dennis de Guzman, his former henchman, and has him kidnap Daniel, and when he escapes, he, Chozen, Kreese and Kim Da-Eun find Silver with Sensei Wolf, discovering that they are working together. When Kenny enters the Sekai Taikai, he offers him the chance to join his dojo, Iron Dragons, telling him that he owes nothing to his fellow Miyagi-do members, but he turns it down. When Cobra Kai is eliminated, Silver gives Daniel a file confirming that Mr. Miyagi killed his opponent when he entered the competition. At the hotel, Kreese, before leaving with Cobra Kai after being eliminated, attempts to confront Silver as he overhears him plotting a fight to humiliate Miyagi-do, regretting not being able to do so with Cobra Kai as well, though Cobra Kai is eventually reintroduced after the Russian dojo's expulsion. In the semi-finals, a fight breaks out between all the dojos and separately Kreese, with the intent of killing Silver, and Silver begins a fight in which Silver nearly kills Kreese when Johnny arrives and defeats Silver. The fight ends when Kwon Jae-Sung of Cobra Kai accidentally stabs himself in the chest and dies, leaving everyone watching in horror, including Silver.

After the Sekai Taikai is cancelled, Silver confronts Gunther to convince him to resume the tournament, to which Gunther says that it can only return if all the senseis agree. When Daniel refuses, Silver ambushes Johnny at LaRusso Auto under the guise of a test drive and pressures him to convince Daniel to change his mind, since he knows Johnny also wants the tournament to return. Silver and Johnny visit Daniel's house, where Silver reveals that he is dying and wants one last victory. In the match between Robby and Axel, Silver and Wolf pressure Axel to injure Robby to advance to the finals. When Miyagi-Do withdraws from the tournament, Silver assumes victory, only for Johnny to enter as Cobra Kai's sensei with Kreese's blessing, and with Miguel and Tory as captains, leaving Silver furious. Iron Dragons lose both finals, but as theirs and Cobra Kai's scores are tied, the tournament champion is decided in a match between the senseis. Silver tells Wolf not to waste his last chance. After the fight, Silver has a tense conversation with Johnny in front of his family in which he tells him that every decision has unintended consequences. On his yacht, unwilling to leave the final match to chance, Silver orders Dennis to kidnap Carmen and her daughter to sabotage Johnny, but Kreese, having snuck onto the yacht, kills Dennis by snapping his neck. Kreese witnessed Silver's conversations with Johnny after the fight and warns him against his plans to sabotage Johnny. Silver taunts Kreese for still being unable to shed his weakness, but Kreese argues that Johnny has always been a source of strength. He and Silver begin to fight. Silver subdues Kreese and prepares to kill him, but Kreese tosses his lit cigar into a pool of spilled gasoline near some gas canisters, causing the yacht to explode, killing them both and rendering all of Silver's plans in complete vain. As of the day of the final fight, Silver's fate was not yet publicly known, as Sensei Wolf wonders aloud about his whereabouts.

== Reception ==
The character of Terry Silver has received divisive responses from critics and fans alike, though his portrayal in Cobra Kai was received more positively, with Griffith's performance receiving major acclaim. Gene Ching writing for Den of Geek described Terry Silver in The Karate Kid Part III as a "cardboard cutout villain" and compared him to Steven Seagal’s performance as Nico Toscani in Above the Law. Brian Moylan of Men's Health described Terry Silver as a "cartoon of a rich dude" due to his luxury lifestyle and maniacal laugh, but felt that since reappearing in Cobra Kai, he had been written as less cartoonish despite continuing to use his money to get his own way.

== Commentary ==
John Kreese was initially intended to have a larger role in The Karate Kid III, but due to Martin Kove’s schedule conflicts with Hard Time on Planet Earth, the character of Terry Silver was written into the script. The Karate Kid III was Thomas Ian Griffith's first film. As a child, Griffith studied both acting and martial arts (Kenpo Karate and Tai Kwon Do), and prior to the film, he had performed on and off Broadway. Griffith states that when he was "cast for the Karate Kid role, my character wasn't supposed to do any martial arts at all...I just tortured Ralph, basically, and plotted his demise with Martin Kove". The narrative shifted after the fight choreographer learned of his background in martial arts. At the time he was cast, Griffith "figured the Terry Silver role was out of reach because he was 26 at the time and the character was a Vietnam War veteran about two decades his senior. And since Macchio, then 27, had to somehow play a convincing teenager, casting someone younger than him as Daniel’s older antagonist seemed simply insane. Griffith presumed he had a better shot of being cast as “Bad Boy” Mike Barnes, a karate champion who fights La Russo in the climactic scene".
