= No More Kings (album) =

Studio album by No More Kings
- Released: March 6, 2007
- Genre: Rock
- Length: 44:48 (US)
- Label: Astonish Records

No More Kings chronology
No More Kings (2007)	And the Flying Boombox (2009)

No More Kings is the debut album by Los Angeles rock band No More Kings. It was released March 6, 2007.

The album has produced two singles, "Michael (Jump In)", and the band's biggest hit "Sweep The Leg" that gained much praise for the accompanying music video, which featured many of the stars of the movie The Karate Kid. The video was directed by William Zabka who played Johnny Lawrence in the movie.

In early 2008, the album won in The 7th Annual Independent Music Awards for Best Pop/Rock Album.

== Track listing ==
1. "Zombie Me" – 3:29
2. "Sweep the Leg" – 3:17
3. "Michael (Jump In)" – 3:11
4. "Someday" – 2:57
5. "Grand Experiment" – 3:53
6. "Girl in the Sea" – 3:56
7. "Leaving Lilliput" – 4:19
8. "About Schroeder" – 1:58
9. "God Breathed" – 3:49
10. "Mr. B" – 3:21
11. "Old Man Walking" – 1:56
12. "Umbrella" – 4:31
13. "This" – 4:14

== Miscellaneous ==
- Front Man Pete Mitchell has called this album a "Thank you to the 80's"
- The record contains several references to various pop culture items. Subjects include The Karate Kid, Peanuts comic strip, Knight Rider, and Gulliver's Travels.
- The song Sweep The Leg was featured in the game MLB 08: The Show, and subsequently on the May edition of GameStop TV.
