= Dance Alone =

Dance Alone may refer to:

- Dance Alone (EP), by Logan Lynn, 2013
- "Dance Alone" (Sia and Kylie Minogue song), 2024
- "Dance Alone", a song by Blanks, 2020
- "Dance Alone", a song by Jana Burčeska representing Macedonia in the Eurovision Song Contest 2017
- "Dance Alone", a song by Keke Palmer from Keke Palmer, 2012
- "Dance Alone", a song by No More Kings from And the Flying Boombox, 2009
- "Dance Alone", a song by Tayla Parx from Coping Mechanisms, 2020

== See also ==
- "They Dance Alone", a 1988 song by Sting
