= No More Kings =

Pop rock band in Los Angeles

- Genre: Pop rock
- Years active: 2006–present
- Label: Astonish Records
- Members: Pete Mitchell; Adam DeGraide
- Past members: Neil DeGraide
- Website: www.nomorekings.com

No More Kings is a Los Angeles-based musical duo formed by singer/songwriter Pete Mitchell and producer/songwriter Neil DeGraide. No More Kings' music is known for its frequent references to figures in pop culture, most notably Johnny Lawrence from The Karate Kid, Michael and K.I.T.T. from Knight Rider, Johnny 5 from Short Circuit, and Dungeons & Dragons.

The name "No More Kings" comes from an episode of Schoolhouse Rock!, one of many of No More Kings' inspirations. The particular episode dealt with the Pilgrims leaving England, seeking freedom and independence.

Mitchell studied fine art in college and has worked for Disney and the Jim Henson Company; he is an accomplished animator and also speaks Japanese. He designed the interior album art for the band's first album as well as the album art and packaging for their second album. Mitchell claims his main sources of musical inspiration are the Beatles, Michael Jackson, Radiohead, Billy Joel, Beck, and Genesis.

== Music videos ==
=== Sweep the Leg ===
No More Kings received much of their exposure from their 2007 music video "Sweep the Leg", which incorporates elements of the 1984 film The Karate Kid and features appearances by nearly the entire original cast. Martin Kove reprises his role as John Kreese, and actors who played the Cobra Kai members in the 1984 film, Ron Thomas (Bobby), Rob Garrison (Tommy), and Tony O'Dell (Jimmy) are also part of the cast. William Zabka, who played Johnny Lawrence in the film, directed the video. Pat E. Johnson, who was the martial arts director for the film as well as the martial arts director for Bruce Lee, worked on this video. Dennis Haskins and Liza Snyder also make an appearance. "Sweep the Leg" was also featured on Sony's MLB 08: The Show.

The premise for the music video finds Zabka and members of his Cobra Kai gang living in a trailer in the desert, having become obsessed with the fight he lost years ago. He is haunted by No More Kings and chases Mitchell across the desert until they have a final showdown at the All Valley Under-18 Karate Championships. Johnny then claims victory, but after realizing it was a fantasy, he is run over by Ralph Macchio as Mitchell looks on.

The music video references not only The Karate Kid, but also the 1986 film Back to School (which also stars Zabka), the 1987 film Raising Arizona, and the 1984 video for The Cars song "You Might Think."

There are various versions of the video, the longest being a little over seven minutes. It was a collaboration between No More Kings’ record label Astonish Records, and Chapter Seven Films, a film company in Los Angeles.

"Sweep the Leg" received over 80,000 views within its first week of release and became the number one video on YouTube on March 16, 2007. It was featured on Myspace's most-viewed lists, earned nearly a million views on YouTube, and was mentioned on VH1's "Best Week Ever" online.

In 2008, Astonish Records released a special collector's edition CD/DVD.

=== Michael ===
In 2008, No More Kings followed up the video for "Sweep the Leg" with "Michael (Jump In)", which was animated by San Francisco animation company GhostBot. In "Michael (Jump In)", lead singer Pete Mitchell is a hero-wannabe who attempts to help people, but just makes things worse. The main character in the video is trying to be like Michael, from the show Knight Rider.

== History ==
Pete Mitchell and Neil DeGraide started No More Kings by themselves in the 1990s, and were later joined by Adam DeGraide (bass). They broke up in the late 1990s, but reformed in 2006, when Adam DeGraide started a record label called Astonish Records and signed them.

The band's self-titled debut album has a pop atmosphere and focuses on pop culture and literary references. Knight Rider, The Karate Kid, the Smurfs, Gulliver's Travels, characters from Peanuts, the Beastie Boys, Darth Vader, Fonzie, M.C. Hammer, Archie Bunker, Ghostbusters II, Adam and Eve, and Gene Kelly are all mentioned throughout the album. Well-known songs by the band include "Michael (Jump In)", "Sweep The Leg", and "Zombie Me". Lead singer Pete Mitchell described the album as "a thank-you letter to the 80s".

In early 2008, No More Kings won in The 7th Annual Independent Music Awards for Best Pop Album.

No More Kings' follow-up album, And The Flying Boombox (2009), presents quite a different atmosphere, but brings back the pop culture references including Vincent Barbarino from Welcome Back Kotter, Myspace, Dungeons & Dragons, Hollywood Squares, Lewis and Clark, Run-D.M.C., Butch Cassidy and the Sundance Kid, Short Circuit, and Merlin and Arthur from Arthurian legend. The album produced singles "Obey the Groove" and "Dance Alone."

III, produced in 2013 and released in 2014, is the third studio album by No More Kings. Following the release of several singles, the group published their third album, containing all their newer works plus a new song called "Tracy's Song". This album contained works such as "They're Coming To Get You Barbara" (a reference to the 1968 zombie film Night of the Living Dead), and the "Zombie Me Apocamix" a remix of their popular track from the first album.

Since the band's reformation, musicians are often added and interchanged according to tours and albums. Pete Mitchell is the band's lead singer and occasionally plays the guitar or piano for shows. Neil DeGraide, who produced their first three albums and played a majority of the instruments, is no longer an official member.

== Discography ==
- No More Kings (2007)
- And the Flying Boombox (2009)
- III (2014)
- Back (2024)
- Bored (2026)
