= Best Revenge (film) =

- Directed by: John Trent
- Screenplay by: David Rothberg; Rick Rosenthal; John Hunter (as Logan Danforth)
- Story by: David Rothberg
- Produced by: Michael M. Lebowitz
- Cinematography: John Coquillon
- Edited by: James Symons lban Streeter
- Music by: Keith Emerson
- Release date: 1984
- Country: Canada

Best Revenge is a 1984 Canadian film directed by John Trent from a story by David Rothberg. Originally entitled Misdeal the film was renamed following a delayed release. The film was panned for its similarity to Midnight Express.

== Cast ==
- John Heard as Charlie
- Levon Helm as Bo
- Alberta Watson as Dinah
- Stephen McHattie as Brett
- Moses Znaimer as Leo Ellis
- John Rhys-Davies as Mustapha
- Benjamin Gordan as Willy
- Hrant Alianak as Elliah
- Tim McCauley as Absolom
- Lorenzo Campos as Ahblon
- David Calderisi as Poker Player
- Michael Ironside as Dealer
- Angus MacInnes as Wayne
- Rob Garrison as Eddie
- Sean Sullivan as Paperman
- John Evans as Tommy
- S.J. Fellowes as Customer
