= Tony O'Dell =

American actor (born 1960)

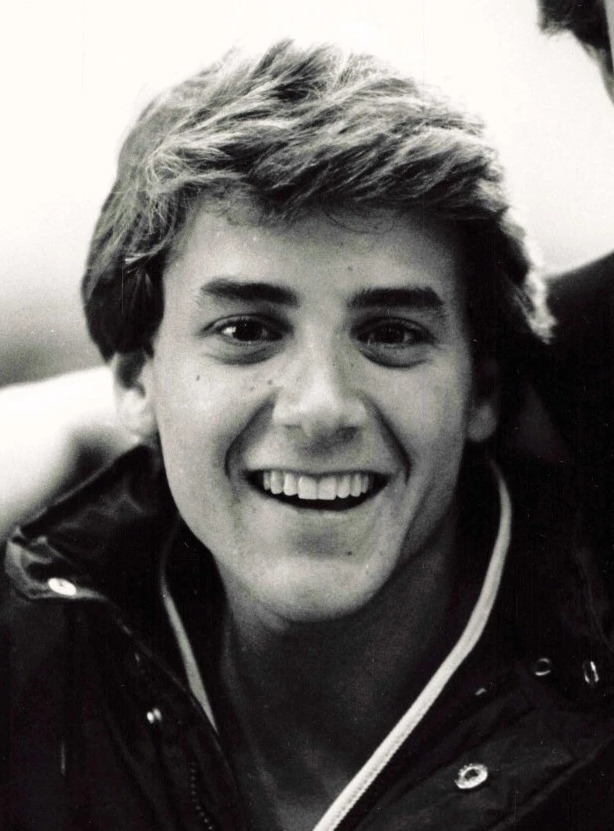
- O'Dell as Jimmy in The Karate Kid (1984)
- Born: Anthony Dell'Aquila; January 30, 1960 (age 66); Pasadena, California, U.S.
- Occupation: Actor
- Years active: 1978–present

Tony O'Dell (born Anthony Dell'Aquila; January 30, 1960) is an American actor. He is best known for his role as Cobra Kai member Jimmy in the 1984 film The Karate Kid, and the second season of its spinoff Cobra Kai, and as preppy Alan Pinkard on the ABC sitcom Head of the Class (1986–91).

== Early life and career ==
O'Dell was born Anthony Dell'Aquila in Pasadena, California and raised in Altadena. He graduated from St. Francis High School. His first television appearance was the 1978 Halloween episode of the NBC television series CHiPs, titled "Trick or Trick." He later appeared in the short lived 1985 CBS science fiction series Otherworld, as Trace Sterling. One of his longest roles was of high school student Alan Pinkard on the ABC sitcom Head of the Class (1986–91). He later appeared in Suddenly Susan, The George Lopez Show, and K.C. Undercover.

In 1984, he portrayed Cobra Kai member Jimmy, in the first two Karate Kid films, and appeared in the 2007 music video for the song Sweep the Leg by No More Kings as a caricature of himself and Jimmy from The Karate Kid. O'Dell reprised the role of Jimmy during the 2019 Season 2 YouTube web series Cobra Kai.

== Selected filmography ==
=== Movies ===
Year	Title	Role	Notes
1979	Good Luck, Miss Wyckoff	Student	
1980	Falling in Love Again	Donny Lewis (Present day)	
1981	Rivals	Student	
1983	Hadley's Rebellion	Dorm Boy	
1984	The Karate Kid	Jimmy	
1985	Evils of the Night	Billy	
1986	Chopping Mall	Ferdy Meisel	
1986	The Karate Kid Part II	Jimmy	

=== Television ===
Year	Title	Role	Notes
1978	CHiPs	Teenager	1 Episode, "Trick or Treat"
1979	Scooby-Doo and Scrappy-Doo	Additional Voices	
1980	Fridays	Boy (Uncredited)	1 Episode, "#1.2"
1980	Eight Is Enough	Scott	1 Episode, "Finally Grad Night"
1980	Family	Howard	1 Episode, "Letting Go"
1981	Dynasty	Christopher	4 Episodes
1981	ABC Weekend Specials	Tommy	1 Episode, "The Puppy Saves the Circus"
1982	The Scooby & Scrappy-Doo/Puppy Hour	Tommy	
1982	McClain's Law	Quinn	1 Episode, "From the Mouths of Babes"
1983	The Puppy's Further Adventures	Tommy	
1984	Lottery!		1 Episode, "Miami: Sharing"
1985	Otherworld	Trace Sterling	8 Episodes
1985	Simon & Simon	Jerry Carton	1 Episode, "Facets"
1986	Airwolf	Terry Haines	1 Episode, "Break-In at Santa Paula"
1986-1991	Head of the Class	Alan Pinkard	114 Episodes
1988	Murder, She Wrote	Larry McIver	1 Episode, "Snow White, Blood Red"
1996	In the House	Jonathan	1 Episode, "Home Again"
2000	Suddenly Susan	Bird (Uncredited)	1 Episode, "The Bird in the Wall"
2002-2003	George Lopez	Patrick / Delivery Guy	2 Episodes
2011	Shake It Up	Kelly	1 Episode, "Vatalihootsit It Up"
2015	K.C. Undercover	Mr. Hancock	1 Episode, "The Neighborhood Watchdogs"
2019	Cobra Kai	Jimmy	1 Episode
2021	Sydney to the Max	David	1 Episode, "Pie Hard"
