= Adam DeGraide =

American business executive

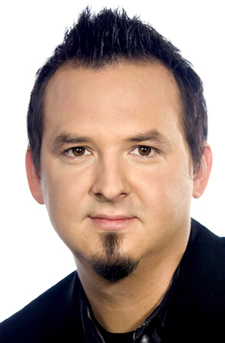
- Born: September 20, 1971 (age 55); Providence, Rhode Island, U.S.
- Occupations: CEO/Founder of Anthem Software; CEO/Founder of Crystal Clear Digital Marketing; Founder of Astonish Results; CEO/Founder of Astonish Records

Adam DeGraide (born September 20, 1971) is an American business executive in the digital marketing and entertainment industries. He is the co-founder of four software and digital marketing companies, an independent record label and an independent film company. He produced the movie short Most (2003), with William Zabka.

== Business career ==
=== BZ Results ===
In 1997, DeGraide started his first company, BZ Results, in Providence, Rhode Island. BZ is a digital marketing company assisting car dealers in Internet marketing. The company was acquired in 2006 by Automatic Data Processing for $125 million.

=== Astonish Entertainment ===
In May 2005 DeGraide founded Astonish Entertainment, also known as Astonish Records. He signed four rock artists: No More Kings with whom he used to play bass, Aranda, Soular, Dirt Poor Robins, and pop singer David Martin.

=== Astonish Results ===
In early 2006, DeGraide co-founded Astonish Results. The company provided digital marketing and training services for independent insurance agencies in the U.S. In 2011, Astonish Results received an undisclosed amount of equity investment from investor Serent Capital to further develop Astonish Results' growth, tools, and services. After being rebranded as Intygral in March 2015, the company was then acquired by Zywave in July 2015 and has since been absorbed.

=== Crystal Clear Digital Marketing ===
In 2013, DeGraide began his third software & digital marketing company, Crystal Clear Digital Marketing, in Orlando, Florida. Crystal Clear is a digital marketing company assisting the local healthcare provider in Internet Marketing. DeGraide successfully completed the sale of Crystal Clear to Patient Now in November 2020 and immediately went on to start his 4th software and marketing company Anthem Business Software, LLC dedicated to helping small businesses.

=== Anthem Software ===
After a 3rd successful business exit, DeGraide began his fourth software & digital marketing company, Anthem Software, in Orlando, Florida. Anthem is a software & digital marketing company assisting the local small business grow their business through business management software & digital marketing.

=== Elected Positions ===
Disabled Veterans Insurance Careers elected Adam DeGraide to its strategic board. In 2006, DeGraide launched Astonish, which was previously ranked 267th on the Inc. 500 list of fastest-growing private companies in the U.S. and served more than 7,000 insurance industry users.

== Music ==
DeGraide leads A.D.A.M. Music Project (AMP), a hard rock project from Jacksonville, Florida, whose songs draw on video games. He writes and produces the music with Dameon Aranda and plays guitar, bass and keyboards. The vocalists and other musicians change from song to song. The project released Punch Out, inspired by the video game Mike Tyson's Punch-Out!!, in 2025. Its 12-song album Knocked Down, based on the 1982 video game Pitfall!, followed on Astonish Entertainment in 2026.
