= Rob Garrison =

American actor (1960–2019)

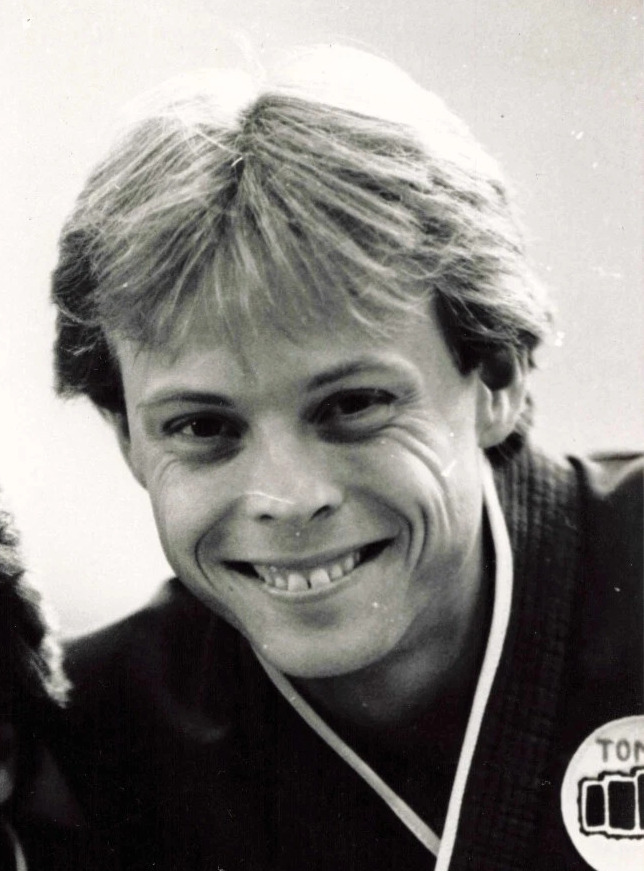
- Garrison as Tommy in The Karate Kid (1984)
- Born: January 23, 1960; Wheeling, West Virginia, U.S.
- Died: September 27, 2019 (aged 59); Wheeling, West Virginia, U.S.
- Education: Ohio University
- Years active: 1977–2019
- Known for: The Karate Kid; Cobra Kai

Robert Scott Garrison (January 23, 1960 – September 27, 2019) was an American actor known for his role as Tommy in the 1984 film The Karate Kid and the second season of its sequel show Cobra Kai.

Garrison started his acting career in the 1970s and continued steadily over the 1980s and 1990s. He acted in Brubaker (1980), The Karate Kid (1984), The Karate Kid Part II (1986), and Iron Eagle (1986). He also had roles in the television shows Coach, St. Elsewhere, MacGyver, and Kung Fu: The Legend Continues.

== Early life ==
Garrison was born on January 23, 1960, and raised in Wheeling, West Virginia.

== Career ==
He first became involved in acting at Wheeling Park High School and also had a small role in Starship Invasions (1977) before graduating in 1978. He then studied theater at Ohio University on a full scholarship, and received a small role as a convict in Robert Redford's prison film Brubaker (1980). After graduating from Ohio University in 1982, he was cast as Tommy in the 1984 film The Karate Kid, although both he and William Zabka tried out for the role of Johnny. Garrison reprised this role during season 2 of the Netflix web series Cobra Kai in 2019. His Karate Kid character Tommy is remembered for delivering the line "Get him a body bag, yeah!" during the closing moments of the climactic fight between Ralph Macchio's Daniel LaRusso and Zabka's Johnny Lawrence in the original Karate Kid film. He later stated that the line, heard while his character is offscreen, was not a part of the original script: "My famous line, I never said that while filming. I looped that in two months later. I was in the recording booth with John [Avildsen] and he said he needed two seconds of something. I said, 'Get him a body bag!' on the first try. John said 'That's going to be a classic. You'll never be forgotten because of that line.'"

Garrison continued his acting career over the 1980s and 1990s, appearing in films such as The Karate Kid Part II (cameo) (1986) and Iron Eagle (1986). He also had roles in the television shows Coach, St. Elsewhere, MacGyver and Kung Fu: The Legend Continues.

He acted in the 2007 No More Kings music video Sweep the Leg, which parodied The Karate Kid, The Pledge (2011), and the short film The Static released in 2016. Garrison interacted with his fans via social media and reprised the role of Tommy in the second season of Cobra Kai, which was his last performance. In that episode, his character dies, and Garrison himself died a few months later. A memorial tribute to Garrison preceded the credits in Cobra Kai season 3, episode 1, "Aftermath".

== Personal life ==
In a later part of Garrison's life, acting was no longer his full-time work and he was employed as a restaurant manager.

== Death ==
Garrison continued acting on stage in local theatre productions in Wheeling until his health began to fail him. He died on September 27, 2019, at the age of 59. He had been admitted to a West Virginia hospital for treatment of kidney and liver issues, where he had been hospitalized for a month until his organs shut down.

== Filmography ==
Film
Year	Title	Role	Notes
1977	Starship Invasions	Suicide Crewman	
1979	Search and Destroy	R.J.	
1979	Lost and Found	Ed Connally	
1980	Brubaker	Pretty Boy	
1984	The Karate Kid	Tommy	
1984	Best Revenge	Eddie	
1986	Iron Eagle	Packer	
1986	The Karate Kid Part II	Tommy	
1988	Human Error	Victor Harris	
1990	Hollywood Hot Tubs 2: Educating Crystal	Billy Dare	
2011	The Pledge	Pat Kern	
Television
Year	Title	Role	Notes
1986	St. Elsewhere	Bomber	1 episode
1987	MacGyver	Patrol Officer	1 episode
1988	Tour of Duty	Lt. Biggs	1 episode
1989	Columbo	Young Man	1 episode
1990	Coach	Insurance Salesman	1 episode
1995	Kung Fu: The Legend Continues	Sheriff Blaine	1 episode
2019	Cobra Kai	Tommy	1 episode (final acting role)
Music Video
Year	Title	Role	Notes
2007	Sweep the Leg	Tommy	by No More Kings
