= List of The Karate Kid and Cobra Kai characters =

This list of The Karate Kid and Cobra Kai characters reflects fictional characters from The Karate Kid franchise.

== Films ==
=== The Karate Kid (1984) ===
Character	Actor	Description
Daniel LaRusso	Ralph Macchio	The main protagonist of The Karate Kid franchise. He has recently moved to Los Angeles from his native New Jersey with his mother, Lucille, and takes up Karate with his Sensei, Mr. Miyagi, to defend himself from bullies. He returns as one of the main characters in Cobra Kai, where he and his wife, Amanda run a dealership called LaRusso Auto. He has two children: Samantha and Anthony. he gets back into Karate and eventually becomes friends with all of his main rivals from the 1980s, Johnny, Chozen and Mike. He appears again in Karate Kid: Legends, where he teams up with Mr. Han to help train a boy from New York named Li Fong.
Mr. Miyagi	Pat Morita, Brian Takahashi (young)	A karate master from Okinawa from the first four The Karate Kid films who served as a teacher for both Daniel LaRusso and Julie Pierce. Mr. Miyagi served in the US Army fighting in World War II before ending up as a maintenance man and later a karate master. In his later years, Mr. Miyagi formed a close friendship with Daniel's wife, Amanda, and became a grandfather figure to their two children, Samantha and Anthony, who he referred to as his grandchildren in letters written to Yukie. In Cobra Kai, it is revealed that he had died in 2011. Over the course of the show, he is mentioned numerous times (mainly by Daniel), is seen in photographs and newspaper clippings, appears through archival footage, and in Cobra Kai season 6, appears in Daniel's dreams. In Karate Kid: Legends, Mr. Han reveals to Daniel that he and Mr. Miyagi were good friends and shows Daniel a photo of them together.
Ali Mills	Elisabeth Shue	Daniel and Johnny's former high school girlfriend, and the cause of their rivalry. She appears in Cobra Kai season 3, where she recounts attending UCLA for college, going to medical school, marrying oncologist Gregory Schwarber, and having two children named Lucas and Ava. She also states that they are getting a divorce. During a dinner with Daniel, Johnny, and Amanda, she clarifies why she and Daniel broke up, and helps Daniel and Johnny resolve their differences.
Johnny Lawrence	William Zabka, Owen Stone (young), Thomas Parobek (young)	The secondary antagonist of The Karate Kid and one of the main protagonists of Cobra Kai. He was the top student of the Cobra Kai dojo back in the 1980s, a two-time defending champion of the All Valley Under-18 Karate Championships, and Daniel's high school rival, whom Daniel ultimately defeats in the All Valley. They meet again a few decades later in Cobra Kai. While he originally brings back Cobra Kai to help kids gain great strength and confidence, he later sees the negative effects John Kreese and the dojo's philosophy is having on many of his students. He quits being a Cobra Kai sensei in the season 2 finale, and opens his own dojo in season 3: Eagle Fang Karate. In season 6, he receives Cobra Kai back from Kreese and ultimately reforms it alongside Daniel. In Karate Kid: Legends, he appears at Miyagi-Do who scoffs at the idea of New York pizza being sent all the way to California, but than jokingly suggests they open up a pizzeria named Miyagi-Dough, much to Daniel's annoyance.
John Kreese	Martin Kove, Barrett Carnahan (young)	The main antagonist of The Karate Kid, and one of the two main antagonists (alongside Terry Silver) of Cobra Kai. Johnny's sensei and a co-founder of the Cobra Kai dojo. Served as a Special Forces veteran in the Vietnam War before opening the Cobra Kai dojo with his best friend, Terry Silver. He returns in the season 1 finale of Cobra Kai, and once again becomes the main Cobra Kai sensei in season 2. However, he loses control of the dojo in the season 4 finale when he is framed by Terry Silver, and is sent to prison throughout all of season 5. In season 6, after escaping from prison, he forms a new Cobra Kai dojo in South Korea alongside Kim Da-eun, the granddaughter of his original sensei. He ultimately regrets his actions after seeing the death of Kwon Jae-Sung, and, after handing Cobra Kai over to Johnny, sacrifices himself to stop Silver from kidnapping Johnny's wife and daughter.
Lucille LaRusso	Randee Heller	Daniel's mother, a widow, Amanda's mother-in-law and paternal grandmother of Samantha and Anthony. She was concerned with how Daniel was being harassed by Johnny and his gang. In The Karate Kid II, though she doesn't appear on-screen, she gets a new job in Fresno for the summer, but allows Daniel to stay with Mr. Miyagi. In The Karate Kid III, she briefly appears, having gone back to Newark to look after her brother-in-law, Louie Sr., who is ill. In Cobra Kai, she and Amanda have a troubled relationship that is later fixed by Lucille's granddaughter Samantha. In Cobra Kai season 6, she helps solve the mystery on Mr. Miyagi stealing the necklace revealing the necklace belonged to Mr. Miyagi's mother and a guard stole the necklace and Mr. Miyagi was fighting the guard to get it back, revealing Mr. Miyagi was never a thief. Mr. Miyagi gave the necklace to Lucille when he was dying to one day give it to Samantha, which she does as a graduation present.
Bobby Brown	Ron Thomas	A friend of Johnny; trained under John Kreese's dojo, Cobra Kai; he bullied Daniel along with his friends, but was more compassionate then the others and knew when things were going too far and pleaded to his friends Daniel had enough, only to be ignored; was later tasked to kick Daniel "out of commission" by injuring his knee at the Tournament, which Bobby deeply regretted doing as he wanted to fight Daniel fairly, and got disqualified from the Tournament as a result; he then quits Cobra Kai completely for his actions. In The Karate Kid II, after Kreese starts attacking Johnny, he tries to stop Kreese, but gets beaten up by him. In Cobra Kai season 2 and Cobra Kai season 3, he appears as a pastor; in the third season, he visits Robby in juvie while waiting for Johnny who made a promise to show up and visit his son in juvie, but when Johnny doesn't, Robby storms off and Bobby, annoyed, calls Johnny and scolds him for failing to show up. He later returns in Cobra Kai season 6 and officiates Johnny and Carmen's wedding before their daughter was born; Bobby also shares a friendly greeting with Daniel, showing that they retain no animosity for each other, indicating they likely made amends sometime between the events of The Karate Kid and Cobra Kai.
Tommy	Rob Garrison	A friend of Johnny and the third Cobra Kai member to be defeated by Daniel; he bullied Daniel along with his friends. In The Karate Kid II, after Kreese starts attacking Johnny, he tries to stop Kreese, but gets severely beaten up by him. In Cobra Kai season 2, Tommy has brain damage and is terminally ill, so Johnny, Bobby and Jimmy take him on one last camping trip together, Tommy then admits to Johnny that he too had a crush on Ali years ago. In the morning, Johnny, Bobby and Jimmy discover that Tommy died peacefully in his sleep. The actor died in 2019, not long after filming.
Jimmy	Tony O'Dell	A friend of Johnny and Cobra Kai student who's quiet and is the only brown belt in the group; he bullied Daniel along with his friends; he was a witness to Bobby injuring Daniel. In The Karate Kid II, after Kreese starts attacking Johnny, Jimmy is horrified. In Cobra Kai season 2, he is married with two sons.
Dutch	Chad McQueen	A friend of Johnny and a Cobra Kai student, he bullied Daniel along with his friends, but was much more aggressive towards Daniel than the others were, more so than Johnny who was the leader. At one point Dutch asked Johnny if he was going to beat Ali up for defending Daniel, hinting Dutch might be abusive towards women; he is the fourth person to be defeated by Daniel. In The Karate Kid II, after Kreese starts attacking Johnny for his second place win, Dutch doesn't attempt to try and save his friend and instead turns his back; this would be the last time Dutch is seen on-screen. In Cobra Kai season 2, Johnny refers to the fact that Dutch is in prison at the Lompoc Federal Penitentiary. Although McQueen had originally opted not to return to the series, he later expressed interest in doing so for season 6. However, injuries prevented him from appearing. He died in September 2024, after the release of the first part of season 6.
Darryl Vidal	Himself	The third-place winner of the All Valley Under-18 Karate Championships tournament. He is the only person to shake hands with Johnny. Vidal was described in Cobra Kai as a third-generation black belt. Vidal later appears as the referee of the Sekai Taikai finals in Cobra Kai season 6, much to Daniel and Johnny's surprise; he later angers the two men, as well as Tory, Miguel, and Sam while he upsets Shannon when he refuses to disqualify Axel who injured Robby's leg.
Freddy Fernandez	Israel Juarbe	Daniel's neighbor, whose invitation to a beach party for their high school led him to meet Ali. After Johnny beats Daniel up during the party, Freddy abandons him. Freddy is later seen at the All Valley Under-18 Karate Championships tournament cheering on Daniel, having made amends with Daniel. Although Freddy never makes another on-screen appearance after this, he continues to be close friends with Daniel, and in The Karate Kid III, his family was most likely still living at the apartment complex when they were forced to move after a new owner purchased the building. in Cobra Kai season 2, he allows Daniel to use his freezer at his butcher shop for training, Fernandez Meat Co., during a heatwave.
Susan	Juli Fields	Ali's best friend who dislikes Daniel, but her opinion later softens and is seen cheering for Daniel.
Barbara	Dana Andersen	Ali's friend who, like Susan, dislikes Daniel at first, but not nearly as harsh; her opinion softens and cheers him on later.
Chuck	Frank Burt Avalon	A friend of Freddy's who briefly befriends Daniel, but then abandons him after Daniel loses his fight to Johnny on the beach. Chuck is later seen at the All Valley Under-18 Karate Championships tournament cheering for Daniel.
Chicken Boy	Todd Lookinland	A teen in a chicken costume at the Halloween dance throwing eggs at people, including Daniel, which he and Ali both found amusing and laugh.
Mr. Mills	William Bassett	Ali's father who talks with his daughter about going out with Daniel instead of Johnny.
Mrs. Mills	Shannon Wilcox	Ali's mother who silently judged Daniel.
Mrs. Mills	Deborah May	30 years later in Cobra Kai season 3, Ali's mother disapproves of the fact that Ali is getting a divorce.
Mrs. Milo	Frances Bay	An elderly resident of Daniel's apartment complex who was also originally from New Jersey and owner of a dog; she tells Daniel to go back to New Jersey. She reappears in The Karate Kid III seen with her dog moving away after a new owner purchases the apartment complex forcing everybody residing there to move. In the first film, she was credited as Lady with Dog.
Mrs. Miyagi (photo)	Ann Oshita	Mr. Miyagi's late wife who died in the 1940s during World War II from pregnancy complications when she went into labour. Her photograph is seen in Mr. Miyagi's home on a table near his bed. Her photograph later appears in Cobra Kai season 5 when Daniel and Amanda explore Mr. Miyagi's bedroom, which has remained untouched since Mr. Miyagi's death.
The Referee	Pat E. Johnson	The referee in the first three The Karate Kid films. In the first film, he angrily orders the Cobra Kai students out of the locker room when he catches them harassing Daniel, but when Dutch takes one final jab at Daniel, he threatens to disqualify Dutch from the Tournament, so Dutch complies; he later tells Bobby he is disqualified after injuring Daniel's leg. In the second film, he congratulates Daniel on his win. In the third film, he deducts points from Mike Barnes for his flagrant rule violation and warns him to stop. As a member of the All Valley Karate Tournament committee, he would have had a hand in implementing the lifetime ban on Cobra Kai Dojo for the actions at the 1985 Tournament by Terry, Kreese, and Mike, a ban that would remain in effect for 30+ years until Cobra Kai season 1, where the current members of the committee reinstate Cobra Kai.
Jerry Robertson	Larry B. Scott	A student at the Cobra Kai dojo who is not a part of Johnny's gang. He was the first Cobra Kai member to be defeated by Daniel in the 1984 All Valley Under-18 Karate Championships tournament. In Cobra Kai season 6, Stevie, a man selling his home who eventually sells it to Johnny mentions to Johnny that he was friends with Jerry's younger brother.
Mr. Harris	Bernie Kuby	Daniel's history teacher. In Cobra Kai season 4, Daniel tells Miguel he once caught his mother and Mr. Harris on a date.
Soccer Coach	Peter Jason	The soccer coach who didn't see Bobby tripping Daniel intentionally, but did see Daniel fight back in retaliation and kicks Daniel out from soccer tryouts.
Yahoo #1	Larry Drake	Two bums on a beach who make insulting remarks about Mr. Miyagi and Daniel and refuse to remove their beer bottles off of Mr. Miyagi's truck until Mr. Miyagi uses a karate technique smashing them, scaring the bums away and removing their beer bottles off his truck.
Yahoo #2	Abott Alexander	Two bums on a beach who make insulting remarks about Mr. Miyagi and Daniel and refuse to remove their beer bottles off of Mr. Miyagi's truck until Mr. Miyagi uses a karate technique smashing them, scaring the bums away and removing their beer bottles off his truck.
Eddie	Scott Strader	A friend of Ali's who shakes hands with Daniel after she introduces them to each other. A deleted scene reveals he was a student in Cobra Kai defeated by Daniel in the 1984 All Valley Under-18 Karate Championships tournament.
Alan	Tom Fridley	A student at the Cobra Kai dojo who Kreese aggressively throws on the floor for not paying attention during lessons and forces Alan to do pushups on his knuckles.
Peter	Andrew Shue	A student at the Cobra Kai dojo. Peter was portrayed by Elisabeth Shue's brother.
The Ring Announcer	Bruce Malmuth	The announcer for the tournament in the first two Karate Kid films. In the first film, he has trouble pronouncing Miyagi-Do until Daniel corrects him. In the second film, he briefly appears seen congratulating Daniel on his win.
Tournament Attendees	Stanley Zabka and Nancy Zabka	A couple at the 1984 All Valley Under-18 Karate Championships tournament. They were portrayed by William Zabka's parents.
Judy	N/A	Daniel's first girlfriend whom he says goodbye to in the opening of the film as he and his mother leave New Jersey. A few decades later, Daniel tells Sam about her in Cobra Kai season 2.

=== The Karate Kid Part II (1986) ===
Ralph Macchio reprises his role as Daniel, and Pat Morita as "Mr. Miyagi" (referenced as Nariyoshi Miyagi) in this film. Karate Kid actor Martin Kove briefly appeared as John Kreese in the beginning of the film. Additionally, Karate Kid actors Rob Garrison (Tommy), Ron Thomas (Bobby Brown), Tony O'Dell (Jimmy), and William Zabka (Johnny Lawrence) were in the movie; minor characters, portrayed by Pat E. Johnson (The Referee) and Bruce Malmuth (The Ring Announcer) return as well.

Character	Actor	Description
Kumiko Tanaka	Tamlyn Tomita	Briefly has a relationship with Daniel during his visit to Okinawa. She and Daniel meet again a few decades later in Cobra Kai season 3, after she has become a professional dancer who once toured with a dance company. During this visit to Okinawa, she helps Daniel and Chozen resolve their decades-long rivalry, and reunites Daniel with Yuna. In Cobra Kai season 5, Chozen calls Kumiko leaving her a message that he is in love with her. In Cobra Kai season 6, she writes Chozen a letter saying she loves him as a friend only and she is in love with someone else.
Chozen Toguchi	Yuji Okumoto, Shigi Ohtsu (young)	The main antagonist for The Karate Kid Part II, and Daniel's rival. Chozen is Sato's nephew, and the top student of his dojo. He and Daniel meet again a few decades later in Cobra Kai season 3, where Chozen is now the sensei of Miyagi-Do in Okinawa. After Kumiko helps them resolve their differences and become friends, Chozen helps Daniel in his feud in Cobra Kai season 5 and Cobra Kai season 6. In season 5, he confesses his love for Kumiko and calls leaving her a message. In season 6, she writes him a letter telling him she loves him as a friend only and she's in love with someone else, leaving Chozen heartbroken; however, he eventually finds love, and starts dating former rival-turned-friend Kim Da-eun, who is now reformed.
Sato	Danny Kamekona, Akihiro Kitamura (young)	Chozen's uncle and Mr. Miyagi's former best friend. He was arranged to marry Yukie, but she had already fallen in love with Miyagi. In 1972, when he is training a young Chozen and American soldiers, he catches Chozen cheating and scolds and yells at Chozen, reducing Chozen to tears. Sato and Mr. Miyagi end up becoming friends again after Mr. Miyagi saves his life during the typhoon. In Cobra Kai season 3, it was revealed that before he died, he matured, was respectful towards Mr. Miyagi, made Tomi Village a tourist attraction and reformed Chozen.
Yukie	Nobu McCarthy	Mr. Miyagi's childhood girlfriend and Kumiko's aunt. Yukie and Sato were planned to marry each other, but Yukie in actuality loves Miyagi. This led to a death match between Sato and Miyagi, in which Miyagi decided to forfeit. In the third season of Cobra Kai, it is revealed that Yukie died and Kumiko had inherited her property.
Yuna	Traci Toguchi	A little girl who is nameless in the film and who lives at Tomi Village. Daniel rescues her from the bell tower during a typhoon. A few decades later in Cobra Kai season 3, she appears as Yuna, the senior vice president of sales for Doyona International, who speaks perfect English and saves Daniel's business.
Autograph Fan #1	Garth Johnson	Two young boys who ask Daniel for his autograph after Daniel won the Tournament. They tell Daniel they are from Reseda, making Daniel happy and he tells them he is from their too.
Autograph Fan #2	Brett Johnson	Two young boys who ask Daniel for his autograph after Daniel won the Tournament. They tell Daniel they are from Reseda, making Daniel happy and he tells them he is from their too.
Toshio	Joey Miyashima	Chozen's cronies who helped to torment Daniel.
Taro	Marc Hayashi	Chozen's cronies who helped to torment Daniel.
Miyagi Chōjun	Charlie Tanimoto	Miyagi's father; trained both Miyagi and Sato. He is dying due to his old age and Miyagi returns to Okinawa to see his dad in his final days. His final wish was for Miyagi and Sato to become close friends again and make peace, then he passes away in front of a saddened Miyagi, Sato, Daniel, Yukie, and Kumiko. The next day, his funeral is held with Miyagi, Daniel, Sato, Yukie, Kumiko and the Tomi Village residents in attendance.
Ichiro	Arsenio "Sonny" Trinidad	Old villager that lives in Tomi Village; witness to Daniel's first confrontation with Chozen when Chozen is exposed as a fraud.
Village Woman	Tsuruko Ohye	A villager who says hello to Mr. Miyagi and Mr. Miyagi tells Daniel that he remembers her from school.
Okinawan Boy	BD Wong	A friend of Kumiko's who tells her about a dance and suggests she invites Daniel to the dance.
G.I. Soldier	Clarence Gilyard	An American soldier on vacation in Okinawa who makes a bet on Daniel to break all six ice blocks.

=== The Karate Kid Part III (1989) ===
Ralph Macchio reprises his role as Daniel, and Pat Morita as "Mr. Miyagi" in this film. Karate Kid actors Randee Heller and Martin Kove reprised their roles as Lucille LaRusso and John Kreese in the film. Additionally, minor characters, portrayed by Pat E. Johnson (The Referee) and Frances Bay (Mrs. Milo) return as well.

Character	Actor	Description
Terry Silver	Thomas Ian Griffith, Nick Marini (young)	The main antagonist of The Karate Kid Part III, and one of the two main antagonists (alongside John Kreese) of Cobra Kai. Co-founded Cobra Kai with John Kreese, a war comrade and friend of his. He takes over the Cobra Kai dojo completely in the season 4 finale of Cobra Kai, and runs it throughout all of season 5 until he is defeated by the protagonists in the season finale. Afterwards, he becomes the manager of the Iron Dragons in season 6, hoping to get revenge on both Miyagi-Do and Cobra Kai. He attempts to kidnap Carmen and her daughter, but is blown up by Kreese in his yacht explosion.
Mike Barnes	Sean Kanan	The secondary antagonist of The Karate Kid Part III. Returns in Cobra Kai season 5 as a furniture store owner which is co-owned by him and his wife; the furniture store gets burned down by his former ally, Dennis, who is still working for Terry Silver. He eventually becomes an ally of Daniel, Chozen, and Johnny in both season 5 and Cobra Kai season 6.
Jessica Andrews	Robyn Lively	Came to work in her Aunt Pat's pottery shop (across the street from Daniel and Mr. Miyagi's shop) after Elizabeth-Anne Rooney ruined her relationship; spent time with Daniel LaRusso, but they decided to just be friends. Appeared in Cobra Kai season 5 as Amanda's maternal cousin (and Daniel and Amanda's matchmaker).
Snake	Jonathan Avildsen	One of Silver's henchmen who, along with Mike and Dennis, torments Daniel throughout The Karate Kid Part III . It is later revealed that he died some time before the events of Cobra Kai season 6.
Dennis de Guzman	William Christopher Ford	One of Silver's henchmen who, along with Snake and Mike, torments Daniel throughout The Karate Kid Part III. He later returns as a major antagonist in Cobra Kai season 6, where he once again works with Terry Silver, who at this point has become the manager of the Iron Dragons. He was later revealed to be the one who burned down the furniture store that was owned by his former ally, Mike Barnes. He's killed by John Kreese in the penultimate episode when Kreese snaps his neck before blowing up Silver's yacht in order to stop him from going after Johnny's family.
Uncle Louie (Louie LaRusso Sr.)	Joseph V. Perry	Daniel's uncle and Lucille's brother-in-law; becomes ill. Is revealed to be the father of Louie Jr. and Vanessa in Cobra Kai.
Milos Dadok	Jan Tříska	Terry Silver's Czech butler.
Margaret Spencer	Diana Webster	Terry Silver's English secretary.
The Announcer	Rick Hurst	Announcer of the All Valley Under-18 Karate Championships tournament in The Karate Kid Part III.
Rudy	Gabriel Jarret	A teenager at the downstairs dance club that Daniel and Jessica attend, and also attended by Terry. Terry secretly bribes Rudy to hit on Jessica and when he does, she rejects him while Daniel punches him in the face giving him a broken nose; Jessica storms off disgusted by Daniel's behaviour and Terry and Daniel flee the club, while bouncers remove Rudy from the club who complains about Terry not giving him his money as promised.
Glenn Medeiros	Himself	American singer performing at a downstairs dance club that Daniel and Jessica attend.

=== The Next Karate Kid (1994) ===
While Ralph Macchio does not appear as Daniel in this film, Pat Morita reprises his role as "Mr. Miyagi" (referred to as "Keisuke Miyagi").

Character	Actor	Description
Julie Pierce	Hilary Swank	Protagonist of The Next Karate Kid. Teenage girl who lost her parents, Susan and her unnamed father, now living with her paternal grandmother Louisa Pierce. As she is a frequent victim of bullying, Mr. Miyagi teaches her Karate to defend herself. She helps heal a female Hawk with a broken leg who she names Angel and when Julie goes to the monastery with Mr. Miyagi, she has Eric McGowen, her love interest, look after Angel; when Angel is fully recovered, she and Mr. Miyagi release Angel back into the wild. She attends prom with Eric, and later that night fights Ned, her bully, and manages to defeat him. Throughout Cobra Kai's run, there was speculation that Swank might reprise the role of Julie. According to Heald, they had a storyline involving Julie related to Mr. Miyagi and the mystery of a stolen necklace for Cobra Kai season 6, "but before we got too deep, we had to reach out to Hilary and find out would she be willing to come and play with us." At the end of the series in 2025, the creators stated that Swank would not appear as, "people have all sorts of reasons why they will or will not be participating in something, and with the timing of whatever was going on, it just was never an option." However, they also indicated that they will "have to see what might happen in this universe if we're fortunate enough to continue writing within it. She's a character that we have a lot of excitement to revisit."
Lieutenant Jack Pierce (photo)	NA	Julie's late grandfather, husband of Louisa Pierce, father of Julie's unnamed father, and Mr. Miyagi's military commander during World War II; both were in the 442nd Infantry Regiment (United States). Mr. Miyagi eventually taught Jack Pierce Karate as a message of thanks for saving his life. Pierce would eventually teach Karate to his son, who taught it to Julie.
Louisa Pierce	Constance Towers	Julie's grandmother, widow of Jack Pierce, mother of Julie's unnamed father. Mr. Miyagi sends her to Los Angeles to his home in order to give him time to bond with Julie, and help her cope with bullying, as well as the loss of her parents.
Colonel Dugan	Michael Ironside	Main antagonist of The Next Karate Kid. Leads a JROTC-style program, Alpha Elite, at Julie's school. After losing a fight to Mr. Miyagi, his students quit on him.
Eric McGowen	Chris Conrad	New student who joins Alpha Elite to someday be accepted into the Air Force Academy; Julie's love interest. He later quits Alpha Elite, not approving of Col. Dugan's training methods. Eric takes Julie to prom. Later that night he fights Ned, but gets defeated by him, so Julie steps in and manages to defeat Ned.
Ned	Michael Cavalieri	Secondary antagonist of The Next Karate Kid. Skilled academy student and gang leader of the Alpha Elite; fought Eric and Julie, with the latter defeating him; he then quits Alpha Elite due to Col. Dugan's abuse and losing his fight to Mr. Miyagi.
Charlie	Walton Goggins	Ned's friends; students of the Alpha Elite who later quit due to Col. Dugan's abuse.
Gabe	Tom O'Brien	Ned's friends; students of the Alpha Elite who later quit due to Col. Dugan's abuse.
Morgan	Thomas Downey	Ned's friends; students of the Alpha Elite who later quit due to Col. Dugan's abuse.
Abbot	Arsenio "Sonny" Trinidad	The monks. Abbot is the lead monk of the monastery. They are old friends with Mr. Miyagi. They briefly shun Julie when she tries to kill a cockroach as it goes against their beliefs in killing wildlife, but make amends with her when she gifts them with a praying mantis, and befriend her, and celebrate her birthday. They later visit Julie and Mr. Miyagi at Julie's grandmother's home and when Julie attends prom, Mr. Miyagi and the Monks go bowling where they do zen bowling, impressing the crowd at the bowling alley.
Tall Monk	Jim Ishida	
Monk	Rodney Kageyama	
Buddhist Monk	Seth Sakai	
Senator Daniel Inouye	Himself	Made a cameo giving the opening speech at Arlington National Cemetery for a commendation for Japanese-Americans who fought in the 442nd Regimental Combat Team during World War II.
Girl At Prom	Julie Weintraub	A girl attending prom who alerts everyone at the prom about the Alpha Elite bungee jumping in the gym. She's portrayed by the daughter of the late producer Jerry Weintraub, who produced The Karate Kid films.

=== The Karate Kid (2010) ===
This film is a remake of the 1984 original, set in China.

Character	Actor	Description
Dre Parker	Jaden Smith	Main protagonist of The Karate Kid. Goes into training for self-defense after being bullied; later wins in the Open Kung Fu Tournament. Moved from Detroit, Michigan, to Beijing, China. Also referred to as "Xiao Dre". Counterpart of Daniel LaRusso.
Mr. Han	Jackie Chan	Chinese maintenance man who becomes Dre's Shifu; lost his wife and son to a car crash. Counterpart and former prodigy of Mr. Miyagi. In Karate Kid: Legends, he becomes a successful shifu (master) of a large wuguan (kung fu school); he later visits his former student and great-nephew, Li Fong, who moved to New York with his mother and then visits Daniel LaRusso in The Valley where he reveals to Daniel he was friends with Mr. Miyagi and shows Daniel a photo of him and Mr. Miyagi together; Daniel later goes to New York to help Mr. Han train Li.
Sherry Parker	Taraji P. Henson	Mother of Dre Parker. Counterpart of Lucille LaRusso.
Cheng	Zhenwei Wang	Main antagonist of The Karate Kid; Dre's arch-rival; top student at the Fighting Dragon studio run by Master Li. Counterpart of Johnny Lawrence.
Meiying	Wenwen Han	Dre's love interest, violin player; her parents deem Dre to be a bad influence, but Dre rehearses a written apology to Meiying's father in which he asks for forgiveness. Counterpart of Ali Mills.
Liang	Shijia Lü	One of Cheng's friends, second-best student at the Fighting Dragons studio; disqualified due to injuring Dre's leg. Due to his disqualifying (as well as trying to stop Cheng from going too far in beating Dre up earlier in the film), he is the counterpart of Bobby Brown.
Master Li	Yu Rongguang	Overarching antagonist of The Karate Kid; Cheng's Kung Fu instructor; instructs Liang to deliver an illegal strike to Dre's leg. Counterpart of John Kreese.
Harry	Luke Carberry	An American who he and his family is also living in Beijing, and befriends Dre. Counterpart to Freddy Fernandez.
Music Instructor	Harry Van Gorkum	Meiying's English music teacher who resides in Beijing.

=== Karate Kid: Legends (2025) ===
This film features a storyline that is placed three years after the events of the final season of the series Cobra Kai (2018–2025). Ralph Macchio and Jackie Chan reprise their roles as Daniel LaRusso and Mr. Han, respectively. Pat Morita appears as Mr. Miyagi in an archival footage from The Karate Kid Part II (1986) at the beginning of the movie, and William Zabka appears in a cameo role reprising Johnny Lawrence at the end of the movie.

Character	Actor	Description
Li Fong	Ben Wang	A young Chinese immigrant boy in New York who is trained by Mr. Han, who trained Li at his school before Li and his mother moved. Li eventually reunites with Mr. Han when he arrives to New York to visit Li and later trains Li once more along with Daniel LaRusso; Daniel later gives Li a Miyagi-Do headband.
Victor Lipani	Joshua Jackson	Mia's father who is a former boxer and now owner of a local pizzeria who befriends Li, who also became his employee and decides to give boxing another try with Li training him.
Mia Lipani	Sadie Stanley	Victor's daughter, Li's friend and a love interest to both Li and Conor.
Dr. Fong	Ming-Na Wen	A medical doctor who is Li's mother, is initially reluctant of her son's martial arts practice after her oldest son (Li's older brother) was stabbed to death by thugs led by his defeated rival, fearing Li would get the same fate as his late brother's.
Conor Day	Aramis Knight	Li's nemesis, Mia's ex-boyfriend and a karate champion.
Ms. Morgan	Shaunette Renée Wilson	Li's school teacher.
Alan	Wyatt Oleff	Li's tutor and friend who lends him his own rooftop garden with pet pigeons as his makeshift training ground and convinces Mia to give Li a chance.
O'Shea	Tim Rozon	Conor's karate sensei and a loan shark who, like Kreese, uses underhanded tactics, and from whom Victor borrows money for his pizza parlor.

== Cobra Kai (2018–25) ==
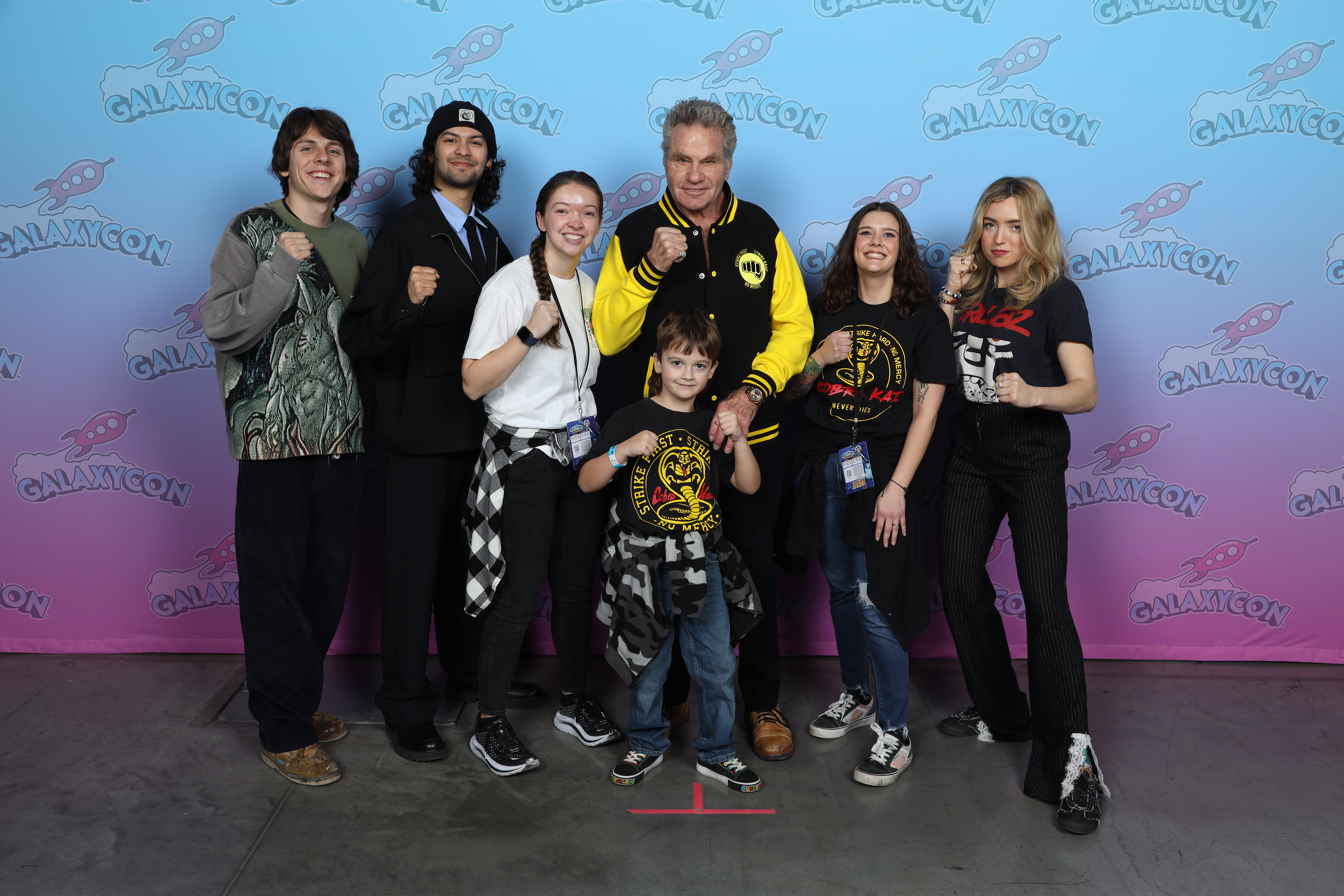
Jacob Bertrand, Xolo Maridueña, Martin Kove, Peyton List with 3 fans

Cobra Kai picks up 34 years after the original Karate Kid film. The following characters from The Karate Kid franchise return for the series: Daniel LaRusso, Johnny Lawrence, Lucille LaRusso, John Kreese, Bobby Brown, Tommy, Jimmy, Ali Mills, Mrs. Mills, Darryl Vidal, Kumiko, Chozen Toguchi, Yuna, Terry Silver, Mike Barnes, Jessica Andrews, and Dennis de Guzman.

While they don't physically appear, Mr. Miyagi and Sato have appeared in both archival footage and newly filmed flashback scenes and additionally, Mr. Miyagi appeared in a couple dream sequences. A few other characters that appear were in archival footage only, among them being Dutch, Freddy Fernandez, The Referee (from the first three films), The Ring Announcer (from first two films), Yukie, and Snake.

=== Cobra Kai: Season 1 (2018) introductions ===
Karate Kid actor Randee Heller reprised her role as Lucille LaRusso (Daniel's mother) in this season while Martin Kove reprised his role as John Kreese in the season finale.

Character	Actor	Description
Amanda LaRusso (née Steiner)	Courtney Henggeler	Daniel's wife and co-owner of LaRusso Auto Group, a chain of car dealerships; Samantha and Anthony's mother. At first, she is happy for Daniel after he re-discovers Karate, but later on, starts getting annoyed when he focuses more on Miyagi-Do then their dealership. After the school brawl, she decides to tell him to stop teaching Karate. In season 3, she later changes her mind and allows Daniel to re-open Miyagi-Do after Kreese's students attack Sam and the other Miyagi-Do students. In season 4, she tries to help Tory become a better person by getting her a therapist. In season 5, Terry Silver manages to successfully puts a strain on Daniel and Amanda's marriage making her temporarily leave with Samantha and Anthony and go back home to her mother in Ohio. Later in the season, it is revealed that she is the maternal cousin of Jessica Andrews, who set her up with Daniel. Amanda lets out her frustrations about Daniel's rivalries to Jessica, but when Terry is mentioned, Jessica is shocked by his return and tells Amanda how horrible Terry truly is. Amanda returns home to Daniel and supports him in his battle against Cobra Kai. In season 6, during Sam and Tory's fight for Captain of Sekai Taikai, she receives a phone call informing her of Tory's mother's death and tells Daniel to stop the fight because Tory is not in her right headspace. Later, she hosts a pizza party at her home for the Miyagi-Do students who are not competing form them to watch it live, but they are horrified when the all dojo-brawl breaks out and become saddened by Kwon's death. In the series finale, Amanda, along with the rest of her family, say goodbye to Samantha at the airport as she leaves for Okinawa to attend a student programme.
Miguel Diaz (Miggy)	Xolo Maridueña	The main protagonist of Cobra Kai. He is a 17-year-old Ecuadorian American teenager with asthma who, after an encounter with some bullies at the start of the series, becomes the first student in Johnny's Cobra Kai dojo. He later begins an on-off relationship with Samantha LaRusso, but as a result forms a rivalry with Robby Keene, Daniel's top Miyagi-Do student and Johnny's estranged son; After accusing Sam of cheating on him and accidentally hurting her in an attempt to attack Robby, Miguel and Sam break up. In the season 1 finale, he wins the 50th All-Valley tournament after defeating Robby in the finals. In season 2, after his first break up with Sam, he starts a new relationship by dating Tory Nichols, despite still having feelings for her. After Miguel discovers Hawk stole Mr. Miyagi's medal of honor, he fights Hawk, defeats him, and takes the medal back. He returns it to the LaRussos, but instead gives it to Robby who is living with them. During Moon's party, Sam gets drunk and learns that Miguel returned the medal, resulting in them kissing. Miguel is secretly happy the kiss happened, but is also conflicted and gently tells Sam he can't get back with her since he is with Tory. In the season 2 finale, during the school brawl, Miguel tries to stop Tory from hurting Sam, but ends up fighting Robby, who accidentally inflicts a potentially fatal spine injury and puts him in a coma. In season 3, after waking up from his coma, Miguel learns that he may never be able to walk again. He breaks up with Tory, and with Johnny’s help, relearns to walk. Miguel leaves Cobra Kai after John Kreese takes over and joins Johnny's new dojo, Eagle Fang Karate. He reconciles with Sam and the two resume their relationship after Robby breaks up with her. In season 4, he trains under both Daniel and Johnny, and participates in the 51st All-Valley tournament, but has to pull out in the semi-finals. In season 5, he travels to Mexico to find his father, Hector, but after learning how bad of a man Hector really is, leaves the country with Johnny, who went there to find him. He also reconciles with Robby after Johnny forces them to fight to help them put aside their differences. In season 6, he loses the match to become Miyagi-Do's male captain at the Sekai Taikai to Robby; later, after Johnny and Carmen marry, he and Robby become Miguel’s stepfather and stepbrother, respectively. Later that same day, Miguel's younger maternal half-sister, Laura, is born. After a series of events, Miguel returns to Cobra Kai under Johnny's leadership and wins the Sekai Taikai against Axel Kovačević. In the end of the series, Miguel decides to spend a few weeks with Sam in Okinawa before heading to Stanford university to start college.
Samantha “Sam” LaRusso	Mary Mouser; Reese TinLee (child)	Daniel and Amanda's teenage daughter who was taught karate by her father at a young age, and had a close relationship with Mr. Miyagi growing up and referred to him as grandfather. In season 1, Samantha has a relationship with Kyler Park, but breaks up with him after he tries to sexually assault her in the movie theater, and he in return spreads lies about Samantha around the school and turns her friends (including her best friend Aisha Robinson) against her, but Miguel Diaz, one of Kyler's victims to bullying, knows Kyler made up those lies about Sam and beats up Kyler and his friends, impressing Sam and later starts dating Miguel as a result, but breaks up with Miguel at the end of the season after he accidentally hit her when he thought she was cheating on him with Robby Keene when Miguel was trying to hit Robby instead. She starts a relationship with Robby Keene in season 2 and makes an enemy, Tory Nichols, who joins Cobra Kai and Miguel starts dating Tory after Sam kept shutting down all of Miguel's attempts to get back together; after getting drunk at Moon's party and found out Miguel returned Mr. Miyagi's medal of honor which Hawk stole (something Miguel didn't approve of Hawk doing), she kisses Miguel, which was witnessed by an angry Tory and results in the school brawl in the season 2 finale, ending with Robby knocking Miguel over the railing, resulting in Miguel going into a coma. In season 3, she is suspended after the school brawl for two weeks, then decides to restart Miyagi-Do, despite dealing with post-traumatic stress disorder; she also gets back together with Miguel after Robby catches them and mistakenly thought they were flirting, causing Robby to end his relationship with Sam. In Season 4, she trains under both Daniel and Johnny and though she is hesitate to learn Johnny's lessons at first such as jumping across on top of another building, she finally gives in after Johnny scolds her and the Miyagi-Do students for failing his lessons and when she successfully jumps to the other building, Johnny becomes proud of her and they form a close friendship afterwards; later, despite Daniel and Johnny's alliance ending due to a disagreement, Johnny still allows Sam to train with him, while also still training with her father, something Johnny is aware of, but not Daniel; she later loses the All-Valley tournament against her rival Tory in the season finale, with both her father and Johnny who made amends at the Tournament comforting her with Johnny assuring her she did a good job. In season 5, Sam experiences an identity crisis after losing and breaks up with Miguel, but gets back together with him in the season 5 finale. In season 6, she makes up with Tory, becoming friends and becomes Miyagi-Do's female Captain at the Sekai Taikai, but decides not to fight in the semi-finales after Axel injuries Robby's leg, something which Daniel and Johnny respect; in the series finale, Lucille, her paternal grandmother, gives her a necklace that once belonged to Mr. Miyagi's mother and then his wife; when Mr. Miyagi was dying, he gave the necklace to Lucille to give to Sam in the future when the time was right, and Lucille gives it to her as a graduation gift; she later says goodbye to her family and leaves the valley and starts a student programme in Okinawa, with Miguel deciding to spend a few weeks with her in Okinawa before he heads to Stanford university to start college
Anthony LaRusso	Griffin Santopietro	Daniel and Amanda's son and Samantha's younger brother. In season 1, he is spoiled and bratty and is rude to Johnny, who returns the favour back at him. In season 2, he is sent to summer camp where he becomes more active. In season 4, he is no longer bratty; he is peer pressured into bullying new student Kenny Payne; also, Daniel reveals to him when he was born, he tells Anthony that he was the only person to successfully land a kick on Mr. Miyagi when Mr. Miyagi held him as a baby, but Mr. Miyagi laughed it off and said Anthony was a kicker, which Anthony found amusing; later, after Daniel and Amanda find out he was bullying Kenny and was suspended, he was grounded and after Daniel catches him using an iPad, Daniel angrily breaks it in half, giving Anthony a wake up call and becomes better behaved after this. In season 5, he starts taking up Karate at Miyagi-Do to defend himself after Kenny, who joined Cobra Kai, starts bullying Anthony in return; he also forms a close relationship with his older sister; he later was the one to expose Terry Silver for bribing the tournament referee in Cobra Kai's favor by uploading the video which Demetri and Hawk started uploading originally before the Cobra Kai's attacked them. In season 6, he makes amends with Kenny, and they become friends; he also starts training with Johnny at Cobra Kai after Johnny gets Cobra Kai back from Kreese and Johnny tells Daniel his son has really improved in Karate, implying Johnny and Anthony are on good terms; he also says goodbye to Samantha at the airport and hugs her when she heads off to Okinawa for a student programme.
Louie LaRusso Jr	Bret Ernst	Daniel's cousin, son of Louie LaRusso Sr. and older brother of Vanessa LaRusso; works at LaRusso Auto and is close friends with fellow employee Anoush; torched Johnny's car with his biker buddies in revenge for defacing Daniel's billboard and disrespecting the family. In season 5, Louie and Johnny become civil and put the past behind them when Louie offers to take care of Johnny, Carmen, Daniel, Amanda and Chozen's night out for fun which Johnny agrees under the condition there is dancing as Carmen loves to dance, and Louie arranges it for everybody to head to a dance club; later, at the dance club, he angrily attacks Anoush after discovering he is dating his sister Vanessa, something that amuses Daniel and Johnny, but a short time later, Louie and Anoush make amends.
Anoush Norouzi	Dan Ahdoot	Is an employee at LaRusso Auto. Is close friends with Louie. In season 2, when he refuses to tell Johnny where Robby was currently living, Johnny angrily attacks him and Anoush confesses Roby is living with the LaRusso's; he later quits LaRusso Auto to work for Tom Cole, a rival dealership, when Daniel fails to show up to a meeting there were supposed to have. In season 3, he quits working for Tom Cole when Tom tries to buy out LaRusso Auto after the school fight and he is re-hired at LaRusso Auto after Daniel's friends from Okinawa, Kumiko and Yuna, save the business. In season 5, he enters a relationship with Louie's sister and Daniel's cousin, Vanessa LaRusso, something that angered Louie at first and attacked Anoush, but later that night make amends.
Carmen Diaz	Vanessa Rubio	Miguel's mother and Hector's ex-wife; dated a man named Graham, who did not have good intentions with her; later on she starts a relationship with Johnny in season 2 and becomes good friends with Daniel and Amanda; after the school brawl and Miguel ends up in a coma, she angrily tells Johnny to stay out of her life. In season 3, she makes amends with Johnny when Johnny helps Miguel to walk again and resume their relationship. In season 4, after Miguel heads off to Mexico to find his father, she is upset and reveals to Johnny that Miguel's father does not know who his own son is; in season 5, Johnny and Robby go to Mexico and manage to bring Miguel back safely; shortly after Miguel returns home, she finds out she's pregnant with Johnny's baby. In season 6, she and Johnny get married at the hospital, which is officiated by Johnny's high school friend Bobby Brown, and she becomes Robby's stepmother and later that same day, their daughter is born, who they name Laura after Johnny's late mother.
Rosa Diaz (Yaya)	Rose Bianco	Miguel and Laura's maternal grandmother and Carmen's mother; later becomes Johnny's mother-in-law and Robby's step grandmother. She likes Johnny and openly despises her ex son-in-law, Hector. She becomes good friends with Daniel and Amanda and also befriends Daniel's mother, Lucille. She likes to smoke marijuana.
Robert Swayze "Robby" Keene	Tanner Buchanan	Johnny's estranged teenage son and son of Shannon Kenne, who loves her son, but is an alcoholic; he becomes Daniel's first and top student in Miyagi-Do, thus forming a rivalry with Miguel Diaz, Johnny's top Cobra Kai student. Robby drops out of school and starts working for Daniel at LaRusso Auto and also starts learning Karate; after Daniel learns Robby is Johnny's son, Daniel banishes him from Miyagi-Do, so Robby enters the 50th All-Valley tournament without a dojo or Sensei; after Hawk injuries Robby, which upsets Johnny and scolds Hawk for doing such a thing, Robby makes amends with Daniel after Daniel offers to be his Sensei for Miyagi-Do, which Robby accepts, he heals in time for the final match fights against Miguel, but loses in the season 1 finale. In season 2, after Shannon abandons him for a trip to Mexico, resulting in the rent falling behind and the power to his apartment shut off, Daniel and Sam discover his living conditions and he and Amanda let Robby move in with them; he also starts a relationship with Samantha LaRusso, and later Shannon shows up to The LaRusso's, full with regret and tells Robby she is getting help by going to rehab and promises to become a better mother; later, after Sam kisses Miguel while drunk at Moon's party, Robby was going to take Sam home, but Sam begs him to take her somewhere else, so he takes her to Johnny's apartment, which Daniel discovers the next day and angrily drops Robby as a Miyagi-Do student; the next day, during the school brawl, he learns Sam cheated, but decides to stop Tory from hurting Sam until Miguel attacks Robby, resulting in them fighting; the brawl ends when he accidentally cripples Miguel at the end of the school brawl; as consequence, he is expelled from West Valley High school but is allowed to return to the school in season six. After a series of misunderstandings and his time in juvie in season 3, he betrays Miyagi-Do and joins Cobra Kai (now under the tutelage of John Kreese) and permanently ends his relationship with Sam when he attempted to reconcile with her, only to see her flirting with Miguel. He becomes its new top student in season 4 and starts to train Kenny Payne, but loses the 51th All-Valley finale against Hawk; he also begins an on-off relationship with former rival-turned-friend, Tory Nichols. Robby eventually sees the error of his ways and rejoins Miyagi-Do (who at this point has formed an alliance with Johnny's Eagle Fang dojo) in season 5, and in the process makes amends with his father, Daniel, Samantha, Miguel, and Hawk. In season 6, he becomes Myagi-Do's Co-Captain for the Sekai Taikai, after beating Miguel in a deciding match; he and Miguel become stepbrothers after Johnny and Carmen marry, with Robby becoming Carmen's stepson and later that same day, Robby's younger paternal half-sister, Laura, is born; at the Sekai Taikai, he gets injured during the semi-finals by Axel Kovačević and decides to no longer fight, with Miguel taking his place who manages to defeat Axel; in the series finale, Robby and Tory get a job offer to promote Karate, which they accept.
Shannon Keene	Diora Baird	Johnny's ex-girlfriend and Robby's mother, an alcoholic. She despises Johnny for abandoning her and Robby from Day 1 when she went into labor with Robby, not aware that his mother's recent death who died a few days before her grandson's birth has messed up Johnny emotionally. Though she loves Robby, she frequently leaves him alone to fend for himself while she goes out for dates and drinks. In season 2, after going to Mexico, she realizes she's been failing Robby and with Daniel and Amanda's help, who she becomes good friends with, makes the decision to get help and goes into rehab; she has been sober since. In season 5, she makes peace with Johnny and they become civil and is happy Johnny is slowly changing his life around for the better and allows Robby to stay with his dad. In season 6, she ends up in a relationship with a man named Jace, a friendly man who is very caring and willing to help Robby with his future career; later, she is upset when Axel injuries Robby's leg and along with Johnny, they comfort Robby where they both tell their son they love him and will always be proud of him.
Sid Weinberg	Ed Asner; Michael H. Cole (Young)	Johnny Lawrence's abusive stepfather and a retired film producer. He gives Johnny a check as a way to break off the relationship, which Johnny later uses to fund Cobra Kai; later, after Cobra Kai becomes a success, he returns the money to Sid telling Sid he never needed his money. In season 3, Sid refuses to help pay for Miguel's surgery to walk again, so Johnny steals an expensive sculpture while leaving Sid's home which Johnny pawns and pays for the surgery. In season 6, Johnny receives his late mother's wedding ring from Sid so Johnny can marry Carmen and Johnny admits that Sid is getting soft in his old age. Asner died in 2021 before the completion of the series.
Laura Lawrence	Candace Moon	Johnny Lawrence's mother and Robby's grandmother. Died in 2002, mere days before Robby's birth. Her death greatly affects Johnny - making him feel even more alienated and depressed, which worsened his drinking and reckless behaviors.
Eli "Hawk" Moskowitz	Jacob Bertrand	Demetri's best friend and one of Miguel's high school friends. He is often bullied for his cleft lip which leads to him joining Cobra Kai, where he takes on the moniker of Hawk and develops a more aggressive personality. While he originally joined Cobra Kai to gain some confidence and stand up to his bullies, he gets easily influenced by John Kreese's "No Mercy" lifestyle, that it leads to him becoming an even worse bully and a major antagonist in seasons 2 and 3, including stealing Mr. Miyagi's medal of honor, which angers his close friend and fellow Cobra Kai student Miguel Diaz and when Hawk refuses to return the medal, Miguel fights Hawk, gets the medal away from him and Miguel returns the medal back to The LaRusso's; Hawk also ends up in a relationship with Moon, but she breaks up with him after learning he beat up Demetri; Hawk makes several attempts to win Moon back, including flirting with a girl named Piper Elswith to make Moon jealous, only to discover Piper is a lesbian and Moon, who is bisexual, are in a relationship together; despite making more attempts to win Moon back, including winking at her on the soccer course, she simply ignores him; he eventually realizes just how far he has fallen and switches sides to Miyagi-Do and Eagle Fang in the season 3 finale, making amends with his friend Demetri and everyone else he hurt. In season 4, after the Cobra Kai's shave his mohawk off as revenge for betraying them, Hawk briefly quits Karate, but with Demetri's encouragement, Hawk eventually goes back, but joins Miyagi-Do instead of Johnny's Eagle Fang and tells Daniel he doesn't mind being called either Eli or Hawk and he gets back together with Moon, and in the 51st All Valley Karate Tournament, wins the tournament for the boys division. In season 6, he re-grows his mohawk; his friendship with Demetri briefly becomes strained once more when Hawk didn't apply to MIT, but at Sekai Taikai, eventually make amends and in the series finale, he, along with Demetri, goes to Caltech after Demetri turns down MIT.
Aisha Robinson	Nichole Brown	Samantha LaRusso's best childhood friend, who is bullied by high school classmates. She becomes the first student after Miguel to join Cobra Kai and also the very first female student to officially join Cobra Kai ever since the dojo was first founded by Kreese and Silver in the 1970s, and she befriends Miguel. Briefly shuns Samantha when Samantha doesn't defend her from the bullies, but they eventually make amends. She becomes friends with one of her former bullies, Moon Taylor, who saw the errors of her ways and she apologized to Aisha who accepted, but also gets revenge on another one of her bullies, Yasmine, by giving her a front wedgie when Yasmine refuses to apologize at Moon's suggestion, humiliating her in front of everyone. In season 2, she befriends new student, Tory Nichols, the only other female student to be in Cobra Kai at the time; she later tells Samantha that Miguel returned Mr. Miyagi's medal of honour, something Samantha didn't know; after the school fight breaks out, she tries to stop Tory from attacking Samantha, but when a boy who isn't part of either dojo hits her, Aisha angrily punches him in retaliation and becomes part of the school fight; she later transfers out of the high school after the school brawl. She later returns in season 4 when Sam surprises her with a visit to her new home Santa Barbara; Aisha gives Sam advice on trying to make amends with Tory.
Demetri Alexopoulos	Gianni DeCenzo	An intelligent, nerdy, and socially awkward outcast who is Hawk's childhood best friend and a member of Miguel's high school friend group. After Hawk starts dating Moon, Demetri becomes friends with Moon; he goes on to join Miyagi-Do in season 2, after Hawk's violent personality change causes a massive drift between the two, and after Moon learns Hawk attacked Demetri, Moon breaks up with Hawk. While originally a big whiner, he gains confidence throughout his time in Miyagi-Do and even gets together with Yasmine, the girl of his dreams, in season 3, who previously bullied Demetri, but after Kyler humiliated Demetri in front of the school by drawing a giant penis on Demetri's arm cast, Yasmine signs his arm cast and counter-graffiti's it; one time, Samantha and Miguel caught Demetri and Yasmine making out and both embarrassed they were caught, quickly deny to Sam and Miguel they are in a relationship, much to Sam and Miguel's amusement. Although he is not the strongest fighter among the new generation of karate students, his fighting skills have greatly improved throughout the series to the point where he makes it to the top four at the 51st All-Valley Karate Tournament (Boys Division) in the season 4 finale. In season 6, he is accepted into MIT, but turns down the offer to join Hawk at Caltech; at Sekai Taikai, Yasmine breaks up with him after Hawk unintentionally showed Yasmine and Moon Demetri dancing with another girl, Maria from Spanish dojo Furia de Pantera via Zoom, but Yasmine later forgives him when he makes it up to her.
Isaiah Robinson	Chris Mason	Aisha's father and Sandra's husband. Is a former football player who played for the Los Angeles Chargers and is good friends with Daniel and Amanda.
Bert	Owen Morgan	A diminutive junior student of Cobra Kai who is later kicked out by John Kreese in season 3, which leads to him joining Eagle Fang Karate. He never scored any points in any of the Karate Tournaments he competed in due to always fighting people who were much taller than him. He is close friends with Nate.
Kyler Park	Joe Seo	The main antagonist of season 1, a major antagonist in seasons 3–5, and a minor protagonist in season 6. He is a high school bully who frequently bullies Miguel, Demetri and Hawk and comes from a wealthy Korean American family who is Sam's first boyfriend in the series. He officially joins Cobra Kai in season 3 after it is taken over by John Kreese (and later Terry Silver), becoming an even bigger bully and remains loyal to the dojo until the season 5 finale. In season 6, he is seen attending college and has become a better person and much more friendly, and makes amends with Miguel, becoming friends after Miguel helps Kyler take down Zenker, president of the fraternity who put Kyler through a cruel hazing. After humiliating Zenker and his frat brothers, he was given a free pass to join a rival Fraternity, no strings attached.
Brucks	Bo Mitchell	A high school bully and friend of Kyler. In season 3, he attempts to join Cobra Kai, but Hawk, one of his former victims of bullying, very aggressively beats him up so badly, he's bleeding and crying in pain, resulting in him never trying to join a Karate dojo again. He later reappears in season 6, all healed and attending college, he is now friendly and forgives Hawk.
Moon Taylor	Hannah Kepple	One of Sam's friends and Hawk's girlfriend at West Valley High. Originally a bully, she sees the errors of her ways and apologizes to those she bullied, including Aisha Robinson who accepts Moon's apology and become friends. She is a bisexual pacifist who does not condone violence, and even attempts to ease the tension between the Cobra Kai and Miyagi-Do students in season 2, to no avail, and during the school fight after begging everyone to stop, she flees in terror after two students fighting nearly collide into her. Her and Hawk originally got together near the end of season 1, before breaking up halfway through season 2. She later gets a girlfriend named Piper by the end of season 2, before ultimately getting back together with a reformed Hawk in season 4. In season 3, she and the cheerleading squad help Sam and the Miyagi-Do students with a car cash to raise money for Miguel's surgery for him to walk again. She is the daughter of Winnie Taylor and has an older sister named Sage.
Yasmine	Annalisa Cochrane	One of Sam's friends and Moon's best friend. She is the leader of the rich girl clique at West Valley High, and is very antagonistic towards the protagonists throughout all of season 1. However, after getting humiliated by Aisha and developing romantic feelings for Demetri, she becomes a better person, and even counter-graffiti's Demetri's arm cast after Kyler drew a penis on it; she and Demetri are later caught by Samantha and Miguel making out and both embarrassed they were caught, quickly deny to Sam and Miguel they are in a relationship, much to Sam and Miguel's amusement. While she isn't officially a member of any dojo, she still supports Miyagi-Do as it is the dojo her boyfriend Demetri is in. Though, her and Demetri eventually break up in season 6. In the series finale, Demetri and Yasmine reconcile their relationship before Demetri leaves for college.
Rory	Dawson Towery	Friends of Kyler and Brucks who beat up and bully Miguel, Hawk, and Demetri. After Miguel gets revenge beating them up along with Kyler and Brucks, Rory and A.J. aren't seen again.
A.J.	Jonathan Mercedes	Friends of Kyler and Brucks who beat up and bully Miguel, Hawk, and Demetri. After Miguel gets revenge beating them up along with Kyler and Brucks, Rory and A.J. aren't seen again.
Lynn ("Homeless Lynn")	Susan Gallagher	Homeless woman who hangs around the strip mall. She frequently enjoys hassling Johnny.
Sheila	Kwajalyn Brown	An employee at LaRusso Auto. In season 4, she is revealed to have a young daughter named Cindee that Samantha used to babysit for; Sheila, Cindee, The LaRusso family and Miguel are at a birthday party place for Cindee's birthday while Tory is working there as an entertainer.
Tom Cole	David Shatraw	Owner of Cole's Autos on Van Nuys, a rival automotive dealership. In season 1, after Johnny vandalizes Daniel's billboard with a penis, Tom orders LaRusso Auto staff sausages for lunch, angering Daniel and he confronts Tom, even kicking his bobo drink out of his hands, stunning Tom and his staff. In season 2, though offscreen, a few LaRusso Auto staff quit to work for Tom, including Anoush. In season 3, following the school brawl, he tries to buy out LaRusso Auto which is failing, but Anoush turns on Tom and says Daniel and Amanda would never sell the business, quits working for Tom and he is re-hired by the LaRusso's; eventually, Daniel's friends from Okinawa, Kumiko and Yuna, save LaRusso Auto. Tom has not been seen since LaRusso Auto was saved.
Rhonda	Carole Kaboya	Sid's caregiver, who is a target of Sid's verbal abuse.
Lyle	Matt Borlenghi	Owner of the Pawn Shop at the strip mall. Gets very easily annoyed with Johnny whenever Johnny visits his store. In season 6, his opinion on Johnny softens and cheers for Johnny while watching the Sekai Taikai at a bar.
Nestor	Vas Sanchez	The owner of the convenience store at the strip mall. Is very friendly to his customers unless they annoy him. He cheers for Johnny while watching the Sekai Taikai at a bar.
Armand Zarkarian	Ken Davitian	Armenian American real estate tycoon. Daniel trying to shut down Cobra Kai, convinces him to raise the rent, which he does, but it also results in the rent being raised for the other businesses at the strip mall as well, including Lyle's Pawn shop and Nestor's convenience store. In season 2, when Kreese steals Cobra Kai from Johnny, Kreese tells Johnny that Armand never liked Johnny. In season 3, after Amanda learns how truly horrible Cobra Kai is, she and Daniel get Armand to kick Kreese out, but Kreese beats him up and Armand backs out of Daniel and Amanda's deal and this is Armand's final appearance. In season 6, Daniel makes a deal with Armand to get the dojo back for Johnny, making Johnny grateful.
Roland Zakarian	Alex Huff	Armand's son.
Cruz and Trey	Jeff Kaplan & Terayle Hill (respectively)	Robby's former friends who spend their time committing petty theft; both were sent to jail by the start of Season 3.
Daryl	Keith Arthur Bolden	African American member of the All Valley Committee; announcer for the 2018 and 2019 All Valley Under-18 Karate Championships. In season 6, he had a brief rivalry with Gunther over who would be master of ceremonies at the Sekai Taikai being held at All Valley Sports Arena, with Gunther winning the rights to announce after he knocked Daryl down with a single kick; he and Gunther later make peace when the final match takes place between Johnny and Wolf and Gunther lets Daryl announce the final round.
Ron	Matt Lewis	President of the All Valley Committee; invites pop star Carrie Underwood as a guest performer for the All-Valley tournament before the qualifying matches. He leaves the committee after season 4 and isn't seen again.
Sue	Cara AnnMarie	Only female member of the All Valley Committee; she has a small rivalry with George who thinks he's sexist.
George	Kurt Yue	Asian American member of the All Valley Committee; close friend of Daniel and has a small rivalry with Sue who thinks he's sexist.
Xander Stone	Tallinn Chat	Represents Topanga Karate; 2017 All Valley Under-18 Karate Champion.
Patricia Stone	Suehyla El-Attar	Xander's mother.
Mrs. Jenkins	Linda Boston	Vice-Principal of North Hills High School.
Mr. Palmer	Dustin Lewis	Science teacher at West Valley High School. In season 2, after witnessing a fellow teacher attempting to stop the school fight gets flipped over by Cobra Kai student Doug Rickenberger, he refuses to get involved and flees the scene.
Counselor Blatt	Erin Bradley Dangar	A counselor at West Valley High School, and former high school classmate of Daniel. She is Susan's (The Karate Kid) younger sister.
Judy	Kylie Delre	A rich woman who causes Johnny to lose his job after an argument. They later meet accidentally through a dating app.
Gregory Schwarber (photo)	NA	Ali's husband who she has two children with named Lucas and Ava; Daniel shows a photo of Gregory to Johnny from Ali's Facebook. In season 3, Ali tells Johnny and Daniel she and Gregory are getting divorced and she has gone back to her maiden name.
Edwin	A.J. Hicks	Cobra Kai student. He permanently quits Cobra Kai after Terry Silver's cheating is exposed and joins Miyagi-Do in season 6.
Abe	Jayden Rivers	Cobra Kai students who later defected to Miyagi-Do karate. Abe remains at Miyagi-Do for the remainder of the series run while Frank quits Karate in season 5.
Frank	Cameron Markeles	Cobra Kai students who later defected to Miyagi-Do karate. Abe remains at Miyagi-Do for the remainder of the series run while Frank quits Karate in season 5.

=== Cobra Kai: Season 2 (2019) introductions ===
Actors from The Karate Kid, Rob Garrison (Tommy), Ron Thomas (Bobby Brown), Tony O'Dell (Jimmy), and Randee Heller (Lucille LaRusso) made guest appearances during this season.

Character	Actor	Description
Tory Nichols	Peyton List	A troublemaker from a poor family who joins Cobra Kai and becomes its top female fighter, earning her the nickname "Queen Cobra". She is in a relationship with Miguel Diaz during season 2 and starts the school fight in the season finale to get revenge on Samantha LaRusso after witnessing her kissing Miguel. In season 3, she gets expelled because of her actions and was forced out of Cobra Kai; she had to work two jobs to support her family as her mother was ill and also got harassed by her landlord, but Kreese took care of him and she rejoins Cobra Kai and also continues fighting Sam; she and Miguel then break up after Miguel says she needs help, which she mistook for him calling her crazy. In season 4, she starts an on-off relationship with former rival-turned-friend, Robby Keene, and returns to school with the help of Amanda LaRusso and also gets Tory a family therapist after discovering her mother's health, something Tory is grateful for; at the end of season 4, she wins the All-Valley tournament against Sam. In season 5, after finding out that Terry Silver cheated to get the win, she remains with Cobra Kai, not trusting Terry anymore, but she stayed at the dojo as she was secretly working with John Kreese to get revenge on Silver with the latter being framed for beating up Stingray when in truth it was Silver who beat him up resulting in Kreese being sent to prison, but after a plan to expose Terry went wrong that resulted in Daniel LaRusso getting beaten up by Terry Silver, Tory feels guilty; later, when Kreese changes plans and decides to no longer go after Terry, Tory, feeling betrayed, storms off and refuses to associate with Kreese any longer; she then confesses to Samantha, as well as Robby and Miguel that the Tournament was rigged; she also makes a new enemy, Kim Da-Eun, a Sensei from South Korea who Terry hired to help him expande the growth of Cobra Kai; eventually, after fighting Kim Da-Eun with both Sam and Devon's help and Terry finally being exposed, she defects from Cobra Kai in the season 5 finale and officially joins the Miyagi-Fang alliance at the start of season 6, making up with Sam in the process. After the death of her mother she later leaves them, and rejoins John Kreese and Kim Da-Eun's (despite her strong hatred for the latter) newly established Cobra Kai dojo in South Korea, shocking Daniel, Johnny, Sam and a heartbroken Robby after seeing her in the Cobra Kai gi; she wins the Sakai Taikai against Zara Malik in the finale and ends up becoming a karate influencer and competitor together with Robby. Her character has evolved from being a merciless antagonist (seasons 2 and 3) to a more sympathetic anti-hero and then a kindhearted hero. (seasons 4–6).
Raymond "Stingray" Porter	Paul Walter Hauser	A Cobra Kai student, a manchild and a member of Hawk's gang. Is put on probation, but later is able to return when Terry coerces him into a deal by framing Kreese. Stingray later regrets his actions and confesses the truth. He later opens up a Cobra Kai dojo training pre-high school students.
Chris	Khalil Everage	One of the Cobra Kai students, but then leaves to join Miyagi-Do. Is close friends with Mitch.
Mitch	Aedin Mincks	One of the Cobra Kai students, but gets kicked out by Kreese despite Hawk's protests and then joins Eagle Fang, but at some point in season 5, he became an undercover spy for Cobra Kai and then reveals his truth colours that he was with them revealing their secrets to Cobra Kai, shocking the Eagle Fang and Miyagi-Do students, as well as Robby and Tory who no longer trusted Cobra Kai. In season 6, he later joins Miyagi-Do after learning Cobra Kai's cheating, with his friends not trusting him and refuse to let him join, but after he reveals he's wearing a Miyagi-Do shirt, they accept him. Is close friends with Chris.
Nate	Nathaniel Oh	Originally a Cobra Kai student, but then leaves to join Miyagi-Do! He is close friends with Bert.
Rick	Matt Mangum	A boyfriend of Shannon's that she goes to Mexico with, resulting in the rent to her apartment falling behind.
Sunny Mitchell	Kathleen Hogan	Host of the annual Valley Fest.
Sandra Robinson	Kim Fields	Aisha's mother and wife of Isaiah; boasts about how Cobra Kai changed her daughter's life for the better.
Fisherman	Jesse Santoyo	A fisherman who is fishing on the beach Daniel has an interaction with. After Daniel tells the fisherman he failed to get new students for Miyagi-Do, the fisherman gives Daniel some friendly advice to wait for the people who need him and he might get more students.
Derek	JC Leuyer	A criminal companion of Trey and Cruz's. They all get defeated by Daniel in a fight for stealing from the Country Club and all three are arrested.
Mrs. Moskowitz	Caroline Avery Granger	Seen in a flashback where she urges West Valley High over the phone to do something about the cyberbullying inflicted on her son, Eli, about his facial deformity.
Rico	N/A	Tattoo artist who gives Hawk a tattoo of a hawk on his back.
Big Red	Christopher Ryan Lewis	Cobra Kai student; Lil Red's older brother. He permanently quits Cobra Kai after Terry Silver's cheating is exposed and joins Miyagi-Do in season 6.
Lil Red	Shane Donovan Lewis	Cobra Kai student, then joins Miyagi-Do; Big Red's younger brother.
Mikey Miller	Chris Schmidt Jr.	One of the Cobra Kai students and the second-in-command of Hawk's gang; supporting antagonist in Seasons 2 and 3; quits Cobra Kai.
Doug Rickenberger	John Cihangir	One of the Cobra Kai students and member of Hawk's gang; supporting antagonist in Seasons 2 and 3; quits Cobra Kai.
Graham	Alex Collins	English man who dates Carmen. After he ghosts Carmen and badmouthes her, Johnny beats him up.
Piper Elswith	Selah Austria	Moon's ex-girlfriend; joins Cobra Kai along with her gymnastic teammates in season 4. She later participates in the 51st All-Valley Karate Tournament (Girls Division), but is defeated by Sam in the quarter-finals; the 51st Tournament is the last time she's seen onscreen. In season 5, still a part of Cobra Kai, though offscreen, she was at the Waterpark where she films and posts a video on Instagram of Kenny and Kyler kicking Anthony in the pool, something Samantha discovers and confronts Anthony about it. She isn't mentioned again after this and seemingly quits Cobra Kai before Terry Silver's cheating was exposed, or was possibly on vacation and only heard about the cheating while on vacation which lead her to quit along with everyone else.
Ear Gauge	Scott Hamm	A man at a bar harassing a waitress; he then insults Tommy, Johnny's friend and a former Cobra Kai student, angering Johnny and Tommy, and they, along with Bobby and Jimmy fight and defeat the guy and his gang.
Waitress	Ahsia Pettigrew	A bar waitress being harassed by a man; Johnny and his buddies, former Cobra Kai gang Tommy, Bobby and Jimmy fight the man and his gang and the waitress assists Johnny by giving him a glass to smash over the man's head.
Claire	Shakirah DeMesier	Thee women Johnny has individual dates with he picked from his dating app respectively, but Johnny's outdated phrases and comments turn them off.
Veronica	Sarah Grace Sanders	Thee women Johnny has individual dates with he picked from his dating app respectively, but Johnny's outdated phrases and comments turn them off.
Ashley	Amor Owens	Thee women Johnny has individual dates with he picked from his dating app respectively, but Johnny's outdated phrases and comments turn them off.
Melissa	Gena Shaw	Woman who hits on Johnny at the bar; later spends time drinking with Johnny; Johnny then departs to find Carmen.
Cutter	Stephan Jones	Construction worker who loans Johnny his cement mixer truck for the Cobra Kai students to manually rotate the drum as part of their strength training.
Fawn	K.D. O'Hair	Stingray's girlfriend whom he brings with her to Moon's party. Fawn shows discomfort upon learning Moon, The Miyagi-Do students and Cobra Kai students are teenagers and not adults.
Alice	Natasha Tina Liu	The school announcer who is reading the morning announcements until Tory walks in and snatches the school PA system from her, with Tory saying she is coming for Samantha, which leads to the school fight.
Principal Lopez	Jose Miguel Vasquez	The principal of West Valley High. He is horrified when the school fight breaks out, and shows complete disgust when Stingray who was attempting to apply for a job at the school also joins in on the fight. In Season 3, he, Counselor Blatt and the school board hold a night school meeting with angry parents in attendance with Lopez saying there will be no more school fights.

=== Cobra Kai: Season 3 (2021) introductions ===
Actors from The Karate Kid and The Karate Kid II, Elisabeth Shue (Ali Mills), Ron Thomas (Bobby Brown), Tamlyn Tomita (Kumiko Tanaka), Traci Toguchi (Yuna), and Yuji Okumoto (Chozen Toguchi) all made guest appearances during this season.

Character	Actor	Description
Shawn Payne	Okea Eme-Akwari	Former juvenile detainee at Sylmar Juvenile Corrections, which he was eventually released from by the start of season 6. He is the older brother of Kenny Payne. He deeply cares for his brother and tells Kenny not to go down the same path like he did.
Roger	Rick Perez	At angry parent attending the school board meeting who scolds Principal Lopez and Counselor Blatt for not stopping the school fight fast enough, and angrily rips into Daniel for being responsible for causing the fight for training Robby.
Joe	Diesel Madkins	A police officer who recognizes Johnny from the Applebee's incident and after realizing Robby, a wanted fugitive, is his son, he compares Robby to Johnny telling Johnny that the apple doesn't fall too far from the tree.
Stacey	Marcelle LeBlanc	A high school student who praises Demetri for his fighting skills and mocks Hawk for losing the school fight and his bed wetting after he hits on her.
Brandon Nichols	Kellan Trawny	Tory's younger brother and Grace's son. He is a quiet kid and with his mother being ill, Tory is taking care of him and their mother. He was staying at a friends house for a sleepover when his mother died in season 6. After Grace's death, it became unknown of what happened to Brandon as he isn't mentioned again.
Rodney	Grayson Berry	Tory's apartment complex landlord; After learning he's been harassing her, Kreese intimidates him into backing off from Tory so she can re-join Cobra Kai.
David	Jesse Kove	Portrayed by Martin Kove's son, he is a college varsity captain in 1965; enlisted for the U.S. Army during the Vietnam War, but chose to bully John Kreese throughout high school. Kreese later beats him and his friend James up after he caught David abusing Betsy. While not confirmed, he was seen driving a yellow 1947 Ford Super Deluxe convertible which he calls a piece of junk; it's possible it was the very same car Mr. Miyagi had which later became Daniel's car in 1984, meaning David sold it to Mr. Miyagi for his car collection.
Betsy	Emily Marie Palmer	Kreese's girlfriend from his youth in 1965; originally David's girlfriend. She is then seen kissing Kreese goodbye when he is about to board a bus for basic training with Kreese promising he would return to her safely. A year or two later in the late 60s, when on her way to visit her grandmother, she crashed her car wrapping it around a tree killing her; her death causes Kreese to become devastated.
James	Ken Barefield	A friend of David's in 1965 who also bullies John Kreese; later, he expresses discomfort when he sees David abusing Betsy with a slap, but after Kreese also witnesses this, Kreese fights and defeats both James and David.
Army Recruiter	Justin Torrence	An army soldier in 1965 recruiting people in the diner Kreese works at; he approaches David and offers him a pamphlet which David says he'll think about it, but once the soldier leaves, David laughs and crumples it up throwing it away, which Kreese sees and he considers joining.
Diner Manager	Royal Allen	Kreese's boss at the diner in 1965. After David trips Kreese intentionally making everybody but Betsy laugh, the manager who didn't see David trip him shakes his head thinking Kreese was simply clumsy.
Captain George Turner	Terry Serpico	Kreese's commanding officer during the Vietnam War; taught his team his style of self-defense which would become the foundation of Cobra Kai karate. He is killed by Kreese while fighting over the snake pit after taunting him about his girlfriend's death.
Ponytail	Seth Kemp	One of John Kreese's old Vietnam buddies; shot dead by the Vietcong.
Bo	Derek Russo	Owner of the Chop Shop; gets the van Robby stole from LaRusso Auto and later, he and his gang fight Daniel and Johnny.
Angel	Sam Zheng	An inmate at juvie that is being bullied by Shawn and his gang, before they start bullying Robby. In season 5, Angel has gotten out of juvie (before or during that time) and has joined Cobra Kai, but like the others, he quits once Terry's cheating was exposed.
Erik	N/A	Armand's nephews; when Armand tries to kick Kresse out of Cobra Kai by using his nephews to fight him, Kreese manages to beat both of them up as well as Armand.
Grigor	Trevor Shoulders	Armand's nephews; when Armand tries to kick Kresse out of Cobra Kai by using his nephews to fight him, Kreese manages to beat both of them up as well as Armand.
Councilperson Roberts	Zele Avradopoulos	City councilmember who wanted to ban the All-Valley Under 18 Tournament due to the aftermath of the school brawl; made a compromise that students must sign a waiver.
Dee Snider	Himself	In Cobra Kai, he is a heavy metal singer-songwriter best known as the lead vocalist of the band Twisted Sister; Miguel went through security to go to one of his concerts.
Victorious POW Fighter	James Ortiz	A fellow captivated soldier along with Kreese, Terry and their Captain. He beats/kills another soldier over the snake pit and after returning to the cage, he warns everybody about the venonmous snakes at the bottom of the pit.

=== Cobra Kai: Season 4 (2021) introductions ===
Thomas Ian Griffith reprised his role as Terry Silver from The Karate Kid III, and actors from The Karate Kid and The Karate Kid II, Yuji Okumoto (Chozen Toguchi) and Randee Heller (Lucille LaRusso), made guest appearances.

Character	Actor	Description
Kenny Payne	Dallas Dupree Young	Younger brother of Shawn Payne and the son of a U.S. Army soldier; joins Cobra Kai in an attempt to fight back against his bullies, initially as Robby's protege; in Season 5, he becomes one of the top students behind Tory in Silver's Cobra Kai. He permanently quits Cobra Kai after Terry Silver's cheating is exposed and joins Miyagi-Do in season 6. However, after Devon put laxatives in his water bottle so she can win a spot in Sekai Taikai, he briefly quits Miyagi-Do due to humiliation, thinking Anthony did it, but after Devon confesses the truth, he makes amends with Anthony becoming friends, forgives Devon and goes to Sekai Taikai taking Devon's spot.
Devon Lee	Oona O'Brien	Student and member of the debate team at West Valley High School who joins Eagle Fang; later joins Topanga after the former shuts down. She then joins Cobra Kai after Terry Silver bought out Topanga Karate, and Kim Da-eun, a Sensei from South Korea Terry hired, sees more potential in Devon then she does Tory and believes Devon is the future of Cobra Kai, but after Terry's cheating is exposed and Devon helps Tory fight Da-eun, she joins Miyagi-Do in season 6. She later puts laxatives in Kenny's water bottle to earn a spot at Sekai Taikai, which she does, but later feels guilty after realizing Kenny is blaming Anthony LaRusso instead and confesses to Kenny what she did, which Kenny forgives her for; despite Kenny taking her place in Sekai Taikai and she is no longer fighting, she remains at the event to support her team and cheer them on; she also fights in the all dojo-brawl with her team, fighting the Dublin Thunder students alongside Kenny while Samantha is fighting their female Captain.
James Payne	Paul Brian Johnson	Kenny and Shawn's father and a U.S. Army soldier serving overseas.
Kandace	Rebecca Lines	Tory's maternal aunt. She is cruel, greedy and very uncaring of her family.
Lia Cabrera	Milena Rivero	Student at West Valley Middle School, childhood friend and crush of both Anthony LaRusso and Kenny Payne.
Charlotte	Phoebe French	One of Terry Silver's newly recruited female students who joins Cobra Kai. Se permanently quits Cobra Kai after Terry Silver's cheating is exposed and joins Miyagi-Do in season 6. However, she rejoins Cobra Kai once more to support Johnny in his match against Sensei Wolf.
Lindsey	Gianna Graziano	Another female student recruited by Terry Silver alongside Charlotte and Piper Elswith. She permanently quits Cobra Kai after Terry Silver's cheating is exposed and joins Miyagi-Do in season 6. However, she rejoins Cobra Kai once more to support Johnny in his match against Sensei Wolf.
Cheyenne Hamidi	Salome Azizi	Terry Silver's English girlfriend; app developer. She invites Kreese to their tofu brunch party when he shows up unnannounced, which Terry was about to object until Kreese cuts him off and accepts the invite. They most likely broke up after Terry ignored her texts and rejoined Kreese at Cobra Kai.
Emile	Kevin Allison	A friend of Cheyenne's, attending a tofu brunch party at Terry's mansion; Kreese is annoyed by him when he says Cobra Kai is a cute name for a Karate dojo.
Carla	Alea Figueroa	Terry's maid. She drops some utensils and struggles to pick them up until Terry offers her a hand.
René	Frederic Jean	A chef who works for Terry Silver. He expresses concern over Terry's health and offers to call a doctor, which Terry politely declines. He is later seen in Season 6 on Terry's yacht, giving Terry his pills. It is not known if he was present on the yacht when it exploded which killed Terry, Kreese, and Dennis.
Vanessa LaRusso	Julia Macchio	Louie LaRusso Jr.'s sister, Daniel's cousin, daughter of Louie LaRusso Sr., and second year graduate student in child psychology. Portrayed by Ralph Macchio's daughter, her interactions with Daniel reference Marisa Tomei's character in Macchio's 1992 film, My Cousin Vinny. In season 4, she accuses Daniel and Amanda of loving Sam more than Anthony, something that angers the latter and Vanessa then says they spoil him with electronics which might have led to his bad behaviour at school. In season 5, she enters a relationship with Anoush, which angers Louie and Louie attacks Anoush, but Louie later forgives Anoush. In season 6, she shows up to the 18th LaRusso Auto Anniversary party where she flips Johnny off behind his back when he tells her he always recognizes a LaRusso; she also feels Daniel is "Bridezillaing" the dealership, which Amanda dismisses until they, along with Sam, witness Daniel shouting at Louie and Anoush, which then Amanda agrees with.
Zack Thompson	Brock Duncan	Student at West Valley Middle School, one of Anthony's friends; suspended from school because of bullying Kenny. In season 6, though he doesn't make an appearance onscreen, Zack makes a comment on a video uploaded of Kenny soiling himself calling it hilarious under the username "Zack_attack445".
Greg Hughes	P. J. Byrne	Stingray's next door neighbor; later beaten up by Stingray for Greg pointing out Stingray's underage drinking.
Slade Wang	Alex Boyer	Student at West Valley Middle School; member of Anthony's gang who helps Anthony catfish Kenny; later suspended along with his friends.
Marcus	Jaden Labady	Member of Anthony's gang who helps him bully Kenny at school; eventually suspended.
The Hammer	Erik Bello	Hockey players who Johnny insults, but Johnny then blames it on Daniel. After recognizing who Daniel is and making lewd comments about Amanda, Daniel fights them and manages to defeat all of them easily, impressing Johnny.
Chester	Jesse Haus	Hockey players who Johnny insults, but Johnny then blames it on Daniel. After recognizing who Daniel is and making lewd comments about Amanda, Daniel fights them and manages to defeat all of them easily, impressing Johnny.
Val	Nicolas Coucke	Hockey players who Johnny insults, but Johnny then blames it on Daniel. After recognizing who Daniel is and making lewd comments about Amanda, Daniel fights them and manages to defeat all of them easily, impressing Johnny.
Cindee	Avangeline Friedlander	Cindee is the daughter of LaRusso Auto employee Sheila. Samantha used to babysit her. Cindee is celebrating her birthday at a party place which is attended by The LaRusso family and Miguel while Tory is working their as an entertainer.
Gavin	Brian Troxell	A new member of the All Valley Committee who replaces Daniel as Daniel has become a full time Sensei.
Principal Fitzpatrick	Michael Burgess	Anthony and Kenny's principal, who suspends Anthony and his friends for bullying Kenny on a regular basis.
Carrie Underwood	Herself	In Cobra Kai, she is a multi-Grammy Award-winning country pop singer who is invited by Ron to the 51st All-Valley Karate Tournament.
Referee	Marcus Young	The referee of the 2019 All Valley Karate Tournament who was bribed by Terry Silver to give Cobra Kai the win, which was discovered by Tory who became distraught after relaizing she only won due to the Tournament being rigged.
Detective	Franco Castan	A detective who arrests John Kreese for the assault on Stingray, unaware John was being framed by Terry Silver for the assault. He later re-appears in Season 5 during Terry arrest and informs Daniel and Johnny about John Kreese's escape from prison.

=== Cobra Kai: Season 5 (2022) introductions ===
Yuji Okumoto reprised his role as Chozen Toguchi from The Karate Kid II and Sean Kanan and Robyn Lively reprised their roles as Master Mike Barnes and Jessica Andrews from The Karate Kid III.

Character	Actor	Description
Hector Salazar	Luis Roberto Guzmán	Miguel's biological father, Carmen's ex-husband and a criminal originally from Ecuador now residing in Mexico. He was unaware of Miguel being his biological son as Carmen left him before Miguel was born. Hector has remarried to a Mexican woman named Maria and became stepfather to her son, Luis. Although Miguel and Hector bonded at first, Hector revealed his paranoid behavior toward authorities and after he said he regrets nothing about his past, an upset Miguel decides to depart and heads back home, not telling him he is Hector's biological son.
Maria	Elvia Hill	Hector's Mexican wife, mother of Luis and Miguel's stepmother. She is unaware of Hector's crimes in Ecuador and also unaware Miguel is Hector's biological son.
Luis	EJ Sanchez	Biological son of Maria, Hector's stepson and Miguel's stepbrother. Miguel saved his life when he nearly got hit by a car.
Owen	Josh Lawson	An Australian thief on vacation in Mexico who steals money from Miguel. He later attempts to steal money from Johnny, only for Johnny to stop him and along with Robby fight and defeat Owen and his gang.
Vicente "The Wolf" Gonzales	Eryk Anders	A cage fighter in Mexico who attacks Johnny under Hector's orders, but Robby saves his dad throwing him a hot chilli pepper that Johnny then puts in The Wolf's eyes, stinging and temporary blinding him and Johnny manages to defeat him.
Eva Garcia	Darla Delgado	An emcee at a charity event, which is hosted at Terry Silver's mansion which Daniel and Amanda also attend.
Joanne	Rachelle Carson-Begley	Amanda's mother, Samantha and Anthony's maternal grandmother, and Daniel's mother-in-law who lives in Ohio and who divorced her husband after he cheated on her. She supports Amanda when she has a difficult moment in her marriage. She is the (presumably maternal) aunt of Jessica Andrews.
Elizabeth-Anne Rooney (Lizzie-Anne)	Sunny Mabrey	Rival and former classmate of Amanda and Jessica, whom Jessica refers to in The Karate Kid III who stole Jessica's boyfriend. She and her gang of friends confront Amanda and Jessica in a bar; after trading insults with each other, including calling Amanda by her high school nickname "Babe Ruthless", Elizabeth and her gang attack Amanda and Jessica, but Samantha saves them by using her Karate skills on Elizabeth knocking her down, making Elizabeth's gang back off from attacking any further and Amanda, Jessica, Samantha and Anthony flee the bar.
Kim Da-eun	Alicia Hannah-Kim, Sarah Anne (young)	The secondary antagonist of season 5, and a major antagonist turned anti-heroine in season 6. She is a Korean karate master that is summoned to the United States by Terry Silver to be a Cobra Kai sensei, and despite Tory being the champion, she dislikes Tory and believes Devon Lee is the future of Cobra Kai as she sees more potential in her; after attacking Tory, Sam and Devon come to Tory's rescue, with Kim thinking Devon was a traitor, but once Terry's cheating was exposed, Kim flees and returns to South Korea and joins forces with John Kreese instead in season 6. After the death of her student, Kwon, who died at the Sekai Taikai all-dojo brawl, she, Kreese and their dojo returned to Korea in disgrace. After her grandfather, Kim Sun-Yung, orders her to kill Kreese, she turns the tables on her grandfather and kills him instead as she wants to run the dojo her way in a more peaceful manner. She later ends up in a relationship with former rival-turned-friend, Chozen.
Kim Sun-Yung	Don L. Lee; flashback (Season 5), C.S. Lee (Season 6)	The overarching antagonist of The Karate Kid franchise as a whole. A South Korean karate sensei who trained both John Kreese and Terry Silver, ultimately turning them into the cruel men they are today; built the philosophy of the Cobra Kai dojo: "Strike First, Strike Hard, No Mercy." He is the unseen overarching antagonist of The Karate Kid and The Karate Kid Part III, and the overarching antagonist of Cobra Kai (in particular season 6). He is later killed by his granddaughter, Kim Da-eun, after he ordered her to kill Kreese; Da-eun killed him as she wants to run the dojo her way and in a more peaceful manner.
Sensei Rosenthal	Spence Maughon	A Sensei at Topanga Karate who is shocked upon learning Terry purchased the dojo and is renaming it Cobra Kai.
Gunther Braun	Carsten Norgaard	German representative for the Sekai Taikai karate tournament and was once a Sekai Taikai champion himself. After disqualifying the Russian dojo Tiger Strike as four of their students tested positively for drugs, during the Tournament, Tiger Strike's Sensei Ivanov punches out Gunther cold, leading to the all dojo-brawl, which ended in tragedy with the death of Korean Cobra Kai student Kwon Jae-Sung; Gunther cancels the remainder of Sekai Taikai. A month later, Terry Silver convinces Gunther to continue the Tournament; Gunther agrees on the condition all dojos unanimously agree to continue the Tournament, which happens, but the tournament is now held at the All Valley Sports Arena. Gunther later has a brief rivalry with Daryl, member of the All Valley Committee over who would be master of ceremonies at the Sekai Taikai, with Gunther winning the rights to announce after he knocked Daryl down with a single kick; Gunther and Daryl later make peace when the final match takes place between Johnny and Wolf and Gunther lets Daryl announce the final round.
Gabriel	Owen Harn	Criminal who beats up John Kreese in the prison; implied to have helped Kreese fake his death and escape prison.
Holly	Cece Kelly	A girl that makes out with Miguel at Miyagi-Do and Eagle Fang's celebration party after they qualified for Sekai Taikai.
Sensei Odell	Tyron Woodley	Kim Da-eun's six hired Senseis she brings with her to California; they put fear into the Cobra Kai students who talk back or refuse to obey. During the house brawl at Terry Silver's mansion, while Chozen goes to fight Terry, Mike Barnes is knocked out unconscious, leaving Johnny alone to fight them where he gets easily overpowered, but after seeing the photo of his unborn daughter's ultrasound, he gets his strength back and starts fighting them; Mike eventually regains his conscious and together, Johnny and Mike manage to defeat them all; at one point during the fight, Min-Jun accidentally cuts off Odell's pinky finger with a sword.
Sensei Morozov	Stephen Thompson	
Sensei Hyan-Woo	Jake Huang	
Sensei Min-Jun	Dante Ha	
Sensei Bacaria	Craig Henningsen	
Sensei Suk-Chin	Steve Brown	
Dr. Emily Folsom	Tracey Bonner	Psychiatrist at John Kreese's prison; she sees through Kreese's lies when he tried to smooth talk her to get a recommendation to get out of prison early. The next day during another session, in Kreese's mind, he sees visions of Betsy, Captain Turner, Tory, Terry, young 1984 Johnny Lawrence who turns into present-day Johnny, and lastly, a young version of himself sitting in Dr. Folsom's chair. During a much later session, Kreese used her keycard to escape prison which he succusfully stole when he fakes a break down with crocodile tears and she comforts him, giving him the chance to steal it when she isn't looking.
Reggie	Kevin Saunders	A limo driver and a friend of Louie's who brings Louie, Daniel, Amanda, Johnny, Carmen and Chozen to a dance club for a night of fun and dancing. When his back is turned, Mike Barnes sneaks into his limo and once Daniel, Johnny and Chozen enter the limo to head to another bar, Mike drives off without Reggie noticing.
Dr. Howard	Aba Arthur	Carmen's doctor who does the babysound for her and Johnny's baby. She reappears in season 6 when Carmen had to go under an emergency cerclage, but told Johnny she was healthy and needed bedrest for several weeks; she then appears to help delivery the baby.

=== Cobra Kai: Season 6 (2024) introductions ===
Randee Heller, Ron Thomas and Daryl Vidal reprised their roles as Lucille LaRusso, Bobby Brown, and Daryl Vidal (himself) all from The Karate Kid. Sean Kanan and William Christopher Ford reprised their roles as Mike Barnes and Dennis De Guzman, from The Karate Kid III. All of them came back as guests in the last season.

Mr. Miyagi, who in seasons 1-5 is referred to as Nariyoshi Miyagi, is also referred to as Keisuke Miyagi (his name in The Next Karate Kid) in this season.

Character	Actor	Description
Zenker	Christian Carlson	The president of the fraternity “Theta Omega” at the College of the Valley who is put Kyler through a cruel hazing and lets Kyler think he is getting into the fraternity when in reality he was plotting to drop Kyler during the ceremony. Kyler, along with Brucks, Miguel, Hawk and Demetri fight and defeat Zenker and his fraternity brothers.
Baz	Nick Jandl	A real estate agent who refuses to sell a home to Johnny when Johnny is house hunting for his family with Chozen's help.
Stevie	Adam Herschman	A man selling his home when Johnny is house hunting for his family with Chozen's help. Stevie recognizes and remembers Johnny from the '83 All Valley Karate Tournament and apologizes to Johnny for Baz's behaviour. In the series finale, Johnny buys the house from him, moving Carmen and their daughter into their new home.
Kwon Jae-Sung	Brandon H. Lee	The central antagonist to the Miyagi-Do students in season 6. He is the top student of Kim Da-eun's dojang who goes on to become the male captain of the newly revived Cobra Kai (South Korean branch). During the all-dojo brawl at the Sekai Taikai, he accidentally impales himself with Kreese's knife while fighting Axel Kovačević, which kills him. His body is later burned on a funeral pyre by Kreese and Da-eun. Not counting flashbacks, Kwon is the third character to die onscreen in the series (after Tommy and Grace Nichols), the first character to die from karate, and the first child/teen to die.
Yoon Do-Jin	Daniel J. Kim	Another student of Kim Da-eun's dojang. Formerly the top student of the dojang until defeated by Kwon. After Kwon's death, he is forced to undergo brutal training from Kim Sun-Yung until Kreese intervenes and sends him away.
Shane Page	Tony Cavalero	Owner of a boxing gym founded by his grandfather and Mr. Miyagi in the 1940s and who tells Daniel and Chozen about Mr. Miyagi's past of having committed assault and theft once.
Grace Nichols	Bethany DeZelle	Tory and Brandon's mother. She dies of a pulmonary embolism in the first part of season 6.
Dr. Judith	Deja Dee	Grace Nichols doctor. After Grace passes, she informs Tory about what caused her death. The next day, she (presumably) calls and informs Amanda LaRusso about Grace's death.
Sensei Feng "Wolf" Xiao	Lewis Tan	One of the three main antagonists (alongside John Kreese and Terry Silver) of season 6, and the final antagonist of Cobra Kai. Sensei of the Hong Kong-based Iron Dragons, and a three time Sekai Taikai champion. He forms an alliance with Terry Silver, and develops a rivalry with Johnny Lawrence over the course of season 6. In their final match, Johnny defeats Wolf using the defensive techniques taught to him by Daniel, mirroring Johnny's own defeat in The Karate Kid.
Axel Kovačević	Patrick Luwis	The male captain of the Iron Dragons. He develops romantic feelings for Samantha LaRusso, but is turned down by her. This leads to him developing an intense hatred for Miguel Diaz, Sam's boyfriend. He unintentionally and indirectly kills Kwon Jae-Sung by kicking him during the all-dojo brawl, causing him to fall on Kreese's knife. Later, Axel injures Robby Keene, but in his final fight with Miguel, he chooses to fight fair despite Wolf's urging and is defeated. Disgusted with Wolf, Axel then quits the Iron Dragons.
Zara Malik	Rayna Vallandingham	The female captain of the Iron Dragons. She is Tory's main rival during the Sekai Taikai. She is highly skilled in karate while also a frequently vlogger on her phone. Their rivalry gets more personal later on when Zara has a one-night stand with a drunk Robby Keene. She is later defeated by Tory during their final match.
Maria Alvarez	Jewelianna Ramos-Ortiz	The female captain of the Spanish team Furia de Pantera (Panther's Fury). She is a formidable opponent who makes it to the semi-finals of the Sekai Taikai, and also develops romantic feelings for Demetri by dancing with him. Later on, she and her team fight alongside Demetri and Hawk during the all-dojo brawl, making her dojo one of the few dojos to be allies with Miyagi-Do and not their enemies.
Diego Aguilar	Justin Ortiz	The male captain of the Spanish team Furia de Pantera (Panther's Fury). He has a mohawk similar to Hawk. Along with Maria and their team, they fight alongside Demetri and Hawk during the all-dojo brawl, making his dojo one of the few dojos to be allies with Miyagi-Do and not their enemies.
Cara McAllistar	Caitlin Hutson	The female captain of the Irish team Dublin Thunder. She is very ruthless and a highly skilled martial artist. She vowed revenge against Samantha after her dojo lost the first round and is defeated once again during the all-dojo brawl.
Ivanov	Joshua Lamboy	The Russian Sensai's of Tiger Strike (Udar Tigra in Russian). After their dojo was disqualified from Sekai Taikai as four of their students tested positive for PEDs, they swear revenge on Gunther and later during Sekai Taikai, they start the all-dojo brawl by attacking Gunther and Sekai Taikai officials. During the brawl, they fight Chozen and Kim Da-Eun, but are defeated by them along with Gunther's help. After the brawl ended in the death of Korean Cobra Kai student Kwon, Tiger Strike was permanently banned from future Sekai Taikai tournaments.
Oksana	Britt Baker	
Vlad	Daniel Wheat	The male captain of Russian team Tiger Strike. After Tiger Strike is disqualified from Sekai Taikai as four of the students tested positive for drugs, they start the all-dojo brawl. After the death of Korean Cobra Kai student Kwon, Tiger Strike was permanently banned from future Sekai Taikai events. Though not confirmed, Vlad was most likely one of the four Tiger Strike students who tested positive for drugs since he was the captain.
Gunther's assistant	Linda Bustamantle	Gunther's Spanish assistant who informs Gunther on Tiger Strike testing positively for drugs. She is later brutally attacked by Sensei Oksana of Tiger Strike when she pleads with everyone to stop fighting at the all-dojo brawl.
Stew	Josh Banks	A belligerent passenger who is rude towards everyone on the plane on its way to California, including Johnny and the flight attendant. Miguel knocks him out cold, resulting in all of the passengers on the plane to clap appreciatively.
Flight Attendant	Sharayu Mahale	A flight attendant who warns Johnny and the belligerent passenger to stop fighting or she'll get the Captain involved.
Jace	Jesse Malinowski	Shannon's current boyfriend. He is at the school in Counselor Blatt's office alongside Shannon, Robby, Johnny and Carmen to discuss Robby's future.
Winnie Taylor	Elizabeth Berkley	Moon's mother and also mother to an older daughter in college named Sage. She is good friends with Daniel and Amanda and spends a day out with them, along with Chozen for wine tasting. She introduces Chozen to tarot cards and after hearing about his heartbreaking letter from Kumiko, she ensures Chozen there is somebody out there special for him, and Chozen and Winnie become friends and they toast.
Laura Lawrence-Diaz	N/A	Johnny and Carmen's daughter, maternal granddaughter of Rosa and younger paternal and maternal half-sister of Robby and Miguel respectively, born in part 3 of season 6. Was named after her late paternal grandmother, Laura Lawrence.
Kevin Burkhardt	Himself	Sportscaster Kevin Burkhardt and former American professional football player Ryan Clark are present at the Sekai Taikai at the All Valley Sports Arena broadcasting the event.
Ryan Clark	Himself	Sportscaster Kevin Burkhardt and former American professional football player Ryan Clark are present at the Sekai Taikai at the All Valley Sports Arena broadcasting the event.
Julia	Charlene Amoia	A business woman who offers Tory and Robby a career offer for marketing and promoting karate worldwide together, which they both accept.
Ezra	Hayden Schlossberg	Terry Silver's lawyer.
Autograph Girl #1	Hadley Hurwitz	Two fans getting Robby and Tory's autographs. These girls were portrayed by the daughters of Cobra Kai creator Jon Hurwitz.
Autograph Girl #2	Elizabeth Hurwitz	Two fans getting Robby and Tory's autographs. These girls were portrayed by the daughters of Cobra Kai creator Jon Hurwitz.
Blue Shirt Boy Outside Dojo	Andrew Weintraub	A kid waiting in line to sign up for and join Cobra Kai. He's portrayed by the grandson of the late producer Jerry Weintraub, who produced The Karate Kid films.
Jeremy	Josh Heald	Two business men at a restaurant discussing a Back to the Future reboot. These are two of the Cobra Kai creators making a cameo appearance in the final scene for the series finale.
Jake	Jon Hurwitz	Two business men at a restaurant discussing a Back to the Future reboot. These are two of the Cobra Kai creators making a cameo appearance in the final scene for the series finale.

== Additional adaptations ==
=== The Karate Kid (1989 animated series) ===
The animated series had different voice actors for the following characters: Joey Dedio as Daniel LaRusso, Robert Ito as Mr. Miyagi, and Janice Kawaye as Taki Tamurai, the latter being an original character exclusive to the cartoon; Pat Morita, despite not voicing Mr. Miyagi, did narrate the plot of the episodes in the opening teaser; additionally, actors Tamlyn Tomita and Joey Miyashima, who portrayed Kumiko and Toshio in The Karate Kid Part II respectively, each voiced additional characters in one episode. Josh Heald, Jon Hurwitz, and Hayden Schlossberg have stated that the Karate Kid animated television show is not canon, but an easter egg from it appears in Season 3 of Cobra Kai.

=== Broadway ===
In January 2020, a Broadway musical adaptation of The Karate Kid was revealed to be in development. Amon Miyamoto served as the director, with an accompanying novel being written by the original film's screenwriter Robert Mark Kamen. Drew Gasparini is the lyricist and composer of the score, while Keone and Mari Madrid choreographed the play. Kumiko Yoshii and Michael Wolk will serve as producers, with The Kinoshita Group. The cast will include Jovanni Sy as Mr. Miyagi, John Cardoza as Daniel LaRusso, Kate Baldwin as Lucille LaRusso, Alan H. Green as John Kreese, Jake Bentley Young as Johnny Lawrence, Jetta Juriansz as Ali Mills, and Luis-Pablo Garcia as Freddie Fernandez. The adaption debuted in St. Louis in June 2022.
