= And the Flying Boombox =

Studio album by No More Kings
- Released: May 12, 2009
- Genre: Rock
- Length: 38:07 (US)
- Label: Astonish Records

No More Kings chronology
| No More Kings (2007) | And the Flying Boombox (2009) | III (2014) |

And the Flying Boombox is the second album by Los Angeles rock band No More Kings. It was released May 12, 2009.

The album produced two singles, "Obey the Groove" and "Dance Alone"

== Track listing ==
1. "Obey the Groove"
2. "Dance Alone"
3. "Something to Hide"
4. "Critical Hit"
5. "King of Rock / Sucka MCs"
6. "Circle Gets a Square"
7. "Leroy and Me"
8. "Paper Airplane"
9. "Write Me a Letter"
10. "Robots Don't Cry"
11. "Cellphone"
