= The Karate Kid =

1984 film by John Avildsen

- Theatrical release poster
- Directed by: John G. Avildsen
- Written by: Robert Mark Kamen
- Produced by: Jerry Weintraub
- Starring: Ralph Macchio; Noriyuki "Pat" Morita; Elisabeth Shue
- Cinematography: James Crabe
- Edited by: John G. Avildsen; Walt Mulconery; Bud S. Smith
- Music by: Bill Conti
- Production companies: Delphi II Productions; JW Productions
- Distributed by: Columbia Pictures
- Release date: June 22, 1984
- Running time: 126 minutes
- Country: United States
- Language: English
- Budget: $8 million
- Box office: $130.8 million

The Karate Kid is a 1984 American martial arts drama film directed by John G. Avildsen and written by Robert Mark Kamen. It is the first film in The Karate Kid franchise. The film stars Ralph Macchio, Pat Morita, Elisabeth Shue and William Zabka. The story follows Daniel LaRusso (Macchio), an Italian-American teenager from New Jersey who moves with his widowed mother to the Reseda neighborhood of Los Angeles. There, LaRusso encounters harassment from bullies, one of whom is Johnny Lawrence (Zabka), the ex-boyfriend of LaRusso's love interest, Ali Mills (Shue). LaRusso is taught karate by handyman and war veteran Mr. Miyagi (Morita) to help LaRusso defend himself and compete in a karate tournament against his bullies.

Kamen was approached by Columbia Pictures to compose a film similar to Avildsen's previous success Rocky (1976), after Columbia signed the director. Kamen drew inspiration from the real-life events of an eight-year-old Tum Pai student's story in Hawaii when writing the film. As a result, he maintained strong opinions regarding cast, and petitioned heavily for Morita's inclusion. Preparations for the film began immediately after the final edit of the script was complete, and casting took place between April and June 1983. Filming began on October 31, 1983, in Los Angeles and was completed by December 16. The film was Macchio's second major film role, following The Outsiders (1983).

The Karate Kid was theatrically released in the United States on June 22, 1984. It received positive reviews from critics. The film was also a commercial success, grossing over $130 million worldwide, making it one of the highest-grossing films of 1984 and Hollywood's biggest sleeper hit of the year. The Karate Kid revitalized the acting career of Morita, who was previously known mostly for comedic roles, and it earned him a nomination for the Academy Award for Best Supporting Actor. The film subsequently launched a media franchise and is credited for popularizing karate in the United States. In 2025, the film was selected for preservation in the United States National Film Registry by the Library of Congress as being "culturally, historically or aesthetically significant."

== Plot ==
In 1984, 17-year-old Daniel LaRusso and his mother Lucille move from Newark, New Jersey, to Reseda, Los Angeles, California. Their apartment's handyman is an eccentric, but kind and humble Okinawan immigrant named Nariyoshi Miyagi.

At a beach party the next day, Daniel meets and befriends Ali Mills, a high school cheerleader from Encino, drawing the attention of her arrogant ex-boyfriend Johnny Lawrence, a black belt and the top student from the Cobra Kai dojo, training in an aggressive form of karate. Johnny and his Cobra Kai gang (Bobby Brown, Tommy, Jimmy, and Dutch) constantly bully Daniel. At a Halloween dance, after Daniel sprays water on him with a hose as payback, Johnny and his gang pursue him and brutally beat him, but Mr. Miyagi intervenes and easily defeats them.

Amazed, Daniel asks Mr. Miyagi to teach him karate. He declines, but agrees to accompany Daniel to Cobra Kai to resolve the conflict. The next day, they meet the sensei, John Kreese, an ex-Special Forces Vietnam veteran who callously dismisses the peace offering. Miyagi then proposes that Daniel enter the Under 18 All-Valley Karate Championships to compete against Kreese's students on equal terms, and requests that the bullying cease while he trains. Kreese agrees to the terms, but warns that if Daniel does not show up for the tournament, the harassment will continue for both of them.

Daniel's training starts with days of menial chores that seemingly only serve to provide free labor for Miyagi. When he becomes frustrated, Miyagi demonstrates that repetition of these chores has helped Daniel to learn defensive blocks through muscle memory. Their bond develops, and Miyagi opens up to Daniel about his life, including the dual loss of his wife and son in childbirth at the Manzanar internment camp while he was serving with the 442nd Infantry Regiment during World War II in Europe, where he received the Medal of Honor. Through Mr. Miyagi's teaching, Daniel learns not only karate but also significant life lessons such as the importance of personal balance, reflected in the principle that martial arts training is as much about training the spirit as the body. Daniel applies the life lessons Miyagi has taught him to strengthen his relationship with Ali. On Daniel's 18th birthday, Miyagi gives Daniel a Karate gi for the tournament and one of his classic cars.

At the tournament, Daniel surprises the audience and competitors by reaching the semi-finals. Johnny advances to the finals after scoring three unanswered points against Darryl Vidal. Kreese instructs his second-best student, Bobby, one of his more compassionate students and the least vicious of Daniel's tormentors, to disable Daniel with an illegal attack to the knee. Bobby reluctantly does so, severely injuring Daniel and getting himself disqualified in the process. Daniel is taken to the locker room, where the physician determines that he cannot continue. However, Daniel believes that if he quits, his tormentors will have gotten the best of him. As a result, Daniel convinces Miyagi to use a pain suppression technique to help him continue.

Just as Johnny is about to be declared the winner by default, Daniel returns to fight. The match is a seesaw battle, with neither able to break through the other's defense. The match is halted when Daniel uses a scissor-leg technique to trip Johnny, delivering a blow to the back of his head and giving Johnny a nosebleed. Kreese directs Johnny to sweep Daniel's injured leg – an unethical move. Johnny looks horrified at the order, but reluctantly agrees. As the match resumes and the score is tied 2–2, Johnny seizes Daniel's leg and deals a vicious elbow, doing further damage. Daniel, standing with difficulty, assumes the "Crane" stance, a technique that he observed Mr. Miyagi performing on a beach. Johnny lunges toward Daniel, who jumps and executes a front kick to Johnny's chin, scoring the tournament-winning point and becoming the new champion. Johnny, having gained newfound respect for his nemesis, presents the trophy to Daniel himself, as Daniel is carried off by an enthusiastic crowd while Miyagi looks on proudly.

== Cast ==
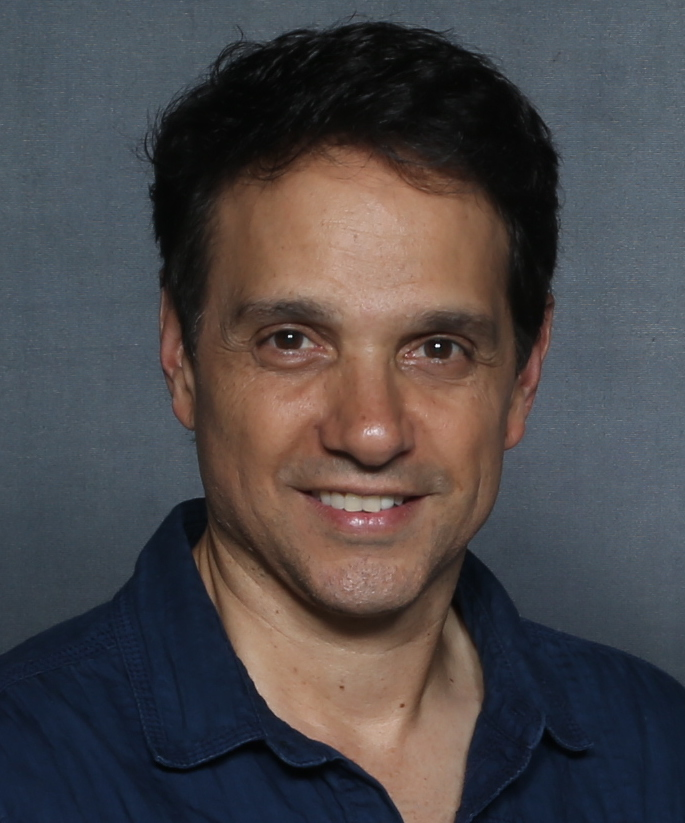
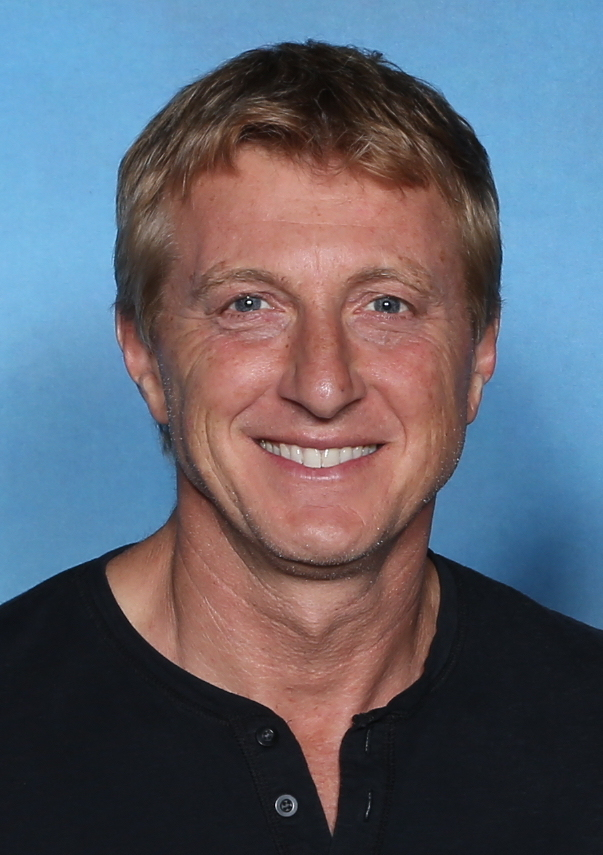
Ralph Macchio in 2018 (left) and William Zabka in 2019
- Ralph Macchio as Daniel LaRusso
- Pat Morita as Mr. Miyagi
- Elisabeth Shue as Ali Mills
- Martin Kove as John Kreese
- Randee Heller as Lucille LaRusso
- William Zabka as Johnny Lawrence
- Chad McQueen as Dutch
- Ron Thomas as Bobby Brown
- Tony O'Dell as Jimmy
- Rob Garrison as Tommy
- Pat E. Johnson as Head Referee

== Production ==
=== Development ===
The Karate Kid is partly based on the life of its screenwriter, Robert Mark Kamen. At age 17, shortly after attending the 1964 New York World's Fair, Kamen was assaulted by a gang of bullies and began studying martial arts for self-defense. Unhappy with his first instructor, who promoted martial arts primarily as a means of violence and revenge, Kamen later trained in Okinawan Gōjū-ryū karate under a Japanese teacher who spoke no English but had studied with Chōjun Miyagi.

As a Hollywood screenwriter, Kamen was mentored by Frank Price, who informed him that producer Jerry Weintraub had optioned a news article about the young son of a single mother who earned a black belt to defend himself from neighborhood bullies. Drawing on both the article and elements of his own life, Kamen developed the screenplay for The Karate Kid. Because director John G. Avildsen had also helmed the Rocky films, Sylvester Stallone frequently joked with Kamen that he had "ripped off" Rocky when writing The Karate Kid.

DC Comics owns a character called Karate Kid, a member of the Legion of Super-Heroes who was created in 1966. The filmmakers received permission from DC Comics in 1984 to use the title for the film and its sequels.

=== Casting ===
A number of actors were considered for the part of Daniel, including Sean Penn, Robert Downey Jr., Charlie Sheen, Jon Cryer, Emilio Estevez, Nicolas Cage, Anthony Edwards, C. Thomas Howell, Tom Cruise, Eric Stoltz and D. B. Sweeney. Ralph Macchio was ultimately cast on the strength of his performance as Johnny Cade in The Outsiders (1983). Macchio has stated that his performance as Johnny influenced the development of Daniel LaRusso in The Karate Kid. Macchio later commented that the character was originally named "Danny Weber", but was later changed to "LaRusso".

The studio originally wanted the role of Mr. Miyagi to be played by Toshiro Mifune, who had appeared in the Akira Kurosawa films Rashomon (1950), Seven Samurai (1954), and The Hidden Fortress (1958), but this proved unworkable as Mifune did not speak English. Pat Morita auditioned for the role, but was initially rejected due to his association with comedic roles such as Arnold on Happy Days, and because the studio did not find him believable as an Okinawan immigrant. Morita then grew out his beard and recorded a second audition using an accent patterned after his uncle, which led to him being cast.

Crispin Glover was the first choice to play Johnny, but the studio later opted for William Zabka. After his audition, Zabka saw Macchio, who noted that Zabka scared him during his audition to the studio. When he was cast, Zabka was a wrestler with no previous training in karate. Zabka later recalled his audition, saying he was told to act out a scene from the script, while wearing a headband. He walked up to and grabbed John Avildsen, and said "Watch your mouth asshole!" He then exited the room and came back in, took his headband off and said that it was Johnny, not Billy. Avildsen then asked him about his age, and his height when compared to karate kid. Zabka responded, "Bruce Lee was smaller than Kareem Abdul Jabbar, but he beat him", in reference to Game of Death, to which Avildsen confirmed it. Avildsen was then convinced to cast Zabka for the role.

Helen Hunt and Demi Moore were also considered for the role of Ali, but Elisabeth Shue was cast based partly on a Burger King commercial that became widely popular in the early 1980s. The film marks the debut roles of both Zabka and Shue. Late in production, Valerie Harper was considered for the role of Lucille, but the studio later instated Randee Heller for the role.

=== Filming ===
Filming began on October 31, 1983, and finished on December 16.

The film's fight choreographer for the combat scenes was Pat E. Johnson, a Tang Soo Do karate black belt who had previously been featured in Bruce Lee's American–Hong Kong martial arts film Enter the Dragon (1973) and worked with Chuck Norris at American Tang Soo Do martial arts schools. Johnson also makes an appearance as the referee in The Karate Kid. Pat Morita's stunt double for Mr. Miyagi, Fumio Demura, is also a karate black belt who had previously worked with Bruce Lee, who learnt some nunchaku techniques from Demura.

== Soundtrack ==
The musical score for The Karate Kid was composed by Bill Conti, a frequent collaborator of director John G. Avildsen since their initial pairing on Rocky (1976). The instrumental score was orchestrated by Jack Eskew and featured pan flute solos by Gheorge Zamfir. On March 12, 2007, Varèse Sarabande released all four Karate Kid scores in a four-CD box set limited to 2,500 copies worldwide.

In 1984, a soundtrack album was released by Casablanca Records containing many of the contemporary songs featured in the film. Of particular note is Joe Esposito's "You're the Best", featured during the tournament montage near the end of the first film. Originally written for Rocky III (1982), "You're the Best" was rejected by Sylvester Stallone in favor of Survivor's hit song "Eye of the Tiger". Coincidentally, Survivor also performed the main theme ("The Moment of Truth" Music & Lyrics: Bill Conti, Dennis Lambert, Peter Beckett) for the movie.

Bananarama's 1984 hit song "Cruel Summer" also made its US debut in The Karate Kid but was excluded from the film's soundtrack album. Other songs featured in the film but left off the album include "Please Answer Me" performed by Broken Edge and "The Ride" performed by The Matches.

Side A of the 1984 soundtrack
No.	Title	Writer(s)	Length
1.	"The Moment of Truth" (Survivor)	Dennis Lambert, Peter Beckett (lyrics); Bill Conti (music)	3:46
2.	"(Bop Bop) On the Beach" (The Flirts, Jan and Dean)	Mike Love	2:47
3.	"No Shelter" (Broken Edge)	John Mark, Richie Fenton	3:59
4.	"Young Hearts" (Commuter)	David Merenda	3:38
5.	"(It Takes) Two to Tango" (Paul Davis)	Lambert, Beckett	3:52

Side B
No.	Title	Writer(s)	Length
1.	"Tough Love" (Shandi)	Shandi, Toni Stern	3:25
2.	"Rhythm Man" (St. Regis)	A. Flashman, A. Hutt, G. Challen, G. St. Regis, J. Peters, M. St. Regis, R. Adams	4:15
3.	"Feel the Night" (Baxter Robertson)	Robertson (lyrics); Conti (music)	3:18
4.	"Desire" (Gang of Four)	Andy Gill, Jon King	4:03
5.	"You're the Best"" (Joe Esposito)	Allee Willis (lyrics); Conti (music)	2:59

== Reception ==
=== Box office ===
The film was a commercial success, grossing $100 million in the United States and Canada to become one of the highest-grossing films of 1984 and Hollywood's biggest sleeper hit of the year. Following the release of Cobra Kai, The Karate Kid re-releases in 2018 and 2019 grossed a further $400,529 in the United States and Canada, bringing its domestic total to $100,400,529 (equivalent to $311,000,000 in 2025).

In the United Kingdom, the film topped the box office for two weeks and grossed £2,960,939 ($3,947,919). By 1989, it had grossed $130 million worldwide. Between 2018 and 2020, the film grossed a further $400,529 in the United States and Canada, and $42,257 in the United Kingdom bringing its worldwide total to $130,442,786 (equivalent to $404,000,000 in 2025).

The film sold an estimated 27,072,000 tickets in the United States and Canada. The film also sold 1.9 million tickets in Spain, 1,888,845 tickets in France and Germany, and 137,217 tickets in the South Korean capital of Seoul, adding up to 30,998,062 tickets sold in the United States, Canada, Spain, France, Germany, and Seoul.

=== Critical response ===
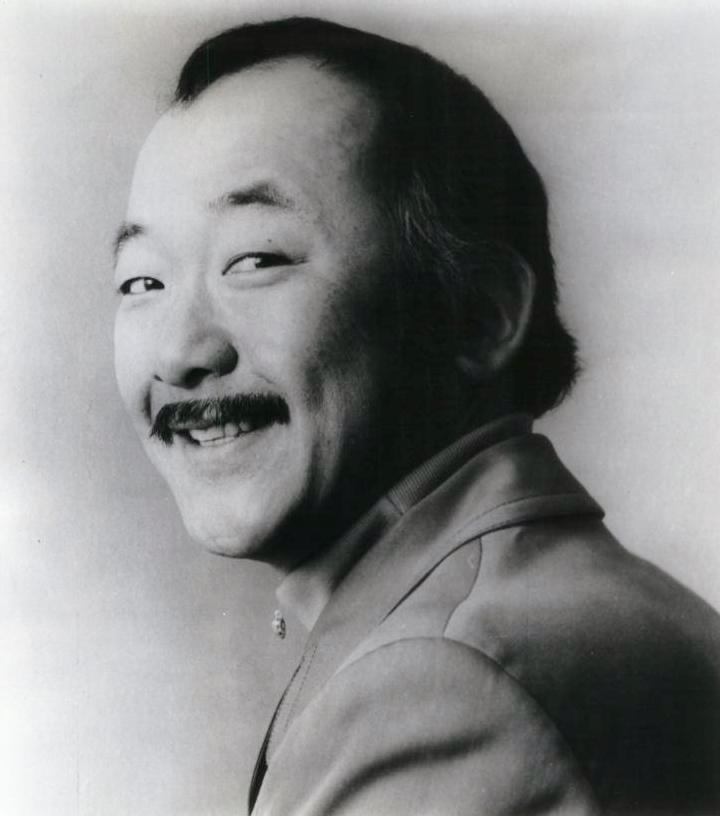
Pat Morita's performance received critical acclaim, earning him a nomination for the Academy Award for Best Supporting Actor.

On the review aggregator Rotten Tomatoes, the film holds an approval rating of 81% based on 97 reviews, with an average rating of 7.2/10. The website's critics consensus reads: "Utterly predictable and wholly of its time, but warm, sincere, and difficult to resist, due in large part to Morita and Macchio's relaxed chemistry." On Metacritic, the film has a weighted average score of 61 out of 100, based on 16 critics, indicating "generally favorable reviews". Audiences polled by CinemaScore gave the film an average grade of "A" on an A+ to F scale.

On its release, Roger Ebert called the film one of the year's best, gave it four stars out of four, and described it as an exciting, sweet-tempered, heart-warming story with interesting friendships in the film. Janet Maslin of The New York Times also gave a positive review. The Karate Kid ranked #40 on Entertainment Weekly's list of the 50 Best High School Movies.

The Karate Kid launched the career of Macchio, who would turn into a teen idol featured on the covers of magazines such as Tiger Beat. It revitalized the acting career of Morita, previously known mostly for his comedic role as Arnold on Happy Days, who was nominated for the Academy Award for Best Supporting Actor for his performance as Miyagi. Morita reprised his role in three subsequent sequels, while Macchio returned for two.

Upon release of the 2010 remake, Dana Stevens wrote: "The 1984 original ... may have seemed like a standard-issue inspirational sports picture at the time, but (as with another box-office hit of the same year, The Terminator), a generation of remove reveals what a well-crafted movie it actually was. Rewatched today, the original Kid, directed by Rocky's John G. Avildsen, feels smart and fresh, with a wealth of small character details and a leisurely middle section that explores the boy's developing respect for his teacher."

=== Accolades ===
Year	Award	Category	Nominee	Result	Ref.
1985	Academy Awards	Best Supporting Actor	Pat Morita	Nominated	
1985	Golden Globe Awards	Best Supporting Actor – Motion Picture	Pat Morita	Nominated	
1985	Young Artist Awards	Best Family Motion Picture – Drama		Won	
1985	Young Artist Awards	Best Young Supporting Actor in a Motion Picture Musical, Comedy, Adventure or Drama	William Zabka	Nominated	
1985	Young Artist Awards	Best Young Supporting Actress in a Motion Picture Musical, Comedy, Adventure or Drama	Elisabeth Shue	Won	

American Film Institute

- AFI's 100 Years...100 Cheers – #98

=== Home media ===
In the United Kingdom, the film was watched by 3.7 million viewers on television in 2017, making it the year's tenth most-watched film on UK multichannel television.

=== Merchandise ===
The film spawned a franchise of related items and memorabilia such as action figures, headbands, posters, T-shirts, and a video game. A novelization was made by B. B. Hiller and published in 1984. The novel had a scene that was in the rehearsal when Daniel encounters Johnny during school at lunch. Also, at the end, there was a battle between Miyagi and Kreese in the parking lot after the tournament which was the original ending for the film and used as the beginning of The Karate Kid Part II. On May 7, 2019, The Karate Kid: The Classic Illustrated Storybook was published by Quirk Books under their Pop Classics series. It retold the events of the first film with art by Kim Smith.

In 2015, toy company Funko revived The Karate Kid action figures. Two versions of LaRusso, a version of Lawrence and a version of Miyagi were part of the line. The toys were spotted at retailers Target and Amazon.com.

=== Cultural influence ===
Ralph Macchio's reaction to the film being inducted into the National Film Registry

The series has been credited for popularizing karate in the United States.

The American experimental rock band Sweep the Leg Johnny derives their name from a line from the film.

The 2007 music video for the song "Sweep the Leg" by No More Kings stars William Zabka (who also directed the video) as a caricature of himself and features references to The Karate Kid, including cameo appearances by Zabka's former Karate Kid co-stars.

Macchio and Zabka made a guest appearance as themselves in the How I Met Your Mother episode "The Bro Mitzvah". In the episode, Macchio is invited to Barney Stinson's bachelor party, leading to Barney shouting that he hates Macchio and that Johnny was the real hero of The Karate Kid. Towards the end of the episode, a clown in the party wipes off his makeup and reveals himself as Zabka.

In 2025, the film was selected for preservation in the United States National Film Registry by the Library of Congress as being "culturally, historically or aesthetically significant."

== Sequels and adaptations ==
The success of The Karate Kid spawned three more films, including two direct sequels, starting with The Karate Kid Part II in 1986. Picking up where the first film left off, the film sees Daniel accompany Miyagi on a trip to Okinawa, where he is reunited with loved ones and is challenged by an old adversary. Although a commercial success, it received mixed reviews. The Karate Kid Part III followed in 1989, which saw Kreese seek revenge on Daniel and Miyagi with the help of new allies. It was criticized for rehashing elements of the first two films. Another sequel, The Next Karate Kid (1994), was the first in the series not to include Macchio, although Morita returned as Miyagi. It follows Hilary Swank as one of his new students. A remake of the original film, also titled The Karate Kid, was released in 2010. Set in Beijing, it starred Jackie Chan and Jaden Smith and received generally favorable reviews.

Aside from the film series, an animated series based on the film, also called The Karate Kid, aired on NBC in the fall of 1989. Consisting of thirteen episodes, the series abandoned the karate tournament motif and followed Daniel and Miyagi, voiced by Joey Dedio and Robert Ito, respectively, in an adventure/quest setting.

A sequel live-action television series, Cobra Kai, debuted in 2018. Created by Josh Heald, Jon Hurwitz and Hayden Schlossberg, it stars Macchio and Zabka, who reprise their roles as LaRusso and Lawrence, respectively. Set 34 years later, Cobra Kai re-examines the "Miyagi-Verse" narrative from Johnny's point of view, his decision to reopen the Cobra Kai dojo, and the rekindling of his old rivalry with Daniel. The series draws upon all of the sequels, as well as the original film. The series also pays tribute to Morita, who died in 2005. After a guest appearance in the show's first season, Kove reprised his role as John Kreese starting in the second season, while Shue reprised her role as Ali Mills in the series' third season, and Thomas Ian Griffith as Terry Silver (from Part III) in the fourth and fifth seasons.

In January 2020, a musical theatre adaptation of The Karate Kid was revealed to be in development. Amon Miyamoto served as the director, with an accompanying novel being written by the original film's screenwriter Robert Mark Kamen. Drew Gasparini is the lyricist and composer of the score, while Keone and Mari Madrid choreographed the musical. The premiere cast included Jovanni Sy as Mr. Miyagi, John Cardoza as Daniel, Kate Baldwin as Lucille, Alan H. Green as John Kreese, Jake Bentley Young as Johnny, Jetta Juriansz as Ali Mills, and Luis-Pablo Garcia as Freddie Fernandez. The adaption debuted in St. Louis in June 2022.

In August 2023, it was reported that Jackie Chan would reprise his role from the 2010 film in a new "Karate Kid" film. By November of the same year, Chan officially joined the cast alongside Ralph Macchio in their respective roles as Mr. Han and Daniel. The studio announced a world-wide open casting call for an actor to star as the movie's iteration of the titular character. Jonathan Entwistle would serve as director from a script written by Rob Lieber, where the plot would involve a teen from China moving to the east coast and beginning to study martial arts. Karen Rosenfelt would produce the film, with principal photography scheduled to commence in spring 2024. Originally scheduled to be released on June 7, 2024, the film was delayed to May 30, 2025, in part as a result of the 2023 writers and actors strikes.

== Book ==
In 2022, Ralph Macchio published the memoir Waxing On: The Karate Kid and Me (Dutton), in which he reflects upon the making of and legacy of the Karate Kid films and Cobra Kai.

== See also ==
- Blonde versus brunette rivalry
- Shoot Away, an arcade game that Ali and her friends play at an arcade.
