= Running Wild =

Running Wild or Runnin' Wild may refer to:

== Film and television ==
- Running Wild (1927 film), a silent film directed by Gregory La Cava and starring W. C. Fields
- Running Wild (1955 film), a crime drama starring William Campbell and Mamie Van Doren
- Running Wild (1973 film), a Western starring Lloyd Bridges
- Running Wild (1995 film), a South African film starring Brooke Shields and Martin Sheen
- Running Wild (1998 film), a family adventure film starring Gregory Harrison and Lori Hallier
- Running Wild (2006 film), a South Korean film
- Running Wild, a 2015 film featuring Jack Quaid
- Running Wild (2017 film), an American film featuring Sharon Stone
- Running Wild (1954 TV series), a British TV series starring Morecambe and Wise
- Running Wild (1987 TV series), a British sitcom starring Ray Brooks and Michelle Collins
- "Running Wild" (Queen of Swords), an episode of Queen of Swords
- Running Wild with Bear Grylls, a 2014 NBC TV series with Bear Grylls

== Music ==
- Running Wild (album), a 1985 album by Girlschool
- Running Wild (band), a German heavy metal band
- "Running Wild" (Jin song), 2024
- "Running Wild", a song by Judas Priest from Killing Machine
- "Running Wild", a song by Roxy Music from Flesh and Blood (Roxy Music album)
- "Running Wild", a song by The Soup Dragons from Hotwired
- "Running Wild Blues", a song by Charley Patton
- "Runnin' Wild" (1922 song), a song written by A. H. Gibbs, Joe Grey, and Leo Wood
- Runnin' Wild, a 1923 Broadway musical with music by James P. Johnson
- Runnin' Wild (Airbourne album), 2007
  - "Runnin' Wild" (Airbourne song), the title song
- "Runnin' Wild", a song by Soul Assassins from Chapter 1
- Runnin' Wild (Tony Rice album), 2001

== Other media ==
- Running Wild (novella), a 1988 novella by J. G. Ballard
- Running Wild (video game), a 1998 racing game for the PlayStation
- Running Wild (novel), a 2009 children's book by Michael Morpurgo

== See also ==
- Running Wilde, an American television series
