= No Way But the Hard Way =

Single by Airbourne

from the album No Guts. No Glory.
- Released: 8 February 2010
- Genre: Hard rock
- Length: 3:34
- Label: Roadrunner (US); EMI (Australia)
- Songwriters: Joel O'Keeffe, Ryan O'Keeffe
- Producer: Johnny K

Airbourne singles chronology
"Diamond in the Rough" (2007)	"No Way But the Hard Way" (2010)	"Blonde, Bad and Beautiful" (2010)

"No Way But the Hard Way" is a song by Australian hard rock band Airbourne and the first single from their album No Guts. No Glory.

== Music video ==
The music video of the song features scenes of the band in the Dinosaur Records building in Los Angeles, smashing and destroying the furniture and playing on the roof. The music video was directed by Sum 41 drummer Steve Jocz.

The video clip was shot in Sydney, Australia on the roof of the Accor Pullman Hotel, Homebush, Sydney Olympic Park, New South Wales State, Australia.

== Personnel ==
- Joel O'Keeffe - lead vocals, lead guitar
- David Roads - rhythm guitar, backing vocals
- Justin Street - bass, backing vocals
- Ryan O'Keeffe - drums, percussion

== Charts ==
Chart (2010)	Peak position
U.S. Billboard Mainstream Rock Tracks	29
