= I Love You, Beth Cooper (film) =

2009 film by Chris Columbus

- Theatrical release poster
- Directed by: Chris Columbus
- Screenplay by: Larry Doyle
- Based on: I Love You, Beth Cooper by Larry Doyle
- Produced by: Chris Columbus; Mark Radcliffe; Michael Barnathan
- Starring: Hayden Panettiere; Paul Rust; Jack Carpenter; Lauren London
- Cinematography: Phil Abraham
- Edited by: Peter Honess
- Music by: Christophe Beck
- Production companies: 1492 Pictures; The Bridge Studios; Ingenious Film Partners; Fox Atomic
- Distributed by: 20th Century Fox
- Release date: July 10, 2009
- Running time: 102 minutes
- Country: United States
- Language: English
- Budget: $18 million
- Box office: $16.4 million

I Love You, Beth Cooper is a 2009 American teen romantic comedy film directed by Chris Columbus and starring Hayden Panettiere and Paul Rust. It is based on the novel by Larry Doyle, with Doyle also writing the film's screenplay.

I Love You, Beth Cooper was released by 20th Century Fox on July 10, 2009. The film was panned for its acting, humor, and Columbus' direction, and underperformed at the box office, grossing $16.4 million against an $18 million budget.

== Plot ==
On graduation day at Buffalo Glenn High School, valedictorian Denis Cooverman confesses his love for head cheerleader and long time crush, beautiful Beth Cooper, in his speech while also taunting vain rich girl Valli, ignorant bully Greg, and Beth's Army soldier boyfriend Kevin; and urging his best friend Rich to finally admit he is gay. Afterwards, Denis invites Beth and her friends, Cammy and Treece, to a party he has planned at his house.

At Denis's house, his parents leave but not before his father revealing that he has condoms upstairs if he needs them. The girls (Beth and her two best friends) arrive at Denis's house for the party. Kevin and his Hummer soon come barging in, with his Army buddies Dustin and Sean, vowing revenge on Denis. They wreck the kitchen attempting to beat Denis up, but the five teenagers escape in Beth's Echo.

They drive to a gas station hoping to get beer, but the clerk will not accept Beth's fake ID, which states that she is 37. Beth successfully bribes the clerk with a kiss, which makes Denis realize that she is not who he thinks she is.

The group starts a bonfire in an isolated section of town where Rich, Cammy, and Treece are chased by a stampede of cows after trying to tip one over. When Denis puts on the KISS song "Beth", Beth tells him that she was named after the song. Denis thinks it is cool that Beth has two "headbangers" for parents. Beth slowly warms to Denis, becoming aware that he genuinely loves her, much to her amazement.

They all jump in the Echo and Beth, a reckless driver, drives without lights. They stumble upon Denis's parents, having sex in their car, by almost crashing into them. Rather than facing Denis's father with his pants down, Beth drives them away unseen, going to a private party at Valli's house. Kevin and his friends track them there, and Kevin challenges Denis to a fight. Greg briefly overpowers the three, in defense of Denis, then Beth crashes Kevin's Hummer through the front of Valli's house and rescues her four friends.

Beth takes them to their vacant school, entering with her head cheerleader key. After showcasing their cheerleading routine, Beth decides that they should all shower in the girls' locker room. Just as Denis is undressing to join the others, Kevin and his buddies arrive in the Echo and jump Denis again. Rich attacks the thugs in a towel whipping 'duel', as he has been training for years after being towel whipped as a young kid. Rich towel-whips them unconscious down a flight of stairs, then the kids flee in the Echo, going to Treece's family cabin. Rich, Treece, and Cammy have a threesome, while Beth and Denis enjoy the sun rise and finally share their first kiss.

They return to Denis' house, where his father is delighted to see he has 'hooked up', but makes him aware he still needs to be punished for leaving the house a wreck. Beth says goodbye, gives Denis a kiss, and touchingly thanks him for loving her. Denis tells her "what's not to love" and that she mustn't forget that. They promise to reunite at their high school reunion and agree to marry if they are both still single.

After the girls leave, Rich proclaims to Denis that he might be gay after all, or perhaps bisexual, but jokes that after the threesome, he's still more heterosexual than Denis. Denis informs Rich that he will not wait until the reunion to talk to Beth again, and that he is going to ask her out on Facebook. Richard tells Denis that he should make a grand gesture by going to her house with a boom box (a reference to Say Anything...) and wait for her. They continue debating how Denis should go about asking Beth on a date.

== Cast ==
- Hayden Panettiere as Beth Cooper
- Paul Rust as Denis Cooverman
- Jack Carpenter as Rich Munsch
- Lauren London as Cammy
- Lauren Storm as Treece
- Shawn Roberts as Kevin
- Alan Ruck as Mr. C
- Anna Mae Wills as Patty Keck
- Cynthia Stevenson as Mrs. C
- Jared Keeso as Dustin
- Brendan Penny as Sean
- Marie Avgeropoulos as Valli Wooley
- Josh Emerson as Greg Saloga
- Billy Paskaruk as Party Guy #3

== Production ==
In early 2008, producers announced the novel I Love You, Beth Cooper would be made into a film, with actress Hayden Panettiere in the title role. Filming began in 2008, with a release slated for July 10, 2009. The film was directed by Chris Columbus, with the screenplay written by Doyle.

Filming took place in Vancouver, British Columbia, with scenes shot at Centennial Secondary School, Magee Secondary School and St. Patrick's Regional Secondary. Due to being filmed in a Canadian location during the winter despite its story set during the summertime, there were several difficulties when it came to the weather and the actors having to be in summer attire outside in cold temperatures; hoses occasionally had to be used to rid settings of snow.

The film's official website was launched on February 14, 2009, with a Valentine's Day themed "personalize your own trailer and e-card" widget that allowed for customization of the trailer and that could be sent to loved ones, friends and family.

The film was produced and originally to be released by Fox specialty subsidiary Fox Atomic, but theatrical distribution reverted to 20th Century Fox after Atomic folded in April 2009.

== Soundtrack ==
The soundtrack album was released on June 23, 2009.

No.	Title	Artist	Length
1.	"Forget Me"	Violet Columbus	2:50
2.	"Try It Again"	The Hives	3:30
3.	"Come Out of the Shade"	The Perishers	3:58
4.	"Sway"	The Kooks	3:35
5.	"Last Kiss"	Christophe Beck	2:44
6.	"Catch Me If You Can"	Gym Class Heroes	5:08
7.	"Too Much, Too Young, Too Fast"	Airbourne	3:43
8.	"A Good Idea at the Time"	OK Go	3:12
9.	"Beth Cooper Suite"	Christophe Beck	4:41
10.	"Beth"	Kiss	2:46
11.	"Cruisin'"	Smokey Robinson	5:54
12.	"Who Knew?"	Christophe Beck	1:07
13.	"Feels Like the First Time"	Foreigner	3:51
14.	"School's Out"	Alice Cooper	3:30
15.	"Forget Me"	Eleni Mandell	3:13

== Reception ==
=== Box office ===
In its opening weekend (July 10–12), the film grossed $4,919,433 at 1,858 theaters, which was enough for seventh place. The film grossed $14,800,725 at the domestic box office and $1,581,813 in other territories, and it finished its worldwide theatrical run with a total of $16,382,538.

=== Critical response ===
On Rotten Tomatoes, 14% of 119 critics have given the film a positive review, and an average rating of 3.6/10. The site's consensus states: "Heavily reliant on stereotypes and shallow teen comedy clichés, I Love You, Beth Cooper is a humorless affair that fails to capture the charm of its source novel." On Metacritic, which calculated an average score of 32 out of 100 from 30 critics, the film received "generally unfavorable" reviews. Audiences surveyed by CinemaScore gave the film a "B−" grade on a scale of A to F. Critics described the film as "puerile and uninspiring nonsense," "lacking in charm, tempo and warmth of any kind," and "starved and lethally bland", while some critics, such as Peter Bradshaw and Roger Ebert, called it an average teen comedy.

Frequent criticisms were towards what were considered flat performances. Simon Foster bashed the film as a star vehicle for Panettiere; Cinematical.com found her unconvincing as a rebellious girl, while Kaleem Aftab of The National opined that she made the character look more like a "spoiled brat". "She's photogenic, granted, but dimensionless and has minimal screen presence—the final reel about-face that is synonymous with these types of films rings as false as a plastic bell", wrote Foster. According to Thomas Leupp of Hollywood.com, "Panettiere is appealing as a bright-eyed cheerleader whose perky exterior hides a bad-girl streak, but she doesn't quite project that unattainable quality the role seems to call for. She's more like the superhot girl-next-door who you think is attainable but probably isn't."

Time Out London elaborated about the acting overall that "lines fall flat thanks to long pauses and hammy delivery." Leupp commented that Rust "attempts to compensate for the flat material he's given by overplaying virtually every joke—to the point at which you'll actually root for his antagonists to pummel him without mercy." The inclusion of a Ferris Bueller's Day Off lead as Denis' father also ticked off reviewers.

However, Carpenter and Rust's presences received some positive comments, particularly their chemistry together; in fact, The Independent's Anthony Quinn wrote that Rust and Carpenter were the only reasons to watch the film. "One of the film's running gags—that Rich is gay but won't admit, even to himself, what everybody knows—is uncommonly heartfelt because of the way the actors handle the situation. In most movies you have to take for granted that the buddies really are buddies. Not here," wrote Peter Rainer of The Christian Science Monitor. Reiner additionally claimed that "in his first starring role, [Rust] shows off the crack timing of a seasoned pro."

When it came to characters, the stereotypical lead male (in Aftab's view) of Denis Cooverman was the most criticized. According to Foster, he's "game but drawn so broadly he never amounts to more than a comic foil, well below the romantic lead the film asks him to become." Time Out London called him "a truly ungainly specimen with little to offer [...] other than novelty value and infatuation." The character of Rich Munsch was criticized by Empire writer William Thomas, who wrote that his arc "is treated so simplistically that it might offend even Bruno" and has "a character tic (he constantly quotes movie dialogue, complete with the film name, director and year of release) thats so annoying you want to say, 'This has all been just a big mistake.'"

The film's humor was panned. Brought-up examples in reviews included the tampon nosebleed scene, Rich's referencing of movie quotes, an off-screen threesome, a Star Wars lightsaber fight, a moment where a character steps in cow poop, and "all comedy pratfalls followed by some excruciating silences where you're meant to be laughing." While Columbus' dip into edgier material was applauded by The Independent's Anthony Quinn, it wasn't by Thomas, who unfavorably labeled it a "curiously chaste affair [...] that feels curiously unsure of itself, as if Columbus wants to take that extra step into slightly raunchier, Risky Business-style material, but just can't bring himself to." Rainer and Can Mag writer Fred Topel were turned off by the film's comic portrayal of life-endangering situations, such as sequences depicting Beth's poor driving skills.

Some reviewers negatively compared I Love You, Beth Cooper to other 1980s-teen-movie-styled products. Simon Foster strongly disliked its removal of the genre's traditional "all-important sweetness": "It is not a step forward in teen movie scriptwriting to expose a school bully's history as a sexual abuse victim for mirth, or to make a running gag out of one student's closeted homosexuality, nor pitch the felonious actions of the blonde teen queen as the height of coolness." In the mind of Allan Hunter of the Daily Express, "the mixture of obvious jokes and winsome sentiment pretty much robs the film of any guilty pleasure value it might have provided." Some reviewers thought the only good scene was its opening, Leupp reasoning that it "shows the potential to be something sly and clever." Topel suggested the script had "some clever ideas," but they were ruined by Columbus' "telegraphed" directing style. The film's slow pacing was also criticized.

In more positive reviews, Rainer, while suggesting I Love You, Beth Cooper was derivative for a Doyle script, also opined it to be better than most other teen films for its "unnaturally lush and woodsy," setting, unique premise, and rejection of a "handy" moral promoting traditionalism: "it doesn't take us long to figure out that Beth is more than a bimbo. Or to put it another way, she's a bimbo with heart. She's drawn to Denis because he adores her for who she is rather than (or in addition to) how she looks." Lisa Schwarzbaum of Entertainment Weekly considered its story "pleasantly low-key" and essentially timeless.
