= Get Back Up =

Get Back Up may refer to:

- "Get Back Up" (T.I. song)
- "Get Back Up" (TobyMac song)
- "Get Back Up", a song by Airbourne from Breakin' Outta Hell
- Get Back Up, a 2020 documentary film about the band Blue October
- "Get back up" (G-Eazy song)
