= Airbourne (band) =

Australian hard rock band

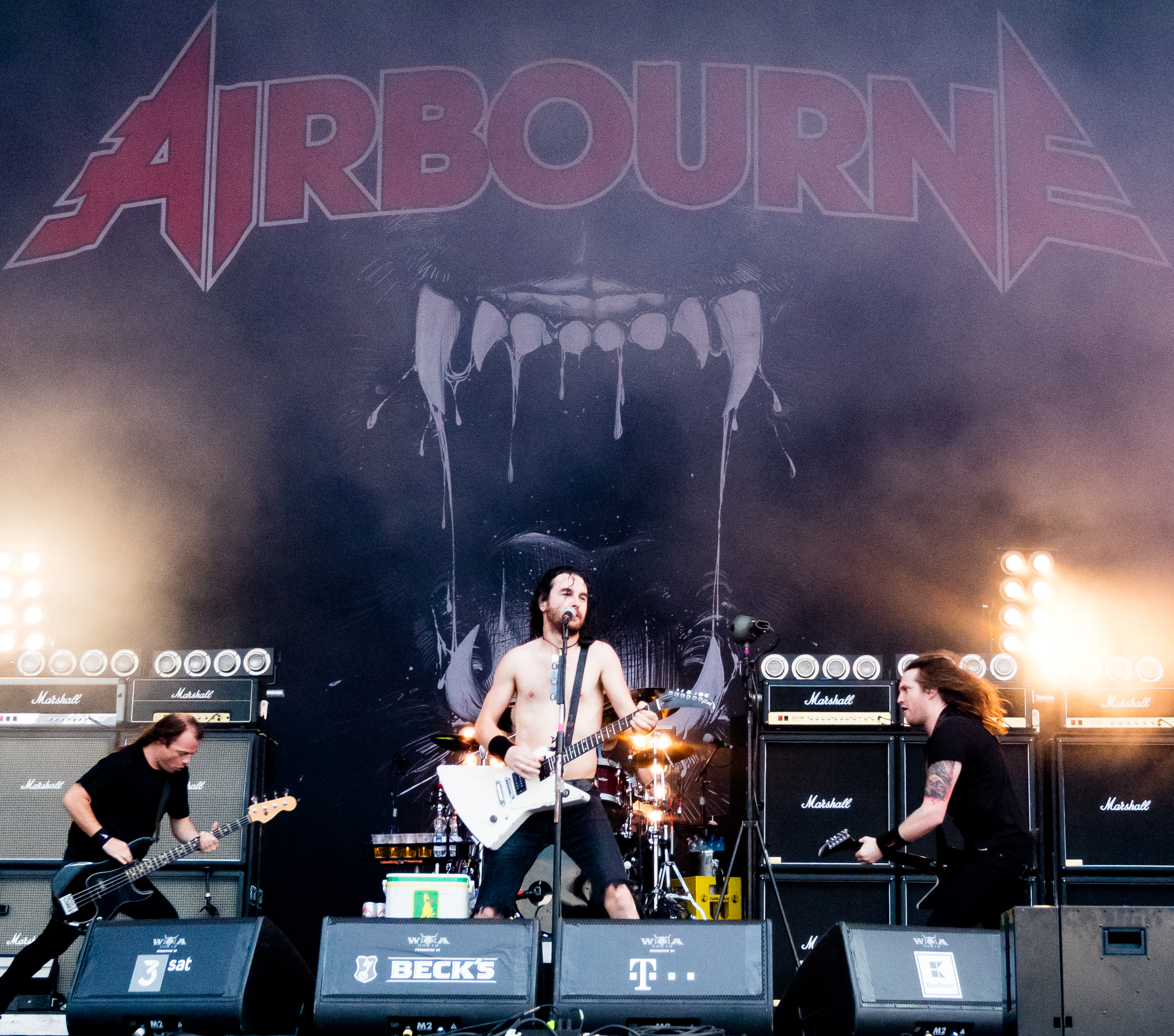
- Airbourne performing at Wacken Open Air 2019

Background information
- Also known as: Airborne
- Origin: Warrnambool, Victoria, Australia
- Genres: Hard rock; heavy metal
- Years active: 2001–present
- Labels: Capitol/EMI; Roadrunner; Caroline; Nettwerk; Universal/Spinefarm
- Members: Joel O'Keeffe; Ryan O'Keeffe; Justin Street; Brett Tyrrell
- Past members: Luke McKenzie; Adam Jacobson; David Roads; Matthew Harrison; Jarrad Morrice
- Website: airbournerock.com

Airbourne are an Australian hard rock band formed in Warrnambool, Victoria, in late 2001. Founding members are Joel O'Keeffe (lead vocals and lead guitar) and younger brother Ryan O'Keeffe (drums), with long-term member David Roads (rhythm guitar and backing vocals) commencing by end of 2002. They were joined by Justin Street (bass guitar and backing vocals) in mid-2004. Roads amicably left in 2017, Matthew Harrison joined in 2018 and was replaced by Jarrad Morrice (rhythm guitar and backing vocals) in mid-2022, who was replaced in turn by Brett Tyrrell in mid-2023.

The band's debut album, Runnin' Wild (2007), peaked in the top 30 on the ARIA Albums Chart. It appeared on the United Kingdom Albums Chart and United States Billboard 200. By August 2013, it was certified with a silver award by BPI. Their second album, No Guts. No Glory. (2010) reached the top 20 on the ARIA Chart, top 40 in the UK, top 5 in Germany and also appeared on the Billboard 200. Their third studio album, Black Dog Barking (2013), also reached top 5 in Germany. In 2016, Airbourne released their fourth album, Breakin' Outta Hell, which peaked at No. 3 in Germany. Boneshaker (2019), the band's fifth studio album, appeared in the German top 10.

== History ==
=== Formation and Ready to Rock (2001–2006) ===
The band logo

Airbourne formed as a hard rock trio (initially styled as Airborne) in late 2001 in the Victorian city of Warrnambool by Joel O'Keeffe (born 1982 or 1983) on lead vocals and lead guitar, his younger brother Ryan (born 1985 or 1986) on drums, and Luke "Macca" McKenzie on bass guitar. Joel had played guitar since the age of 11 and Ryan got his first drum kit four years later also at the age of 11. At 17 years old, Joel provided guitar for the boys' father Dennis's vocal performance in January 2000, with their mother Anne on bodhran and vocals, and uncle Colin on tin whistle and vocals.

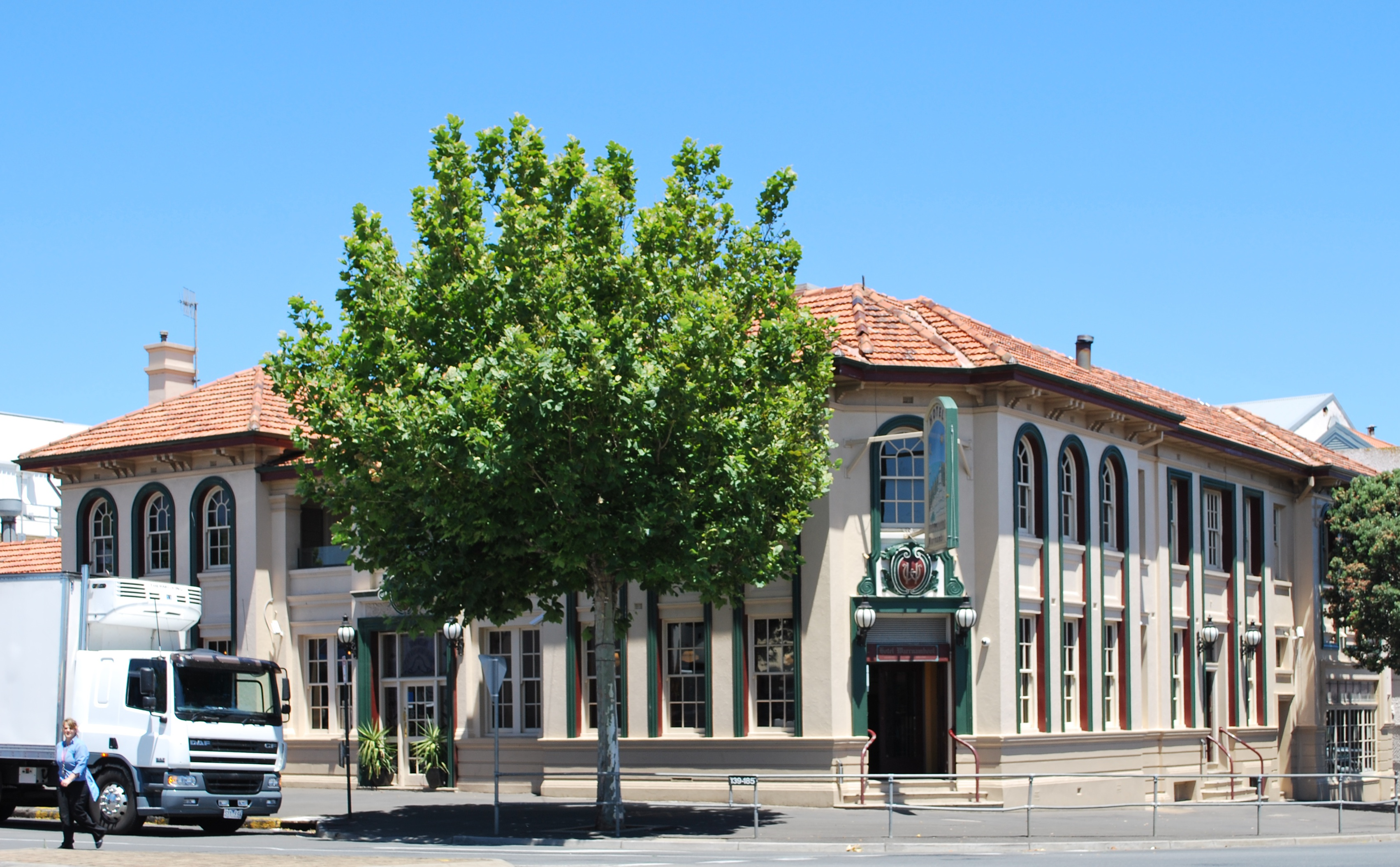
Hotel Warrnambool, where Joel O'Keeffe met David Roads, who joined Airbourne.

On 27 April 2002 Airborne performed at the Koroit Irish Festival – they provided their "big guitar sound" on the Devondale stage in the town's main street. In November of that year, Warrnambool City Council and Arts Victoria released a Various Artists' sampler album, Hard Wired: Youth Compilation Album. Airborne provided two tracks, "Rock 'n' Roll" and "Give It all You've Got", which were recorded at Motherlode Studios, Warrnambool, earlier in the year. The CD was given away to local students as well as 300 additional copies provided, "to help further the careers of the eight bands... [get them] airplay and gigs outside Warrnambool." Also in November, Airborne won regional finals in the Push Start band competition.

Adam Jacobson (left) on bass guitar, Warrnambool in 2004.

Joel met David Roads (born c. 1983) when the two worked at the Hotel Warrnambool during late 2002. The pair brought their guitars to work and, after their shifts, jammed on song ideas. Roads was asked to join the group on rhythm guitar and they rehearsed at the O'Keeffes' home. Adam Jacobson joined on bass guitar early in 2003 and they played regular gigs at the local Criterion Hotel. In March of that year, as Airborne, the four-piece – Jacobson, the O'Keeffe brothers and Roads – were runners up in the statewide band competition, Push Start, in Melbourne. Their early material was influenced by Australian rock artists AC/DC, the Angels, Billy Thorpe and Rose Tattoo. Classic Rock magazine's reviewer described how they are, "shamelessly derivative and gloriously entertaining."

Due to bands in Scotland and New Zealand with the same name, the group inserted a "u" into their spelling in early 2004. As Airbourne, they recorded an eight-track extended play (EP), Ready to Rock, which appeared in July 2004 via Field Man Australia, an independent self-funded release. Recorded at Hot House Studios with the band producing while Frank mastered it at Moose Mastering, Richmond for Sik Kitty Production. It was only sold at gigs and by 2017 became, "highly collectable". Pedro B of Sputnikmusic rated it at 3.0 out-of 5, "A valiant first effort by a very young band, but marred by cheesy lyrics, repetition and excessive adherence to source material."

By the time the EP was issued Jacobson had been replaced by Justin Street (born c. 1986) on bass guitar. Ryan had met Street while stumbling home drunk from a party. In early 2005, the band relocated to Melbourne. Their talent manager, Gregg Donovan, handled the negotiations with four major record labels before they signed a five album record contract "for a seven-figure deal" with Capitol Records/EMI Music Australia in October. Initially the members shared a house, where they "lived off bare essentials like cans of baked beans and things like that. We played one gig a month. It was hard in the early days, building yourself up." The group supported Mötley Crüe, Motörhead, Iron Maiden and the Rolling Stones, as well as performing at summer music festivals.

=== Runnin' Wild (2006–2009) ===
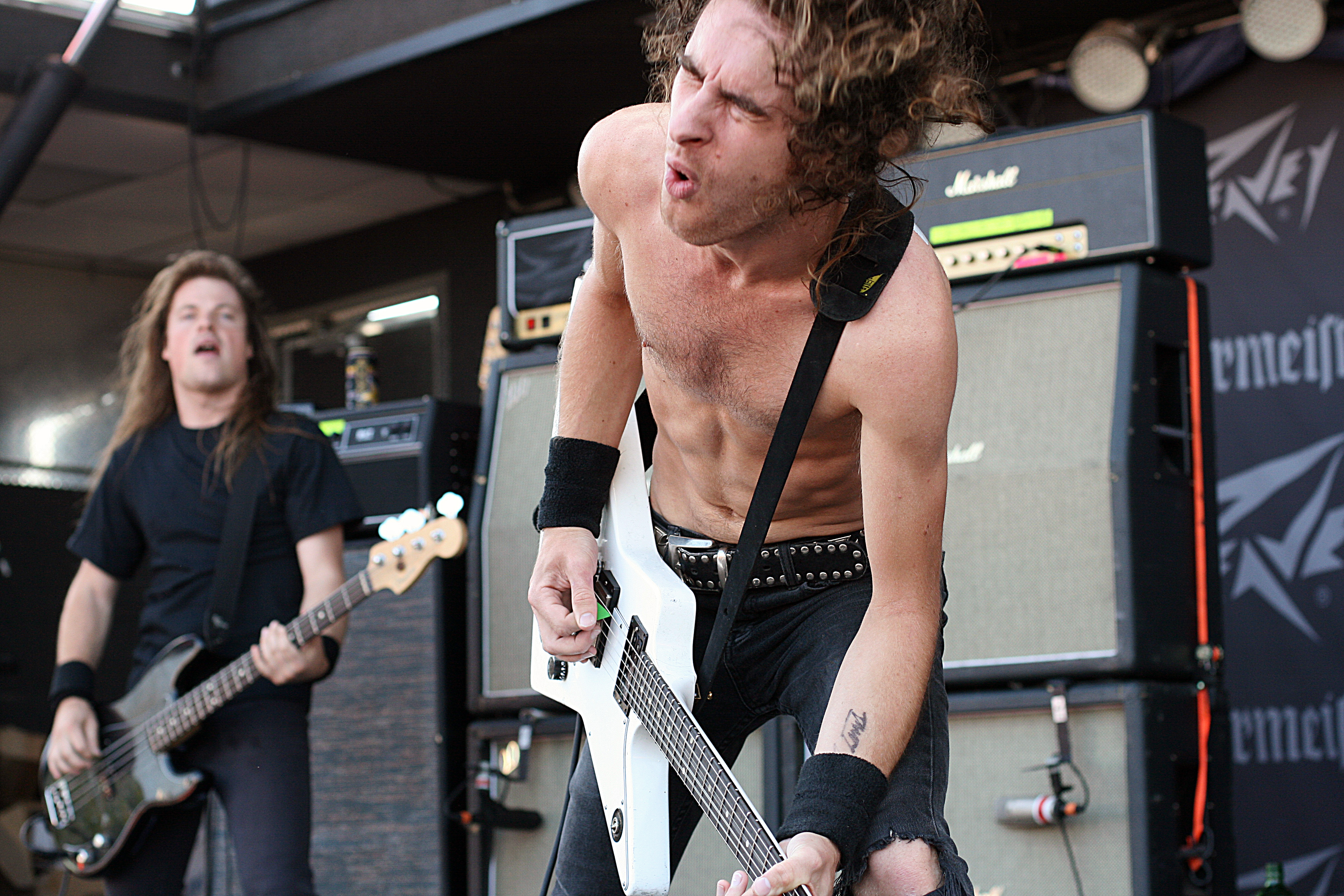
Bass player Justin Street (left) and Joel O'Keeffe on-stage, August 2008

In 2006 Airbourne travelled to the United States to work on their first studio album, Runnin' Wild, with producer Bob Marlette (Ozzy Osbourne, Alice Cooper). Runnin' Wild was released in Australia on 23 June 2007. Three singles were issued from the album, "Runnin' Wild" (May), "Too Much, Too Young, Too Fast" (June), a playable track on Guitar Hero World Tour; and "Diamond in the Rough" (September). In February Capitol Records culled 70% of their artist roster including cancelling their contract with Airbourne, but the album was still issued in Australia via EMI. In June the band signed with Roadrunner Records for international distribution.

The album peaked at No. 21 on the ARIA Albums Chart in Australia, top 40 on New Zealand's RIANZ Albums Chart and appeared on charts in Austria, Switzerland and France. The group signed a publishing deal in May 2007 with Artwerk Publishing, a joint venture between Nettwerk and EA Games, where the group "will be featured in multiple global EA games later this year." the.Dwarf.com.au's Andrea Batz reviewed the album, "If AC/DC had a son it would be called Airbourne with a little doubt thrown in if the milkman was Iron Maiden!" Batz expanded, "A definite no-holds-barred feast of wreckless, yet well-organised rocker's bliss. Neat and tidy, simple and clean yet filthy, dirty, sexy and gritty. A formula that has evaded artists for quite some time."

During late 2007 the group toured the US supporting Kid Rock and Korn. In September 2007 they issued a five-track live EP, Live at the Playroom. At the ARIA Music Awards of 2007 they were nominated for Best Rock Album and Breakthrough Artist – Album for Runnin' Wild. It was issued in North America, Europe and Japan in January 2008, after which Airbourne relocated to the US. The album reached the Top 100 on the UK Albums Chart and appeared on the Billboard 200.

In a September 2008 interview with Axl Rosenburg and Vince Neilstein of MetalSucks, Joel discussed comparisons with AC/DC, "whoever you are when you come out, especially if you're from Australia and you sound like we do, you're going to get compared to anyone who is out there. It doesn't matter who you are, you are going to get compared to somebody. To be compared to the best rock and roll band in the business, who are still going today and are about to release another album, there is no higher compliment..." In November at the Astoria in London, Dan Hawkins (Stone Gods/The Darkness) joined Airbourne on stage to play the AC/DC song, "Whole Lotta Rosie".

=== No Guts. No Glory. (2009–2011) ===
Roads confirmed that in January 2009 Airbourne would enter the studio to begin recording their second album, No Guts. No Glory. In the 17 January issue of Kerrang! magazine, Joel revealed they had written tracks in the Criterion Hotel, "We're getting all our gear plugged in and getting set for Aussie pub rock written in an Aussie rock pub!" The album was produced by Johnny K, mixed by Mike Fraser, and was released on 8 March 2010 in the UK, Europe, Canada, Japan, Australia and New Zealand. The album reached the top 20 on the ARIA Albums Chart, and top 20 in Austria, New Zealand, Finland, Greece, Sweden and Switzerland, while in Germany it peaked at No. 4.

In the US it appeared on 20 April 2010. "Born to Kill", was first played live at the Logan Campbell Centre, Auckland, New Zealand in October 2009. In January 2010, another new song, "No Way But the Hard Way", was played on the BBC Radio 1's Rock Show. On 9 February it was available on iTunes, as the first single from the album. In the UK No Guts. No Glory. reached No. 31, while on the US Billboard 200 it peaked in the top 100. At the 2010 ARIA Music Awards it was nominated for Best Hard Rock or Heavy Metal Album. The band supported Iron Maiden on the UK leg of that group's Final Frontier World Tour from 20 July 2011 starting at Glasgow SECC Arena and ending at Cardiff Motorpoint Arena on 1 August 2011.

=== Black Dog Barking (2011–2014) ===
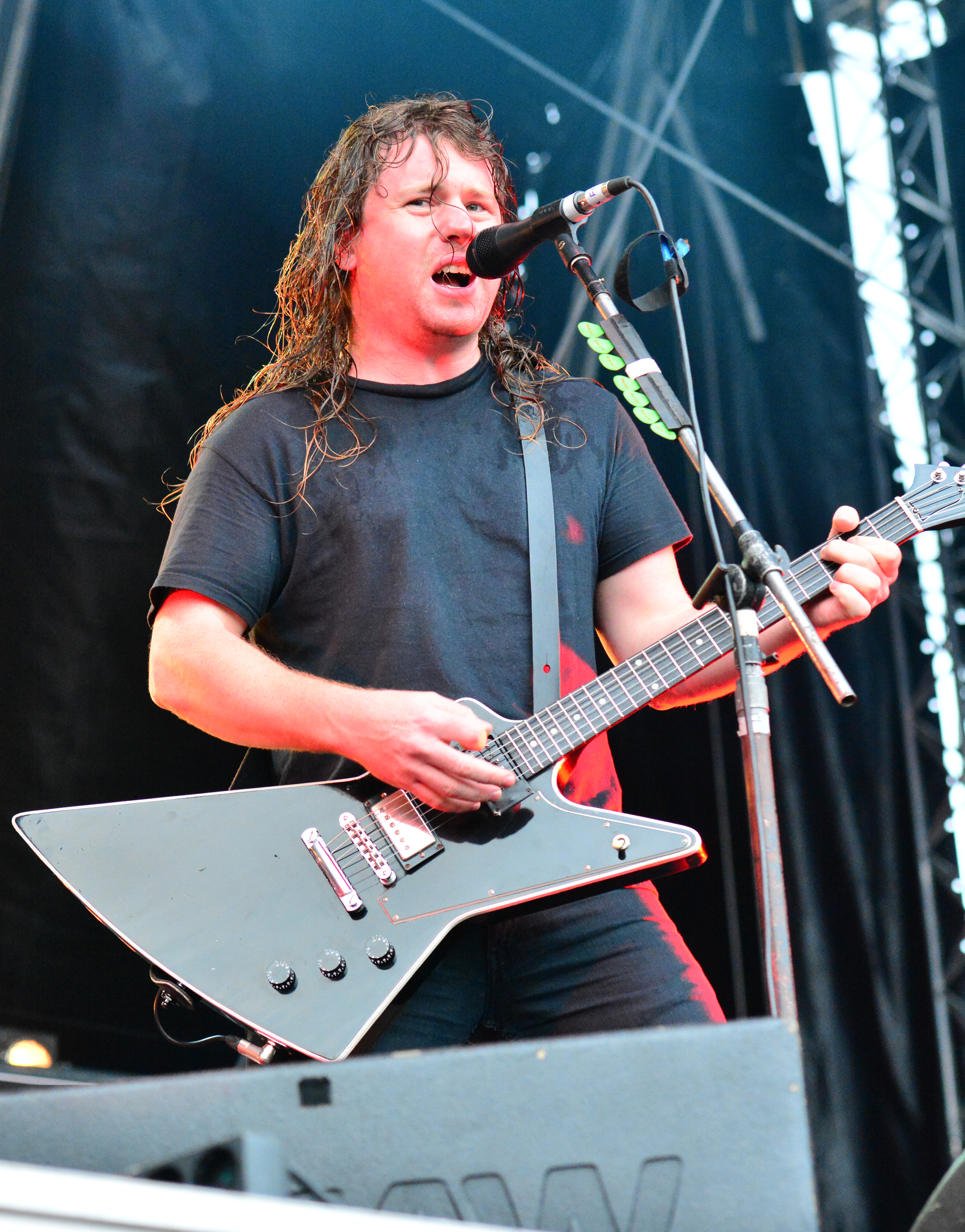
David Roads performing at Elbriot, January 2014.

From mid-2011 the band started working on their third studio album, Black Dog Barking. It was recorded at Van Howes Studio, Los Angeles, and The Armoury, Vancouver with Brian Howes producing and was released on 21 May 2013 via Roadrunner. The cover artwork was by Australian artists The Sharp Brothers, who had provided cover artwork for No Guts. No Glory. According to Roads, the title has "Black Dog" as a metaphor for the band's ability to break the rules, especially not to care for dB limits. It was their second album to get into the top 5 in Germany and peaked in top 20 in Australia, Austria, New Zealand, Sweden and Switzerland.

Review aggregator, Metacritic rated Black Dog Barking at 76/100 with a summary, "generally favorable reviews". Guardian Australia's Dom Lawson gave it four-out-of-five stars and explained they show, "[an] electrifying verve with which they attack their joyously simplistic songs... the ageless and tireless uniformity of the band's approach that makes this an honest and brazen delight." Kerrang!'s reviewer observed, "Very occasionally [sic] they come a school uniform away from impersonating their forefathers." Angus Young told that publication, "I really like Airbourne." Black Dog Barking was nominated for another ARIA Award for Best Hard Rock or Heavy Metal Album in 2013. At the end of that year Airbourne toured Europe, supported – amongst others – by the Swedish band Corroded.

=== Breakin' Outta Hell (2014–2019) ===
Joel revealed in November 2014 that the band were writing songs for their fourth studio album, Breakin' Outta Hell. In January of the following year, they signed for a worldwide deal with Spinefarm Records. Breakin' Outta Hell was released on 23 September 2016, which was recorded at Sing Sing Studios, Melbourne with Marlette producing again. Metacritic's score of 80/100 indicated, "generally favorable reviews" with Ian Fortnam of Classic Rock observing, "each track's feral combination of barbed-wire riffs, alcohol-numbed throat savagery, crotch-level bass and propulsive, pounding beats, your better judgement simply rolls its eyes as your feet drag you helpless to the dance floor."

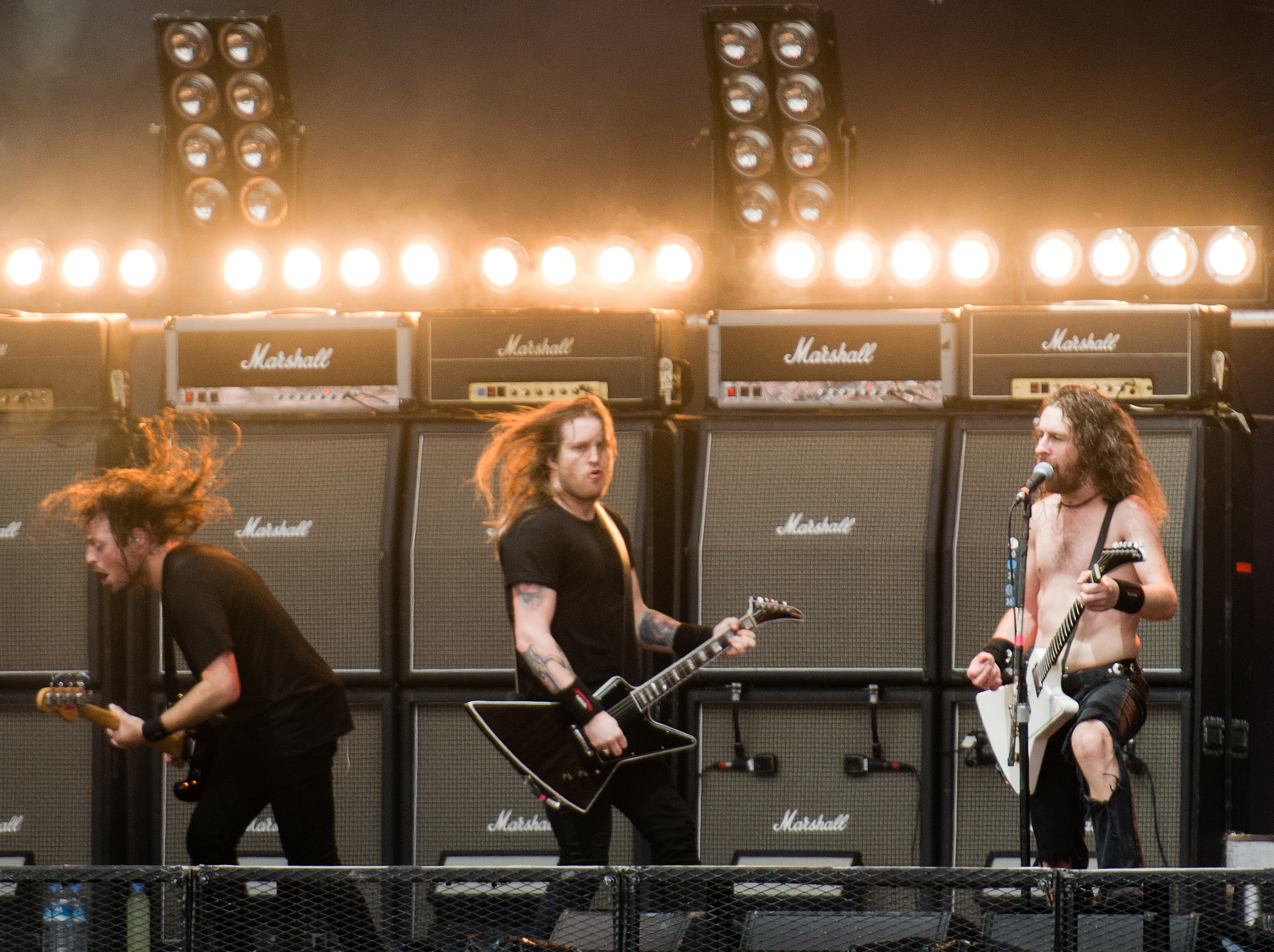
Airbourne in 2019: Street (left), Matt Harrison (centre) and Joel O'Keeffe (right).

The album is the group's highest charting in various countries: Australia at No. 13, Austria at No. 3, Germany at No. 3, Switzerland at No. 4 and UK at No. 9. It was also nominated for Best Hard Rock or Heavy Metal Album at the ARIA Music Awards of 2017. The title track was issued as a single on 8 July 2016.

On 7 April 2017, it was announced via the band's Facebook page that long-term rhythm guitarist David Roads would be leaving the band to work in his family business. Joel later explained, that after his years with the group "[he] was having a hard time out on the road, but he loved the fans, though – he loved playing. So now he's back on the farm [working in his family business] and he's happy as hell." Matt "Harri" Harrison (ex-Palace of the King) replaced Roads on rhythm guitar and backing vocals. To celebrate the 10th anniversary of Runnin' Wild, the group issued a compilation album, Diamond Cuts: The B-Sides, in September 2017. Two previously unreleased tracks, "Heavy Weight Lover" and "Money", were added. An associated box set of 4×CDs and a DVD, Diamond Cuts, was also released.

=== Boneshaker (2019–2024) ===
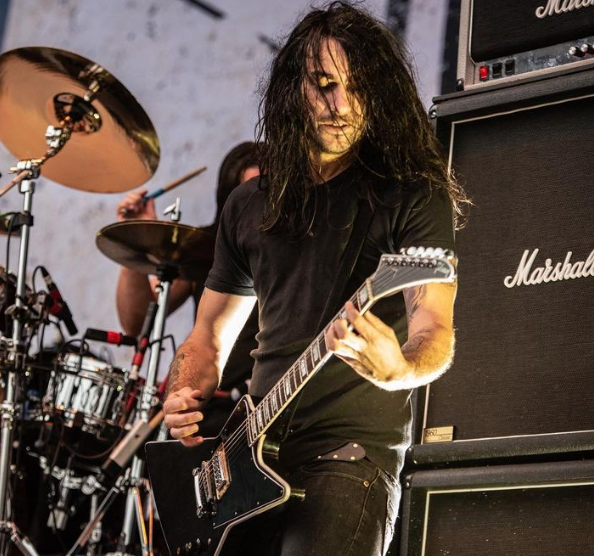
Jarrad Morrice on guitar, 2022

From March 2019 the band were recording their fifth studio album, Boneshaker, at RCA Studio A in Nashville, Tennessee with production by Dave Cobb. It was released on 25 October 2019, which reached top 10 in Germany and Switzerland, and top 20 in Australia and Austria. Hysteria Magazine's Kris Peters observed, "[they] have served up another meat and potatoes take on their beloved genre, following their now sacred formula of no ballads, no acoustic guitars and no keyboards... If you think rock n roll is dying in this country, spend half an hour with this album through your speakers and your doubts will be cast aside." However, The Soundboard's reviewer felt Airbourne, "exist in a time where genre regimentation has effectively been dissolved altogether, and sticking to so rigidly to one single reference point only shows more limitations than benefits on paper... It's effectively the fifth time they've made this exact album, rotating through their own tropes with the ease of a band more than content with spinning their wheels, because it'll yield a positive result from their fans regardless."

Harrison was replaced by Jarrad Morrice on rhythm guitar and backing vocals during mid-2022. The band were working on a new album expected in 2023. By September 2023 Morrice was replaced on rhythm guitar by Brett Tyrrell (ex-Thunderstruck).

=== Airbourne (2025–present) ===
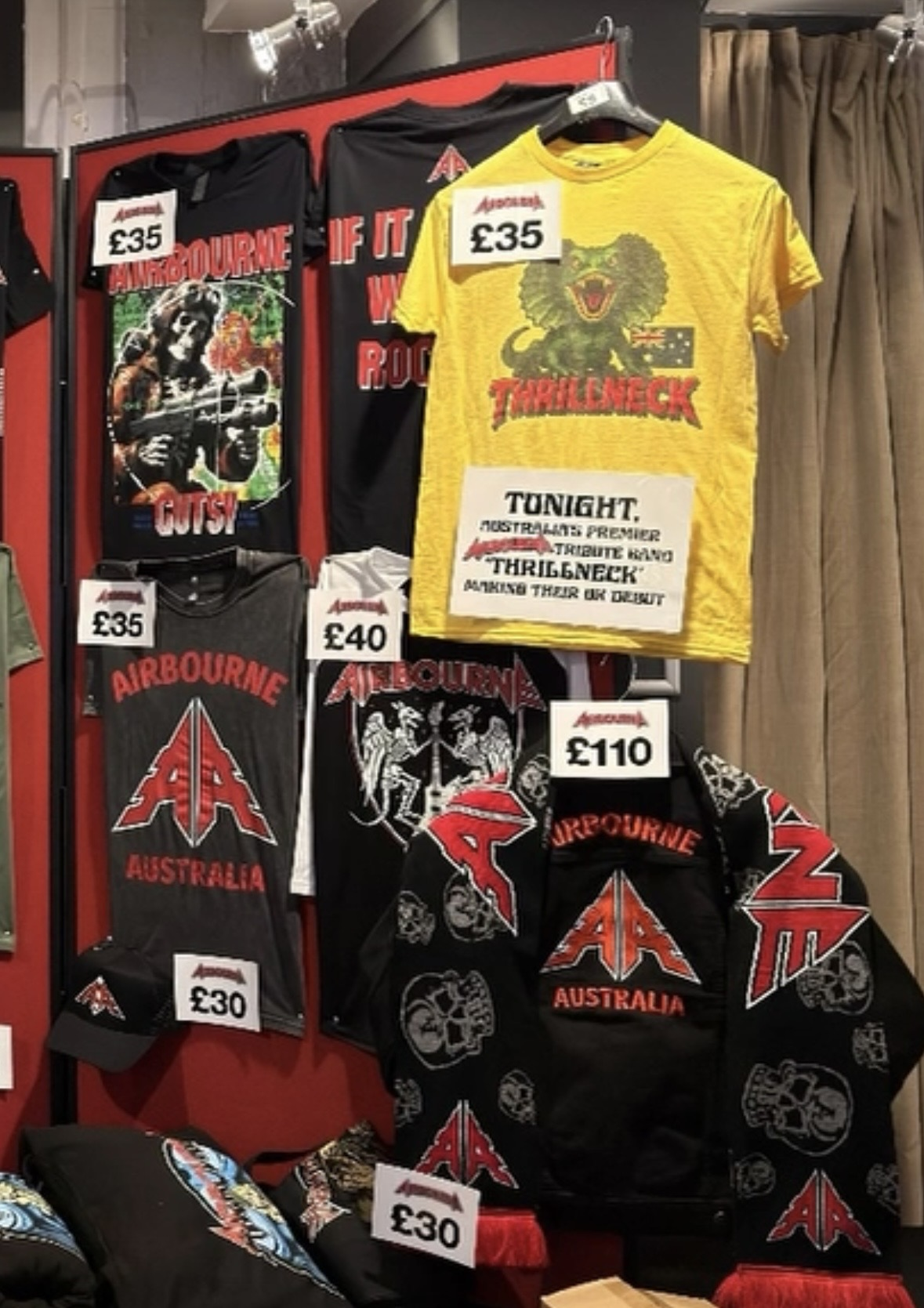
Thrillneck's shirt in Frome's merch booth, Gutsy tour 2026.

The band released a single, "Gutsy" (June 2025), through Spinefarm Records. The band indicated that their sixth studio album, Airbourne, had been recorded, which was provisionally titled, Gutsy. In early November 2025, Airbourne teased a Christmas-themed song on social media, which was released on 24 November, "Christmas Bonus".

During live performances on their 2026 Gutsy Tour, the band debuted the track, "Alive After Death (Last Plane Out)". In April 2026 it was issued as a single and they announced that their sixth album, would be self-titled and is due in August via Spinefarm. Its twelve tracks include the three singles, "Gutsy", "Christmas Bonus" and "Alive After Death (Last Plane Out)".

The album includes songwriting and/or production collaborations with Bryan Adams, Phil Collen, Mutt Lange and Brian Howes. The band incorporated humour into their live performances, including at a show in Frome, England where they referenced a fictional tribute act, Thrillneck, and sold themed merchandise, as a self-referential joke on their long-standing and relatively unchanged live set-lists.

== Influences ==
Airbourne's influences include AC/DC, Bad News, Def Leppard, Iron Maiden, Judas Priest, Pantera, Thin Lizzy, the Angels, Spinal Tap, Status Quo, Motörhead, Metallica, and Rose Tattoo.

== Members ==
Current members

- Joel O'Keeffe – lead vocals, lead guitar (2001–present)
- Ryan O'Keeffe – drums, percussion (2001–present)
- Justin Street "Streety" – bass guitar, backing vocals (2004–present)
- Brett "Bretty" Tyrrell – rhythm guitar, backing vocals (touring member 2023; full-time member 2023–present)

Former members

- Luke "Macca" McKenzie – bass guitar, backing vocals (2001–2003)
- David Roads "Roadsy" – rhythm guitar, backing vocals (2002–2017)
- Adam Jacobson – bass guitar, backing vocals (2003–2004)
- Matthew "Harri" Harrison – rhythm guitar, backing vocals (2017–2022)
- Jarrad "Jazz" Morrice – rhythm guitar, backing vocals (2022–2023)

Airbourne, band members at Rockharz 2026

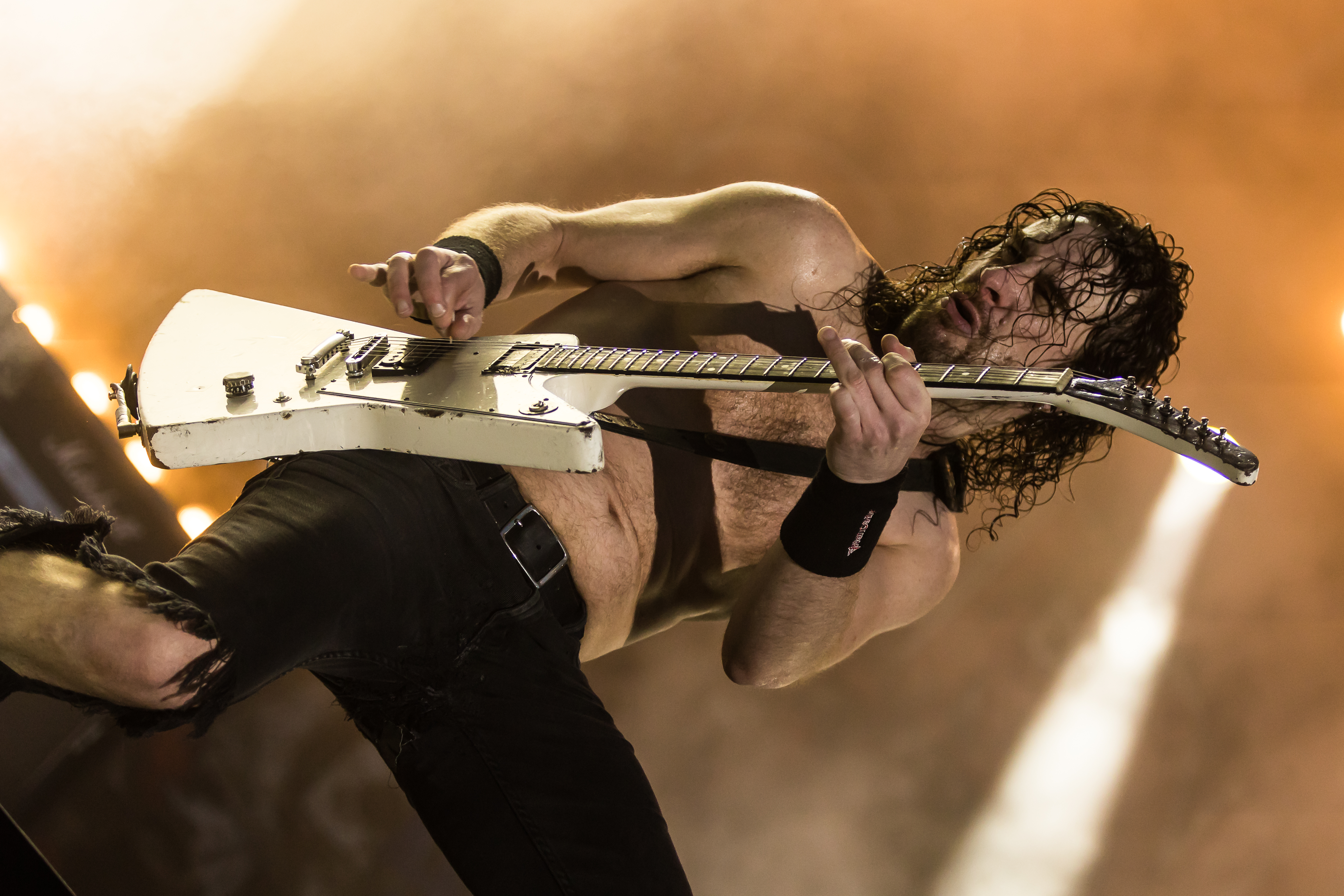
Joel O’Keeffe, vocals, lead guitar

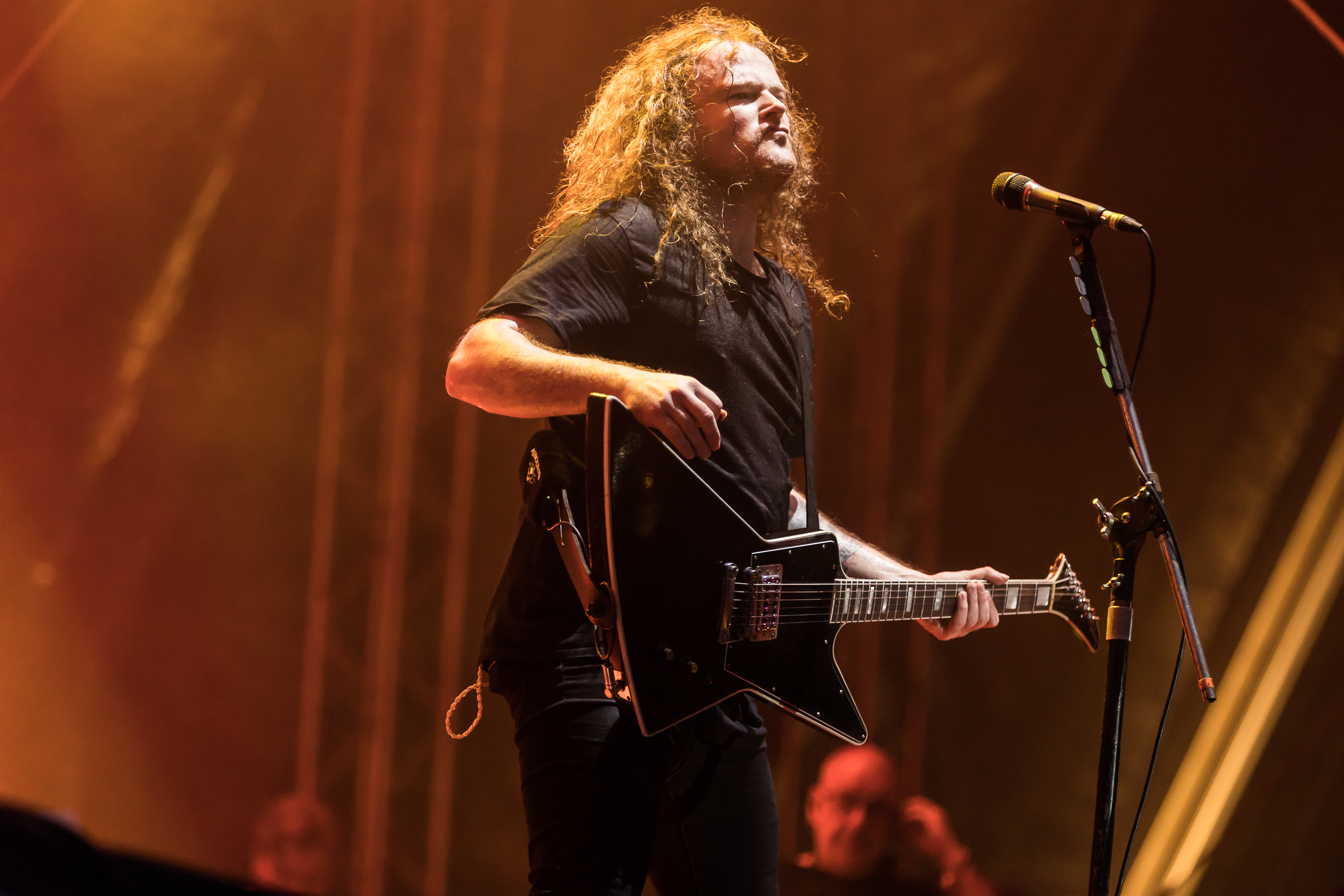
Brett Tyrell, rhythm guitar

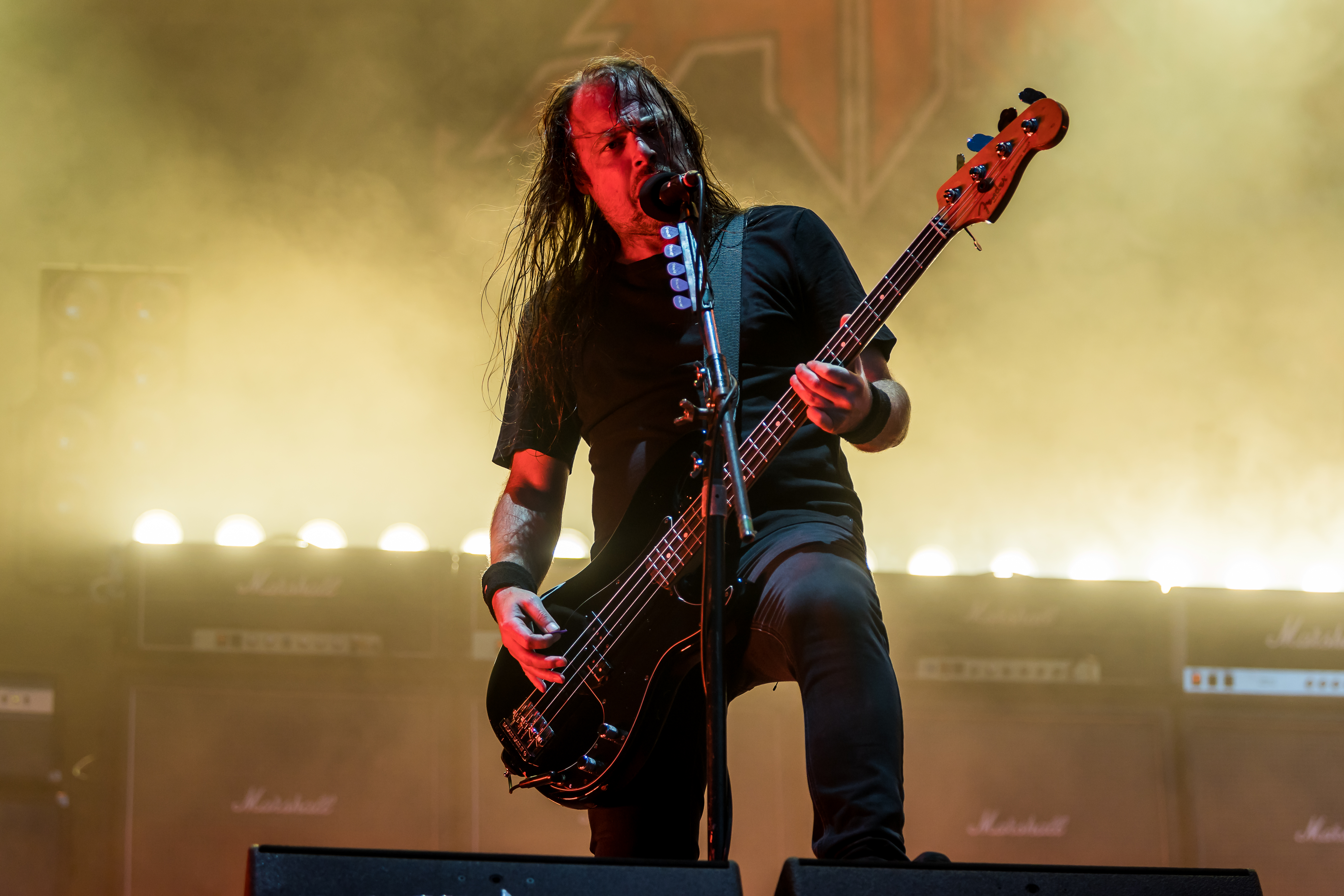
Justin Street, bass guitar

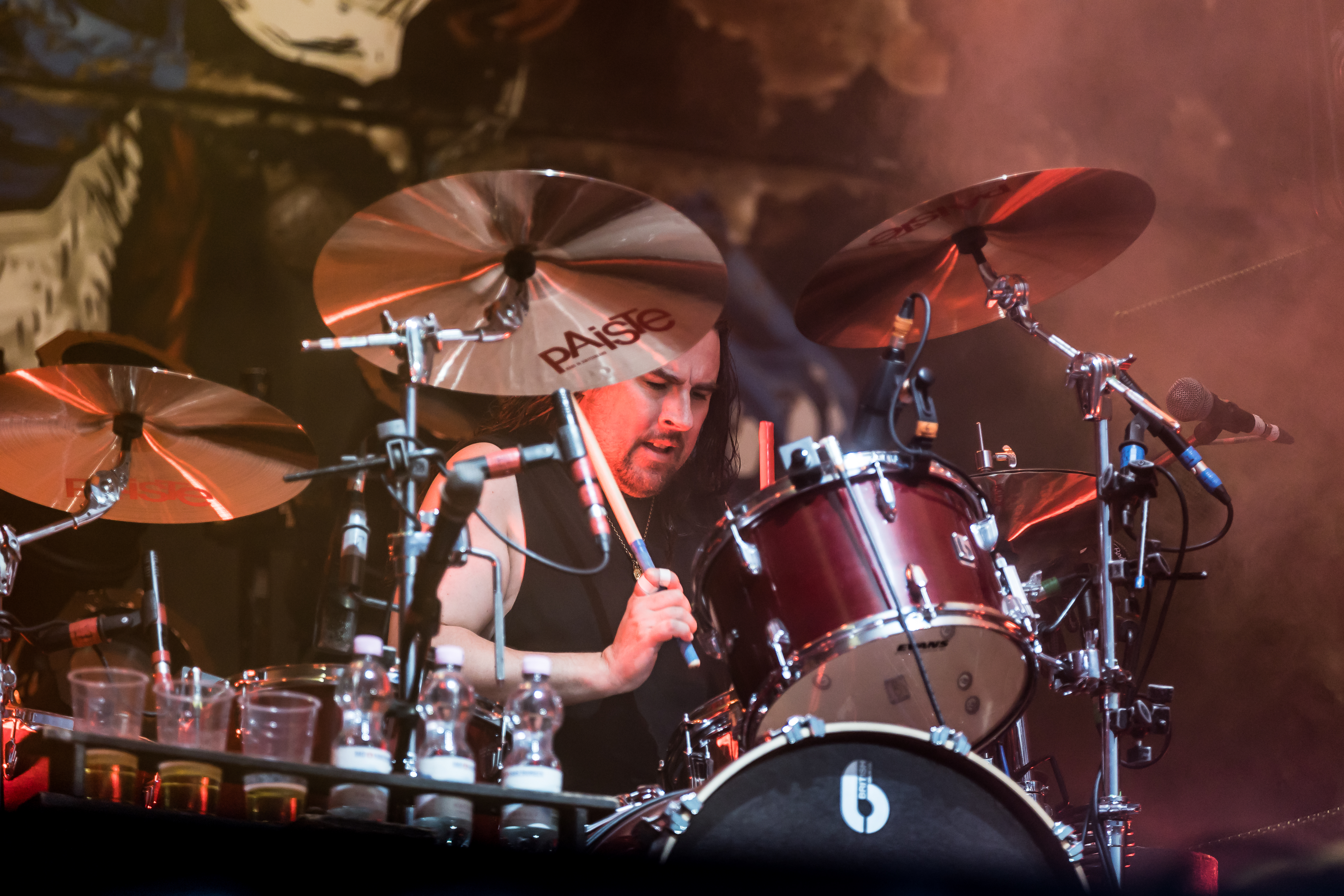
Ryan O’Keeffe, drums

== Discography ==
=== Studio albums ===
Year	Album details	Peak chart positions										Certifications (sales thresholds)
Year	Album details	AUS	AUT	CAN	FRA	GER	NZ	SWE	SWI	UK	US	Certifications (sales thresholds)
2007	Runnin' Wild: Released: 23 June 2007; Label: Capitol/EMI (5014352); Format: CD, digital download, streaming, LP	21	59	—	95	27	39	—	49	62	106	BPI: Silver
2010	No Guts. No Glory.: Released: 8 March 2010; Label: EMI, Roadrunner; Format: CD, digital download, streaming, LP	19	13	11	31	4	9	11	9	31	90	
2013	Black Dog Barking: Released: 21 May 2013; Label: Roadrunner; Format: CD, digital download, streaming, LP	17	11	21	31	5	19	13	9	22	89	
2016	Breakin' Outta Hell: Released: 23 September 2016; Label: Universal/Spinefarm (SPINE799189, SPINE799192); Format: CD, digital download, streaming, LP	13	3	54	13	3	33	36	4	9	—	
2019	Boneshaker: Released: 25 October 2019; Label: Spinefarm; Format: CD, digital download, streaming, LP	14	16	—	37	7	—	21	7	39	—	
2026	Airbourne: Released: 4 September 2026; Label: Spinefarm; Format: CD, digital download, streaming, LP	19	3	—	30	2	—	10	2	56	—	
"—" denotes album that did not chart or was not released in that country.

=== Live albums ===
- Live at the Playroom EP (September 2007) – EMI.

=== Compilation albums ===
Year	Album details
2017	Diamond Cuts: The B-Sides: Released: 29 September 2017; Label: Nettwerk (0 6700 31135 26); Format: CD, digital download, streaming, LP
2021	Back in the Game: The Un-Limited Release: Released: 8 January 2021; Label: Nettwerk (MWT14042865); Format: digital download, streaming

=== Extended plays ===
Ready to Rock (2004) – Sik Kitty/Field Man Australia

=== Singles ===
Year	Song	Chart positions			Album
Year	Song	CAN	CAN Rock	US Main. Rock	Album
2007	"Runnin' Wild"	90	1	22	Runnin' Wild
2007	"Too Much, Too Young, Too Fast"	74	3	16	Runnin' Wild
2007	"Diamond in the Rough"	—	13	—	Runnin' Wild
2010	"No Way But the Hard Way"	—	2	29	No Guts. No Glory.
2010	"Blonde, Bad and Beautiful"	—	9	—	No Guts. No Glory.
2010	"Born to Kill"	—	—	—	No Guts. No Glory.
2013	"Live It Up"	—	1	40	Black Dog Barking
2013	"No One Fits Me (Better Than You)"	—	1	—	Black Dog Barking
2016	"Breakin' Outta Hell"	—	1	42	Breakin' Outta Hell
2019	"Boneshaker"	—	—	—	Boneshaker
2025	"Gutsy"	—	—	—	Airbourne
2025	"Christmas Bonus"	—	—	—	Airbourne
2026	"Alive After Death (Last Plane Out)"	—	—	—	Airbourne
2026	"Kid In A Candy Store"	—	—	—	Airbourne
2026	"Here She Comes"	—	—	—	Airbourne

=== Additional tracks ===
- 2002: "Rock 'n' Roll" and "Give It All You Got" (Hard Wired) (by Airborne)
- 2008: "Turn Up the Trouble" (World Wrestling Entertainment – Theme Music Volume 8) – Sony (SBM 88697273392)

== In popular culture ==
Airbourne songs used in popular culture
Song	Album	Use(s)	Year	Ref.
"Blackjack"	Runnin' Wild	Need for Speed: ProStreet; NFL Tour	2007	
"Girls in Black"	Runnin' Wild	Tony Hawk's Proving Ground; Need for Speed: Undercover	2007	
"Let's Ride"	Runnin' Wild	Skate; College; Trials Rising	2007	
"Runnin' Wild"	Runnin' Wild	NASCAR 08; Rock Band, Rock Band 2; Battlefield: Bad Company; Madden NFL 08; NHL 09; NASCAR 09; The Crew 2; Cobra Kai season 5, "Head of the Snake"; SAS: Rogue Heroes season 2, episode 3	2007	
"Stand Up for Rock 'N' Roll"	Runnin' Wild	NASCAR 08; NHL 08; Madden NFL 09; Royal Rumble (2008)	2007	
"Too Much, Too Young, Too Fast"	Runnin' Wild	Guitar Hero World Tour; Burnout Paradise; Lost Boys: The Tribe; NASCAR 09; I Love You Beth Cooper	2008	
"Turn Up the Trouble"	WWE The Music, Volume 8	WWE SmackDown vs. Raw 2009; WWE SmackDown vs. Raw 2010	2008	
"Heads are Gonna Roll"	No Guts. No Glory.	Madden NFL 10	2009	
"Bottom of the Well"	No Guts. No Glory.	NHL 11	2010	
"Diamond in the Rough"	Runnin' Wild	She's Out of My League	2010	
"Raise the Flag"	No Guts. No Glory.	Twisted Metal	2012	
"Live It Up"	Black Dog Barking	Full Throttle; Extreme Rules 2013; NHL 14	2013	
"Firepower"	Black Dog Barking	Plants vs. Zombies: Garden Warfare	2014	
"Back in the Game"	Black Dog Barking	Guitar Hero Live; Cobra Kai season 2, "Fire and Ice"	2015	
"Breaking Outta Hell"	Breakin' Outta Hell	WWE Hell in a Cell; Cobra Kai season 4, "First Learn Stand"	2016	
"It's All for Rock N' Roll"	Breakin' Outta Hell	Mario + Rabbids Kingdom Battle	2017	
"Hungry"	Black Dog Barking	Trials Rising	2019	

== Awards and nominations ==
=== ARIA Music Awards ===
The ARIA Music Awards are an annual awards ceremony that recognises excellence, innovation, and achievement across all genres of Australian music. The first ceremony occurred in 1987. Airbourne have received five nominations.

Year	Nominee / work	Award	Result	Ref.
2007	Runnin' Wild	Best Rock Album	Nominated	
2007	Runnin' Wild	Breakthrough Artist – Album	Nominated	
2010	No Guts, No Glory.	Best Hard Rock or Heavy Metal Album	Nominated	
2013	Black Dog Barking	Best Hard Rock or Heavy Metal Album	Nominated	
2017	Breakin' Outta Hell	Best Hard Rock or Heavy Metal Album	Nominated	

=== Other awards ===
- SleazeRoxx.com:
  - Winner: Best Album (2007) for Runnin' Wild
  - Voted 12th Best Album (2007) in Sleaze Roxx Reader's Poll for Runnin' Wild
- UltimateRockGods.com:
  - Nominated: Best Rock Vocal Performance (2007) for Runnin' Wild
  - Nominated: Best Rock Song (2007) for "Runnin' Wild"
  - Nominated: Best New Artist (2007)
- Metal Hammer Golden Gods Awards:
  - Winner: Best Debut Album (2008) for Runnin' Wild
- Classic Rock Roll of Honour Awards :
  - Winner: Best New Band (2008)
