= Larry Doyle (writer) =

American novelist, screenwriter, and producer

- Occupations: Novelist, columnist, humorist, screenwriter
- Children: Ben Doyle
- Writing career
- Period: 1989–present
- Genres: Humor, fiction
- Notable works: I Love You, Beth Cooper; The Simpsons; Looney Tunes: Back in Action

Larry Doyle is an American novelist, screenwriter, and producer.

== Career ==
Doyle got his start in 1989–1991 as an editor at Chicago-based First Comics. He started writing for television, with a 1993 and a 1994 episode of Rugrats, then regularly worked on Beavis and Butt-Head between 1994 and 1997, when he joined The Simpsons as a writer and producer for seasons nine through twelve (1997–2001). Other television writing credits include one episode for Daria and two episodes for Liquid Television.

Doyle wrote the screenplays for the 2003 film releases Duplex and Looney Tunes: Back in Action. He also produced some Looney Tunes shorts that were completed in 2003. However, due to the box-office bomb of Looney Tunes: Back in Action, Warner Bros. decided not to release the shorts theatrically, releasing them direct-to-video instead.

Doyle is a frequent contributor to The New Yorker and has also had columns in Esquire, New York Magazine, and the New York Observer.

Doyle's first novel, I Love You, Beth Cooper, was published in May 2007. The setting is graduation night at Buffalo Grove High School, Doyle's alma mater. This novel won the 2008 Thurber prize for American Humor. Doyle wrote the screenplay for the film based on his novel, which was released in 2009. Also in 2009, the book I Love You, Beth Cooper was re-released as an extended movie tie-in edition. His second novel, Go Mutants!, was published in 2010. This novel had its film rights acquired by Imagine Entertainment/Universal Studios the same year, with the screenplay written by Doyle. Deliriously Happy (and Other Bad Thoughts), a collection of humor pieces from the New Yorker and elsewhere, was published in 2011.

In 2023, Doyle co-created the web series Command Z with Kurt Andersen. Steven Soderbergh funded and directed all eight episodes, distributing them on his platform, with money raised going to Children's Aid. The series was nominated for a 2024 Writers Guild of America Award in the category "Short Form New Media."

== Bibliography ==
=== Novels ===
- I Love You, Beth Cooper (May 2007) ISBN 0-06-123617-9
- Go Mutants! (June 2010) ISBN 0-06-168655-7

=== Collected humor pieces ===
- Deliriously Happy (and Other Bad Thoughts) (November 2011) ISBN 0-06-196683-5

=== Media tie-ins ===
- Beavis and Butt-head: This Sucks Change It (1995)
- Beavis and Butt-head: Huh Huh for Hollywood (1996)
- I Love You, Beth Cooper (Extended Movie Tie-In Edition) (May 2009) ISBN 0-06-174485-9

=== Comics ===
- Pogo, syndicated comic strip illustrated by Neal Sternecky (1989–1991)
- Bad Publicity, comic strip in the back of New York Magazine (1994–1997)

=== Articles ===
==== The New Yorker ====
- "Life Without Leann" (January 15, 1990)
- "t.V." (April 2, 1990)
- "You Won't Have Nixon to Kick Around Anymore, Dirtbag" (December 20, 1993)
- "Adventures in Experimentation" (March 28, 1994)
- "Stop Me If You've Heard This One" (March 29, 1999)
- "Me v. Big Mike" (June 14, 1999)
- "I Killed Them in New Haven" (December 15, 2003)
- "Disengagements" (March 28, 2005)
- "May We Tell You Our Specials This Evening?" (October 3, 2005)
- "Let's Talk About My New Movie" (January 23, 2006)
- "How Fred Flintstone Got Home, Got Wild, and Got a Stone Age Life" (May 15, 2006)
- "I'm Afraid I Have Some Bad News" (June 19, 2006)
- "Please Read Before Suing" (February 2, 2007)
- "We Request the Honor of Your Presence at GwynneandDaveShareTheirJoy.com" (May 21, 2007)
- "My Mega-Millions" (August 27, 2007)
- "Portrait in Evil: My Story" (September 17, 2007)
- "Why We Strike" (November 19, 2007)
- "Bad Dog" (May 12, 2008)
- "Is There a Problem Here?" (December 15, 2008)
- "Fun Times!" (April 20, 2009)
- "Hot Wings: Notes on My New Best Seller" (June 7, 2010)
- "Sleeper Camp" (August 9, 2010)
- "Fun Summer" Online only (May 31, 2012)
- "Reboot Me" (July 23, 2012)
- "Kill your darlings". Shouts & Murmurs. The New Yorker. 97 (1): 29. February 15–22, 2021.

==== Esquire ====
- "The Talk: What Does a Father Owe a Son" (May 1988)
- "Esky" columnist (1997–1999)
- "My Heart, My Rules" (February 1998)
- "Naughty, Awful Boys" (June 1998)
- "The Weiner" (June 1999)
- "Freezer Madness" (October 1999)
- "The Babyproofer" (January 2000)
- "Me's a Crowd" (September 2000)
- "Things You Need to Know About Me" (October 2006)

=== Other contributions ===
Doyle has also contributed widely to several magazines as a regular columnist or editor, including:

- United Press International, Medical and Science Reporter (1983–1989)
- First Comics, Editor in Chief (1989)
- National Lampoon, Editor (1991)
- Spy Magazine, Deputy Editor (1992–1993)
- Eight Days a Week column for the New York Observer, (1993–1994)
- Front Page column for New York Magazine, and the Deputy Editor (1994–1997)

== Film, television, and radio writing credits ==
=== Film ===
- Duplex (2003)
- Looney Tunes: Back in Action (2003)
- I Love You, Beth Cooper (2009)
- Go Mutants! (forthcoming, announced)

=== Television ===
==== Instant Mom episodes ====
- "Rock Mom"
- "Ain't Misbehavin' or Else"
- "Walk Like a Boy"

==== The Simpsons episodes ====
- "Girly Edition" (1998)
- "Treehouse of Horror IX" ("The Terror of Tiny Toon") (1998)
- "Wild Barts Can't Be Broken" (1999)
- "Simpsons Bible Stories" (with Tim Long and Matt Selman as co-writers) (1999)
- "Pygmoelian" (2000)
- "It's A Mad, Mad, Mad, Mad Marge" (2000)
- "Worst Episode Ever" (2001)

==== Beavis and Butt-Head episodes ====
- "Choke"
- "Nosebleed"
- "Bad Dog"
- "Butt Flambé"
- "Stewart is Missing"
- "A Very Special Episode"
- "Final Judgement of Beavis"
- "Liar! Liar!"
- "Safe Driving"
- "Beavis and Butt-Head Do America" (Consultant)

===== Rugrats episodes =====
- "Circus Angelicus"
- "Naked Tommy"

==== Daria episodes ====
- "Too Cute"

=== Radio ===
- "Life Without Leann" on This American Life
