= Black Dog Barking =

Studio album by Airbourne
- Released: 21 May 2013
- Studio: Van Howes Studio, Los Angeles, CA and The Armoury, Vancouver, BC
- Genre: Hard rock, heavy metal
- Length: 34:54
- Label: Roadrunner
- Producer: Brian Howes

Airbourne chronology
No Guts. No Glory. (2010)	Black Dog Barking (2013)	Breakin' Outta Hell (2016)

Singles from Black Dog Barking
- 1. "Live It Up" Released: 25 March 2013; 2. "No One Fits Me (Better Than You)" Released: 10 May 2013; 3. "Back in the Game" Released: 16 October 2013

Professional ratings
Aggregate scores
Source	Rating
Metacritic	76/100
Review scores
Source	Rating
AllMusic	3.5/5 stars
The Guardian	4/5 stars
Revolver	4/5 stars
Rock Hard	8.5/10

Black Dog Barking is the third studio album by Australian hard rock band Airbourne and the follow-up to their 2010 album No Guts. No Glory. The album was released in Europe and Australia on 20 May 2013, and worldwide on 21 May 2013.

== Background ==
It was announced in November 2011 through their official Facebook page that since mid-2011 the band had been working on a new album. The album's name, Black Dog Barking, was announced in early February 2013. Following this, the band released the following statement:

A lot of thought and effort has gone into this record not only by the band, but by the production crew who worked countless hours, seven days a week, even through Christmas and New Year’s Eve to achieve the best possible performances, backed by real undying tones. Now we’re handing it over to you... so crank it up, crack a beer and stick some rock ‘n’ roll in your ear!

— Airbourne, Airbourne UK Fansite

The Album was released on 21 May 2013 via Roadrunner. Black Dog Barking is Airbourne's first full-length album not to feature the band on the cover art. The artwork was once again created by Australian artists The Sharp Brothers, who also did the cover artwork for No Guts. No Glory. According to David Roads, the idea behind the album title was, to use the Black Dog as a metaphor for the band's ability to break the rules, especially not to care for db limits. At the end of 2013 Airbourne toured Europe, supported - amongst others - by the Swedish band Corroded. The song "Back in the Game" was featured in Season 2, Episode 3 "Fire and Ice" of Cobra Kai, while “Live it Up” was featured in the NHL 14 soundtrack. The song "Ready to Rock" is a re-recorded version of an eponymous song from the band's 2004 EP of the same name.

== Track listing ==
No.	Title	Length
1.	"Ready to Rock"	5:24
2.	"Animalize"	3:03
3.	"No One Fits Me (Better Than You)"	3:06
4.	"Back in the Game"	3:25
5.	"Firepower"	2:59
6.	"Live It Up"	4:26
7.	"Woman Like That"	3:14
8.	"Hungry"	2:56
9.	"Cradle to the Grave"	3:22
10.	"Black Dog Barking"	2:59
Total length:		34:54

Deluxe edition
No.	Title	Length
11.	"Jack Attack"	2:52
12.	"You Got the Skills (To Pay the Bills)"	3:33
13.	"Party in the Penthouse"	3:09

Bonus Disc: Live At Wacken 2011
No.	Title	Length
1.	"Raise the Flag"	3:57
2.	"Born to Kill"	4:13
3.	"Diamond in the Rough"	3:30
4.	"Chewin the Fat"	5:20
5.	"Blackjack"	7:13
6.	"Bottom of the Well"	7:54
7.	"Girls in Black"	4:02
8.	"No Way But the Hard Way"	5:59

== Personnel ==
- Joel O'Keeffe - lead vocals, lead guitar
- David Roads - rhythm guitar, backing vocals
- Justin Street - bass, backing vocals
- Ryan O'Keeffe - drums

== Charts ==
Chart (2013)	Peak position
Australian Albums (ARIA)	17
Austrian Albums (Ö3 Austria)	11
Belgian Albums (Ultratop Flanders)	87
Belgian Albums (Ultratop Wallonia)	43
Dutch Albums (Album Top 100)	90
Finnish Albums (Suomen virallinen lista)	12
French Albums (SNEP)	31
German Albums (Offizielle Top 100)	5
Irish Albums (IRMA)	54
Norwegian Albums (VG-lista)	38
New Zealand Albums (RMNZ)	19
Scottish Albums (OCC)	15
Spanish Albums (Promusicae)	82
Swedish Albums (Sverigetopplistan)	13
Swiss Albums (Schweizer Hitparade)	9
UK Albums (OCC)	9
UK Rock & Metal Albums (OCC)	2
US Billboard 200	89
