= Too Much, Too Young, Too Fast =

2007 single by Airbourne

Single by Airbourne

from the album Runnin' Wild
- Released: 27 June 2007
- Genre: Hard rock
- Length: 3:42
- Label: Roadrunner US; EMI Australia
- Songwriters: Joel O'Keeffe, Victor James Wright
- Producer: Bob Marlette

Airbourne singles chronology
"Runnin' Wild" (2007)	"Too Much, Too Young, Too Fast" (2007)	"Diamond in the Rough" (2007)

"Too Much, Too Young, Too Fast" is the second single from Runnin' Wild by the Australian hard rock band Airbourne.

== Personnel ==
- Joel O'Keeffe – lead vocals, lead guitar
- David Roads – rhythm guitar, backing vocals
- Justin Street – bass, backing vocals
- Ryan O'Keeffe – drums

== Interpretation ==
The lyrics focus on the singer's dissatisfaction with the state of modern society. The song likens bankers to "street gangs and mad men" and their business manoeuvres to "private wars", and continues by criticising "the eye in the sky" (personal surveillance), specifically facial recognition, and the paranoia that this then causes. In the chorus, the singer affirms that "if it's the end of days, I'm going out in style", reflecting his desire to seize the day.

== In popular culture ==
- The song is featured in Burnout Paradise and is the official theme of NASCAR 09.
- It is the intro theme to the movie Lost Boys: The Tribe.
- It was featured in the trailer for I Love You Beth Cooper.
- It was featured in Guitar Hero: World Tour.

== Charts ==
Chart (2007)	Peak position
Canadian Hot 100	74
U.S. Billboard Mainstream Rock Tracks	16
