= Airbourne (album) =

Studio album by Airbourne
- Released: 28 August 2026
- Studios: Music Farm Studio (Byron Bay, New South Wales)
- Genre: Hard rock
- Length: 47:13
- Label: Spinefarm
- Producer: Brian Howes

Airbourne chronology
Boneshaker (2019)	Airbourne (2026)

Singles from Airbourne
- 1. "GUTSY" Released: 6 June, 2025; 2. "Christmas Bonus" Released: 20 November, 2025; 3. "Alive After Death (Last Plane Out)" Released: 22 April, 2026; 4. "Kid In A Candy Store" Released: 1 July, 2026; 5. "Here She Comes" Released: 29 July, 2026

Airbourne is the sixth studio album by Australian hard rock band Airbourne. It was released on 28 August 2026 via Spinefarm.

It is the band's first album to feature rhythm guitarist Brett Tyrrell, who joined the band in September 2023.

== Track listing ==
No.	Title	Writer(s)	Length
1.	"Gutsy (Note: Stylized in all caps.)"	Joel O'Keeffe; Ryan O'Keeffe	4:41
2.	"Alive After Death (Last Plane Out)"	O'Keeffe; O'Keeffe; Brian Howes	3:30
3.	"Here She Comes"	O'Keeffe; O'Keeffe; Howes	4:10
4.	"Kid in a Candy Store"	O'Keeffe; O'Keeffe; Howes; Vick Wright	4:08
5.	"Sky High"	O'Keeffe; O'Keeffe; Howes	3:33
6.	"Who Put the Rhythm in You?"	O'Keeffe; O'Keeffe; Howes	4:32
7.	"Christmas Bonus"	O'Keeffe; O'Keeffe; Wright	3:31
8.	"Last Man Standing"	O'Keeffe; O'Keeffe; Wright	3:18
9.	"Rock 'n' Roll Ya"	O'Keeffe; O'Keeffe; Howes; Wright	3:29
10.	"Bogota"	O'Keeffe; O'Keeffe; Howes	4:11
11.	"Hells Got No Vacancy"	O'Keeffe; O'Keeffe; Howes; Wright	3:34
12.	"Send Me to Rock 'n' Roll Heaven"	O'Keeffe; O'Keeffe; Howes	4:30
Total length:			47:13

== Personnel ==
Airbourne

- Joel O'Keeffe – lead vocals, lead guitar
- Ryan O'Keeffe – drums, backing vocals
- Justin Street – bass guitar, backing vocals
- Brett Tyrrell – rhythm guitar, backing vocals

Additional personnel

- Bryan Adams - backing vocals on "Here She Comes" and "Who Put The Rhythm In You?"
- Nick Howe - backing vocals on "GUTSY"
- Brian Howes - backing vocals
- Mutt Lange - backing vocals on "Here She Comes" and "Who Put The Rhythm In You?"

== Charts ==
=== Weekly charts ===
Weekly chart performance for Airbourne
Chart (2026)	Peak position
French Albums (SNEP)	30
Spanish Albums (Promusicae)	74
