= Boneshaker (Airbourne album) =

Studio album by Airbourne
- Released: 25 October 2019
- Studios: RCA Studio A (Nashville, Tennessee)
- Genre: Hard rock
- Length: 30:36
- Label: Spinefarm
- Producer: Dave Cobb

Airbourne chronology
Breakin' Outta Hell (2016)	Boneshaker (2019)	Airbourne (2026)

Boneshaker is the fifth studio album by Australian hard rock band Airbourne. It was released on 25 October 2019 via Spinefarm and was produced by American record producer, songwriter and music executive Dave Cobb.

It is the first and only Airbourne album to feature Matt "Harri" Harrison on rhythm guitar, taking the place of the band's rhythm guitarist and longtime original member David Roads, who left in 2017.

== Track listing ==
No.	Title	Length
1.	"Boneshaker"	3:30
2.	"Burnout the Nitro"	3:31
3.	"This Is Our City"	3:05
4.	"Sex to Go"	2:34
5.	"Backseat Boogie"	3:23
6.	"Blood in the Water"	2:23
7.	"She Gives Me Hell"	2:47
8.	"Switchblade Angel"	2:06
9.	"Weapon of War"	4:37
10.	"Rock 'n' Roll for Life"	2:40
Total length:		30:36

== Personnel ==
- Joel O'Keeffe – lead vocals, lead guitar
- Justin Street – bass guitar, backing vocals
- Matt "Harri" Harrisson – rhythm guitar, backing vocals
- Ryan O'Keeffe – drums

== Charts ==
Chart (2019)	Peak position
Australian Albums (ARIA)	14
Austrian Albums (Ö3 Austria)	16
Belgian Albums (Ultratop Flanders)	98
Belgian Albums (Ultratop Wallonia)	47
Czech Albums (ČNS IFPI)	90
Finnish Albums (Suomen virallinen lista)	18
French Albums (SNEP)	37
German Albums (Offizielle Top 100)	7
Scottish Albums (Official Charts)	11
Spanish Albums (Promusicae)	23
Swedish Albums (Sverigetopplistan)	21
Swiss Albums (Schweizer Hitparade)	7
UK Albums (Official Charts)	39
UK Rock & Metal Albums (Official Charts)	2
