= No Guts. No Glory. =

Studio album by Airbourne
- Released: 8 March 2010
- Studio: Groovemaster Recordings, Chicago; Hothouse Recordings, St. Kilda, Melbourne (bonus tracks)
- Genre: Hard rock, heavy metal
- Length: 46:53; 60:33 (special edition)
- Label: EMI (Australia); Roadrunner (rest of the world)
- Producer: Johnny K

Airbourne chronology
Runnin' Wild (2007)	No Guts. No Glory. (2010)	Black Dog Barking (2013)

Singles from No Guts. No Glory.
- 1. "No Way But the Hard Way" Released: 8 February 2010; 2. "Blonde, Bad and Beautiful" Released: 18 June 2010; 3. "Bottom of the Well" Released: 13 October 2010

Professional ratings
Aggregate scores
Source	Rating
Metacritic	64/100
Review scores
Source	Rating
AllMusic	2.5/5 stars
BBC Music	8/10
Classic Rock	8/10
The Guardian	3/5 stars
PopMatters	6/10
Q	4/5 stars
Rock Sound	7/10
Spin	4/10
Sputnikmusic	1.5/5 stars

No Guts. No Glory. is the second studio album by Australian hard rock band Airbourne and the follow-up to their 2007 debut Runnin' Wild. The album was released on 8 March 2010, in Europe, Canada, Japan and Australia and on 20 April 2010 in the US.

The first single from the record was "No Way But the Hard Way" and was made available on iTunes on 9 February 2010.

== Track listing ==
All tracks are written by Joel and Ryan O'Keeffe.

No.	Title	Length
1.	"Born to Kill"	3:39
2.	"No Way But the Hard Way"	3:34
3.	"Blonde, Bad and Beautiful"	3:49
4.	"Raise the Flag"	3:32
5.	"Bottom of the Well"	4:29
6.	"White Line Fever"	3:10
7.	"It Ain't Over Till It's Over"	3:17
8.	"Steel Town"	3:08
9.	"Chewin' the Fat"	3:11
10.	"Get Busy Livin'"	3:36
11.	"Armed and Dangerous"	4:12
12.	"Overdrive"	3:22
13.	"Back on the Bottle"	3:50

=== Special Edition bonus tracks ===
No.	Title	Length
14.	"Loaded Gun"	2:51
15.	"My Dynamite Will Blow You Sky High (And Get Ya Moanin' After Midnight)"	3:24
16.	"Rattle Your Bones"	2:36
17.	"Kickin' It Old School"	2:37
18.	"Devil's Child"	2:12

- The Japanese pressing replaces "Devil's Child" and "Kickin' It Old School" with "Heads Are Gonna Roll" – 3:48 as a bonus track.

== Personnel ==
Airbourne

- Joel O'Keeffe – lead vocals, lead guitar
- David Roads – rhythm guitar, backing vocals
- Justin Street – bass, backing vocals
- Ryan O'Keeffe – drums

Production

- Johnny K – producer, engineer
- Daniel Salcido, Matt Dougherty – engineers
- Mike Cashin – assistant engineer
- Mike Fraser – mixing at The Warehouse Studio, Vancouver
- Ted Jensen – mastering at Sterling Sound, New York City

== Charts ==
Chart (2010)	Peak position
Australian Albums (ARIA)	21
Austrian Albums (Ö3 Austria)	19
Belgian Albums (Ultratop Wallonia)	93
Dutch Albums (Album Top 100)	81
Finnish Albums (Suomen virallinen lista)	17
French Albums (SNEP)	31
German Albums (Offizielle Top 100)	4
Irish Albums (IRMA)	64
Italian Albums (FIMI)	93
New Zealand Albums (RMNZ)	9
Scottish Albums (OCC)	23
Spanish Albums (PROMUSICAE)	67
Swedish Albums (Sverigetopplistan)	11
Swiss Albums (Schweizer Hitparade)	9
UK Albums (OCC)	31
UK Rock & Metal Albums (OCC)	1
US Billboard 200	90
US Top Hard Rock Albums (Billboard)	10
US Top Rock Albums (Billboard)	28
