= I Love You, Beth Cooper =

2007 novel by Larry Doyle

- First edition cover
- Author: Larry Doyle
- Cover artist: Evan Dorkin
- Language: English
- Genre: Comedy novel
- Publisher: Ecco (HarperCollins)
- Publication date: 2007
- Publication place: United States
- Media type: Print (hardcover)
- Pages: 255 pp
- ISBN: 978-0-06-123617-4
- OCLC: 76143550
- Dewey Decimal: 813/.6 22
- LC Class: PS3604.O9549 I3 2007

I Love You, Beth Cooper is a comedy novel written by former Simpsons writer Larry Doyle. I Love You, Beth Cooper follows a high school graduate who confesses his love for a cheerleader during his valedictorian speech. The novel was made into a 2009 film, starring Hayden Panettiere and Paul Rust.

== Plot summary ==
Upon graduation from Buffalo Grove High School, valedictorian Denis Cooverman states to the entire gymnasium that he's had a crush on cheerleader Beth Cooper for six years. During the speech, he singles out several members of the class including the class bully and a pretty but shallow party girl, and tells his movie-quoting best friend Rich to admit that he's gay. Denis' speech upsets everyone except Beth, who thinks it was "sweet", giving Denis the courage to invite her to a party at his house that night. After the speech, it is revealed that Beth in fact has a boyfriend, an off duty army soldier named Kevin who threatens Denis.

After his declaration, Denis' mother and father leave him and Rich alone at the house for their party, which no one attends, as they are social outcasts. Beth shows up in her tiny blue car with her friends Cammy and Treece (the group of three is known as "The Trinity") at Denis' house that evening. Things are awkward and become worse when Kevin shows up with his army buddies, and Denis and Rich are assaulted and Denis' house (the kitchen) is trashed. Beth and the Trinity help Denis and Rich get away.

Beth is meant to be a dream girl, but has glaring imperfections that shatter Denis' fantasy. Throughout the novel the real Beth shows that she is nowhere near the perfect girl that Denis has imagined.

They then travel out to Old Tobacco Road where Denis and Beth drink and converse about their roles in high school and why exactly Denis fell for Beth; he admits it was because she was pretty and he always sat behind her. Cammy, Treece, and Rich try to tip over a cow but fail miserably. The girls then proceed to tell a scary story to get the boys entranced then floor it. They eventually crash into Denis' parents car where his parents were having sex.

The group then heads to Valli Wooly's (the shallow rich party girl) party. Denis, feeling uninvited does not accompany the Trinity into the party but decides to enter in anyway later. After some mishaps involving getting hit on by a fat girl, meeting the ugly girl he once made out with, he is again confronted by Kevin. Kevin and his gang then proceed to beat Denis up in front of the entire party in the most humiliating fashion, pounding him to the beat of the song playing. Beth then crashes Kevin's Humvee into the house itself and the group escapes.

The group heads back to the high school where Beth, Cammy, and Treece show off their cheer leading act. After the act, the girls head to the showers and Rich and Denis follow. Rich immediately proceeds to enter in the showers with the girls but as Denis is taking off his pants, he sees Beth get out the shower. Rich and Denis fight off Kevin for a bit by using their wet towels to thrash them with; this they learned to do after a brutal beating Rich had in freshman year. The group escapes in Beth's original car which Kevin used to drive down to the high school from the party. After escaping, Beth reveals to Denis that she only came to his party because it would be "funny", leaving Denis disappointed. Denis gets a nose bleed and Treece gives him tampons to stick up his nostrils to stop the bleeding. Next, Beth tells Denis his shirt smells and forces him to take it off. Beth takes his shirt and holds it out the window to "air it off"; the shirt then flies out the window. They stop the car and Denis, in his underwear, goes to find his shirt, which he finds in a puddle of mud being eaten by a pair of raccoons. Denis gives up his attempt at retrieval and returns to the car in only his "lucky" (meaning holey) underwear. Beth lends him a poncho.

The gang arrives at Treece's father's cabin where they all share a drink. Beth goes out with Denis for a smoke and to watch the moon. They talk about their futures and the fact that Beth is resigned to the fact that her life after this is not going to get much better but that Denis has so many opportunities available to him. Back at the cabin Cammy and Treece imply that Rich is gay. He continues to deny he is. So they decide to test him. Cammy grabs a condom and they have sex, where it's revealed that he isn't gay but the two girls might be as the sex is mostly Cammy and Treece having sex with Rich just being a bystander. They all share what they plan to do once the summer's over realizing they are going to be in the same dorm with similar majors.

Beth and Denis talk about their plans after summer, and they make out. Beth breaks off before they go too far and Kevin and his gang show up again. After beating up Denis a bit more they are confronted by Rich who has a rifle belonging to Treece's father. However, before they can be driven off the rifle falls apart revealing that it was not functioning. Kevin then forces Denis to row a boat out to the middle of the lake. Denis hits Kevin with an oar knocking him out of the boat and unconscious. Denis, fearing for his college admittance, jumps over and rescues Kevin revealing that he is a champion swimmer. He pulls Kevin to shore and prepares to administer CPR. Kevin however, recovers and subdues him yet again. Before anything more happens, the police arrive. Fighting stereotypes of dumb teenagers Rich, Treece and Cammy had called the police. The police bring the whole group in. Kevin's father forgoes charging Beth with stealing his car if they don't charge Kevin with attempting to kill Denis. They are taken home. Beth is dropped off at an empty house. Beth and Denis share a moment where Denis promises to marry Beth if she isn't fat at their 10-year reunion. On the way home, Rich reveals that he thinks he might be gay. When they get home Denis's parents are there and inform him that he will have to be punished. After his mom goes in, Denis tells his dad it was worth it. His father tells him not to mention that to his mother.

In the conclusion, Denis grew seven inches in the summer and gained 40 pounds. Rich tried being gay and didn't much like being homosexual either and is waiting for the next thing. Treece and Cammy decided they were just good friends and they shouldn't drink so much around each other. Beth and Denis see each other a week before he intends to go off to school.

== Film version ==
A film version of I Love You, Beth Cooper, starring Hayden Panettiere as Beth and Paul Rust as Denis, opened in the summer of 2009 to scathing reviews and quickly flopped. The film was largely faithful to the novel, but made a significant change by making Beth more outwardly responsive at the end to Denis' feelings for her.
