= Cow tipping =

Urban legend

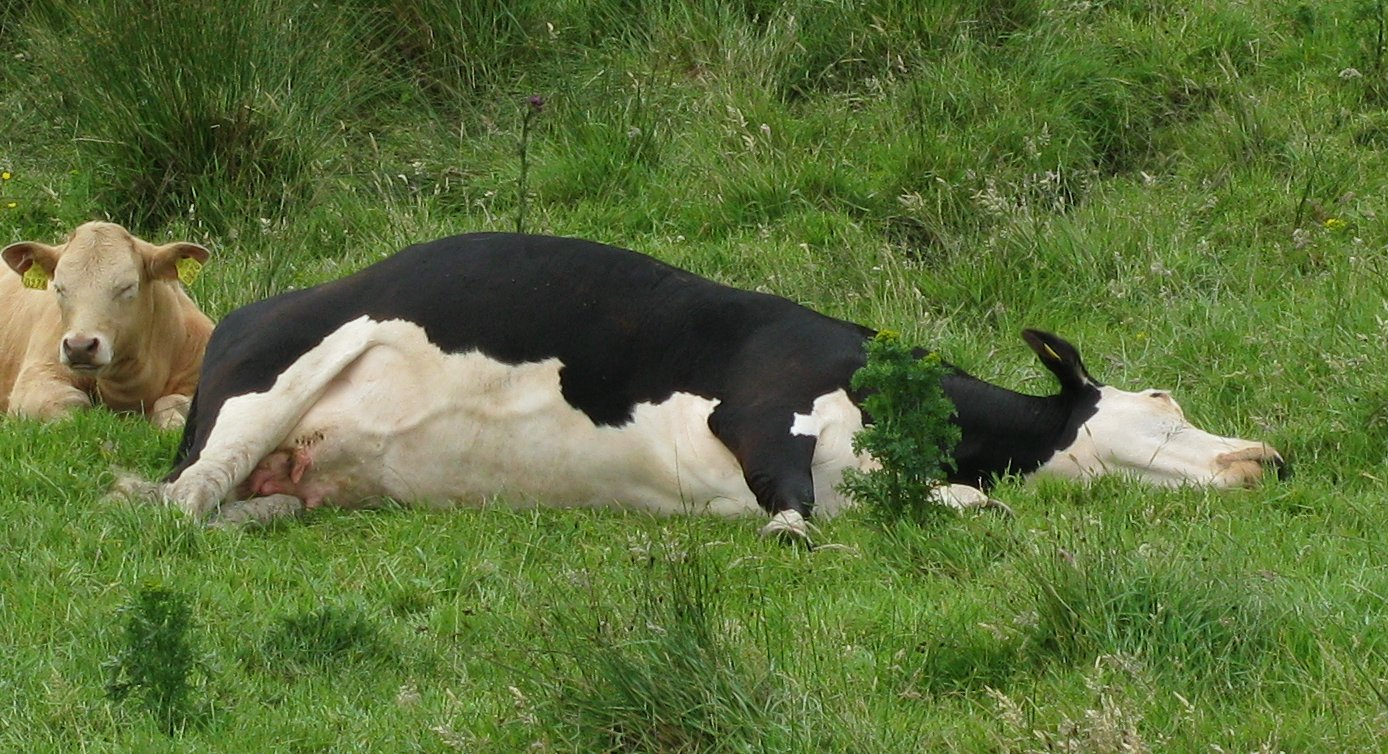
Cows routinely lie down to sleep.

Cow tipping is the purported activity of sneaking up on any unsuspecting or sleeping upright cow and pushing it over for entertainment. The practice of cow tipping is generally considered an urban legend and stories of such feats are viewed as tall tales. The implication that rural citizens seek such entertainment due to lack of alternatives is viewed as a stereotype. The concept of cow tipping apparently developed in the 1970s, though tales of animals that cannot rise if they fall has historical antecedents dating to the Roman Empire.

Cows routinely lie down and can easily regain their footing unless sick or injured. Scientific studies have been conducted to determine if cow tipping is theoretically possible, with varying conclusions. All agree that cows are large animals that are difficult to surprise and will generally resist attempts to be tipped. Estimates suggest a force of between 3,000 and 4,000 newtons (670 and 900 pounds-force) is needed, and that at least four and possibly as many as fourteen people would be required to achieve this. In real-life situations where cattle have to be laid on the ground, or "cast", such as for branding, hoof care or veterinary treatment, either rope restraints are required or specialized mechanical equipment is used that confines the cow and then tips it over. On rare occasions, cattle can lie down or fall down in proximity to a ditch or hill that restricts their normal ability to rise without help. Cow tipping has many references in popular culture and is also used as a figure of speech.

== Scientific study ==
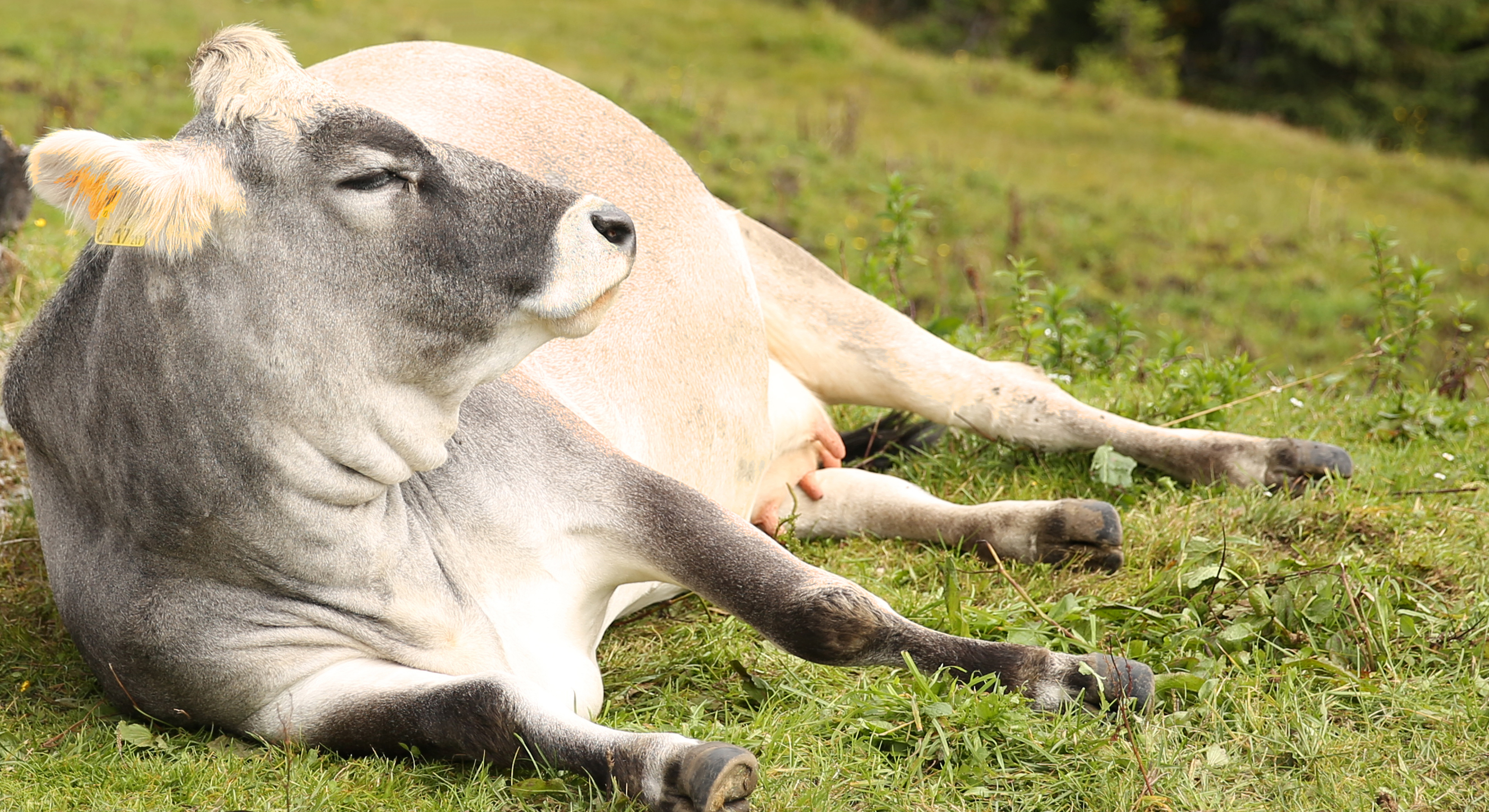
A healthy cow lying on her side is not immobilized; she can rise whenever she chooses.

Some versions of the urban legend suggest that because cows sleep standing up, it is possible to approach them and push them over without the animals reacting. However, cows only sleep lightly while standing up, and they are easily awakened. They lie down to sleep deeply. Furthermore, numerous sources have questioned the practice's feasibility, since most cows weigh over 450 kilograms (990 pounds) and easily resist any lesser force.

A 2005 study led by Margo Lillie, a zoologist at the University of British Columbia, and her student Tracy Boechler, concluded that tipping a cow would require a force of nearly 3,000 newtons (670 lb_{f}) and is therefore impossible to accomplish by a single person. Her calculations found that it would require more than four people to apply enough force to push over a cow, based on an estimate that a single person could exert 660 newtons (150 lb_{f}) of force. However, since a cow can brace itself, Lillie and Boechler suggested that five or six people would, most likely, be needed. Further, cattle are well aware of their surroundings and are very difficult to surprise, due to excellent senses of both smell and hearing. Lillie and Boechler's analysis found that if a cow did not move, the principles of static physics suggest that two people might be able to tip a cow if its centre of mass were pushed over its hooves before the cow could react. However, cows are not rigid or unresponsive, and the faster humans have to move, the less force they can exert. Thus Lillie and Boechler concluded that it is unlikely that cows can actually be tipped over in this way. Lillie stated, "It just makes the physics of it all, in my opinion, impossible."

Although biologist Steven Vogel agrees that it would take a force of about 3,000 newtons to push over a standing cow, he thinks that the study by Lillie and Boechler overestimates the pushing ability of an individual human. Using data from Cotterell and Kamminga, who estimated that humans exert a pushing force of 280 newtons, Vogel suggests that someone applying force at the requisite height to topple a cow might generate a maximum push of no more than 300 newtons. By this calculation, at least 10 people would be needed to tip over a non-reacting cow. However, this combined force requirement, he says, might not be the greatest impediment to such a prank. Standing cows are not asleep and, like other animals, have ever-vigilant reflexes. "If the cow does no more than modestly widen its stance without an overall shift of its center of gravity", he says, "about 4,000 newtons or 14 pushers would be needed—quite a challenge to deploy without angering the cow."

== Historical origins ==
The belief that certain animals cannot rise if pushed over has historical antecedents. Julius Caesar recorded a belief that a European elk had no knee joints and could not get up if it fell. Pliny said the same about the hind legs of an animal he called the achlis, which Pliny's 19th-century translators Bostock and Riley said was merely another name for the elk. They noted that Pliny's belief about the jointless back legs of the achlis (elk) was false.

In 1255, Louis IX of France gave an elephant to Henry III of England for his menagerie in the Tower of London. A drawing by the historian Matthew Paris for his Chronica Majora can be seen in his bestiary at Parker Library of Corpus Christi College, Cambridge. An accompanying text cites elephant lore suggesting that elephants did not have knees and were unable to get up if they fell.

Journalist Jake Steelhammer believes the American urban myth of cow tipping originated in the 1970s. It "stampeded into the '80s", he says, "when movies like Tommy Boy and Heathers featured cow tipping expeditions." Stories about cow tipping tend to be second-hand, he says, told by someone who does not claim to have tipped a cow but who knows someone else who says they did.

== Veterinary and husbandry practices ==
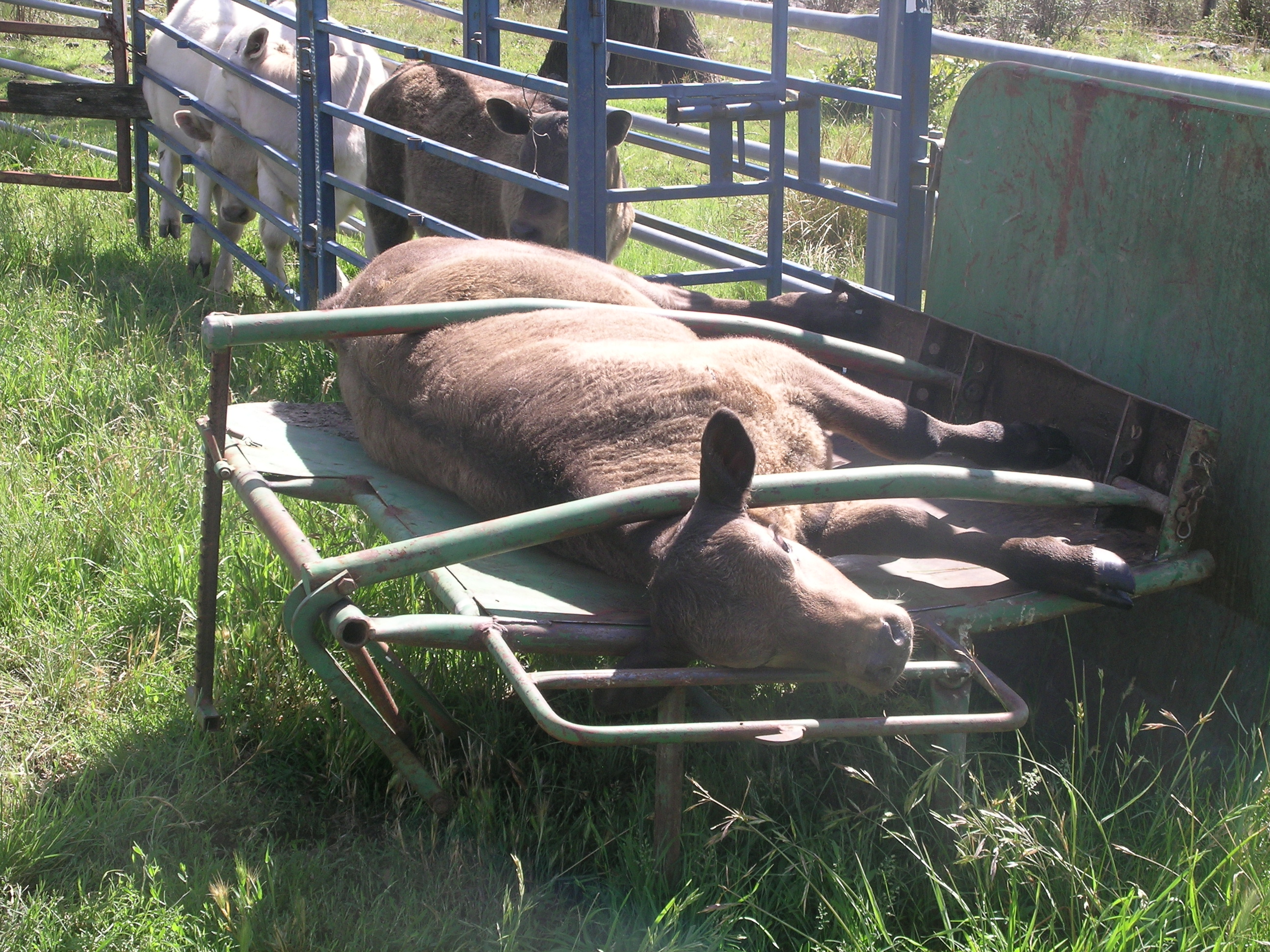
A calf cradle used for branding in Australia

Cattle may need to be deliberately thrown or tipped over for certain types of husbandry practices and medical treatment. When done for medical purposes, this is often called "casting", and when performed without mechanical assistance requires the attachment of 9 to 12 metres (30 to 40 ft) of rope around the body and legs of the animal. After the rope is secured by non-slip bowline knots, it is pulled to the rear until the animal is off-balance. Once the cow is forced to lie down in sternal recumbency (on its chest), it can be rolled onto its side and its legs tied to prevent kicking.

A calf table or calf cradle, also called a "tipping table" or a "throw down", is a relatively modern invention designed to be used on calves that are being branded. A calf is run into a chute, confined, and then tipped by the equipment onto its side for easier branding and castration.

Hydraulic tilt tables for adult cattle have existed since the 1970s and are designed to lift and tip cattle onto their sides to enable veterinary care, particularly of the animals' genitalia, and for hoof maintenance. (Unlike horses, cows generally do not cooperate with a farrier when standing.) A Canadian veterinarian explained, "Using the table is much safer and easier than trying to get underneath to examine the animal", and noted that cows tipped over on a padded table usually stop struggling and become calm fairly quickly. One design, developed at the Western College of Veterinary Medicine in Saskatoon, Saskatchewan, included "cow comfort" as a unique aspect of care using this type of apparatus.

=== Involuntary recumbency ===
Cows may inadvertently tip themselves. Due to their bulk and relatively short legs, cattle cannot roll over. Those that lie down and roll to their sides with their feet pointing uphill may become stuck and unable to rise without assistance, with potentially fatal results. In such cases, two humans can roll or flip a cow onto its other side, so that its feet are aimed downhill, thus allowing it to rise on its own. In one documented case of "real-life cow tipping", a pregnant cow rolled into a gully in New Hampshire and became trapped in an inverted state until rescued by volunteer fire fighters. The owner of the cow commented that he had seen this happen "once or twice" before.

Trauma or illness may also result in a cow unable to rise to its feet. Such animals are sometimes called "downers." Sometimes this occurs as a result of muscle and nerve damage from calving or a disease such as mastitis. Leg injuries, muscle tears, or a massive infection of some sort may also be causes. Downer cows are encouraged to get to their feet and have a much greater chance of recovery if they do. If unable to rise, some have survived—with medical care—as long as 14 days and were ultimately able to get back on their feet. Appropriate medical treatment for a downer cow to prevent further injury includes rolling from one side to the other every three hours, careful and frequent feeding of small amounts of fodder, and access to clean water.

=== Death ===
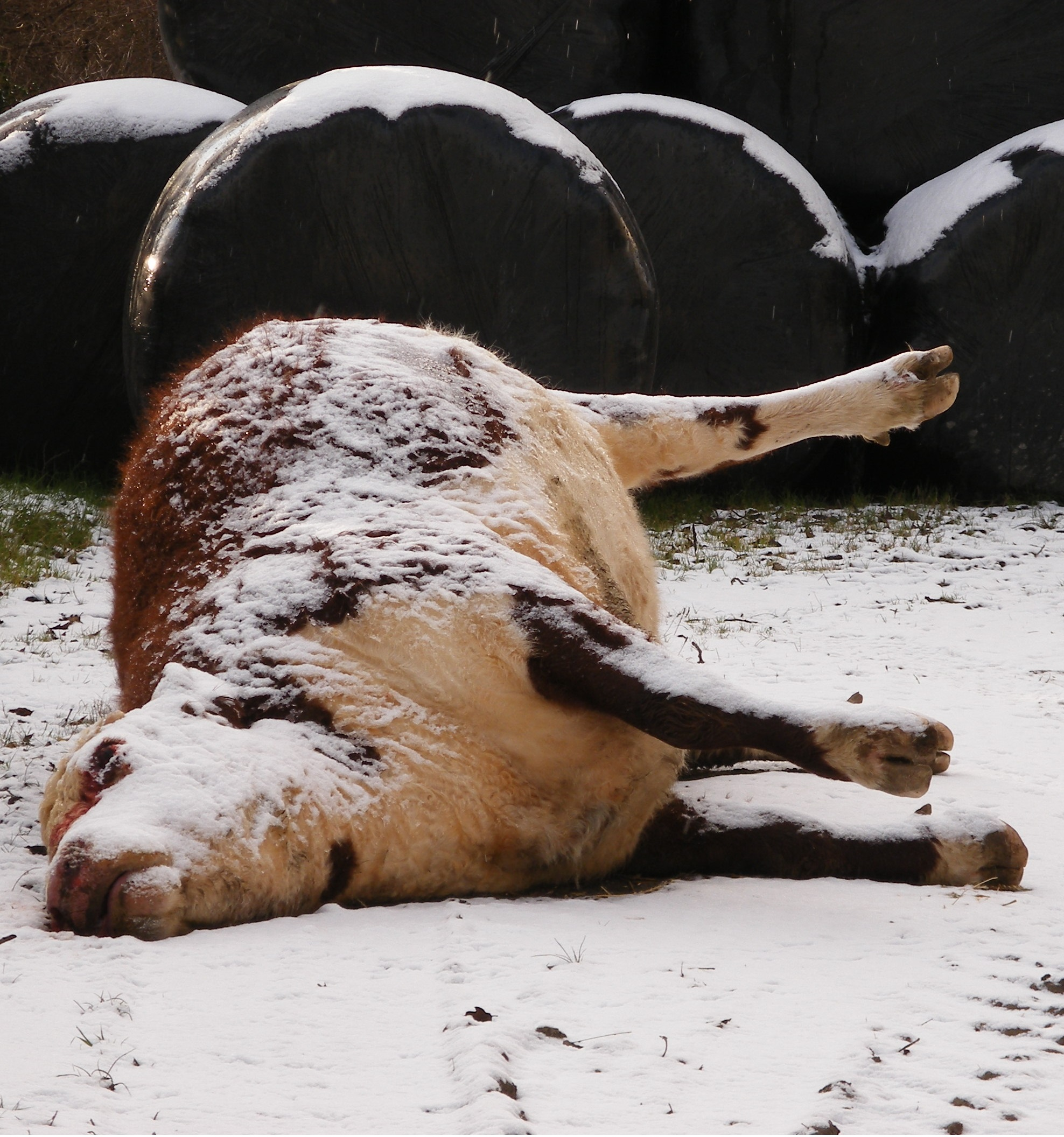
Rigor mortis leads to muscle stiffening, particularly noticeable in the limbs

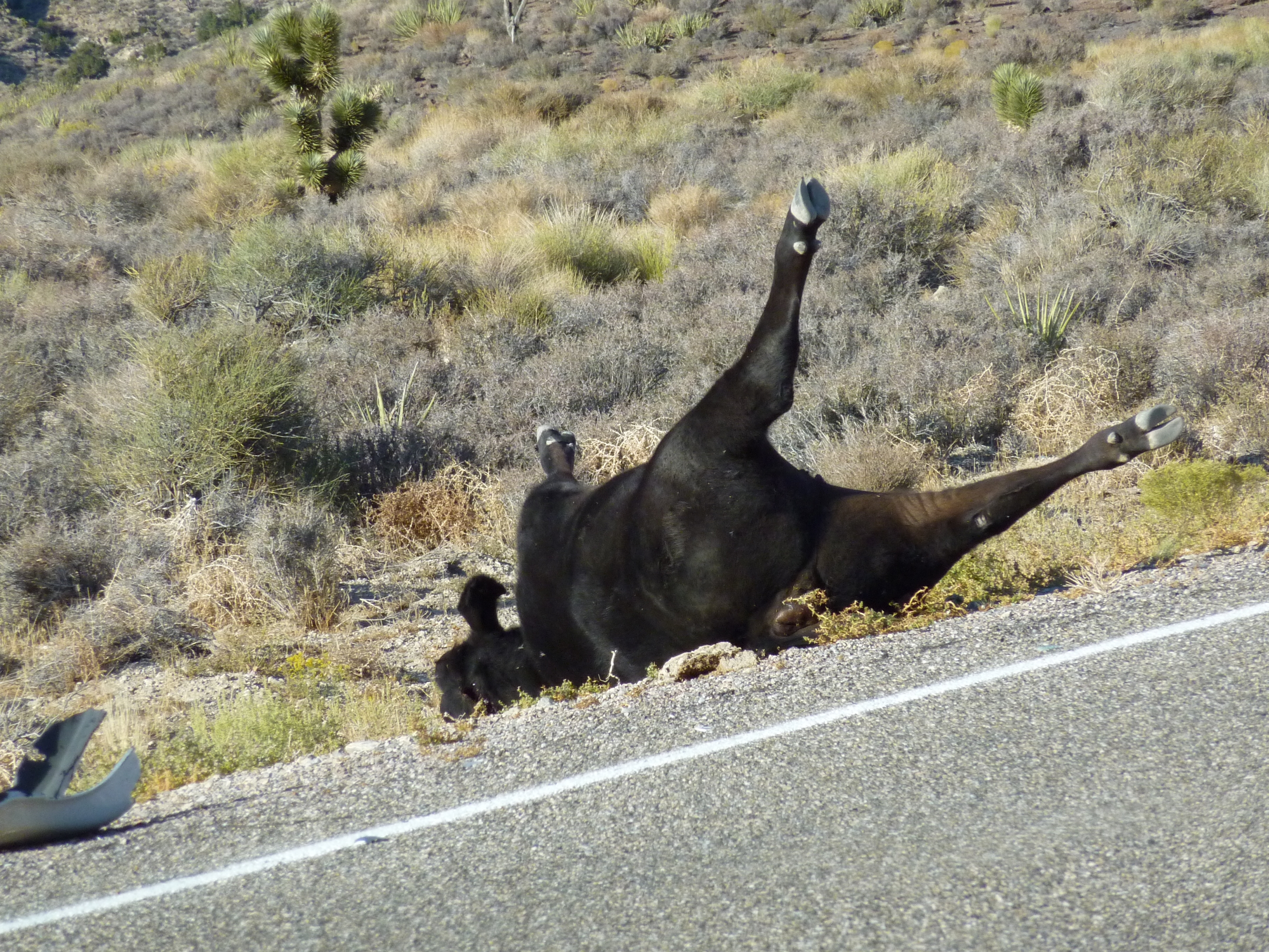
Bloat and rigor mortis combined result in a dead cow appearing "belly up"

Dead animals may appear to have been tipped over, but this is actually the process of rigor mortis, which stiffens the muscles of the carcass, beginning six to eight hours after death and lasting for one to two days. It is particularly noticeable in the limbs, which stick out straight. Post-mortem bloat also occurs because of gas formation inside the body. The process may result in cattle carcasses that wind up on their back with all four feet in the air.

== In popular culture ==
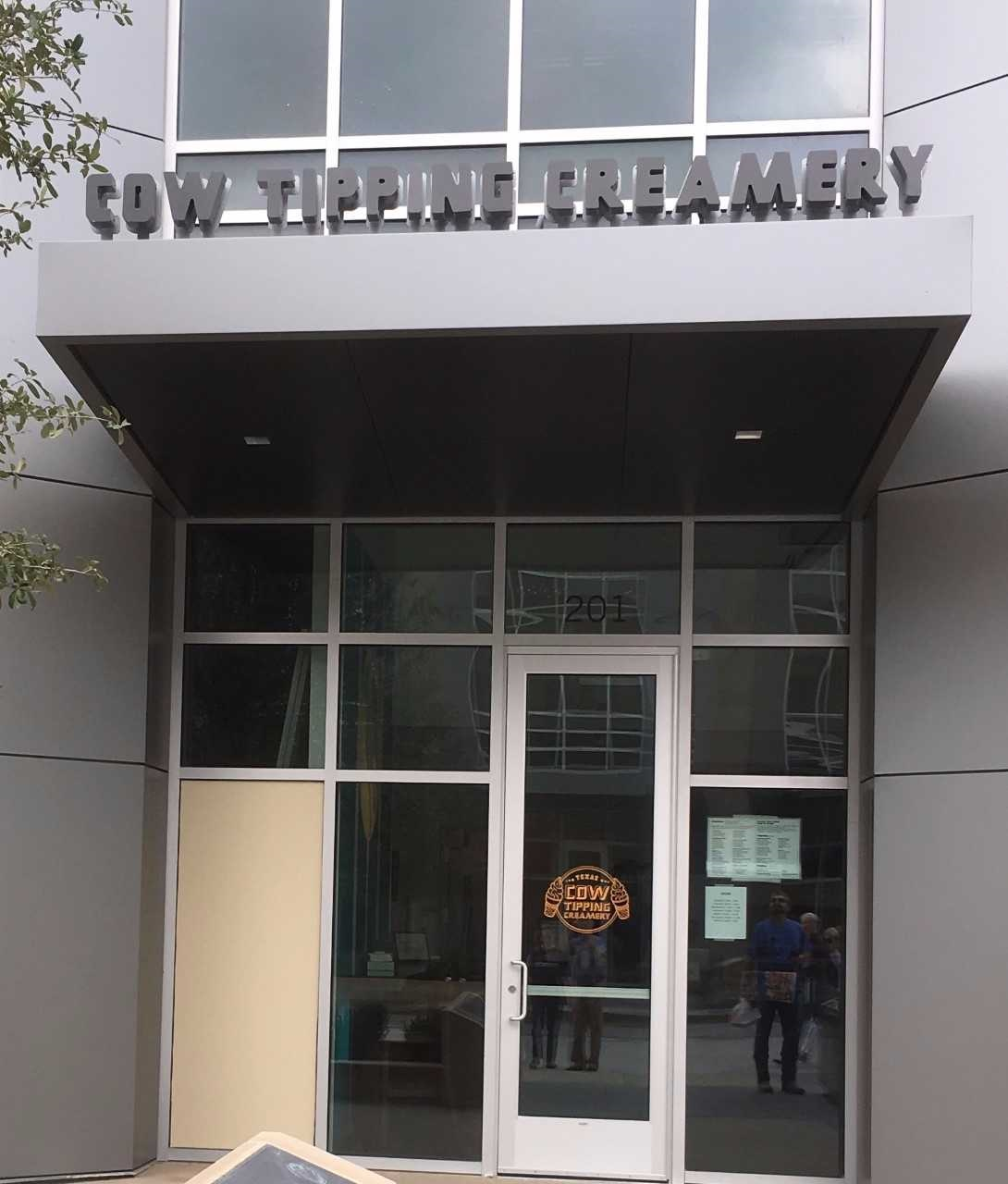
The Cow Tipping Creamery in Frisco, Texas

Assorted individuals have claimed to have performed cow tipping, often while under the influence of alcohol. These claims, to date, cannot be reliably verified, with Jake Swearingen of Modern Farmer noting in 2013 that YouTube, a popular source of videos of challenges and stunts, "fails to deliver one single actual cow-tipping video".

Pranksters have sometimes pushed over artificial cows. Along Chicago's Michigan Avenue in 1999, two "apparently drunk" men felled six fiberglass cows that were part of a Cows on Parade public art exhibit. Four other vandals removed a "Wow cow" sculpture from its lifeguard chair at Oak Street Beach and abandoned it in a pedestrian underpass. A year later, New York City anchored its CowParade art cows, including "A Streetcow Named Desire", to concrete bases "to prevent the udder disrespect of cow-tippers and thieves."

Cow tipping has been featured in films from the 1980s and later, such as Heathers (1988), Tommy Boy (1995), Barnyard (2006), and I Love You, Beth Cooper (2009). It was also used in the title of a 1992 documentary film by Randy Redroad, Cow Tipping—The Militant Indian Waiter.

Variants of cow tipping have also been seen in popular media such as the film Cars (2006), which features a vehicular variant called tractor-tipping, and the video game Fallout: New Vegas, which allows the character to sneak up on and tip over a Brahmin, the game's two-headed cow-like animal. The board game Battle Cattle is based on the practice, with heavily armed cows having "Tipping Defense Numbers."

In the Little Willies song "Lou Reed" from their 2006 self-titled debut album, Norah Jones sings about a fictional event during which musician Lou Reed tips cows in Texas. In another medium, The Big Bang Theory, a television show, uses cow tipping lore as an element to establish the nature of a rural character, Penny.

The term cow tipping is sometimes used as a figure of speech for pushing over something big. In A Giant Cow-Tipping by Savages, author John Weir Close uses the term to describe contemporary mergers and acquisitions. "Tipping sacred cows" has been used as a deliberate mixed metaphor in titles of books on Christian ministry and business management.
