= Breakin' Outta Hell =

Studio album by Airbourne
- Released: 23 September 2016
- Studio: Sing Sing Studios, Melbourne
- Genre: Hard rock, heavy metal
- Length: 39:56
- Label: Spinefarm
- Producer: Bob Marlette

Airbourne chronology
Black Dog Barking (2013)	Breakin' Outta Hell (2016)	Boneshaker (2019)

Breakin' Outta Hell is the fourth studio album by Australian rock band Airbourne. Released on 23 September 2016, the work was published via Spinefarm.

This is the band's last studio album to feature its longtime rhythm guitarist David Roads, who left the band in 2017 to focus on his family business. He is replaced by an ex-Palace of the King guitarist Matt "Harri" Harrison.

== Reception ==
Professional ratings
Aggregate scores
Source	Rating
Metacritic	80/100
Review scores
Source	Rating
The Guardian	4/5 stars
Rock Sound	6/10
Team Rock	4/5 stars

Breakin' Outta Hell received positive reviews from critics. On Metacritic, the album holds a score of 80/100 based on four reviews, indicating "generally favorable reviews".

== Track listing ==
No.	Title	Length
1.	"Breakin' Outta Hell"	3:52
2.	"Rivalry"	4:03
3.	"Get Back Up"	3:38
4.	"It's Never Too Loud for Me"	3:24
5.	"Thin the Blood"	3:29
6.	"I'm Going to Hell for This"	3:45
7.	"Down on You"	4:19
8.	"Never Been Rocked Like This"	3:07
9.	"When I Drink I Go Crazy"	2:41
10.	"Do Me Like You Do Yourself"	3:56
11.	"It's All for Rock n' Roll"	3:39
Total length:		39:56

Deluxe edition
No.	Title	Length
12.	"Bombshell"	3:28
Total length:		43:24

== Charts ==
Chart (2016)	Peak position
Australian Albums (ARIA)	13
Austrian Albums (Ö3 Austria)	3
Belgian Albums (Ultratop Flanders)	29
Belgian Albums (Ultratop Wallonia)	26
Canadian Albums (Billboard)	54
Dutch Albums (Album Top 100)	96
Finnish Albums (Suomen virallinen lista)	24
French Albums (SNEP)	21
German Albums (Offizielle Top 100)	3
Italian Albums (FIMI)	71
New Zealand Albums (RMNZ)	33
Scottish Albums (OCC)	6
Spanish Albums (Promusicae)	50
Swedish Albums (Sverigetopplistan)	36
Swiss Albums (Schweizer Hitparade)	4
UK Albums (OCC)	9
UK Rock & Metal Albums (OCC)	2

== Usage in media ==
The Song "It's All for Rock N' Roll" was used for the E3 trailers of the video game Mario + Rabbids Kingdom Battle. In episode 3 of the fourth Season of the show Cobra Kai, the song "Breakin' Outta Hell" was used during a training montage & when Daniel LaRusso fought with hockey players. "Thunderstruck" by AC/DC was initially supposed to be used, but was replaced due to budget constraints.
