= Runnin' Wild (Airbourne album) =

Studio album by Airbourne
- Released: 23 June 2007
- Studios: Blue Moon (Woodland Hills, California); Henson (Hollywood, California)
- Genres: Hard rock, heavy metal
- Length: 36:40
- Labels: Capitol (Australia); Roadrunner (rest of the world)
- Producer: Bob Marlette

Airbourne chronology
Runnin' Wild (2007)	No Guts. No Glory. (2010)

Singles from Runnin' Wild
- 1. "Runnin' Wild" Released: 16 May 2007; 2. "Too Much, Too Young, Too Fast" Released: 27 June 2007; 3. "Diamond in the Rough" Released: 25 September 2007

Professional ratings
Review scores
Source	Rating
AllMusic	3.5/5 stars
PopMatters	7/10

Runnin' Wild is the debut album by the Australian hard rock band Airbourne. It was released on 23 June 2007 via EMI and debuted on the Australian ARIA album chart at number 21. It debuted at number 62 on the UK album chart. It was released in the United States on 29 January 2008 through Roadrunner Records and debuted at number 106 on the Billboard 200 chart.

Runnin' Wild won "Best Debut" at the Metal Hammer Golden Gods Awards 2008. As of 27 October 2009, the album has sold upwards of 250,000 worldwide.

The album artwork features the front gate of HM Prison Pentridge.

== Track listing ==
All tracks are written by Joel and Ryan O'Keeffe.

No.	Title	Length
1.	"Stand Up for Rock 'n' Roll"	4:01
2.	"Runnin' Wild"	3:38
3.	"Too Much, Too Young, Too Fast"	3:42
4.	"Diamond in the Rough"	2:54
5.	"Fat City"	3:26
6.	"Blackjack"	2:42
7.	"What's Eatin' You"	3:36
8.	"Girls in Black"	3:16
9.	"Cheap Wine & Cheaper Women"	3:10
10.	"Heartbreaker"	3:56
11.	"Hellfire" (US/UK/Japanese editions only, replaced by "Let's Ride" (3:28) on Australian/New Zealand editions)	2:19
12.	"Dirty Angel" (bonus track)	2:32

=== Special Edition bonus tracks ===
No.	Title	Length
12.	"Heads Are Gonna Roll"	3:52
13.	"Dirty Angel"	2:32
14.	"Hotter Than Hell"	4:03
15.	"Red Dress Woman"	3:09
16.	"Stand And Deliver"	4:24
17.	"Let's Ride"	3:28

== Limited edition ==
In addition to the standard bonus tracks above, the limited-edition version, containing a bonus DVD with eight live tracks from the band's appearance at the 2008 Wacken Open Air Festival, as well as music videos for the album's three singles. The bonus tracks include two new songs entitled "Heads are Gonna Roll" and "Red Dress Woman", and remakes of three songs from their 2004 EP Ready to Rock.

== Personnel ==
Airbourne

- Joel O'Keeffe – lead vocals, lead guitar
- David Roads – rhythm guitar, backing vocals
- Justin Street – bass, backing vocals
- Ryan O'Keeffe – drums

Production

- Bob Marlette – producer
- Dave Schiffman – engineer
- Sid Riggs – assistant engineer
- Andy Wallace, John O'Mahony – mixing
- Jan Petrov, Mike Scielzi, Paul Suarez – mixing assistants
- Ted Jensen – mastering at Sterling Sound, New York City

== In popular culture ==
- The song "Runnin' Wild" is featured in the video games The Crew 2, Madden NFL 08, NASCAR 09, and NHL 09. It was also featured in a commercial for the video game Battlefield: Bad Company and as downloadable content for Rock Band and Rock Band 2. The song is also used in ESPN Saturday Night College Football highlights. The song is also used in Season 5, Episode 10 "Head of the Snake" of Cobra Kai as Johnny Lawrence defends himself against four of Cobra Kai's Instructors at Terry Silver's house.
- The song "Blackjack" is featured in the video games Need for Speed: ProStreet and NFL Tour.
- The song "Stand Up for Rock 'N' Roll" is featured in NHL 08, the trailer Maximum FirePower for Medal of Honor: Airborne, Madden NFL 09, Bring It On: In It to Win It and in NASCAR 08. The song was also the theme for WWE's Royal Rumble 2008 and the 2009 AHL All-Star Game.
- The song "Let's Ride" is featured in skateboarding video game Skate, in the 2008 film College, and in the teen movie Sex Drive.
- The song "Too Much, Too Young, Too Fast" is featured in Burnout Paradise and is the official theme of NASCAR 09. It is also featured in the video game Guitar Hero World Tour, in the trailer for the film I Love You, Beth Cooper, and appears in the films The Lost Boys: The Tribe and Thunderstruck.
- The song "Girls in Black" is featured in the skateboarding video game Tony Hawk's Proving Ground and the racing game Need for Speed: Undercover.
- The song "Diamond in the Rough" is constantly used during the NRL games on Friday nights and Sunday afternoons when transitioning to commercial breaks. It is also featured in the film She's Out of My League.

== Charts ==
Chart (2007–2008)	Peak position
Australian Albums (ARIA)	21
Austrian Albums (Ö3 Austria)	41
French Albums (SNEP)	95
German Albums (Offizielle Top 100)	27
New Zealand Albums (RMNZ)	39
Scottish Albums (Official Charts)	45
Swiss Albums (Schweizer Hitparade)	49
UK Albums (Official Charts)	62
UK Rock & Metal Albums (Official Charts)	4
US Billboard 200	106

== Sales certifications ==
Region	Certification	Certified units/sales
United Kingdom (BPI)	Silver	60,000^{^}
^{^} Shipments figures based on certification alone.

== Release history ==
Country	Date
Australia	23 June 2007
Japan	23 January 2008
United Kingdom	28 January 2008
United States	29 January 2008
Europe	9 June 2008
