= Runnin' Wild (Airbourne song) =

Single by Airbourne

from the album Runnin' Wild
- Released: 16 May 2007
- Genre: Hard rock
- Length: 3:38
- Label: Roadrunner U.S. EMI Australia
- Songwriter: Joel O'Keeffe
- Producer: Bob Marlette

Airbourne singles chronology
"Runnin' Wild" (2007)	"Too Much, Too Young, Too Fast" (2007)

"Runnin' Wild" is the 1st single from the album Runnin' Wild by the Australian hard rock band Airbourne.

== Music video ==
The music video for this song shows Airbourne in the back of a truck playing while being chased by the LAPD. It also features a guest appearance by Lemmy Kilmister of Motörhead as the driver of the truck, eventually locking the pursuing policemen inside the truck (whilst wearing a Motörhead jacket) after it has stopped and the band has left it.

== Personnel ==
- Joel O'Keeffe - lead vocals, lead guitar
- David Roads - rhythm guitar, backing vocals
- Justin Street - bass, backing vocals
- Ryan O'Keeffe - drums

== Chart performance ==
Chart (2008)	Peak position
Canada Hot 100 (Billboard)	90
US Mainstream Rock (Billboard)	22

== Release history ==
Country	Date
Australia	16 May 2007
United States	25 September 2007

== In popular culture ==
"Runnin' Wild" is featured in the EA Sports video games Madden 08, NASCAR 09 and NHL 09, and was featured in a commercial for the 2008 game Battlefield: Bad Company. It is also usually played during warmups at Philadelphia Flyers games. The track was released as downloadable content for the music video game Rock Band on August 12, 2008 and later for Rock Band 2, but was removed for purchase on March 19, 2010 for unknown reasons. It was also used in the trailer for the 2010 Disney animated movie Tangled as well as TV spots for another Disney film, Frozen. The 2016 movie Bad Moms features the song where the main characters rush to the PTA meeting leading up to the climactic scene. It is also featured in an online racing video game The Crew 2 on radio station “Rock This.” The song is also used in Season 5, Episode 10 "Head of the Snake" of Cobra Kai as Johnny Lawrence defends himself against four of Cobra Kai's Instructors at Terry Silver's house.
