= United States Cavalry =

Formerly the cavalry branch of the U.S. Army (1775–1950)

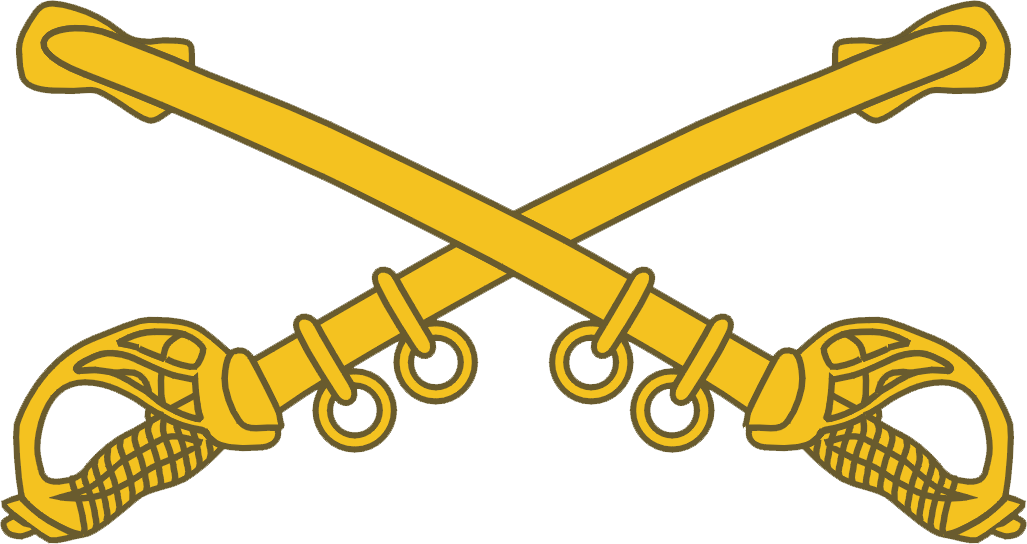
- Insignia of the Cavalry
- Active: 1775–1950
- Country: United States
- Branch: Army
- Type: Cavalry
- Patron: Saint George
- Colors: Yellow

Insignia
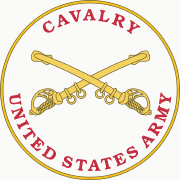
- Branch plaque

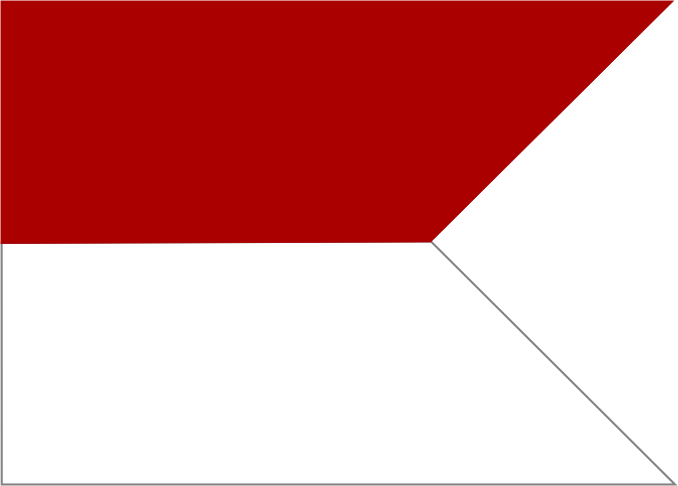
- Guidon

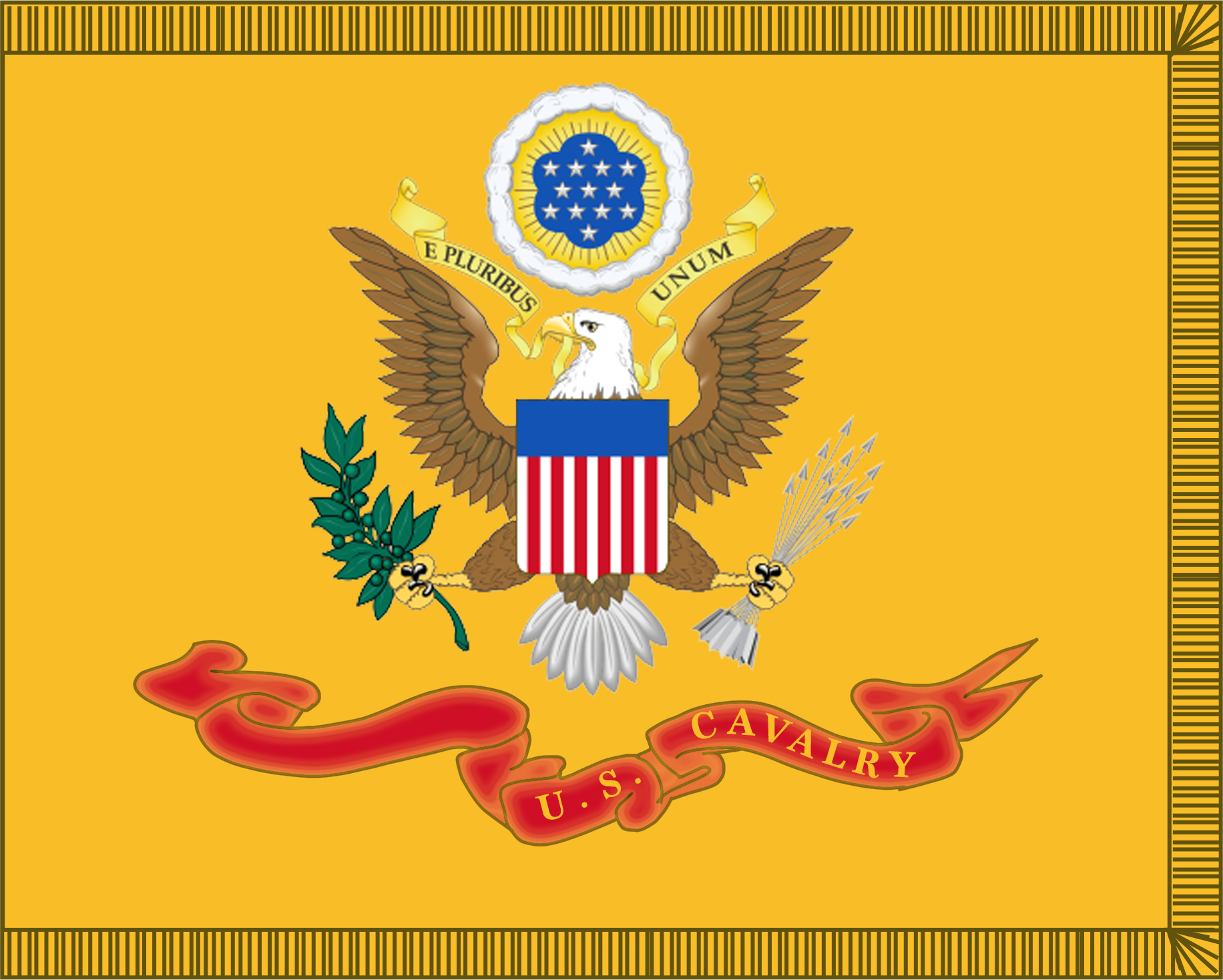
- Standard

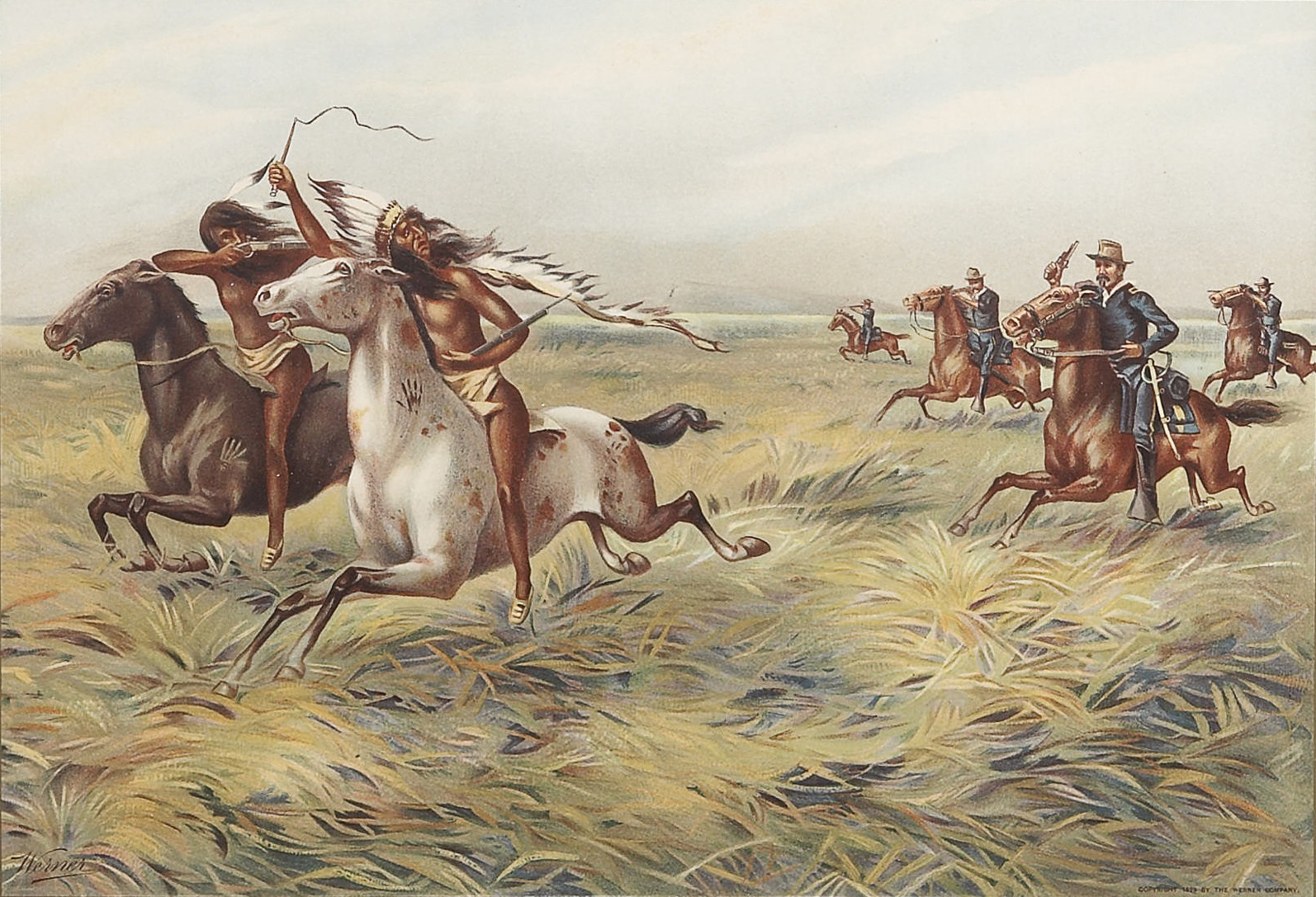
Mid-19th-century U.S. Cavalrymen (right) pursuing Plains Indians.

The United States Cavalry, or U.S. Cavalry, is the designation of the mounted force of the United States Army. The United States Cavalry was formally created by an act of Congress on 3 August 1861. From the United States Declaration of Independence and the American War of Independence onwards, mounted troops were raised ad-hoc by the United States as emergencies presented themselves and were disbanded as soon as these had passed. In 1833, Congress created the 1st U.S. Dragoons, followed by the 2nd U.S. Dragoons and the U.S. Mounted Riflemen 1836 and 1846 respectively. The 1861 Act converted the U.S. Army's two regiments of dragoons, one regiment of mounted riflemen, and two regiments of cavalry into one branch of service. Immediately preceding World War II (1941–1945), the U.S. Cavalry began transitioning to a mechanized, mounted force. During the Second World War, the Army's cavalry units operated as horse-mounted, mechanized, or dismounted forces (infantry). The last horse-mounted cavalry charge by a U.S. Cavalry unit took place on the Bataan Peninsula, in the Philippines in early 1942. The 26th Cavalry Regiment of the allied Philippine Scouts executed the charge against Imperial Japanese Army forces near the village of Morong on 16 January 1942. In March 1942, the War Department eliminated the office of Chief of Cavalry and effectively abolished the horse cavalry. The cavalry branch was absorbed into the Armor branch as part of the Army Reorganization Act of 1950 and the Vietnam War saw the introduction of helicopters and operations as a helicopter-borne force with the designation of Air Cavalry, while mechanized cavalry received the designation of Armored Cavalry.

The term "cavalry", still remains in use in the U.S. Army for mounted (ground and aviation) reconnaissance, surveillance, and target acquisition (RSTA) units based on their parent Combat Arms Regimental System (CARS) regiment. The 1st Cavalry Division is the only active division in the United States Army with a cavalry designation and maintains a detachment of horse-mounted cavalry for ceremonial purposes.

== History ==
The United States Cavalry existed in various forms from 1775 to 1942. Its history dates back to the American Revolutionary War, and every major subsequent war in which the United States was involved. George Washington personally witnessed the effect that a small mounted force of the British Army's 17th Regiment of (Light) Dragoons had on his troops, panicking and scattering American soldiers at the Battle of White Plains. Appreciating the ability of the 5th Regiment of Connecticut Light Horse Militia to gather intelligence during the subsequent retreat of American forces into New Jersey, he asked the Continental Congress to approve the creation of a light cavalry force in the Continental Army. In late 1776, Congress authorized Washington to establish a mounted force of 3,000 men for service in the Continental army.

=== Revolutionary War ===
On 12 December 1776, Congress converted the 5th Regiment of Connecticut Light Horse Militia into the Regiment of Light Dragoons. In March 1777, Washington established the Corps of Continental Light Dragoons consisting of four regiments of 280 men, each organized in six troops. Later that year, the 2nd Continental Light Dragoons executed the first recorded cavalry charge by American forces at the Battle of the Flockey on August 13, 1777, routing Loyalist militia in Schoharie County, New York. Many problems faced the light dragoon regiments, including the inability of recruiting to bring the units to authorized strength, shortage of suitable cavalry weapons and horses, and lack of uniformity among troopers in dress and discipline. Congress appointed the Hungarian revolutionary and professional soldier Michael Kovats and the Polish Casimir Pulaski to train them as an offensive strike force during winter quarters of 1777–78 at Trenton, New Jersey.

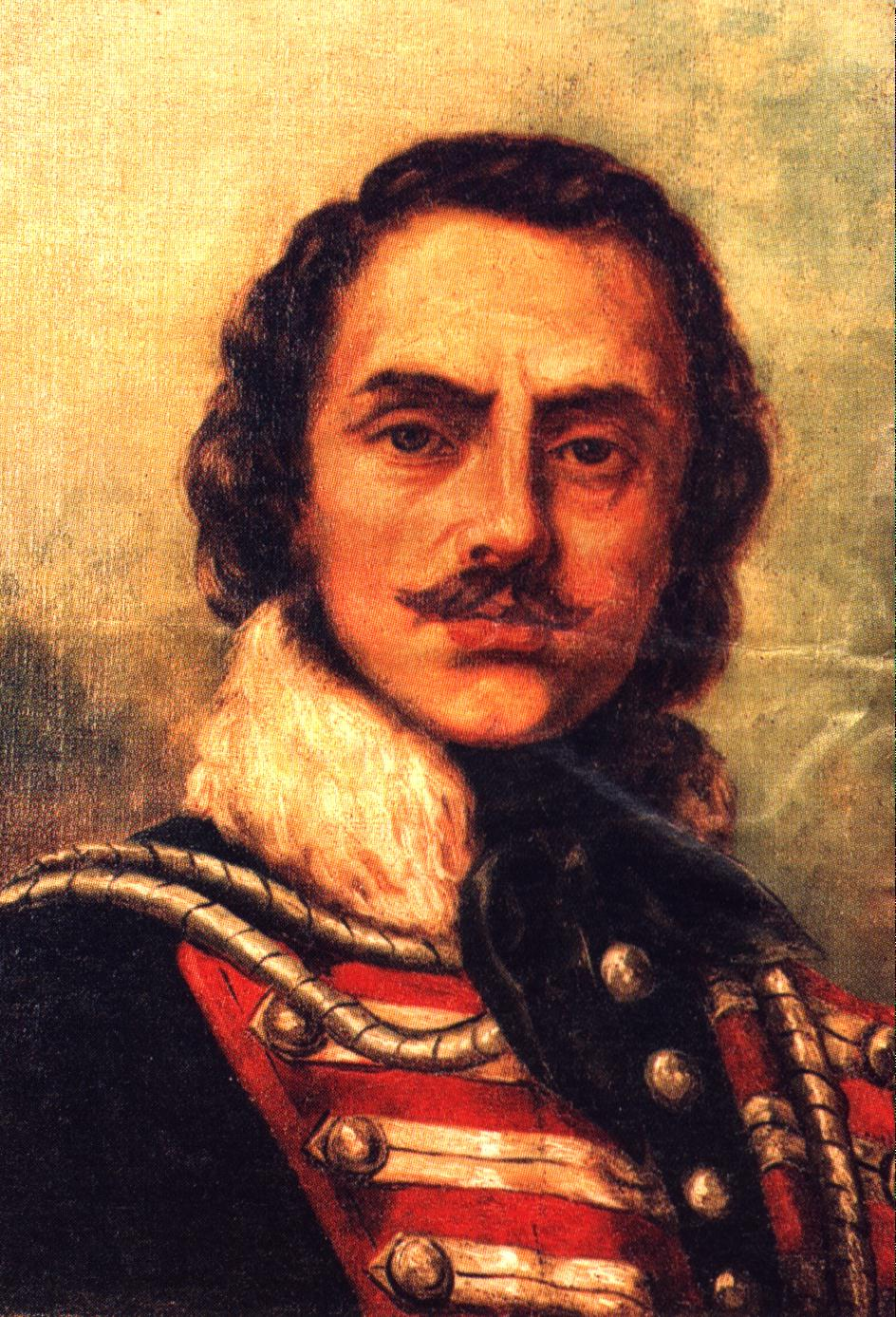
Polish nobleman and soldier Casimir Pulaski was one of the founders and "fathers of American cavalry".

Pulaski's efforts led to friction with the American officers, resulting in his resignation, but Congress authorized Pulaski to form his own independent corps in 1778. Pulaski's Legion consisted of dragoons, riflemen, grenadiers, and infantry. Another independent corps of dragoons joined Pulaski's in the Continental Line during 1778 when a former captain in Bland's Horse, "Light Horse Harry" Lee, formed Lee's Corps of Partisan Light Dragoons, which specialized in raiding and harassing supply lines. Colonel Charles Armand Tuffin, marquis de la Rouërie ("Col. Armand"), a French nobleman, raised a third corps of infantry in Boston, called the Free and Independent Chasseurs, which later added a troop of dragoons, becoming Armand's Legion. Although a reorganization in 1778 authorized expansion of the four regiments to 415 men each, forage difficulties, expiration of enlistments, desertions, and other problems made this impossible, and no regiment ever carried more than 200 men on its rolls, and they averaged 120 to 180 men between 1778 and 1780.

In 1779, Washington ordered the 2nd and 4th Continental Light Dragoons equipped temporarily as infantry, and deployed the 1st and 3rd Continental Light Dragoons and Pulaski's Legion to the South to join local militia cavalry and to ensure the area remained American during an unexpected counter-offensive. Battle engagements in South Carolina largely seriously attrited the 1st and 3rd Regiments in the spring of 1780, who amalgamated into a single unit. Following the capture of Charleston, South Carolina on 12 May 1780, the remnants tried to regroup and reconstitute in Virginia and North Carolina. In August 1780, Armand's Legion was with General Gates at the disastrous Battle of Camden.

The most significant engagement of the war involving Continental light dragoons was the Battle of Cowpens in January 1781. Southern theater commander General Nathanael Greene reorganized part of Lee's Legion and elements of the amalgamated 1st and 3rd Light Dragoons in Charlotte and dispatched them on a series of raids against Loyalist forces in western Carolina. The dragoons joined the "flying corps" commanded by General Daniel Morgan at the Battle of Cowpens, securing a crucial victory for the American forces in the early stages of the war. Later, the 3rd Legionary Corps participated in Greene's maneuvers across North Carolina and fought well against Cornwallis's army at Guilford Courthouse.

In January 1781, the practice of the dragoons employing both mounted and dismounted troops resulted in their official reconfiguration as Legionary Corps, the mounted dragoons supported by dismounted dragoons armed as infantry, an organization that persisted until the war's end. In 1783, the Continental Army was discharged and the dragoons were released.

=== War of 1812 ===
The first cavalry unit formed by the Congress of the United States of America (along with three new regular infantry regiments) was a squadron of light dragoons commanded by Major Michael Rudolph on 5 March 1792. Its four troops were assigned to each of the four sublegions of Legion of the United States, by September 1792. In 1796, the number of troops was reduced to only two, which were amalgamated in 1798 with six newly raised troops to the Regiment of Regiment of Light Dragoons. This mounted force was short lived as well and saw its end in 1800. The oldest two "veterans" troops were retained until June 1802. Hence no regular mounted soldiers existed for the next six years.

In 1798, during the Quasi-War with France, Congress established a three-year "Provisional Army" of 10,000 men, consisting of twelve regiments of infantry and six troops of light dragoons. By March 1799 Congress created an "Eventual Army" of 30,000 men, including three regiments of cavalry. Both "armies" existed only on paper, but equipment for 3,000 men and horses was procured and stored.

The Congressional act of 12 April 1808 authorized a standing regiment of light dragoons consisting of eight troops. As war loomed, Congress authorized another regiment of light dragoons on 11 January 1812. These regiments were respectively known afterwards as the First and Second United States Dragoons.

In 1813, Secretary of War John Armstrong Jr. granted Colonel Richard Mentor Johnson permission to raise two battalions of volunteer cavalry. Johnson recruited 1,200 men, divided into 14 companies.

Congress combined the First and Second United States Dragoons into one Regiment of Light Dragoons on 30 March 1814. This was a cost-cutting measure; it was cheaper and easier to maintain one unit at full strength than two organizations that could not maintain a full complement of riders. The signing of the Treaty of Ghent at the end of the year ended the war. The regiment was disbanded on 3 March 1815, with the explanation that cavalry forces were too expensive to maintain as part of a standing army. The retained officers and men were folded into the Corps of Artillery by 15 June 1815, all others were discharged.

=== Westward expansion ===
The "plains cavalry" played an important role in extending American hegemony into western North America by forcefully subduing and displacing Native Americans from their lands during the western Indian Wars, thereby making way for colonists of primarily European descent. In 1832, Congress formed the Battalion of Mounted Rangers to protect settlers along the east bank of the Mississippi River and to keep the Santa Fe trail open. The battalion comprised volunteers organized into six companies of 100 men. To correct what was perceived as a lack of discipline, organization and reliability, Congress formed the United States Regiment of Dragoons as a regular force in 1833, consisting of 10 companies (designated A through K) with a total of 750 men. The Regiment fought against the Seminole nation in 1835, when Chief Osceola led warriors from his tribe in the Second Seminole War in protest to the Treaty of Payne's Landing. For a year, the established units had difficulty containing the Indians. Congress responded by establishing the 2nd United States Regiment of Dragoons in 1836.

=== War with Mexico ===
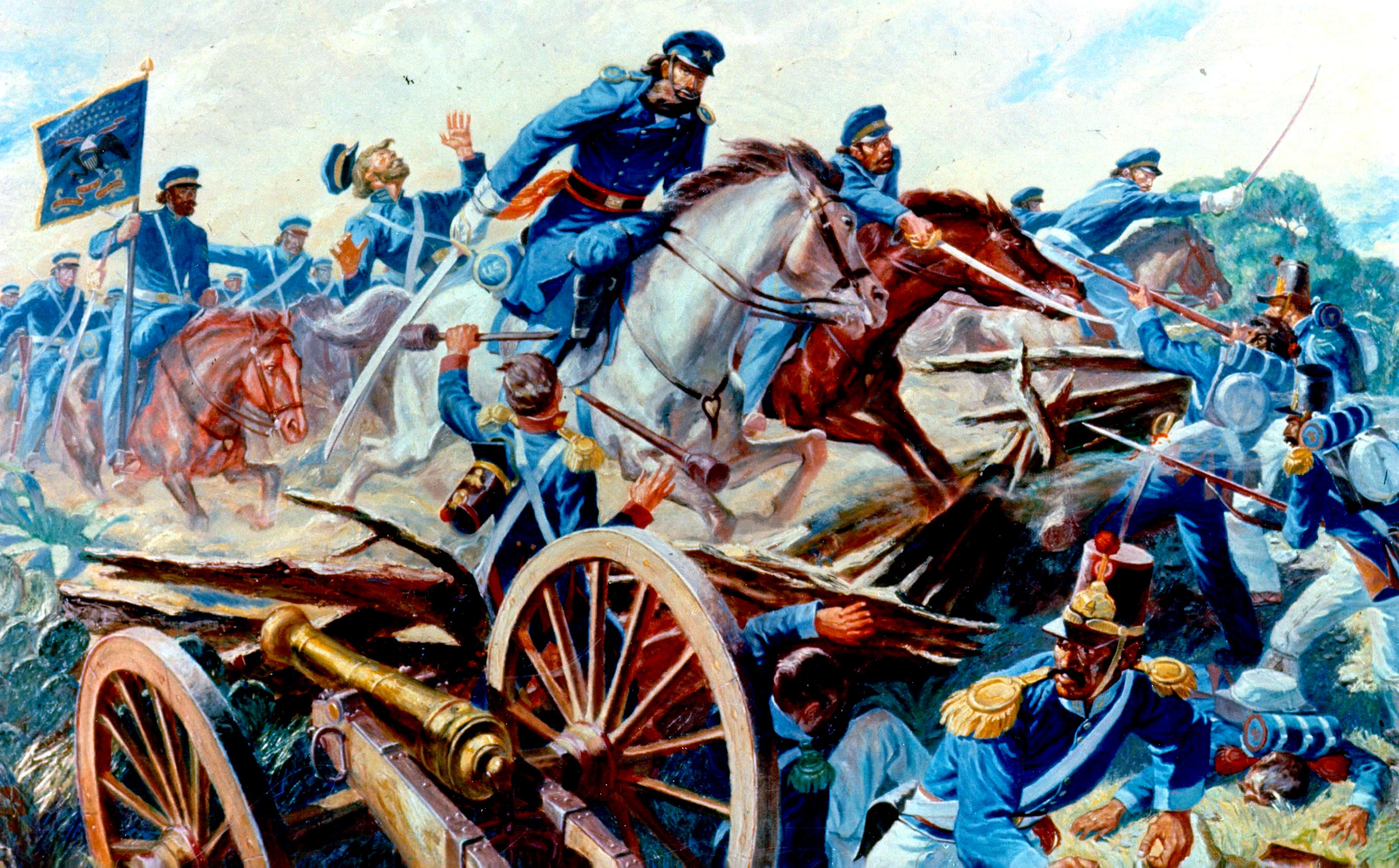
Captain Charles A. May's squadron of the 2d Dragoons slashes through the Mexican Army lines.

The First Dragoons served in the Mexican War, and Charles A. May's squadron of the Second Dragoons helped decide the Battle of Resaca de la Palma.

=== Civil War ===
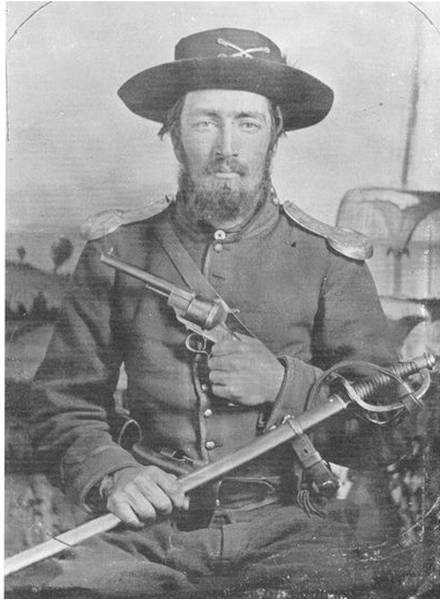
A US Civil war soldier Cavalry [North] with sabre and Lefaucheux pistol; he wears shoulder scales as part of his dress uniform.

Shortly before the outbreak of the Civil War, the Army's dragoon regiments were designated as "Cavalry", losing their previous distinctions. The change was an unpopular one and the former dragoons retained their orange braided blue jackets until they wore out and had to be replaced with cavalry yellow. The 1st United States Cavalry fought in virtually every campaign in the north during the American Civil War.

=== Indian wars ===
The U.S. Cavalry played a prominent role in the American Indian Wars, particularly in the American Old West. Particularly notable were the 7th Cavalry, associated with General George Armstrong Custer and the Battle of the Little Bighorn, and the 9th and 10th Cavalry, the Buffalo Soldiers. Infantry units, called by the Indians "walkaheaps", were also involved and in some cases were the main force deployed. Infantry, when mounted, were called "mounted infantry"; they lacked training and skill in horsemanship and cavalry tactics.

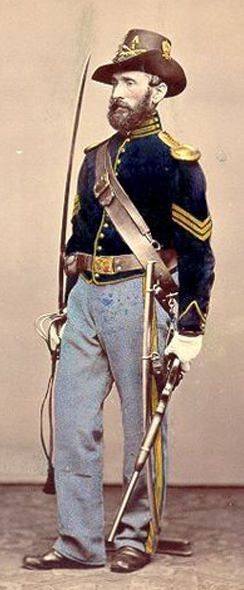
Company "A" 1st US Cavalry Sgt wearing Hardee hat, 1866

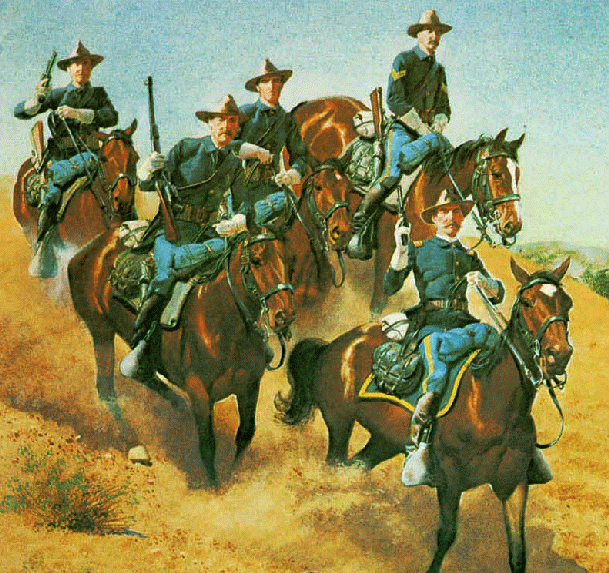
U.S. Army poster illustrating field uniforms circa 1876

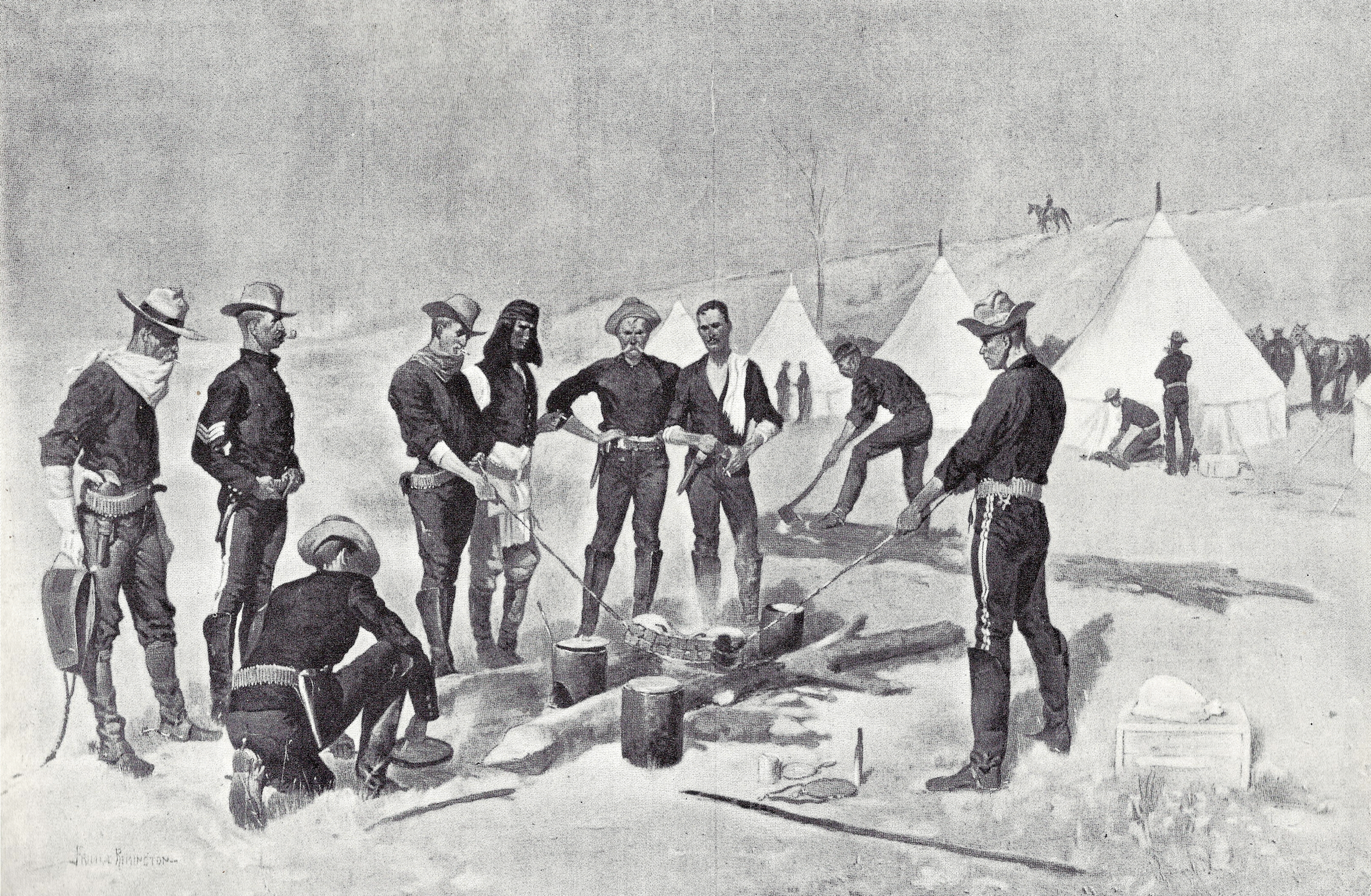
Roasting the Christmas Beef, Frederic Remington, Harper's Weekly, 24 December 1892

=== Spanish–American War ===
Several Cavalry regiments served in Cuba, the 1st, 2d, 3rd Cavalry Regiments along with the African-American 9th and 10th Cavalry and also the 1st US Volunteer Cavalry, the Rough Riders. Of all the cavalry regiments, only the 3rd went to Cuba with their normal complement of horses. For the rest, only the officers' horses went as there was not enough room on the ship to bring all the horses to Cuba, and those that were not used by the officers were used to pull equipment. Likewise, all of the cavalry units except the mounted 3rd Cavalry were organized into two brigades that made up the Cavalry Division led by former Confederate cavalryman, General Joseph Wheeler. Wheeler's Cavalry Division was part of the other 2 infantry divisions and independent brigade that made up the V Corps headed by General Shafter. Several other cavalry regiments from the West Coast were sent to Puerto Rico and the Philippines. Units of Wheeler's Cavalry Division fought at both the Battle of Las Guasimas on 24 June 1898 and the Battle of San Juan Heights on 1 July 1898.

=== World War I ===
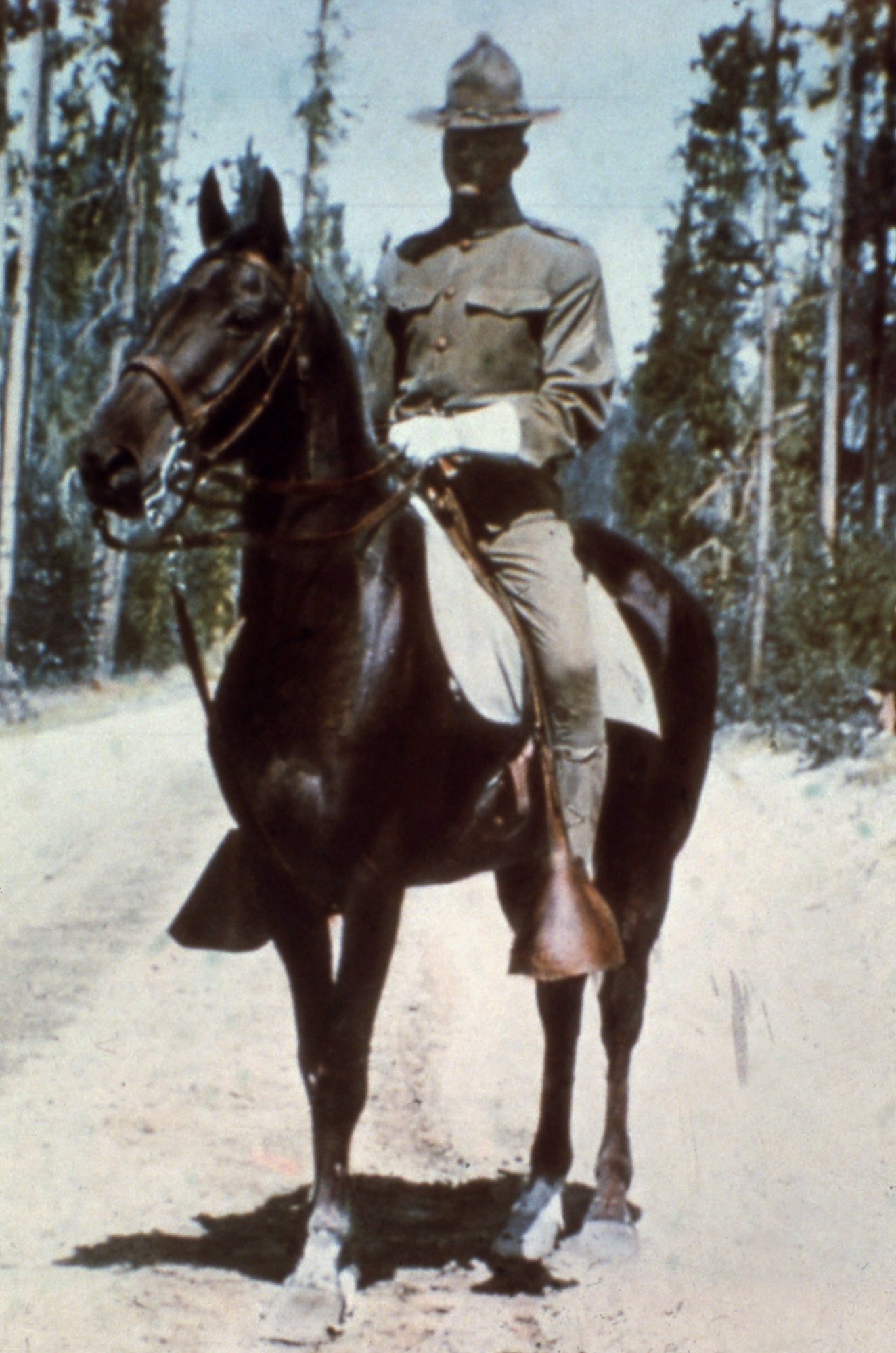
Cavalryman circa World War I era

The 15th Cavalry Division was created in February 1917 at Fort Sam Houston, Texas. Originally trained for deployment to Europe, its units were later converted into field artillery units. The division was deactivated on 12 May 1918.

=== Post-World War I ===
Proponents of horse cavalry argued that the lack of success of cavalry on World War I's static defensive lines had been an exception, and that cavalry still had a role to play in warfare, even as the U.S. Army's mechanization continued.

The American Expeditionary Forces convened a Cavalry Board to consider the future of horse cavalry; this panel concluded that the employment of large cavalry units was probably obsolete, but that horse cavalry units of regiment size and below could be attached to infantry and armor units for reconnaissance and similar missions on an as needed basis. The Army accepted this recommendation, and continued to field horse cavalry units in the 1920s and 1930s.

As part of the National Defense Act of 1920, the Army created the Office of the Chief of Cavalry; the chief would be a temporary major general, and would be empowered to supervise cavalry activities, including personnel management, equipment development and fielding, and creation and implementation of tactics, doctrine, and training. Willard Ames Holbrook was appointed as the first Chief of Cavalry, and he served until 1924.

==== Regular Army and Philippine Scouts ====
The personnel and assets of the 15th Cavalry Division were later used to form 1st & 2nd Cavalry Divisions. On 20 August 1921, as a result of lessons learned from World War I, the Army's Adjutant General, Major General Peter C. Harris, constituted the 1st and 2nd Cavalry Divisions to meet future mobilization requirements. However, the 2nd Cavalry Division was not subsequently activated, and remained in 'on-paper' organizational limbo for twenty years. In 1922 the 26th Cavalry Regiment (United States), Philippine Scouts, was formed in the Philippines. In 1927, the Adjutant General constituted the I Cavalry Corps (the headquarters of which was never fully activated), and the 3rd Cavalry Division, new Regular Army formations.

==== National Guard ====
In 1921, the 21st through 24th Cavalry Divisions were formed in the National Guard, with the First, Second, and Third Army Areas supporting the 21st, 22nd, and 24th, respectively. The 23rd was the nation's at-large cavalry division, supported by all army areas (Alabama, Massachusetts, New Mexico, North Carolina, Tennessee, Texas, and Wisconsin Army National Guards). In a short time the divisions had the prescribed cavalry regiments and machine gun squadrons but not the majority of their support organizations. The 56th Cavalry Brigade was a separate cavalry brigade.

==== Organized Reserve ====
To create the Organized Reserve cavalry divisions, the War Department added the 61st, 62nd; 63rd; 64th, 65th and 66th Cavalry Divisions to the rolls of the Army on 15 October 1921.

==== Segregated cavalry units ====
In the midst of the 1940 presidential campaign prominent black leaders complained bitterly to President Franklin D. Roosevelt about the limited number of black units. Under political pressure the Army activated the 2nd Cavalry Division at Fort Riley, Kansas, on 1 April 1941, with one white and one black brigade. The black brigade, the 4th Cavalry Brigade was activated during February 1941 with the 9th Cavalry Regiment and 10th Cavalry Regiment, the "Buffalo Soldiers," as its cavalry regiments. In addition, a further black cavalry regiment, the 27th Cavalry Regiment (Colored), 2nd Cavalry Division, was also activated in April 1941.

==== Mechanization ====
During the interwar period, the Army commenced experimenting with mechanization and had partially mechanized some cavalry regiments. In 1940, the National Guard cavalry divisions were disbanded; some of their cavalry regiments partially retain horses as "horse-mechanized" regiments, while others were converted into other types of units, such as antiaircraft artillery or field artillery, or used to complete inactive parts of existing units. During the war, many of the Army's cavalry units were mechanized with tanks and reconnaissance vehicles, while others fought dismounted as infantry. Some units were converted into other types of units entirely, some of which made use of the cavalry's experience with horses. The "Mars Men" of the China Burma India Theater give such an example.

=== World War II ===
Because of a shortage of men, on 15 July 1942, the 2nd Cavalry Division was inactivated to permit organization of the 9th Armored Division. White cavalrymen were assigned to the 9th Armored Division, and the all-black 4th Cavalry Brigade became a non-divisional formation.

As part of a large-scale Army reorganization in March 1942, the Chief of Staff of the Army, General George Marshall, abolished the position of branch chief in the ground arms, including for the Cavalry. The branch chiefs' functions were centralized within the new Army Ground Forces headquarters as part of an effort to consolidate and streamline the integration of training and doctrine among the Army's different branches.

Before World War II the 106th Cavalry was a National Guard unit based in Chicago, Illinois. Prior to World War I and the Spanish–American War it had been known as the 1st Illinois Volunteer Cavalry. The 106th underwent a number of different reorganizations until 1 September 1940, when it was redesignated the 1st Squadron, 106th Cavalry (Horse-Mechanized).

On 25 February 1943 the 2nd Cavalry Division was (re)activated. The 27th Cavalry Regiment was attached to the 5th Cavalry Brigade (Colored) on 25 February 1943. It was deactivated 27 March 1944 and personnel later reorganized into the 6400th Ordnance Battalion (Ammo) (Provisional) 12 June 1944. The 28th Cavalry Regiment (Colored), 2nd Cavalry Division, activated February 1942 and attached to the 5th Cavalry Brigade (Colored) on 25 February 1943. It was deactivated 31 March 1944 and personnel later reorganized into the 6400th Ordnance Battalion (Ammo) (Provisional) 12 June 1944.

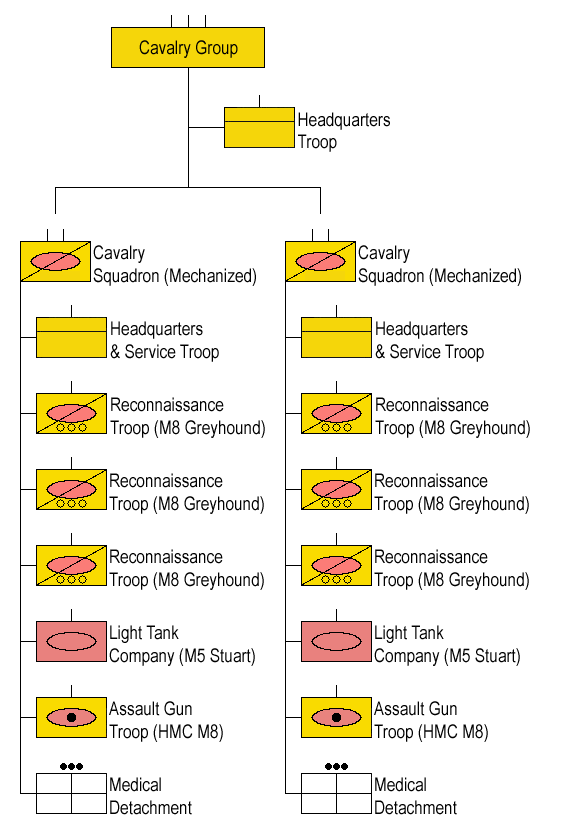
Structure of a Cavalry Group, Mechanized, during 1944–1945

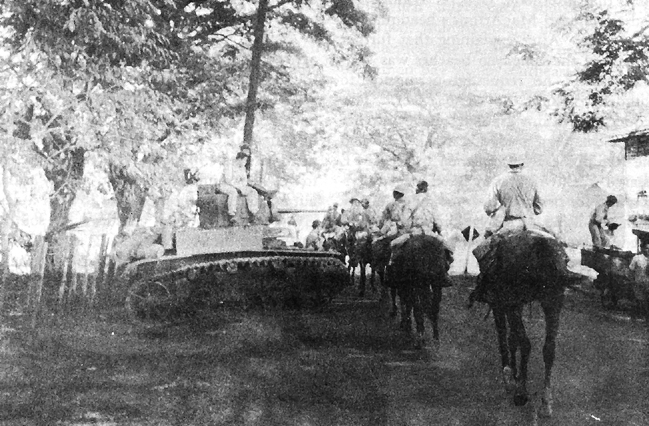
26th Cavalry moving into Pozorrubio

The last horse cavalry charge by a U.S. Army cavalry unit took place against Japanese forces during the fighting in the Bataan Peninsula, Philippines, in the village of Morong on 16 January 1942, by the 26th Cavalry Regiment of the Philippine Scouts. Shortly thereafter, the besieged combined United States-Philippine forces were forced to slaughter their horses for food and the 26th Regiment fought on foot or in whatever scarce vehicles were available until their surrender.

The 10th Mountain Cavalry Reconnaissance Troop of the 10th Mountain Division, while not designated as U.S. Cavalry, conducted the last horse-mounted charge of any Army organization while engaged in Austria in 1945. An impromptu pistol charge by the Third Platoon was carried out when the Troop encountered a machine gun nest in an Italian village/town sometime between 14 and 23 April 1945.

==== Mechanized cavalry ====
The principal reconnaissance element of an infantry division was a mechanized cavalry troop, whilst an armored division was provided with a full cavalry squadron. Several cavalry groups, each of two squadrons, were formed to serve as the reconnaissance elements for U.S. corps headquarters in the European Theater of Operations during 1944–45.

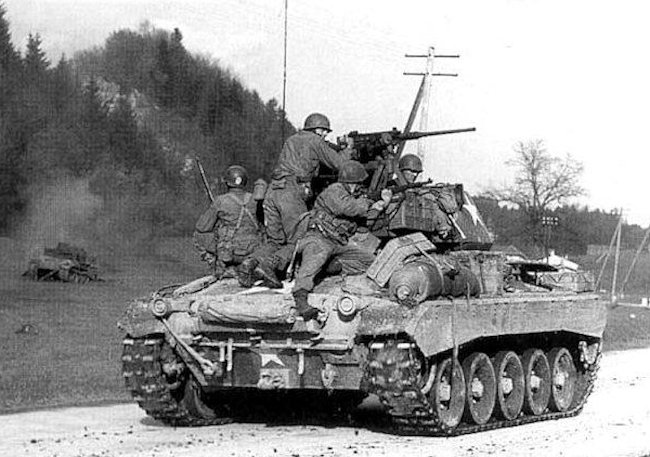
The new M24 Chaffee light tank that was issued to the 106th Cavalry Group in February 1945. Its 75 mm gun was vastly superior to the M5A1 Stuart tank.

Besides HQ and service elements, each cavalry troop comprised three cavalry platoons, each of which was equipped with six Bantam jeeps and three M8 Greyhound armored cars.

Three of the jeeps were mounted with a 60mm mortar manned by two soldiers; the other three had a bracket-mounted .30 caliber machine gun, manned by a soldier sitting in the front passenger seat – although sometimes the M1919 was replaced by a .50 caliber machine gun. To maximize speed and maneuverability on the battlefield, the Bantams were not given extra armor protection.

The M8 Greyhound was a six-wheeled, lightweight armored car, mounting a 37 mm gun in a movable turret that could swing a full 360 degrees. It also featured a .30 caliber machine gun that could move independently of the turret. The M8 was equipped with powerful FM radios to enable battlefield communications.

A cavalry squadron comprised a HQ Troop, three cavalry troops (four for those in armored divisions), a light tank company and an assault gun troop.

The light tank company had 17 tanks; two in the company headquarters and three platoons of five tanks. Initially, the tanks were M3 Stuarts, later M5 Stuarts; both of which were equipped with 37mm guns. The Stuart was capable of speeds of up to 36 mph (58 km/h) on the road. While fast and maneuverable, its armor plating and cannon were soon found to be no match for the German tanks. In February 1945 they were replaced with the M24 Chaffee light tank, which was equipped with a 75 mm gun.

The assault gun troop comprised three assault gun platoons (four for those in armored divisions), each with two M8 HMCs – M5 Stuarts with their turrets replaced by an open-turreted 75 mm howitzer – and two M3 Half-tracks; one for the platoon HQ, the other for the ammunition section.

The experience gained in the use of the mechanized cavalry groups during World War II led to the eventual postwar formation of armored cavalry regiments to act as corps reconnaissance and screening elements.

=== Vietnam ===
The Vietnam War saw the first combat use of air cavalry warfare. Twenty armored and air cavalry units were deployed to Vietnam during the war. Armored cavalry units in Vietnam were initially equipped with the M48A3 Patton tank, armed with a 90 mm main gun, and the M113 Armored Cavalry Assault Vehicle (ACAV). In January 1969, the cavalry began transitioning from the Patton tank to the M551 Sheridan Armored Airborne Reconnaissance Assault Vehicle. By 1970, all armored cavalry units in Vietnam were operating the Sheridan except for the tank companies of the 11th ACR, which continued to use Patton tanks.

==== U. S. Armored Cavalry (Ground Cavalry Units) in the Vietnam War ====
- 1st Squadron, 1st Cavalry; attached to the 23rd Infantry Division (Americal), but remained assigned to the 1st Armored Division
- Troop E, 1st Cavalry; assigned to 11th Infantry Brigade, Americal Division
- 2nd Squadron, 1st Cavalry; attached to the 4th Infantry Division (Ivy Division), but remained assigned to the 2nd Armored Division
- 1st Squadron, 4th Cavalry; assigned to the 1st Infantry Division (Big Red One)
- 3rd Squadron, 4th Cavalry; assigned to the 25th Infantry Division (Tropic Lightning)
- 3rd Squadron, 5th Cavalry; assigned to the 9th Infantry Division (Old Reliables); 1971 attached to 1st Brigade 5th (Mech) Infantry Division (Red Diamond), in I Corps near DMZ
- 1st Squadron, 10th Cavalry; assigned to the 4th Infantry Division
- 11th Armored Cavalry Regiment; II Field Force. The 11th ACR (Blackhorse) was the only full Cavalry Regiment in Vietnam, consisting of 3 squadrons (1st, 2nd, and 3rd) and commanded by WWII General Patton's son Colonel George S. Patton Jr.
- Troop A, 4th Squadron, 12th Cavalry; assigned to 1st Brigade 5th (Mech) Infantry Division
- Troop B, 1st Squadron, 17th Cavalry; assigned to 82nd Airborne Division (All American)
- 2nd Squadron, 17th Cavalry; assigned to 101st Airborne Division (Screaming Eagle). December 1968 to June 1969 both 2/17 Cav and 101st Abn Div converted to Airmobile units.
- Troop D, 17th Cavalry; assigned to 199th Infantry Brigade (Light Brigade). Deactivated Oct 1970/reactivated Apr 1972 as an Air Cavalry Troop.
- Troop E, 17th Cavalry; assigned to 173rd Airborne Brigade
- Troop F, 17th Cavalry; assigned to 196th Infantry Brigade (Light Brigade), Americal Division
- Troop H, 17th Cavalry; assigned to 198th Infantry Brigade (Light Brigade), Americal Division. Deactivated Oct 1971/reactivated Apr 1972 as an Air Cavalry Troop.

During the Vietnam War U.S. Cavalry squadrons were normally assigned or attached to army divisions. Army brigades were only authorized one cavalry Troop, as was the case with "A" Troop, 4/12 Cavalry. When only the 1st Brigade of the 5th (Mechanized) Infantry Division deployed to the Republic of South Vietnam (RVN), only one cavalry troop was assigned to the brigade, Troop A.

== Contemporary cavalry and dragoons ==
=== Recent developments ===
The 1st Dragoons was reformed in the Vietnam era as 1st Squadron, 1st Cavalry. Today's modern 1–1st Cavalry is a scout/attack unit, equipped with M1A1 Abrams tanks and M3 Bradley CFVs.

Another modern U.S. Army unit informally known as the 2nd Dragoons is the 2nd Cavalry Regiment (Stryker). This unit was originally organized as the Second Dragoon Regiment in 1836 until it was renamed the Second Cavalry Regiment in 1860, morphing into the 2nd Armored Cavalry Regiment in the 1960s. The regiment is currently equipped with the Stryker family of wheeled fighting vehicles. As equipped with the Stryker, the 2nd Cavalry once again can be accurately referred to as a "dragoon" force – mounted infantry.

=== Traditions ===
The cavalry, like any other military force, has its own unique traditions and history. These traditions include the Order of the Spur; Spurs are issued to cavalry soldiers in Gold, for the completion of a tour of combat service and in Silver for the completion of what is commonly called the "Spur Ride". The Cavalry traditions also include: the Stetson, Stetson Cords, Fiddler's Green poem, and the Order of the Yellow Rose. Units in the modern Army with the armor and cavalry designation have adopted the black Stetson hat as unofficial semi dress headgear, recalling the black felt campaign hats of the American frontier era. Where as the Quarter-Cav still wears the brown felt Stetsons.

=== Cavalry designation ===
The distinct cavalry branch ceased to exist when it was absorbed into the Armor branch in 1950. Other regiments of both armored and air cavalry exist in the Army. The patches on 1st Cavalry Division helicopters that served in Vietnam retained the symbol of a horse, symbolizing the mobility that characterized the original horse cavalry. In spite of the formal disbanding of the branch, however, the recognition of it continues on within the Army's armor and aviation branches, where some officers choose cavalry branch insignia over the very similar armor branch insignia or aviation "prop and wing" insignia.

The primary enlisted Army military occupational specialty in use in cavalry units is 19D, armored cavalry reconnaissance specialist, or cavalry scout. Officers are often branch detailed either from the Armor branch or the Infantry branch to lead Cavalry soldiers. In Reconnaissance, Surveillance, and Target Acquisition (RSTA) cavalry squadrons that are part of infantry brigade combat teams (IBCT), one troop (typically the "C" troop) is always a dismounted reconnaissance troop consisting of 11B infantry scouts and 11C infantry mortars.

The 1st Cavalry Division is the only presently existing division of the Army that retains the "cavalry" name and the division retains one detachment of ceremonial horse cavalry for morale and ceremonial purposes. In addition to a division headquarters and headquarters battalion, division artillery, and a sustainment brigade, the division is otherwise divided into three armored brigade combat teams and one combat aviation brigade. Both types of brigades contain subordinate units (armored cavalry squadrons and an attack/reconnaissance squadron, respectively) that perform traditional cavalry tasks.

=== Current units ===
Active units:

(number of active squadrons in parentheses)

- 1st U.S. Dragoons organized 1833. Redesignated 1st U.S. Cavalry 1861.
- 2nd U.S. Dragoons organized 1836. Redesignated 2nd U.S. Cavalry 1861
- U.S. Mounted Riflemen organized 1846. Redesignated 3rd U.S. Cavalry 1861
- 1st Cavalry Regiment organized 1855. Redesignated 4th U.S. Cavalry 1861.
- 2nd Cavalry Regiment organized 1855. Redesignated 5th U.S. Cavalry 1861.
- 3rd Cavalry Regiment (4), organized 4 May 1861. Redesignated 6th U.S. Cavalry 29 July 1861.
- 4th Cavalry Regiment (5), organized 1861
- 5th Cavalry Regiment (2), organized 1861
- 6th Cavalry Regiment (4), organized 1861
- 7th Cavalry Regiment (5), organized 1866
- 8th Cavalry Regiment (4), organized 1866
- 9th Cavalry Regiment (3), organized 1866
- 10th Cavalry Regiment (1), (Buffalo Soldiers) Colored Regiment, organized 28 July 1866
- 11th Armored Cavalry Regiment (2), organized 2 February 1901
- 12th Cavalry Regiment (2), organized February 1901
- 13th Cavalry Regiment (2), organized 1901
- 14th Cavalry Regiment (2), organized 1901
- 15th Cavalry Regiment, organized 1901 US Army Training and Doctrine Command unit
- 16th Cavalry Regiment, organized 1916 US Army Armor School
- 17th Cavalry Regiment (5), organized 1916.
- 32nd Cavalry Regiment (1)
- 33rd Cavalry Regiment (1)
- 38th Cavalry Regiment (3) part of Battlefield Surveillance Brigades
- 40th Cavalry Regiment (1) cryptographic data team
- 61st Cavalry Regiment (2)
- 71st Cavalry Regiment (2), reestablished in 2004
- 73rd Cavalry Regiment (4)
- 75th Cavalry Regiment (1)
- 89th Cavalry Regiment (2)
- 91st Cavalry Regiment (1)
- 1st Cavalry Division organized 1921

Army National Guard:

- 18th Cavalry Regiment, CA ARNG
- 2nd Squadron, 101st Cavalry Regiment, 27th IBCT, NY ARNG
- 102nd Cavalry Regiment, NJ ARNG (1)
- 104th Cavalry Regiment, PA ARNG
- 105th Cavalry Regiment, WI ARNG
- 106th Cavalry Regiment, reestablished in 2006
- 107th Cavalry Regiment, OH ARNG
- 108th Cavalry Regiment, GA ARNG
- 112th Cavalry Regiment, TX ARNG
- 113th Cavalry Regiment, IA ARNG
- 116th Cavalry Brigade, ID ARNG
- 124th Cavalry Regiment, TX ARNG
- 131st Cavalry Regiment, AL ARNG
- 134th Cavalry Regiment Reconnaissance and Surveillance Squadron (1–134 Cavalry R&S)-- formerly 1–167th Cavalry RSTA, 67th Battlefield Surveillance Brigade, Nebraska Army National Guard (NEARNG)
- 152nd Cavalry Regiment, 1st Squadron in 76th Infantry Brigade, 2nd Squadron in 219th Battlefield Surveillance Brigade, IN ARNG
- 153rd Cavalry Regiment, FL ARNG
  - Governor's Guards (Florida) - Troop C, 1st Squadron, 153rd Cavalry Regiment (RSTA)-- dismounted reconnaissance troop
- 158th Cavalry Regiment, MD ARNG
- 163rd Cavalry Regiment, MT ARNG
- 278th Armored Cavalry Regiment, TN ARNG
- 1–297th BFSB, AK ARNG
- 299th Cavalry Regiment, HI ARNG
- 303rd Cavalry Regiment, WA ARNG
- 1/221 Cavalry Squadron, 11th ACR reconnaissance squadron, NV ARNG
- 2nd Squadron, 183rd Cavalry Regiment, 116th IBCT, VA ARNG

== United States Army Chief of Cavalry ==
In 1920, the position of United States Army Chief of Cavalry was created. The Chief of Cavalry was responsible for supervising Army cavalry activities, including personnel management, equipment development and fielding, and creation and implementation of tactics, doctrine, and training. The individuals appointed to serve in this position were:

- Willard Ames Holbrook, 1920–1924
- Malin Craig, 1924–1926
- Herbert B. Crosby, 1926–1930
- Guy V. Henry Jr., 1930–1934
- Leon Kromer, 1934–1938
- John Knowles Herr, 1938–1942

== Heraldry ==
Cavalry in United States military heraldry is represented in a number of ways:

- Branch insignia:
  Two crossed sabers in scabbards, cutting edge up, 11/16-inch in height, of gold color metal. The cavalry insignia was adopted in 1850. Officers and enlisted personnel assigned to cavalry regiments, cavalry squadrons or separate cavalry troops are authorized to wear the cavalry collar insignia in lieu of their insignia of branch when approved by the MACOM commander. Some of the armor and aviation units are designated cavalry units.
- Branch plaque:
  The plaque design has the Cavalry insignia and rim in gold. The background is white and the letters are scarlet.
- Regimental insignia:
  Personnel assigned to cavalry units affiliate with a specific regiment of their branch or cavalry unit and wear the insignia of the affiliated regiment.
- Regimental coat of arms:
  There is no standard cavalry regimental flag to represent all of the cavalry regiments. Each cavalry regiment has its own coat of arms that is displayed on the breast of a displayed eagle. The background of all cavalry regimental flags is yellow, and they have yellow fringes.
- Branch colors:
  Yellow is the Cavalry branch color. In March 1855, two regiments of cavalry were created and their trimmings were to be "yellow". In 1861, the designation of dragoon and mounted rifleman disappeared, all becoming troopers with "yellow" as their colors. Yellow was continued as the color for armor and cavalry units subsequent to disbanding as a branch. Although the regimental flags for cavalry units are yellow, the troop guidons are red and white without an insignia on the guidon.

== Notable U.S. Army cavalrymen ==
- Henry R. Adair
- Henry Tureman Allen
- Creighton Abrams
- Terry de la Mesa Allen Sr.
- Ralph E. Haines, Jr.
- Lucius Banks
- Robert C. Richardson, Jr.
- James M. Bell
- John Bigelow Jr.
- John Buford
- Alfred Moody
- Edgar Rice Burroughs
- Louis H. Carpenter
- Leslie D. Carter
- Samuel P. Carter
- Adna R. Chaffee Jr.
- Adna R. Chaffee
- Harry Chamberlin
- Elijah Churchill
- William Cody
- Lemuel Cook
- Will Cook
- George Armstrong Custer
- Thomas Custer
- William Donovan
- Harry A. "Paddy" Flint
- Charles H. Gerhardt
- George Grunert
- Peter C. Hains III
- Paul D. Harkins
- Hamilton S. Hawkins III
- John Knowles Herr
- Wild Bill Hickok
- Stephen W. Kearny
- William A. Knowlton
- Oscar Koch
- Henry Lee III
- Robert E. Lee
- John P. Lucas
- Ranald Mackenzie
- Halley G. Maddox
- Francis Marion
- Charles A. May
- H.R. McMaster
- Wesley Merritt
- John Montgomery
- Hal Moore
- William Jones Nicholson
- Nicholas M. Nolan
- George S. Patton
- John J. Pershing
- Fay B. Prickett
- Edwin Ramsey
- George Windle Read Jr.
- Ronald Reagan
- Gordon Byrom Rogers
- Theodore Roosevelt
- Charles L. Scott
- Phillip Sheridan
- Luke Short
- William Renwick Smedberg Jr.
- Samuel H. Starr
- James Ewell Brown Stuart
- Lucian Truscott
- Forrest Tucker
- Daniel Van Voorhis
- William Washington
- Charles Willeford

== Historical units ==
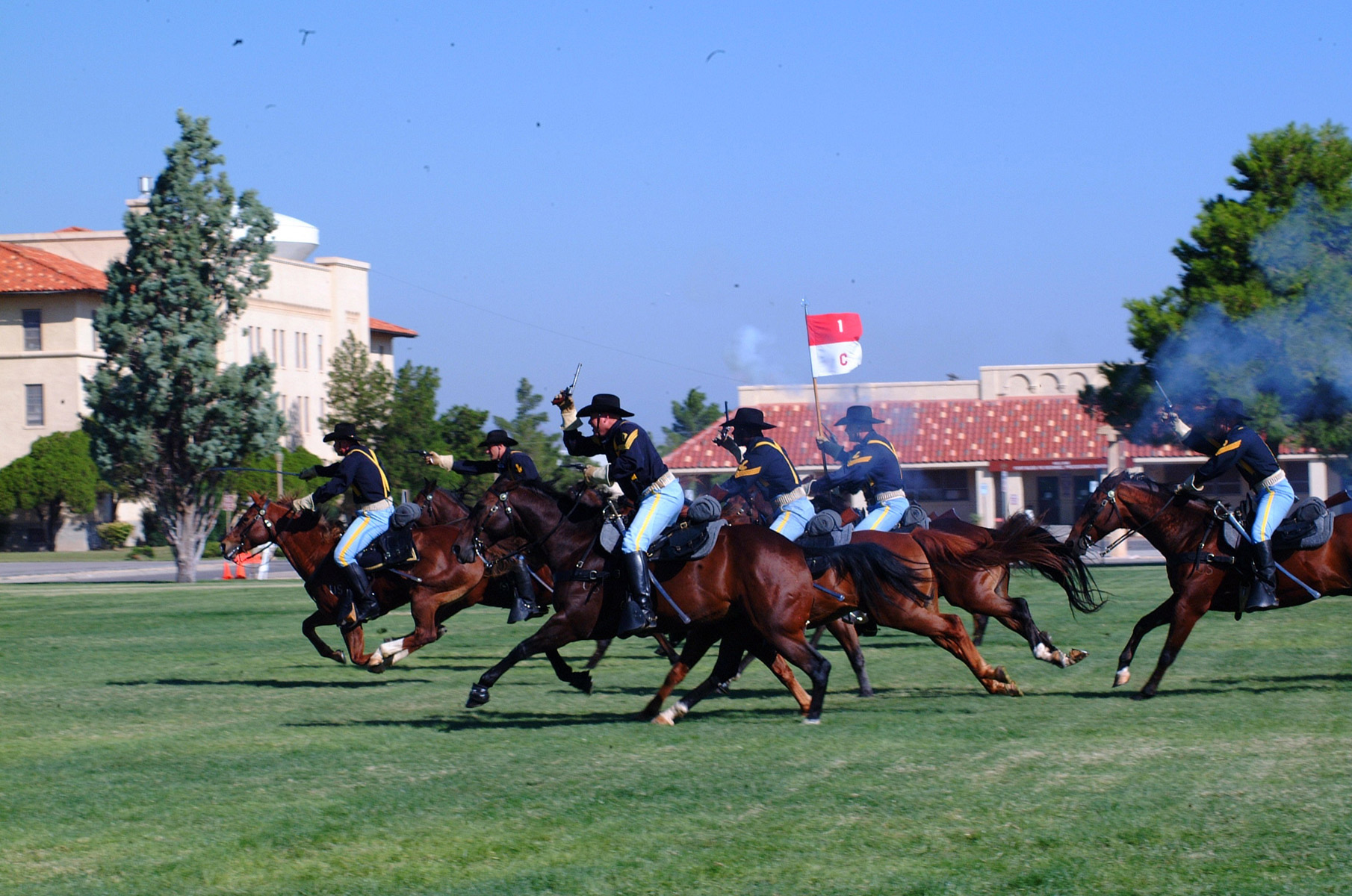
1st Cavalry Division's Horse Cavalry Detachment charge during a ceremony at Fort Bliss, Texas, 2005.

- First Troop Philadelphia City Cavalry also called Philadelphia Light Horse, mustered into federal service. Now Troop A, 1st Squadron, 104th Cavalry Regiment, Pennsylvania Army National Guard. (Founded in 1774.)

Dragoons

- 1st Continental Light Dragoons
- 2nd Continental Light Dragoons also (Sheldon's Horse)
- 3rd Continental Light Dragoons
- 4th Continental Light Dragoons
- Pulaski's Legion (1778–1780)
- Armand's Legion (1778–1783)
- Lee's Legion, also Lee's Partisan Corps
- Ottendorf's Corps

Cavalry

- 106th Cavalry Regiment

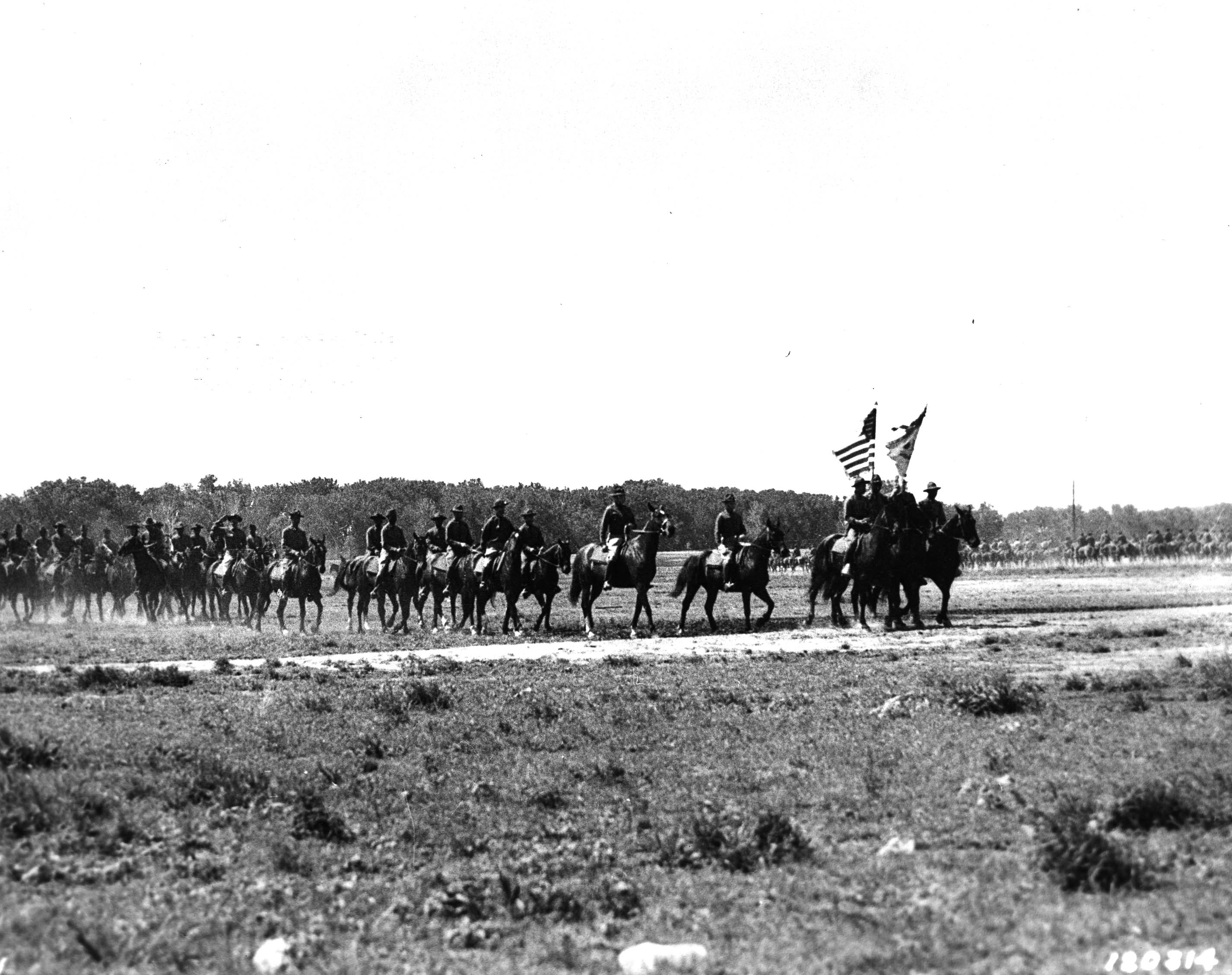
With colors flying and guidons down, the lead troops of the famous 9th Cavalry pass in review at the regiment's new home in rebuilt Camp Funston. Ft. Riley, Kansas 28 May 1941

- 5th Cavalry Brigade HHT (Colored), 2nd Cavalry Division, activated 25 February 1943 and reorganized as 6400th Ordnance Battalion (Ammo) (Provisional) 12 June 1944.
- 31st Cavalry Regiment, deactivated 2005

== See also ==
- United States Army branch insignia
- List of armored and cavalry regiments of the United States Army
- Buffalo Soldier, segregated African American cavalrymen
- U.S. Army Remount Service
- United States Army Cavalry School
