= Battle of Fort Slongo =

1781 battle of the American Revolution

- Part of the American Revolutionary War
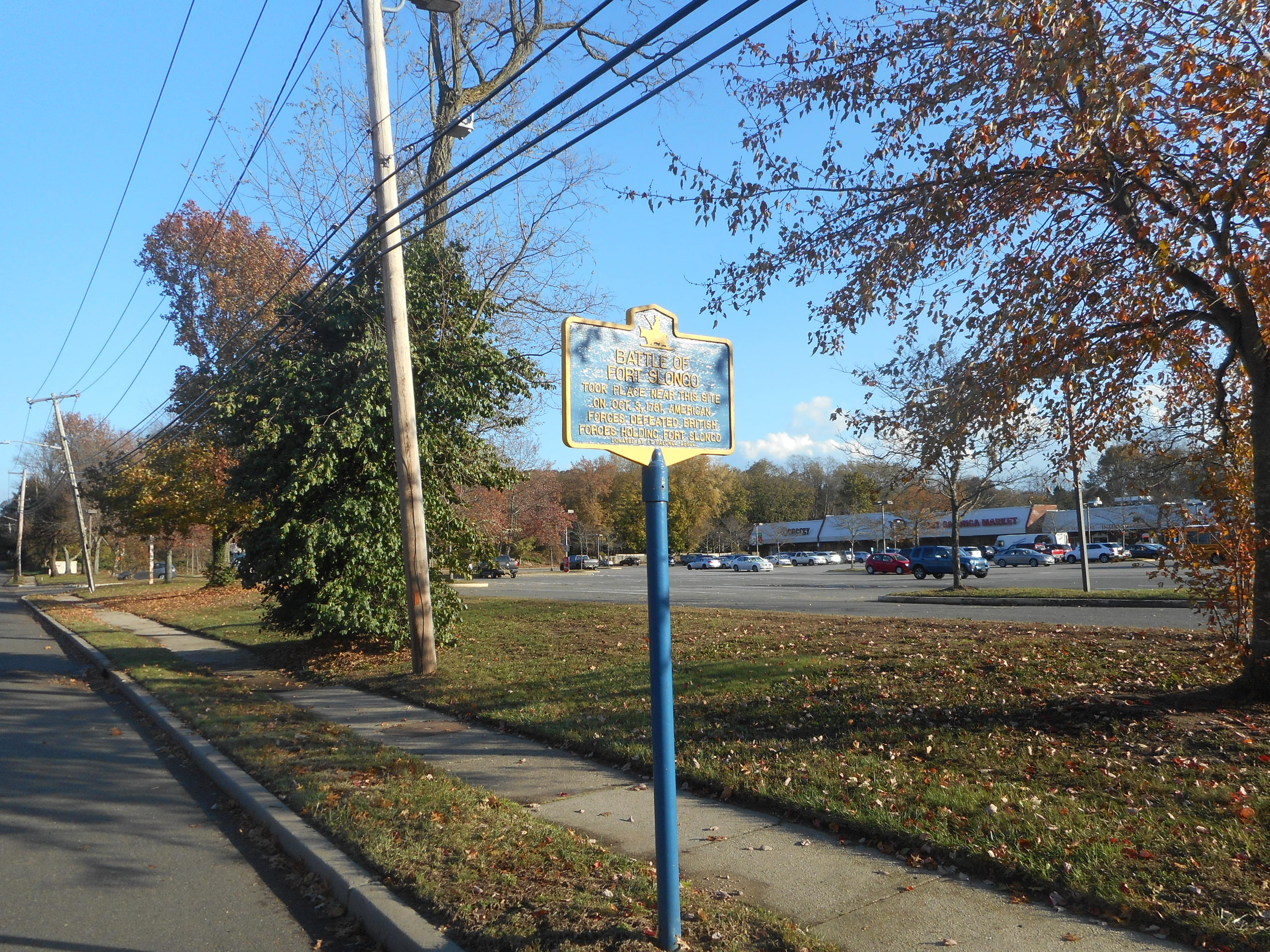
- Historic marker for the Battle of Fort Slongo, along eastbound New York State Route 25A on Smithtown's side of Fort Salonga, New York
Date	October 3, 1781
Location	Fort Salonga, New York
Result	American victory

Belligerents
United States	Great Britain

Commanders and leaders
Benjamin Tallmadge; Lemuel Trescott	

Strength
100 infantry	80–140 infantry

Casualties and losses
1 wounded	4 killed 2 wounded 21 captured

Location of battle within New York and Norwalk, the disembarkation point of the Americans

The Battle of Fort Slongo (also spelled Salonga) was fought on October 3, 1781, between American Continental Army forces, under the command of Benjamin Tallmadge and Lemuel Trescott, and the British defenders of Fort Salonga in the American Revolutionary War. The fort was located near the border of present-day Huntington Township and Smithtown, New York, overlooking Long Island Sound.

== Background ==
The date of construction of Fort Slongo is unknown but it was probably built in 1778 or 1779, when British fort construction on Long Island was at its peak. The fort was a smaller adjunct to the larger Fort Franklin, which was constructed in Lloyd Harbor and built at roughly the same time. The British contracted George Slongo of Philadelphia to construct the fort and it would later bear his name. The fort was built for its strategic location overlooking Long Island Sound.

== Battle ==
On the evening of October 1, an American reconnaissance force commanded by Sgt. Elijah Churchill was sent ahead to plan the attack on the fort. Many of the British officers in command of the fort were at a party the night before the battle. They beached the boats at Crab Meadow, west of the fort, and made their way to the nearby Nathaniel Skidmore farm. From there Nathaniel Skidmore led the group to the fort to scout out their plan of attack. The farm was most likely the farm owned by his father Isaac Skidmore, as Nathaniel would have been no more than 15 years of age and thereby too young to own the farm at Crab Meadow The commanding officer in charge of the fort, Major Valanstine, was in New York City on military matters and was not present for the battle.

On the night of October 2, 100 men under the command of Benjamin Tallmadge and led by Major Lemuel Trescott departed Norwalk, Connecticut in whaleboats across Long Island Sound. Trescott's force was split between 50 men under Captain Richard's Company of the Connecticut Line and 50 men from Captain Edgar's Dismounted Dragoons. Landing in the early morning hours of October 3, Captain Edgar's dragoons were ordered to launch a surprise attack on the fort while Captain Richard's infantry were ordered to surround the fort to prevent any British forces from escaping.

At 3:00 am on October 3, Lieutenant Rogers of the 2nd Regiment of Light Dragoons commenced the attack on the fort with his men, with Major Trescott and Captain Edgar's forces in tow. The British sentry on duty fired his gun to alert the defenders of the American attack and retreated inside the fort, forgetting to shut the gate behind him. Colonel Tallmadge reported in his journal that the British put up some resistance once the Americans entered the fort, with the attackers killing four and wounding two of the defenders.

== Aftermath ==
The Americans burned the buildings and stored materials of the fort, rendering it unusable for the remainder of the war. Among the items destroyed were two four-pounder cannons. The Americans captured two captains, a lieutenant, 18 privates, as well as two one-pounder cannons and a brass one-pounder cannon.

The only American wounded in the battle was Sgt. Elijah Churchill, who would personally be awarded a Badge of Military Merit by George Washington, making him the first person to receive a Purple Heart.

Today the remnants of the fort are in a residential area in the hamlet of Fort Salonga. The actual location is 3250 feet northeast of the historical marker. Historical marker at 40°54′44.73″N by 73°17′59.38″W and fort at 40°55′08.93″N by 73°17′31.94″W. The fort remains are on private property and not accessible without trespass.

== See also ==
- Northern theater of the American Revolutionary War after Saratoga
