= Salonga =

Salonga may refer to:

== Places ==
- Fort Salonga, New York, United States
  - Fort Salonga, an archeological site within the above-mentioned hamlet
- Salonga River, river in the Democratic Republic of the Congo, a tributary of the Busira River
  - Salonga National Park, a national park in the Democratic Republic of the Congo

== People ==
- Gerard Salonga (born 1973), Filipino orchestral conductor, musical arranger and orchestrator
- Jovito Salonga (1920–2016), Filipino nationalist politician and lawyer
- Lea Salonga (born 1971), Filipina singer, actress, producer, and columnist
  - Lea Salonga (album), the eponymous album by the aforementioned singer
- Nicasio Salonga (1924–1951), better known as Asiong Salonga, Filipino gangster also known as the “Manila Kingpin”
- Unique Salonga (born 2000), known mononymously as Unique, Filipino musician
