= Elisha Sheldon =

American colonel

Elisha Sheldon (March 6, 1740 - March 11, 1805) was a Colonel in the American Revolution who served under General George Washington.

Born in Lyme, Connecticut, Sheldon joined the Continental Army at the outbreak of hostilities, and served under the command of General George Washington, who requested that Congress commission Sheldon to raise a cavalry regiment. The 2nd Continental Light Dragoons, which he commanded, came to be known as "Sheldon's Horse", and "served with distinction throughout the Revolutionary War".

Shortly after the end of the war, he moved to Franklin County, Vermont, where he had a grant of land.

He died in Saint Albans, Franklin County, Vermont, and was buried next to his wife, Sarah Bellows. The town of Sheldon, Vermont was named for him, and the Elisha Sheldon House is part of the Litchfield Historic District.

Elisha Sheldon was an original member of the Society of the Cincinnati in the State of Connecticut.
