= Battle of the Flockey =

1777 battle of the American Revolution

- Part of American Revolutionary War
| Date | August 13, 1777 |
| Location | Fultonham, New York 42°33.884′N 74°23.939′W |
| Result | American victory |

Belligerents
| United States | Great Britain |
| | Mohawk |

Commanders and leaders
| Col. John Harper Captain Jean-Louis de Vernejoux | Captain John McDonell Captain George Mann Adam Crysler |

Units involved
| Schoharie militia 2nd Continental Light Dragoons | Loyalist militia Mohawk |

Strength
| 28 dragoons Militia strength unknown | ~73–100 militia and Mohawk |

Casualties and losses
| 2 killed, 1 wounded | Unknown |
- Location within New York

The Battle of the Flockey, fought on August 13, 1777, occurred in Fultonham near present-day Middleburgh in what is now Schoharie County (then Albany County), New York, and was a small part of the Saratoga campaign. It stemmed from a Tory uprising aiming to support British Lieutenant‑Colonel Barry St. Leger's northward advance. Loyalist leaders Captain John McDonell and Adam Crysler—backed by local tavern-owner Captain George Mann - mobilized an estimated 73 - 100 Tory militia and allied Mohawks at Crysler's farm, a low-lying, swampy plain known as "die Flache" (later "Flockey").

It is widely recognized as the site of the first recorded United States Cavalry charge by American forces during the Revolutionary War, executed by the 2nd Continental Light Dragoons (Sheldon's Horse) under Captain Jean‑Louis de Vernejoux on August 13, 1777.

== Background ==
In the summer of 1777, as British General John Burgoyne advanced from Canada towards Albany, his campaign relied upon converging columns. One of these, the western prong, was led by Lieutenant Colonel Barry St. Leger, who advanced east through the Mohawk Valley. His goal was to join forces with Burgoyne near Albany, but his success was dependent upon Loyalist (Tory) support and Native American alliances.

The Schoharie Valley, a fertile and important region west of Albany, was home to both Patriot and Tory sympathizers. In early 1777, Tory leaders including Captain John McDonell, Adam Crysler, and Captain George Mann began organizing a small Tory force of local militia with support from nearby Mohawk allies. Mann, a tavern owner and former Captain of the 15th Albany Militia, had been relieved a year prior due to concerns over his Tory sympathies.

In March 1777, McDonell reportedly traveled to Canada to confer with British officials and promised Tory support for a local uprising. Loyalists began secretly organizing and preparing to rise in coordination with St. Ledger's push through the Mohawk Valley. Their assembly point was Adam Crysler's farm, a low-lying, marshy plain along Foxes Creek known to German-speaking locals as die Flache (later corrupted to "Flockey").

Patriot forces were led by Colonel John Harper of the Schoharie militia who had received intelligence of Tory plans and acted swiftly. Harper elicited support from a 28-man detachment of the 2nd Continental Light Dragoons, under Captain Jean‑Louis de Vernejoux. They first relieved Fort Defiance (Johannes Becker's stone house), then moved south to confront the Loyalists hidden at the Flockey.

== Opposing Forces ==
- Patriot forces: Schoharie militia led by Colonel John Harper with a detachment of 28 men of the 2nd Continental Light Dragoons (also known as Sheldon's Horse) under Captain Jean-Louis de Vernejoux .
- Loyalist forces: Tory militia led by Captains McDonell, Crysler, and Mann, estimated at 73–100 men, with support from Mohawk allies.

== Battle ==
As the dragoons neared, Tory militia opened fire - killing a dragoon and wounding two others. Captain De Vernejoux immediately ordered a cavalry charge, which routed the Loyalists; many fled into the woods rather than stand and fight. No further pursuit occurred due to darkness and the muddy terrain. Patriot casualties totaled two killed (Lt. David Wirt was killed during the engagement, another soldier was mortally wounded and died three days later) and one wounded. Tory losses remain unspecified in official records, though several may have been wounded or dispersed; no contemporary Loyalist casualty roll survives.

== Casualties ==
- Patriot: 2 killed, 1 wounded.
- Loyalist: Unknown, no official casualty record survives

== Significance ==
The Battle of the Flockey was a small but notable victory for American Patriot forces during the Revolutionary War. It marked the first recorded use of a cavalry charge by the Americans during the war. The engagement, while strategically insignificant, helped suppress Loyalist support and activity in the Schoharie Valley.

== Aftermath ==
Following the battle, control of the Schoharie Valley was cemented in American hands, though it would continue to see sporadic Loyalist raids through the end of the war.

Loyalist leader George Mann went into hiding but surrendered in December 1777. He was imprisoned in Albany until the end of the war, after which he was released as he had not committed any serious offenses.

== See also ==
- Saratoga Campaign
- Lieutenant‑Colonel Barry St. Leger
- The Mohawk People
- 2nd Continental Light Dragoons
