= Fort Salonga =

- U.S. National Register of Historic Places
- Nearest city: Fort Salonga, New York
- Area: 0.2 acres (0.081 ha)
- Built: 1776
- NRHP reference No.: 82003406
- Added to NRHP: May 21, 1982

Fort Salonga, also known as NYSDHP Unique Site No. A103-08-0036, is an archaeological site in the vicinity of Fort Salonga, New York that was listed on the National Register of Historic Places in 1982.

It is the site of the Revolutionary War British Fort Salonga, or Fort Slongo, (named after one of the fort's architects – George Slongo) once located near the border of Huntington Township and The Town of Smithtown, overlooking the Long Island Sound.

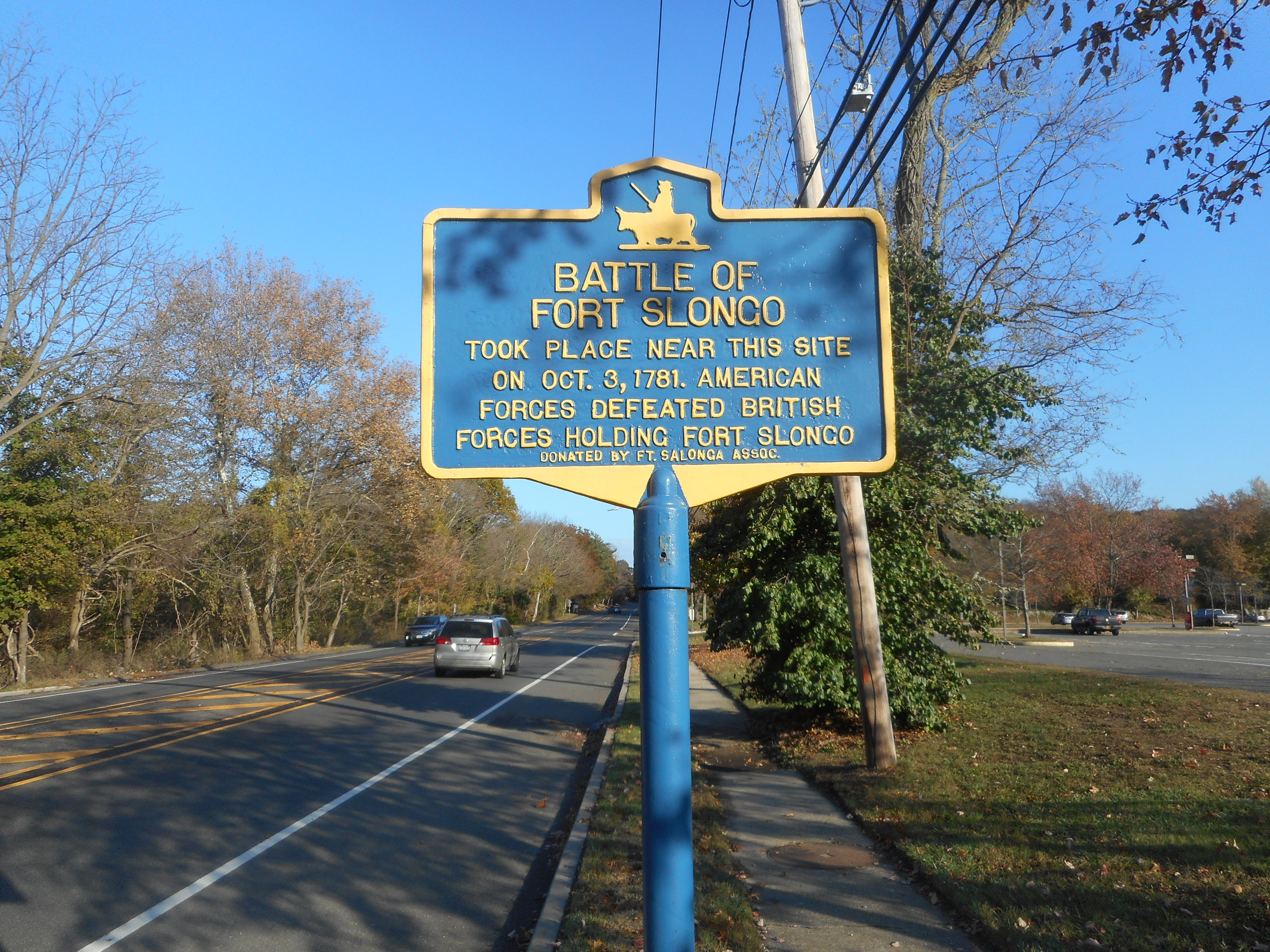
A historic plaque near the site

In an October 1781 skirmish between the British and Americans at the fort, Elijah Churchill, a soldier for the Continental Army, was wounded. He personally received a Badge of Military Merit from George Washington for his actions. The Badge became the Purple Heart and he is credited with being the first to receive the award.
