= Thomas Scott Williams =

American judge

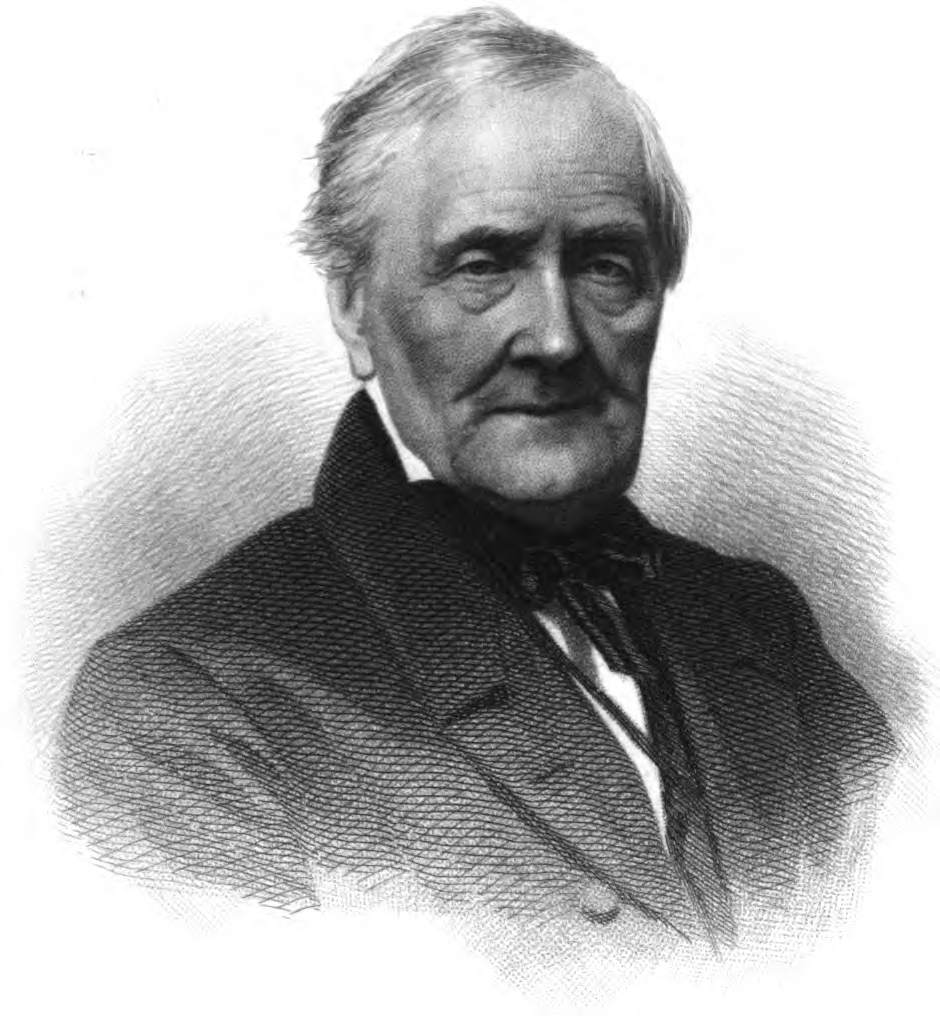
- Portrait, 1863

Member of the U.S. House of Representatives from Connecticut's at-large district
- In office March 4, 1817 – March 3, 1819
- Preceded by: Benjamin Tallmadge
- Succeeded by: Gideon Tomlinson

Personal details
- Born: June 26, 1777 Wethersfield, Connecticut, U.S.
- Died: December 15, 1861 (aged 84) Hartford, Connecticut, U.S.
- Spouse: Delia Ellsworth (m. 1812)
- Education: Yale College

Thomas Scott Williams (June 26, 1777 – December 15, 1861) was a U.S. Representative from Connecticut.

Born in Wethersfield, Connecticut, Williams completed preparatory studies. He graduated from Yale College in 1794. He next studied law. He was admitted to the bar in 1799 and commenced practice in Mansfield, Connecticut. He moved to Hartford, Connecticut, in 1803. He was appointed attorney of the board of managers of the school fund of Hartford 1809–1810. He served in the State house of representatives in 1813, 1815, and 1816. He served as clerk of the house in 1815 and 1816.

Williams was elected as a Federalist to the Fifteenth Congress (March 4, 1817 – March 3, 1819). He was again a member of the State house of representatives in 1819, 1825, and 1827–1829. He was appointed in 1829 an associate judge of the supreme court of errors and of the superior court, and in May 1834 appointed chief justice, holding the position until his resignation in May 1847. He served as mayor of Hartford 1831–1835. He served as Vice President of the American Board of Commissioners for Foreign Missions in 1843. He resigned from public office. He served as president of the American Tract Society of New York from May 1848 until his death. He died in Hartford, Connecticut, December 15, 1861. Williams married in 1812 Delia Ellsworth, daughter of Founding Father Oliver Ellsworth of Windsor, Connecticut. Williams was interred in Old North Cemetery near his brother-in-law William W. Ellsworth.

U.S. House of Representatives
| Preceded by Benjamin Tallmadge | Member of the U.S. House of Representatives from Connecticut's at-large congressional district 1817–1819 | Succeeded by Gideon Tomlinson |
