= Five-eighth =

Half back position in rugby league

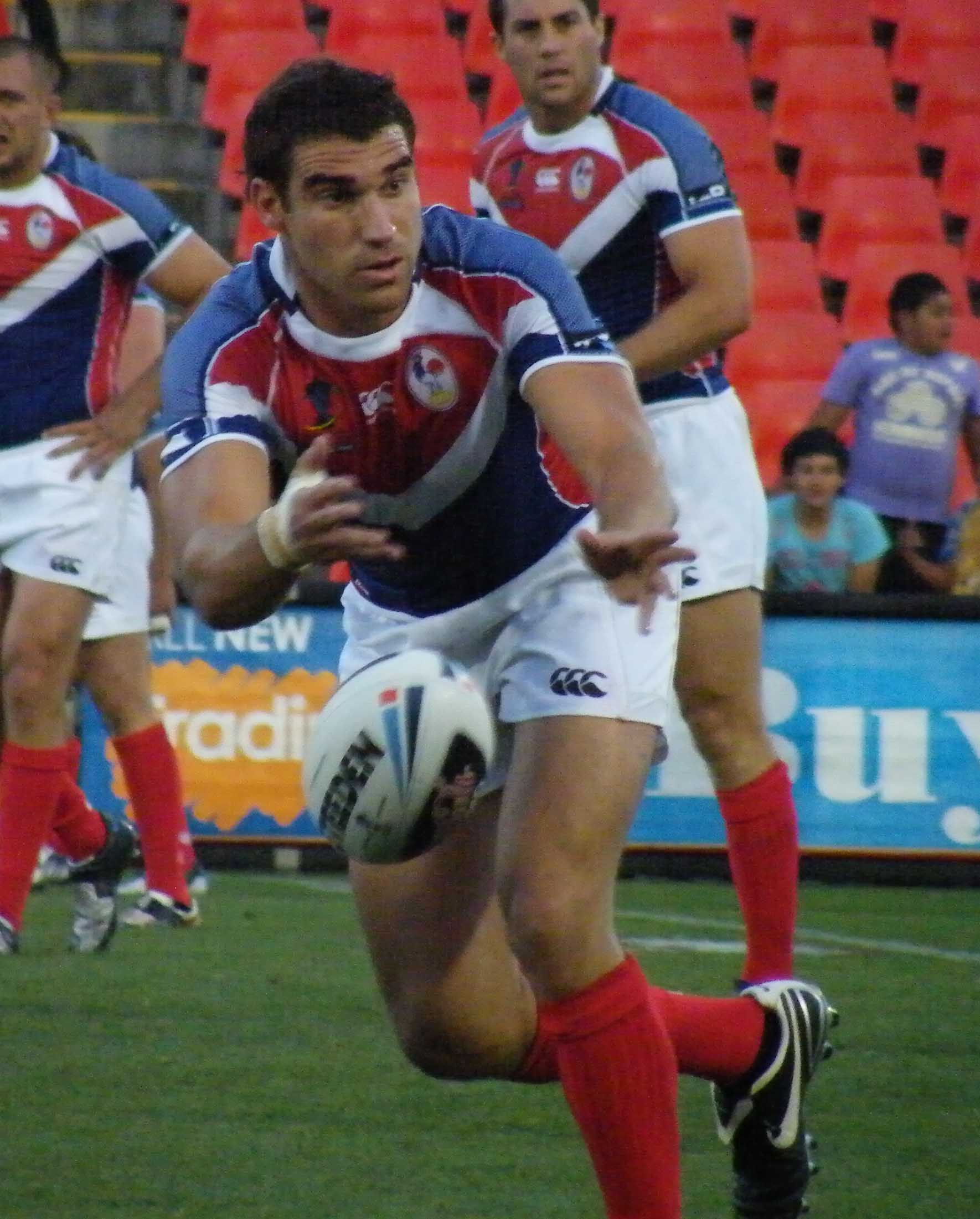
Stand-offs such as France's Thomas Bosc require good passing skills.

Five-eighth or stand-off is one of the positions in a rugby league football team. Wearing jersey number 6, this player is one of the two half-backs in a team, partnering the scrum-half. As the name suggests (5/8 being between 1/2 and 3/4), the five-eighth plays between the half-back and the threequarters - the centres and wingers - moving the ball from the contested middle to the outside backs. In a traditional 'back-line' attack (No. 1–7), the five-eighth, sometimes known as the pivot or second receiver, receives the ball from the half-back, who is the first receiver of the ball from the dummy-half or hooker following a tackle.

The role of the five-eighth is often to pass the ball away from the congested area around the tackle, further out along the 'back-line' to the outside backs (the centres and wingers) who have more space to run with. Furthermore, players in this position typically assume responsibility for kicking the ball for field position in general play. The five-eighth is therefore considered one of the most important positions, often referred to as a 'play maker', assuming a decision-making role on the field. Over time, however, as the game has evolved, the roles of the two halves have grown more aligned and difficult to distinguish. Along with other key positions – fullback, hooker and half-back – the five-eighth makes up what is known as a team's spine.

One book published in 1996 stated that in senior rugby league, the five-eighth and hooker handled the ball more often than any other positions.

The Rugby League International Federation's Laws of the Game state that the "Stand-off half or Five-eighth" is to be numbered 6. However, traditionally players' jersey numbers have varied, and in the modern Super League, each squad's players are assigned individual numbers regardless of position.

== Etymology ==
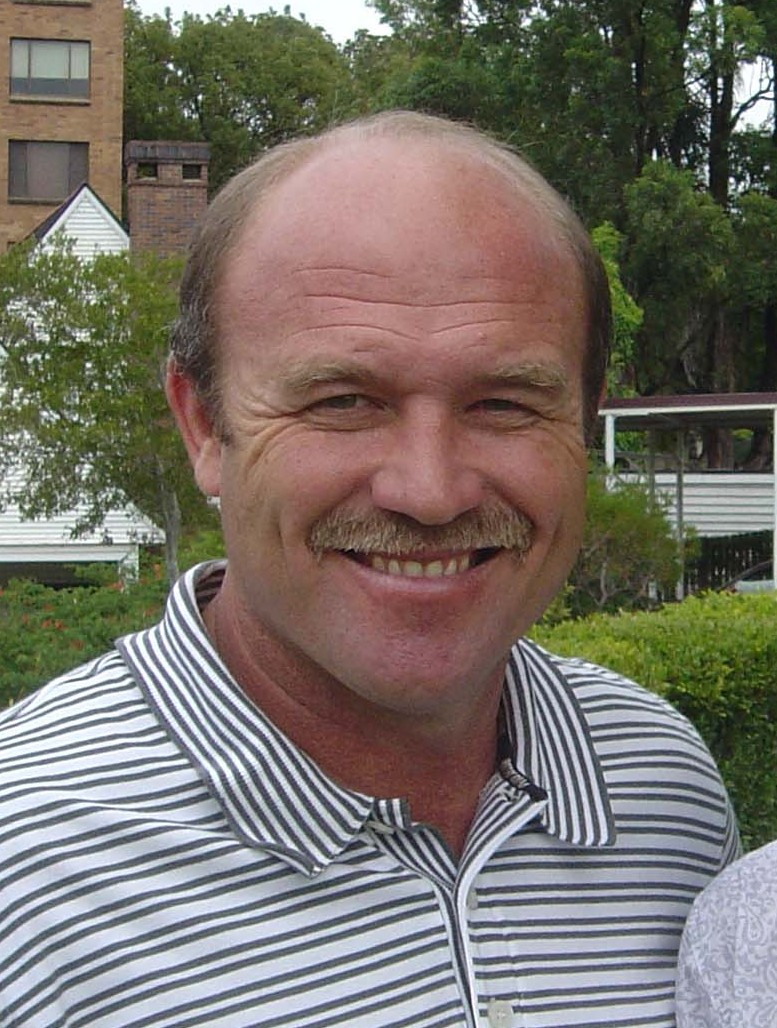
Wally Lewis was voted Australia's greatest ever five-eighth in 2008.

Traditionally in rugby football, there have always been two half-backs as well as scrums involving the forwards. Of the two half-backs, the name "scrum half" was given to the one who was involved in the scrum by feeding the ball into it; and the name "stand-off half" was given to the one who stood off to the side of the scrum. In Britain, where rugby league originated, this terminology has been retained. In Australian English, however, "five-eighth" is the term used for the number 6, to differentiate from the "half-back" which is the name commonly given to the number 7. In New Zealand, both terms appear to be used interchangeably.

== Notable Five-eighths ==
Five-eighths that feature in their respective nations' rugby league halls of fame are England's Roger Millward, Australia's Wally Lewis, Bob Fulton, Brett Kenny, Albert Rosenfeld and Vic Hey, and New Zealand's George Menzies.

Rugby league's first known black player, Lucius Banks, played in the position for Hunslet R.L.F.C. in 1912–13.

== See also ==
- Rugby league positions
- Rugby league gameplay
