= Battle of Fort St. George =

1780 battle of the American Revolutionary War

Coordinates: 40°45′21.9″N 72°52′50.9″W

- Part of the American Revolutionary War
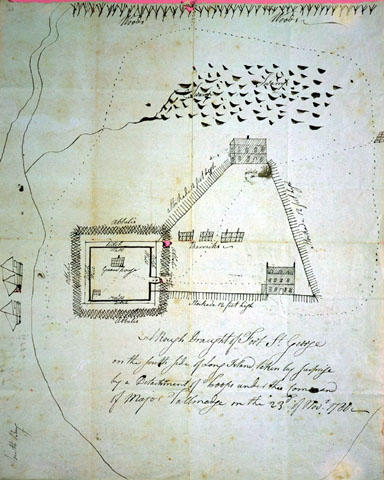
- Sketch by Benjamin Tallmadge of Fort St. George
Date	November 23, 1780
Location	present-day Shirley, New York
Result	American victory

Belligerents
United States	Great Britain

Commanders and leaders
Benjamin Tallmadge	

Strength
80	61

Casualties and losses
1 wounded	7 killed 54 captured Numerous non-combatants also captured

The Battle of Fort St. George (or Fort George) was the culmination of a Continental Army raiding expedition led by Benjamin Tallmadge against a fortified Loyalist outpost and storage depot at the Manor St. George on the south coast of Long Island on November 23, 1780, during the American Revolutionary War. Tallmadge's raid was successful; the garrison was surprised, and many provisions and prisoners were taken.

== Raid ==
Loyalist refugees from Rhode Island were resettled onto Long Island after the British withdrew their forces from Newport, Rhode Island in 1779. Some of these were established at Manor St. George on the southeastern part of the island (in present-day Shirley, New York). They fortified the property, erecting a stockade 12 feet (3.7 m) high in a roughly triangular shape around the manor house. The stockade was lined with abatis (tree branches with sharpened points facing out) and a deep ditch.

Major Benjamin Tallmadge led a force of about 80 men (drawn from his 2nd Continental Light Dragoons) that crossed Long Island Sound in whaleboats from Fairfield, Connecticut on November 21, 1780, landing at present-day Mt. Sinai. Leaving a guard of 20 men with the boats, the remaining men began to march across Long Island that evening, but bad weather forced them to return to the boats. After the weather improved, Tallmadge again set out on the evening of the 22nd, arriving near the property before dawn on the 23rd.

Ordering his men to leave their muskets unloaded and with bayonets fixed, Tallmadge divided his force into three, with each unit to attack one of the stockade's sides. Tallmadge's party was not spotted in the early dawn light until it was within 40 yards (37 m) of the stockade, and a sentry fired his weapon to raise the alarm. At this point Tallmadge's men rushed the stockade. Tallmadge's unit cut its way through the stockade while the other two units scaled the wall. According to Tallmadge's report the surprise was sufficient: the main house was surrounded and surrendered "in less than ten minutes". However, some of the Loyalist garrison managed to reach a fortified house that formed part of the stockade. These men surrendered after a brief firefight.

== Aftermath ==
Tallmadge's force destroyed stores and took captive not just the armed defenders but a number of non-combatants as well. These were then marched across the island, and taken on Tallmadge's boats across to Fairfield. Tallmadge reported that only one of his men was wounded. Of the enemy he claimed that seven were killed and 54 wounded.

Participating in the battle was Sgt. Elijah Churchill who would be awarded the first Badge of Military Merit, predecessor to the Purple Heart.

The route Tallmadge used to cross the island is now known as the Tallmadge Trail. The Smith Estate and its 127 acres (51 ha) grounds are now a museum and public park operated by the township of Brookhaven.

== Popular culture ==
This battle is depicted in season 4, episode 1 of the Revolutionary War spy thriller series, AMC's Turn: Washington's Spies.

== See also ==
- List of American Revolutionary War battles
