= Lucius Banks =

American gridiron and rugby league footballer

Personal information
- Full name: Lucius Banks, Jr.
- Born: May 1, 1886 Harmony Village, Virginia, U.S.
- Died: February 1955 (aged 68) Boston, Massachusetts, U.S.

Playing information
Club
Years	Team	Pld	T	G	FG	P
1912	Hunslet	13	5	0	0	15

Lucius Banks, Jr. (May 1, 1886 – February 6, 1955) was an American professional rugby league player who played in the 1910s. He played in England for Hunslet in Hunslet, Leeds, in 1912 and, is thought to be the first black athlete to compete in rugby league; the first American to play rugby league; and, according to the historian Tony Collins, "probably only the fourth black American to play professional football of any code".

== Biography ==
=== Early life ===
Banks was born in Virginia in either 1885 or 1886 to Lucius Banks Sr. and Julia Webb Banks. The family moved to Arlington, Massachusetts when he was still young.

Banks served in the U.S. cavalry, recorded as a private in 1910 in the Army and Navy Register. He was stationed at West Point, New York from 1908 to 1912, where he excelled in both cricket and American football.

=== Playing career ===
Banks was spotted playing as a quarterback in New York by a one-time member of Hunslet's management committee, and the club bought him out of the army and brought him to the UK, apparently partly because the club thought an exotic player would boost revenue. The strategy seems to have worked, as 'his presence significantly swelled the attendance at his first game'.

Local news reporting on Banks's first game in England included some prominent racist coverage, with a local evening paper running the headline 'Hunslet's Coloured Coon' and the Yorkshire Post suggesting that local players should have been hired instead and commenting that "if the club wanted to sign 'coloured' players they should go to South Africa, where there are reputed to be capable goal kickers with bare feet".

Banks's performance seems to have been fairly successful: playing on the wing, he scored four tries during his first four games for the club, the first of which was on January 27, 1912, against York. He later moved to playing as stand-off, before returning to America following his last game with the club, on December 26, 1912.

More recently, Banks has been described as a black rugby league player within the history of the sport.

=== Later life ===
Following his days in England, Banks served in World War I and saw active service in France. In 1919, he joined the Boston Police Department and worked as a police officer for 27 years. He was also a member of the Prince Hall Free & Accepted Masonic Lodge. He died in 1955 (when his age was listed as 68) and was survived by his wife, Maude, and son, Richard L. Banks.
