= Lemuel Cook =

American Revolutionary War veteran

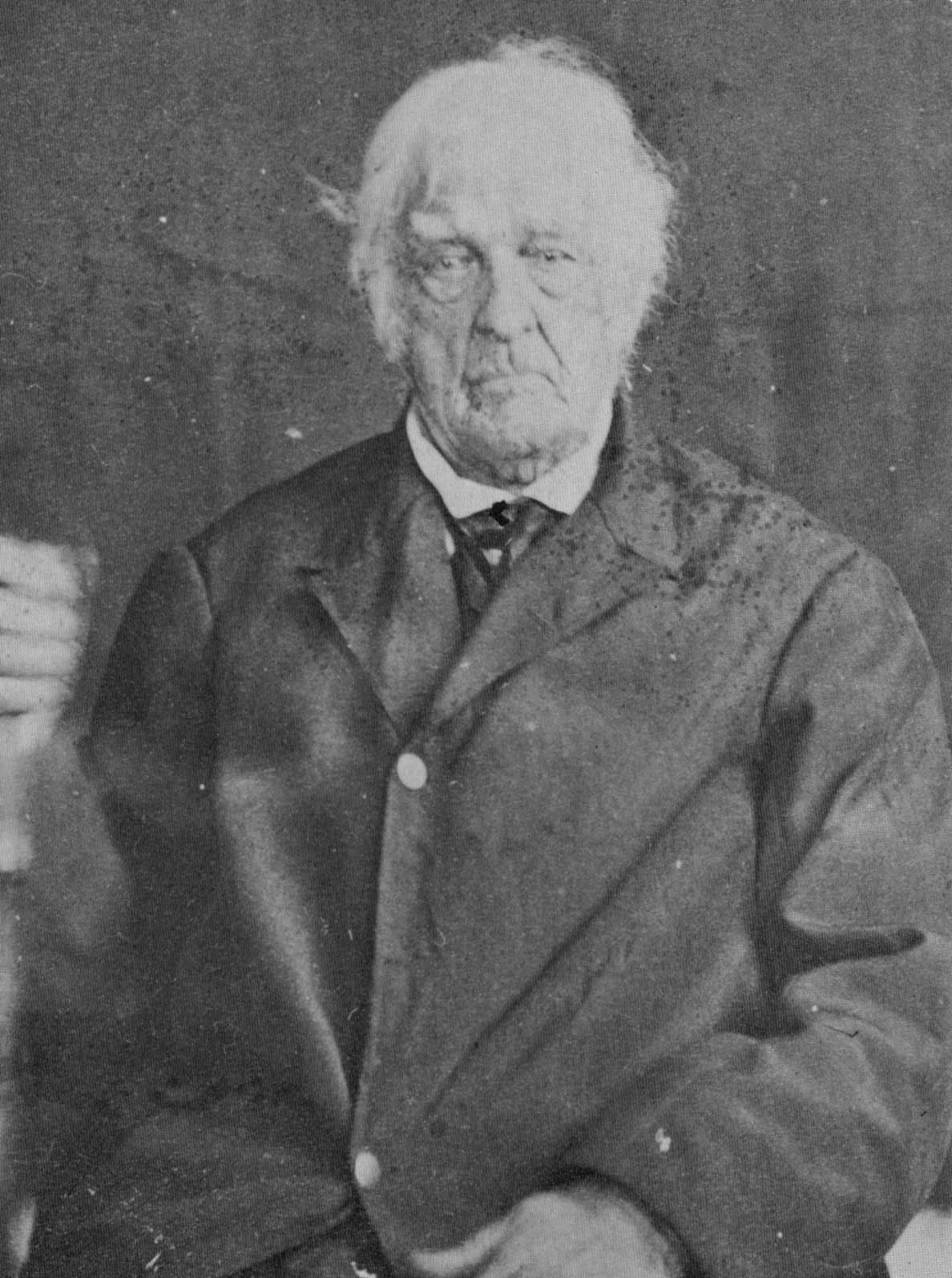
- Cook c. 1864
- Born: September 10, 1759; Litchfield County, Colony of Connecticut, British America
- Died: May 20, 1866 (aged 106); Clarendon, New York, U.S.
- Spouse: Hannah Curtis
- Children: 10
- Military career
- Allegiance: United States
- Branch: Continental Army; U.S. Army
- Service years: 1775–1784
- Rank: Private
- Units: 2nd Continental Light Dragoons
- Conflicts: American Revolutionary War; Battle of Valentine's Hill; Battle of Brandywine; Siege of Yorktown
- Other work: Farmer

Lemuel Cook (September 10, 1759 – May 20, 1866) was an American Continental Army soldier and one of the last verified surviving veterans of the American Revolutionary War. He served in the 2nd Continental Light Dragoons during the war and later lived in Clarendon, New York, where he died in 1866.

Cook was born in Litchfield County, Connecticut, in 1759 and served as a private in the Continental Army. His wartime service included participation in the Battle of Brandywine and the Siege of Yorktown. He was also a recipient of a military pension for his Revolutionary War service.

== Early life and education ==
Cook was born on September 10, 1759, in Litchfield County, Connecticut, to Henry Cook and his wife, Hannah Benham.

== Military service ==
Cook enlisted in the Continental Army in 1775 at the age of 16. He was assigned to the 2nd Continental Light Dragoons, and by his death he was the last surviving member. He fought at Brandywine and in the Virginian campaign, and was wounded several times. He was present at Charles Cornwallis' surrender in October 1781. He received an honorable discharge signed by George Washington on June 12, 1784.

== Later life and death ==
Following the war, Cook became a farmer and married Hannah Curtis. They had seven sons and three daughters.

He was an active Mason and Democrat since the party’s establishment in 1828. His church was Congregational. He lived in Plymouth, Connecticut (then Northbury) until 1790, when he moved to Clinton, New York. In 1795 he returned to Plymouth, then moved to Pompey, New York in 1805. He moved to North Bergen, New York in 1821 and finally to Clarendon, New York in 1832.

Lemuel was one of the oldest and among the last living pensioners of the American Revolution. He died May 20, 1866, at the age of 106, having lived to see the start and the end of the American Civil War. He was buried with full military and Masonic honors. At the time of his death, only three other revolutionary veterans (Samuel Downing, Daniel F. Bakeman and John Gray) were still alive.

== Photography ==
He was one of seven American Revolutionary War veterans who, having survived into the age of photography, were featured in the 1864 book The Last Men of the Revolution, which gives many details of his life.

== See also ==
- Last surviving United States war veterans
