= 2nd Continental Light Dragoons =

2nd Continental Light Dragoons 2nd Legionary Corps
- Active: 1776–1783; reestablished 1978 by State of Connecticut
- Country: United States
- Allegiance: (United States) Continental Congress; Connecticut
- Type: Dragoon
- Size: Regiment of six troops 120 men in 1780
- Part of: Continental Army
- Nickname: Sheldon's Horse
- Colors: Blue coat with buff facings
- Engagements: Battle of Brandywine, Battle of Germantown, Battle of Yorktown

Commanders
- Notable commanders: Elisha Sheldon; Benjamin Tallmadge

The 2nd Continental Light Dragoons, also known as Sheldon's Horse after Colonel Elisha Sheldon, was commissioned by the Continental Congress on 12 December 1776, and was first mustered at Wethersfield, Connecticut, in March 1777 for service with the Continental Army. The regiment consisted of four troops from Connecticut, one troop each largely from Massachusetts and New Jersey, and two companies of light infantry.

== Military action ==
The national color of the Second Continental Light Dragoons.

The regiment saw action at the Battle of Woodbridge, Battle of Brandywine, Battle of Kingston, Battle of Schoharie, Battle of the Flockey (site of the first cavalry charge on American soil), Battle of Paoli, Battle of Whitemarsh, Battle of Morrisania, Battle of Saratoga, Battle of Germantown, and the Battle of Yorktown. The unit almost never served as a whole. Usually individual troops were assigned as necessary. The regiment performed numerous raids from whaleboats against British and Loyalist targets on Long Island. Some of the successful raids captured Fort St. George, Fort Slongo and Lloyd's Neck, Long Island.

Elements from the unit comprised George Washington's personal bodyguard. In 1778, when Loyalist agents and British forces shadowed Washington for weeks with the intention of kidnapping him, they had to abandon the operation because, according to British intelligence dispatches, "The 2nd Dragoons are (always) with him." The 2nd Dragoons also guarded British Major John André during his incarceration, trial and subsequent execution in Nyack, New York.

The regiment's main patrol areas during the war were in Southern Connecticut and New York, where they intercepted British supplies and fought off bands of Loyalist partisans who preyed on local citizens. This duty earned them the nickname "Watchdogs of the Highlands". They also earned the sobriquet "Washington's Eyes", likely because of their spy work. Major Benjamin Tallmadge became a spy master who ran one of the most successful spy rings of the war, able to infiltrate the British military command in New York city.

== After the war ==
On 1 January 1781, the regiment was reorganized by the dismounting of two of its six troops and re-designated the 2nd Legionary Corps. The regiment was furloughed 9 June 1783, at Newburgh, New York and discharged on 20 November 1783, by proclamation of General Washington.

The 2nd Light Dragoons are prominent in Colonel John Trumbull's paintings of the American Revolution.

== Notes ==
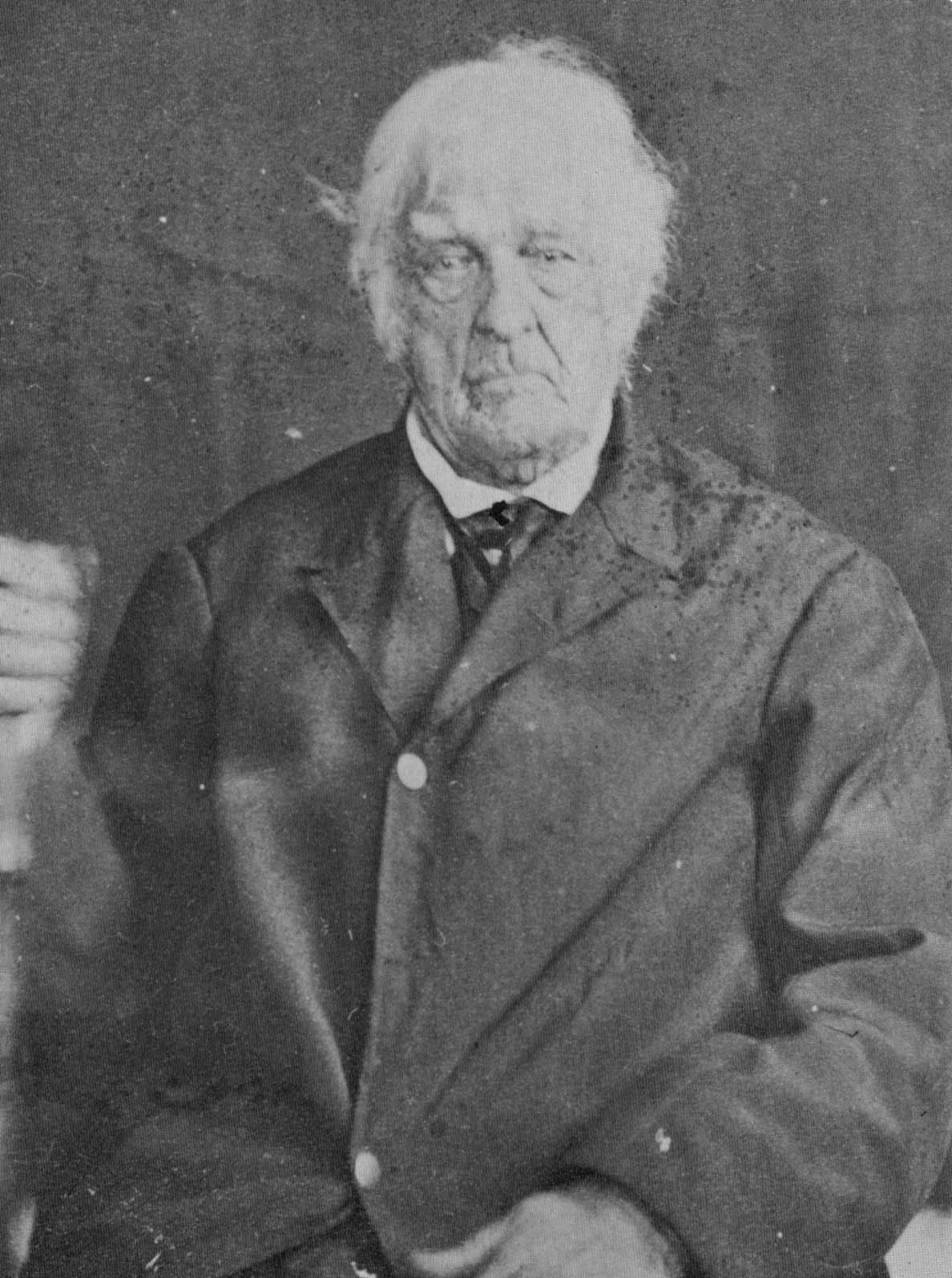
Lemuel Cook.

- The regimental national colors of the 2nd was taken by Banastre Tarleton in 1779; on 14 June 2006, it was sold at auction.
- Sgt. Elijah Churchill was awarded the Badge of Military Merit.
- The last surviving member of the 2nd Dragoons was Lemuel Cook (1759–1866).
