= Benjamin Tallmadge =

18th-century American military officer (1754–1835)

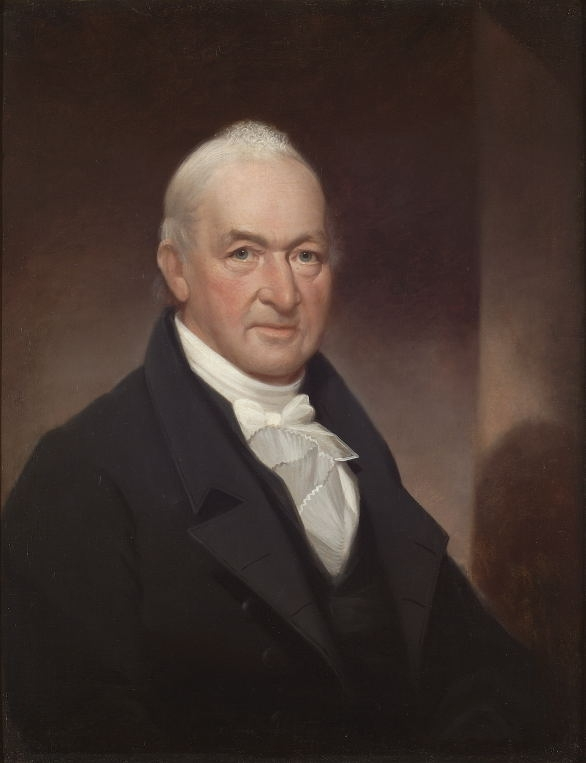
- Tallmadge c. 1825

Member of the U.S. House of Representatives from Connecticut's at-large district
- In office March 4, 1801 – March 3, 1817
- Preceded by: William Edmond
- Succeeded by: Thomas Scott Williams

Personal details
- Born: February 25, 1754 Setauket or Brookhaven, Province of New York
- Died: March 7, 1835 (aged 81) Litchfield, Connecticut, U.S.
- Spouses: Mary Floyd (m. 1784; died 1805) Maria Hallett (m. 1808)
- Children: 7, including Frederick A. Tallmadge
- Education: Yale College
- Occupation: Statesman
- Known for: Organized the Culper Spy Ring
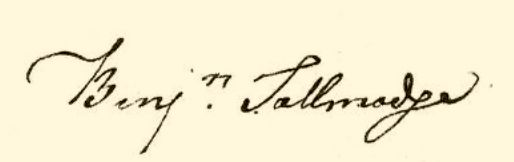
- Signature
- Nickname: John Bolton

Military service
- Allegiance: United States
- Branch/service: 2nd Continental Light Dragoons
- Years of service: 1776–1783
- Rank: Captain; Major (Brevet Lieutenant Colonel post-war)
- Battles/wars: American Revolutionary War; Battle of Trenton; Battle of Monmouth; Battle of Stony Point; Battle of Fort St. George; Siege of Yorktown

Benjamin Tallmadge (February 25, 1754 – March 7, 1835) was an American military officer, spymaster, and politician. He is best known for his service as an officer in the Continental Army during the American Revolutionary War. He acted as leader of the Culper Ring during the war, a celebrated network of spies in New York where major British forces were based. He also led a successful raid across Long Island that culminated in the Battle of Fort St. George. After the war, Tallmadge was elected to the US House of Representatives as a member of the Federalist Party.

== Early life ==
Tallmadge was born February 25, 1754, the son of Susannah Smith and Rev. Benjamin Tallmadge Sr., a clergyman in Setauket, New York, a hamlet of the Town of Brookhaven, New York, on Long Island. He graduated from Yale in 1773, where he was a member of Brothers in Unity and was a classmate and close friend of the American Revolutionary War spy Nathan Hale. He also served as superintendent of Wethersfield High School from 1773 to 1776.

== American Revolutionary War ==
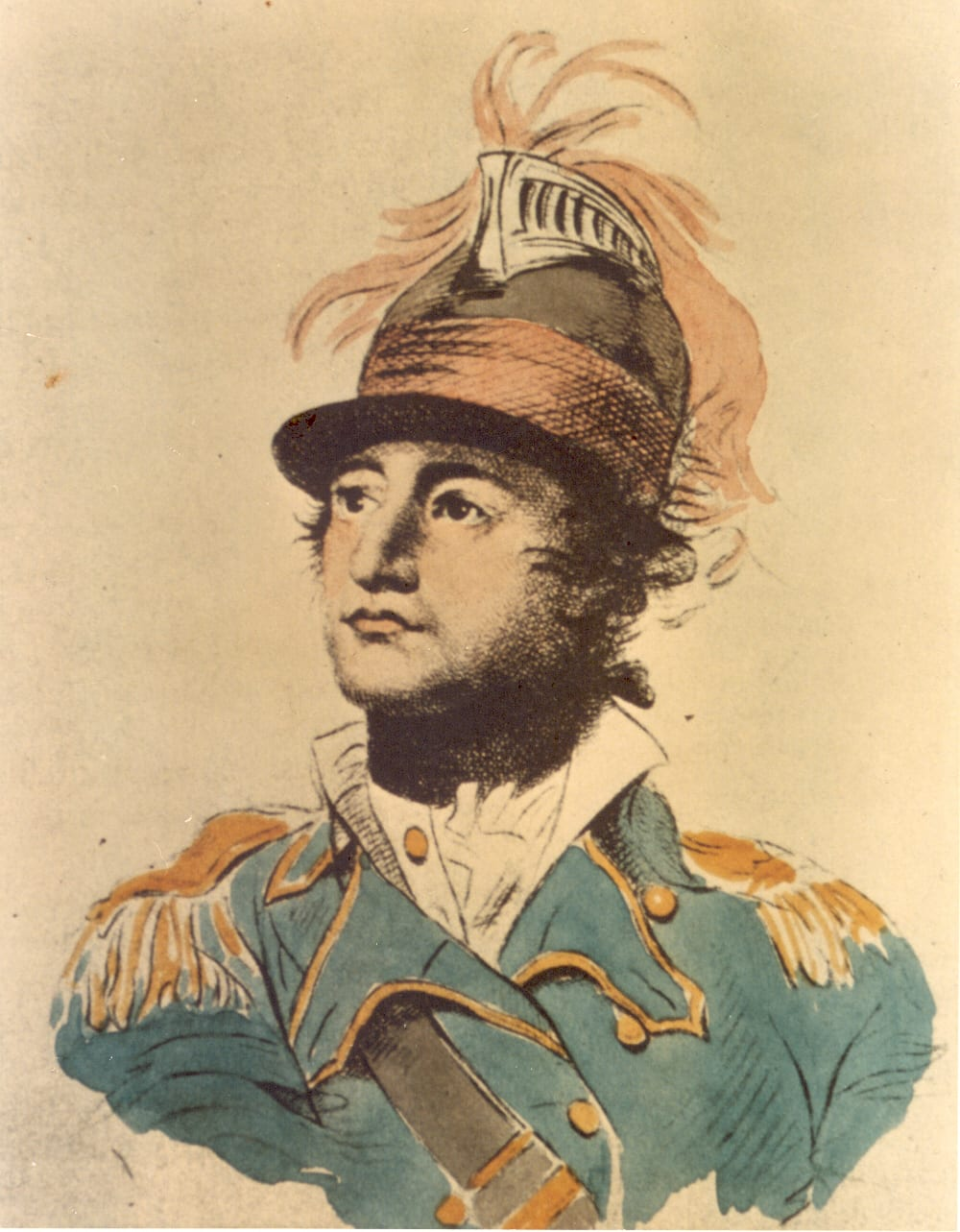
Major Tallmadge of the 2nd Continental Dragoons.

Tallmadge was a major in the 2nd Continental Light Dragoons and was initially commissioned on June 20, 1776. He was given the position of director of military intelligence by George Washington after Nathaniel Sackett was relieved of his duties because he did not gain any ground from the enemy. Tallmadge was in charge of bringing intelligence from British-controlled New York to the Continental army, and he did so by assembling a network of spies known as the Culper Ring, with the help of Abraham Woodhull and Robert Townsend.

The Culper Ring was involved in revealing the betrayal of Major General Benedict Arnold. Arnold's British contact, Major John André, was caught and taken to North Castle, where the commander, Colonel John Jameson, ordered Lieutenant Solomon Allen to take the incriminating documents found with André to Arnold, who was still in command at West Point. Tallmadge suspected André of being a spy and Arnold of being his accomplice, and tried to have Jameson reverse his orders. He was unsuccessful, but did convince Jameson to send a rider and take André to Salem, eight miles east of the Hudson River, and to send the documents to Washington. Allen still reported to Arnold with Jameson's note outlining the events. Later, Jameson was chastised by Washington for warning Arnold and allowing his escape. André was placed in Tallmadge's custody, awaiting execution.

On November 21, 1780, Tallmadge and his dragoons rowed across Long Island Sound from Fairfield, Connecticut to Cedar Beach in Mount Sinai, New York. The next day, they proceeded to the south shore, where they captured and burned down Manor St. George. On their march back to Mt. Sinai, Tallmadge stopped in Coram, New York and ordered the burning of 300 tons of hay which the British had been stockpiling for the winter. Washington, on hearing the news, sent the following letter to Tallmadge:

I have received with much pleasure the report of your successful enterprise upon Fort St. George, and was pleased with the destruction of the hay at Coram, which must be severely felt by the enemy at this time. I beg you to accept my thanks for your spirited execution of this business.

Tallmadge served at Washington's headquarters from March 1781 until the Continental Army was disbanded in November 1783. He was admitted as an original member of The Society of the Cincinnati in the state of Connecticut when it was established in July 1783 and brevetted to the rank of lieutenant colonel on September 30, 1783. He subsequently served as Assistant Treasurer (1785–1789), Treasurer (1789–1793), Vice President (1793–1796) and President (1796–1801) of the Society of the Cincinnati in the state of Connecticut and continues to be represented by a living descendant in the society today.

== Later life ==
=== Career ===
In 1792, Tallmadge was appointed postmaster of Litchfield, Connecticut. He served until he resigned to assume his seat in Congress. He established a successful mercantile and importing business and was the first president of the Phoenix Branch Bank, a position he held from 1814 to 1826.

=== House of Representatives ===
On March 4, 1801, Tallmadge succeeded William Edmond as a Federalist Party member of the US House of Representatives to represent Connecticut's at-large congressional district, his second bid for this seat after an initial run in 1798, where he finished 10th (with the top 7 candidates winning). He served until March 3, 1817, when he was succeeded by Thomas Scott Williams.

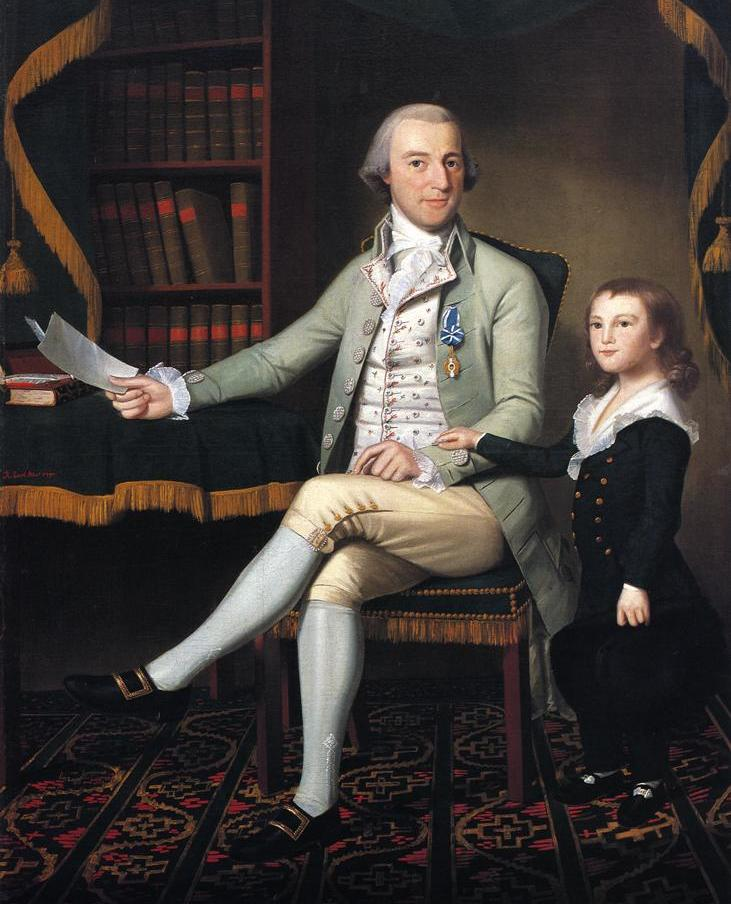
Benjamin Tallmadge with son William 1790

In 1829, Tallmadge was among a group of Federalists who defended Uriah Tracy against accusations by John Quincy Adams and William Plumer. Adams and Plumer had claimed Tracy was a leader of an 1804 effort to lead New England to secede from the United States.

== Personal life ==
Tallmadge married Mary Floyd (1764–1805) on March 18, 1784, daughter of William Floyd, a signer of the Declaration of Independence and a U.S Representative from New York. Their children included:

- William Smith Tallmadge (1785–1822), a lieutenant colonel in the 46th United States Infantry in the War of 1812; he died unmarried in Moscow, New York
- Henry Floyd Tallmadge (1787–1854), who married Maria Andrews Canfield (b. 1800).
- Maria Jones Tallmadge (1790–1878), who married John Paine Cushman (1784–1848), a member of the House of Representatives from New York's 10th congressional district
- Benjamin Tallmadge (1792–1831), who died unmarried near Gibraltar while a lieutenant in the United States Navy
- Frederick Augustus Tallmadge (1794–1869), who married Elizabeth H. Canfield (1793–1878)
- Harriet Wadsworth Tallmadge (1797–1856), who married John Delafield (1786–1853), brother of Edward Delafield and Richard Delafield
- George Washington Tallmadge (1803–1838), who married Laura Pease (1807–1893), daughter of Calvin Pease

== Death ==
Mary died in 1805, and Tallmadge married Maria Hallett (d. 1838) in 1808, daughter of his friend Joseph Hallett. Tallmadge died March 7, 1835, in Litchfield, Connecticut. He is buried in East Cemetery in Litchfield, Connecticut.

== Legacy ==
Fort Huachuca, Arizona, is the home of Army intelligence, and Tallmadge Hall there is named in Tallmadge's honor. The town of Tallmadge, Ohio is also named in Tallmadge's honor. The Boy Scouts of America's Benjamin Tallmadge District serves the north shore of Eastern Long Island.

Talmadge, Maine is named for Tallmadge, who owned the township in the early 1800s.

Tallmadge is a main character in the AMC series Turn: Washington's Spies, played by Seth Numrich.

Tallmadge is portrayed by Dave Morrissey, Jr., in the 2017 feature film One Life to Give and its sequel Traitor created by TBR News Media.

== See also ==
- Intelligence in the American Revolutionary War
- Intelligence operations in the American Revolutionary War

== Footnotes ==
U.S. House of Representatives
Preceded by William Edmond	Member of the U.S. House of Representatives from Connecticut's at-large congressional district March 4, 1801 – March 3, 1817	Succeeded by Thomas Scott Williams
