= Fort Salonga, New York =

- Hamlet and census-designated place
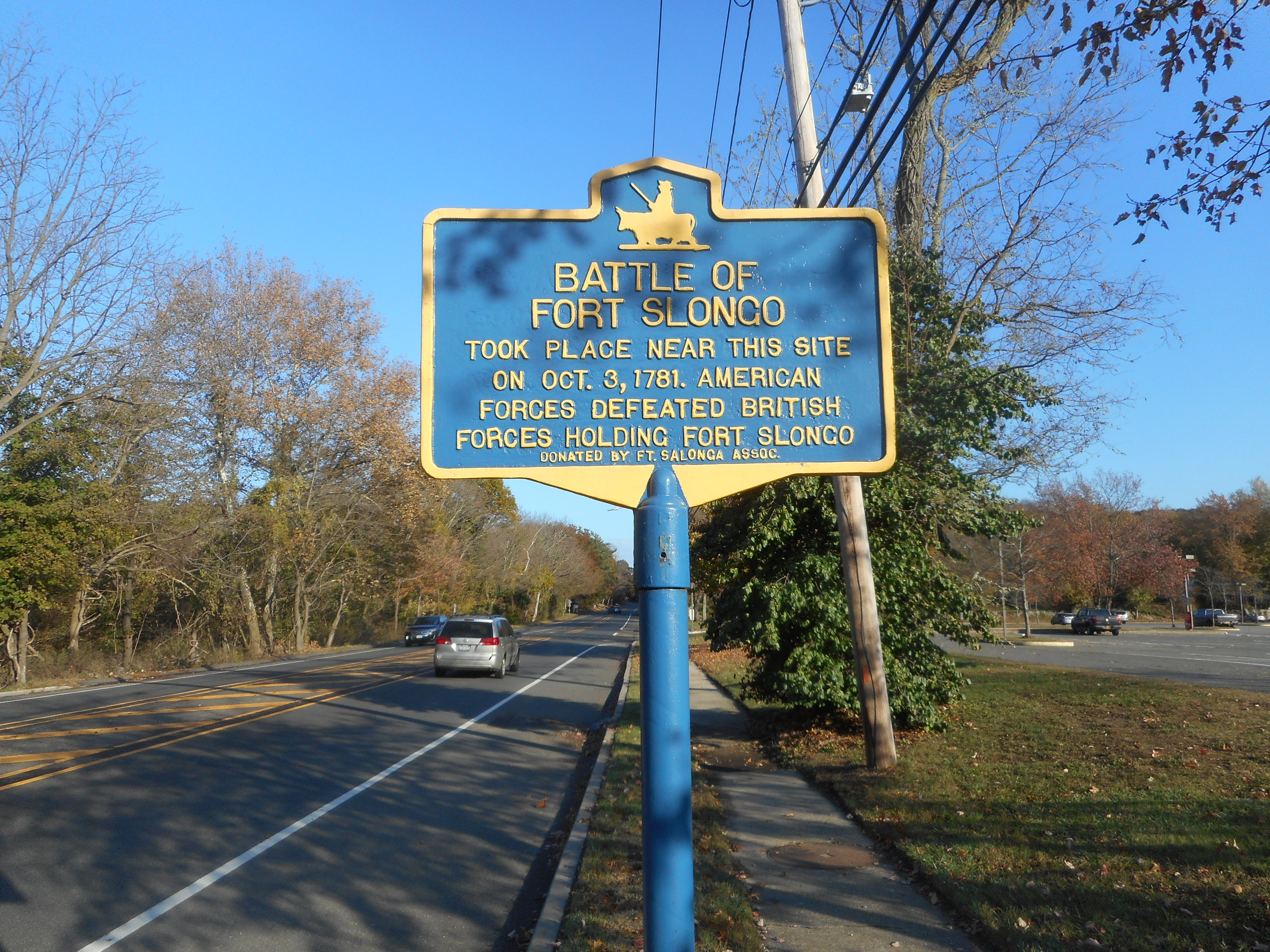
- Historic marker for the "Battle of Fort Slongo" along eastbound NY 25A.

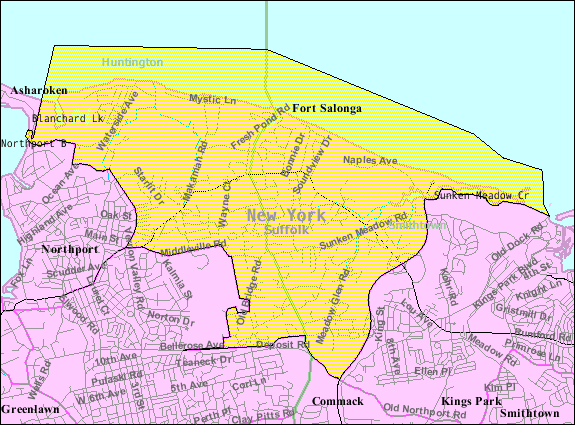
- U.S. Census map of Fort Salonga

- Location on Long Island and within the state of New York Fort Salonga, New York (New York)
- Coordinates: 40°54′21″N 73°18′4″W
- Country: United States
- State: New York
- County: Suffolk
- Towns: Huntington, Smithtown
- Named for: Fort Salonga

Area
  - Total: 13.23 sq mi (34.26 km^{2})
  - Land: 9.49 sq mi (24.58 km^{2})
  - Water: 3.74 sq mi (9.68 km^{2})
- Elevation: 33 ft (10 m)

Population (2020)
  - Total: 9,652
  - Density: 1,017.0/sq mi (392.67/km^{2})
- Time zone: UTC-5 (Eastern (EST))
  - Summer (DST): UTC-4 (EDT)
- ZIP code: 11768
- Area codes: 631, 934
- FIPS code: 36-26946
- GNIS feature ID: 0950497
- Website: www.fortsalonga.org

Fort Salonga is a hamlet and census-designated place (CDP) in the Towns of Huntington and Smithtown in Suffolk County, on the North Shore of Long Island, in New York, United States. As of the 2020 census, Fort Salonga had a population of 9,652.

The hamlet is considered the easternmost part of the historic Gold Coast of Long Island, with the Geissler Estate being located within the hamlet.

== History ==
One night during the Revolutionary War, Colonial forces landed on the beach in nearby Crab Meadow, and moving down the beach overtook the fort.

In the post-Civil War era the rich red clay deposits gave birth to a successful brickworks as well as other trade. Barges loaded with manure swept from the streets of New York City would arrive, and farmers from nearby towns would come to get the manure for fertilizer. The emptied barges were then loaded with bricks for the trip back to the city. One of the brick companies to operate there in the late 19th century was owned by the Brown family, whose bricks bore the initials BBB for Brown's Best Bricks. The family home on the top of the hill on Breeze Hill Road has served as the clubhouse for the Indian Hills Country Club since 1963.

=== The hamlet's name ===
The area was formerly known as Fresh Pond, however once the post office opened it changed its name to Fort Salonga since there was already a Fresh Pond post office.

The name evolved from the Revolutionary War-era British Fort Salonga, or Fort Slongo, (named after one of the fort's architects) once located near the border of the towns of Huntington and Smithtown, overlooking the Long Island Sound.

Historically, Fort Salonga had its own post office, located at the intersection of 25a, and Bread and Cheese hollow Road . However, it closed sometime in 1924.Fort Salonga now shares the Northport 11768 zip code and is still recognized as acceptable mailing address alternative by the USA post office.

== Geography ==
According to the United States Census Bureau, the CDP has a total area of 9.9 square miles (25.7 km^{2}), of which 9.8 square miles (25.5 km^{2}) is land and 0.12 square miles (0.3 km^{2}), or 1.12%, is water.

Fort Salonga borders Northport to the west, Kings Park to the east, and East Northport to the southwest.

The Fort Salonga CDP includes the hamlet of Crab Meadow.

== Demographics ==
Historical population
Census	Pop.	Note	%±
2020	9,652		—
U.S. Decennial Census

=== 2020 census ===
As of the 2020 census, Fort Salonga had a population of 9,652. The median age was 49.3 years. 19.1% of residents were under the age of 18 and 21.8% of residents were 65 years of age or older. For every 100 females there were 98.7 males, and for every 100 females age 18 and over there were 97.8 males age 18 and over.

100.0% of residents lived in urban areas, while 0.0% lived in rural areas.

There were 3,299 households in Fort Salonga, of which 30.8% had children under the age of 18 living in them. Of all households, 69.0% were married-couple households, 11.0% were households with a male householder and no spouse or partner present, and 16.7% were households with a female householder and no spouse or partner present. About 14.7% of all households were made up of individuals and 8.4% had someone living alone who was 65 years of age or older.

There were 3,430 housing units, of which 3.8% were vacant. The homeowner vacancy rate was 0.7% and the rental vacancy rate was 2.5%.

Racial composition as of the 2020 census
Race	Number	Percent
White	8,603	89.1%
Black or African American	83	0.9%
American Indian and Alaska Native	14	0.1%
Asian	228	2.4%
Native Hawaiian and Other Pacific Islander	1	0.0%
Some other race	119	1.2%
Two or more races	604	6.3%
Hispanic or Latino (of any race)	619	6.4%

=== 2000 census ===
At the 2000 census, there were 9,634 people, 3,225 households, and 2,715 families residing in the CDP. The population density was 1,068.8 inhabitants per square mile (412.7/km^{2}). There were 3,310 housing units at an average density of 367.2 per square mile (141.8/km^{2}). The racial makeup of the CDP was 96.83% White, 0.61% African American, 0.05% Native American, 1.71% Asian, 0.28% from other races, and 0.51% from two or more races. Hispanic or Latino of any race were 2.25% of the population.

There were 3,225 households, out of which 37.9% had children under the age of 18 living with them, 75.8% were married couples living together, 6.1% had a female householder with no husband present, and 15.8% were non-families. 12.0% of all households were made up of individuals, and 4.6% had someone living alone who was 65 years of age or older. The average household size was 2.96 and the average family size was 3.22.

In the CDP, the population was spread out, with 25.9% under the age of 18, 5.1% from 18 to 24, 27.6% from 25 to 44, 29.8% from 45 to 64, and 11.5% who were 65 years of age or older. The median age was 40 years. For every 100 females, there were 98.1 males. For every 100 females age 18 and over, there were 97.8 males.

=== Income and poverty ===
Fort Salonga is an affluent location, with a median family income for a household in the CDP of $98,128, and the median income for a family was $106,253. Males had a median income of $70,663 versus $51,694 for females. The per capita income for the CDP was $41,933. About 2.5% of families and 3.3% of the population were below the poverty line, including 5.4% of those under age 18 and 1.5% of those age 65 or over.

== Education ==
Historically, the Fort Salonga school district had its school, which consisted of a single schoolhouse. However, in 1926, like most school districts on Long Island, NY, it integrated itself into the neighboring school districts depending on what part of the hamlet it was in.

The portion of Fort Salonga located within the Town of Huntington is located within the boundaries of (and is thus served by) the Northport-East Northport Union Free School District, while the portion located within the Town of Smithtown is located within the boundaries of (and is thus served by) the Kings Park Central School District. As such, children who reside within Fort Salonga and attend public schools go to school in one of these two districts, depending on where they live within Fort Salonga.

The school district boundary within Fort Salonga overlaps with the town boundaries, following Bread and Cheese Hollow Road.

== Fire Department ==
Fort Salonga is served by the Northport Fire Department on the northwestern portion of the hamlet, the East Northport Fire Department to the southwest, and the Kings Park Fire Department to the east.

== Notable residents ==
Elijah Churchill (1755–1841) was a notable figure associated with Fort Salonga, New York. Born in Newington, Connecticut, he served as a sergeant in the Continental Army during the American Revolutionary War. Churchill distinguished himself in several engagements, notably leading an attack on Fort Slongo (now Fort Salonga) on October 3, 1781. For his valor in this and other actions, he became one of the first recipients of the Badge of Military Merit, the predecessor to the modern Purple Heart.

Booker T. Washington (1856–1915) was an influential African-American educator, author, and advisor to multiple U.S. presidents, including Theodore Roosevelt. He was the founding principal of the Tuskegee Institute in Alabama and a leading advocate for African-American economic self-sufficiency and education during the late 19th and early 20th centuries. Washington maintained a residence in Fort Salonga, New York, where he spent time away from his duties at Tuskegee during the summer.

Torrey Devitto, actress from Pretty Little Liars, and The Vampire Diaries.
