= Elijah Churchill =

American Revolutionary War soldier

- Born: September 5, 1755; Newington, Connecticut
- Died: April 11, 1841 (aged 85); Massachusetts
- Burial place: Bell Cemetery at Middlefield, Massachusetts
- Spouse: Elinor Nooney (m. 1777 – 1846)
- Children: Sophia (1782–1782); Elijah Jr. (1784–1796); James (b. 1785); Eleanor (1788–1790); Eleanor (b. 1790); Giles (b. 1793); Charles (b. 1796); Sophia (b. 1798)
- Military career
- Allegiance: United States
- Branch: Continental Army
- Service years: 1775–1783
- Rank: Sergeant
- Conflicts: American Revolutionary War
- Awards: Badge of Military Merit

Elijah Churchill (September 5, 1755 – April 11, 1841) was a soldier for the Continental Army during the American Revolutionary War.

== Early life ==
Elijah Churchill was born on September 5, 1755, in Newington, Connecticut. His father was named Giles.

== Military career ==
Churchill entered the 8th Connecticut Regiment as a private on 7 July 1775. On 7 May 1777, he re-enlisted for the duration of the war as a corporal in the 2nd Continental Light Dragoons, later the 2nd Legionary Corps, and was promoted to sergeant on 2 October 1780. He was cited for gallantry in action at Fort St. George near Brookhaven, New York on Long Island, in November 1780, at Tarrytown, New York, in July 1781, and at Fort Slongo (now known as Fort Salonga, also on Long Island) on October 2, 1781. He was awarded the Badge of Military Merit for his actions, one of only three soldiers to receive the award.

== Later life and death ==
Once the American Revolutionary War was completed, Churchill moved to Massachusetts. In 1784 he lived in Enfield. He died on April 11, 1841.
