= List of Turn: Washington's Spies episodes =

Turn: Washington's Spies (stylized as TURИ: Washington's Spies) is an American period drama television series developed by Craig Silverstein and based on Alexander Rose’s book Washington's Spies: The Story of America's First Spy Ring (2007), a history of the Culper Ring. The series aired on AMC from April 6, 2014, through August 12, 2017. During the course of the series, 40 episodes of Turn: Washington's Spies aired, concluding on August 12, 2017.

== Series overview ==
Season	Episodes	Originally released	
Season	Episodes	First released	Last released
1	10	April 6, 2014	June 8, 2014
2	10	April 13, 2015	June 8, 2015
3	10	April 25, 2016	June 27, 2016
4	10	June 17, 2017	August 12, 2017

== Episodes ==
=== Season 1 (2014) ===
No. overall	No. in season	Title	Directed by	Written by	Original release date	US viewers (millions)
1	1	"Pilot"	Rupert Wyatt	Teleplay by : Craig Silverstein	April 6, 2014	2.12
In autumn 1776, in Setauket, New York, Abraham Woodhull tells his wife, Mary, the war will end by Christmas. After a battle in New Jersey, Benjamin Tallmadge escapes in Queen's Rangers attire but not before being shot by Robert Rogers. Ben goes to meet General Charles Scott to insist his men were ambushed, as the enemy knew they were coming. Ben suggests a spy should be hired, but the general declines. At a tavern, Abe defends proprietors Selah and Anna Strong in a fight instigated by British Captain Joyce. British Major Hewlett orders Joyce back to England to be court martialled and cashiered, and releases Abe into the care of his father, Judge Richard Woodhull. In Brooklyn Harbor, Rogers is paid as a mercenary. Major John André asks him to ambush a rebel safe house in Connecticut. Rogers refuses when André balks on doubling his price. The next day, Joyce is found dead just outside Abe's farm. The new British captain, John Graves Simcoe, launches an investigation into the murder; Selah and Abe are prime suspects. Abe meets his old friend Caleb Brewster, who tries to recruit him into a spy ring. Abe initially refuses and is intercepted when headed home accused of smuggling and perhaps spying. When Abe returns to town, he is arrested and questioned. Abe claims a group of rebels attacked him, and he gives a list of false names from neighboring Hempstead. Several days later, Abe's father visits Abe to tell him no men by those names exist. Abe has lied to his father, who because of it says he will no longer protect Abe.
2	2	"Who by Fire"	Ed Bianchi	Craig Silverstein	April 13, 2014	1.87
After Abe warns her she is a suspect in Captain Joyce's murder, Anna looks through Joyce's belongings, which are still in her house, for evidence that will exonerate her. She finds a love letter suggesting a signal to meet. In a Connecticut jail, Ben and Caleb interrogate Simcoe, who refuses to give answers. He mocks the rebel cause, and Caleb beats him. Rogers begins tracking the soldier who left the Ranger bonnet at the ambush scene, which leads him to investigate Joyce's murder. At the tavern, he questions Abe and Anna, who produces the love letter and suggests Joyce was killed by a jealous husband. After being discovered by Abe, John Robeson admits that he and Joyce were lovers but he killed Joyce for blaming him for starting the tavern brawl. Robeson also admits his intention to make Abe a scapegoat. Ensign Clayton emerges and attacks Abe. Rogers emerges, kills Clayton, then confronts Robeson. Rogers lets Robeson live, but only to serve as Rogers' agent in Setauket, holding accusations of buggery over Robeson. Abe is sworn to secrecy but tasked with monitoring Robeson. General Scott saves Simcoe from death and orders Ben to report to Fort Lee to face disciplinary charges. Concerned about Anna's safety, Abe tells her to stop hanging petticoat signals for Caleb and then ends all contact with her.
3	3	"Of Cabbages and Kings"	SJ Clarkson	Michael Taylor	April 20, 2014	1.40
Ben, Caleb, and General Scott, with a bound Simcoe in a cart, lead a military convoy to Fort Lee. On the way, refugees tell them the fort has been taken by the British, and General Washington may have been captured. A farmer lets the men stay the night. Brothers Quill, Eben, and Newt guard Simcoe, and Caleb leaves them, stating he is scouting ahead. Eben thinks Caleb is deserting and worries that they are fighting for the losing side. The brothers ambush the new arrivals to exchange them with the British for pardons and money. Ben surprises the brothers, killing all but Newt. Scott orders Ben to execute Newt or face a court martial, but Ben refuses to shoot the lad, insisting Newt was the most passive of the three. Scott shoots Newt, and says Ben will face a court martial. Richard and Abe arrive at the British Army-controlled New York City. They are greeted by Colonel Cook, Richard's contact, and Richard introduces Abe as his son and business partner. Over dinner, the three men negotiate the Woodhull's sale of pigs to Cook, who then follows up an earlier conversation with Richard about trading cauliflower. Abe realizes Richard is selling cauliflower grown on Anna's farm, whose produce Richard admits will be divided among loyalists, in the wake of Strong's imprisonment. Abe and his father argue, and Abe leaves. He arrives at King's College, his law school alma mater, where he learns from Hessians camped there the invading army will be marching to Trenton. Abe later tells this to Caleb. Anna learns that Simcoe is alive, but she tells Abe he's dead. She and Abe are able to secure a boat for Caleb's escape.
4	4	"Eternity How Long"	Adam Davidson	Andrew Colville	April 27, 2014	1.30
Fearing Caleb's escape will preface a rebel attack, Hewlett must think of ways to fortify the garrison. His plan is to use gravestones from the Setauket church cemetery. Richard is given three days to decide which ten will be removed. Abe warns him the town will turn against him if the gravestones are removed, adding that the town should turn against Hewlett; Richard ignores the advice. Caleb gives Abe's report on the Hessians' march on Trenton to Ben, mentioning Abe's success. Ben urges General Scott to share the intelligence with General Washington. When they refuse to reveal their source, Scott burns the unverified report. Ben and Caleb later fabricate a scouting report and fold Abe's intelligence inside. Scott declares the fake worthy of passing to Washington, overlooking the real one. Andre and Philomena trap General Charles Lee into saying he supplied the British with the location of the safe house, where the ambush occurred, but Lee insists he doesn't know about the attack. Andre reveals that he is Lee's contact to whom the information is given. They then discuss a plan in which Lee escapes, and his hero status propels him to become the new commander of the Continental Army. Lee would then urge the Continental Congress to surrender. Abe suggests Richard call Hewlett's bluff and lead the townspeople against him, since Hewlett does not want to lose Setauket. Richard likes the idea. There is face-off in the cemetery. Richard intervenes, invokes God, and starts digging up his son Thomas' gravestone. Hewlett tells Lt. Appleton this is "how you tame a colony...through winning their hearts and minds".
5	5	"Epiphany"	Michael Uppendahl	Aida Mashaka Croal	May 4, 2014	1.24
It's Christmas in Setauket. Richard signs a bill of attainder against Selah Strong, which Hewlett posts at Strong Manor, that includes a phrase about granting freedom to his slaves. The slaves celebrate. The next day, Abe tells Richard he wants to go to New York to try and sell additional goods to William Howe's army. He asks for Colonel Cook's letter that affords passage through British checkpoints. Richard refuses and Abe later sneaks into Hewlett's room to copy a letter from Hewlett's desk. Anna appeals the attainder to Hewlett, saying unprepared freed slaves don't know how to fend for themselves. Hewlett says the male slaves are being shipped for war and has made arrangements for Abigail. Ben is told to prepare for a secret mission. He and Caleb find themselves among an entire fleet in the Delaware River. After jumping into the icy water to save a boat gun, Ben loses consciousness into the new year, when Caleb tells him the men have marched on to Trenton. Abigail offers to spy on her future employer, Major Andre, if Anna protects Cicero, her son, while she's away. Anna agrees. She and Abe later share a highly passionate kiss but are interrupted by Baker recommending Abe join his family at Whitehall. In Trenton, Ben and Caleb learn the army successfully ambushed the Hessian soldiers. Washington heeded Abe's report. Across the creek, Andre suggests General Cornwallis attack the rebels. Cornwallis, believing Washington's entire force is over there, decides against a night attack. Back at City Hall, Rogers asks Lee the name of the dragoon who escaped. Lee gives him the name, Benjamin Tallmadge. The next morning, Cornwallis raids the opposite bank, only to find it abandoned. Abe is welcomed by his family at Whitehall, where they dine with Hewlett and other Redcoats. At Continental headquarters in Morristown, New Jersey, Washington asks Ben about Abraham Woodhull.
6	6	"Mr. Culpeper"	Eagle Egilsson	Mitchell Akselrad	May 11, 2014	1.08
British and American soldiers exchange POWs. A limping Simcoe is one of them. Washington dictates a letter to Howe indicting the barbaric prisoner treatment on ships. He then introduces Ben and Scott to Nathaniel Sackett, who praises Abe's accurate intelligence. Washington orders them to investigate Ben's "spy chain" idea and report back with a recommendation. Simcoe and others arrive at Andre's estate. Andre interviews them, one of which is Lt. Terrence, a spy for Washington. In New York, Rogers suggests a fight between the brawling Jordan and Titus that others can wager on. Later, Jordan wins the fight and Rogers welcomes him into the Queen's Rangers. Awasos approaches, speaking in Abenaki, to tell Rogers that Ben's brother, Samuel, has been reported held aboard the prison ship HMS Jersey. In Long Island, Abe is ambushed and interrogated by Cyrus, a colonial soldier separated from his unit. Abe insists he himself is a spy. Cyrus doesn't believe him, asking why he didn't join the militia. Abe says they cannot win. They start fighting. A group of Redcoats arrive and shoot a charging Cyrus dead. Abe suggests Cyrus was planning on assuming his identity and escaping to the city. He is told solo travelers are no longer being allowed into New York. At dinner, Simcoe kills Terrence for incorrectly reciting his regiment's motto. Andre says he planned to try to turn Terrence into a double agent. Sackett shows Ben a way to send messages using hard-boiled eggs, alum, and vinegar. Ben tells Washington the spy chain will work, but only with mutual trust. He again asks how Washington obtained Abe's name. Washington tells Ben in private he obtained Abe's name from one of his spies: Nathan Hale, Ben's friend at Yale who was recently hanged by the British. Scott is sent to the war front, and Ben is promoted to Major and put in charge of the intelligence branch. Abe is then given an alias, "Mr. Culpeper", and Ben is asked to pick a first name. He chooses "Samuel".
7	7	"Mercy Moment Murder Measure"	Nick Copus	Story by : Joseph Bellotti; Teleplay by : Andrew Colville & Michael Taylor & Craig Silverstein	May 18, 2014	1.09
Aboard the Jersey, Rogers learns Samuel Tallmadge died of dysentery. He is shown the prisoner that knew Samuel best, Selah Strong, who Jordan instantly recognizes. Selah tells Rogers he's known Samuel and Ben his entire life. Rogers asks Selah if he'd like to go home. Ben receives word Samuel has been pardoned and is being released. Caleb offers to go pick up Samuel. Abe hates his Culpeper alias, but is surprised to learn it was picked by General Washington himself. Anna's request for Selah's parole is denied when she accuses Richard of forcing a confession to claim and sell Selah's land. Abe asks her to accompany him, posing as his wife for the checkpoints, to New York to sell her cauliflower crop. She learns Simcoe is alive and returned to Setauket. She admits to Abe of covering up Simcoe's escape so Abe would stay loyal to the cause. At Whitehall, Simcoe asks Hewlett's permission to inquire about the Tallmadge and Brewster families. Hewlett agrees, but cautions him. In the woods, Simcoe attacks Abe for "forcing himself" on Anna at Christmas. They are summoned to the church, where Baker tells Simcoe that Anna's dalliance with Abe was consensual. Abe accepts Simcoe's challenge to a duel. Abe wins the first shot, but shoots and misses. Richard and Anna arrive, and she convinces Simcoe to misfire. However, Abe reloads and aims at Simcoe. Richard pleads that it is about more than him. Abe pictures Thomas, Caleb and Ben, then looks at Anna. He lowers his gun and walks away. Jordan accompanies Rogers to ambush Ben, who they think will be coming for his brother. Caleb rides his horse through the woods believing he is collecting Samuel. Abe and Anna set off for New York. She tells him he should have killed Simcoe when he had the chance.
8	8	"Challenge"	Jeremy Webb	LaToya Morgan	May 25, 2014	1.39
Rogers fires upon Caleb and Selah at the POW exchange, wounding a soldier. He is found and rebuked by British Captain Blake for firing during a truce. Caleb tells Henry to find Ben at camp and mention "Genevieve", a code word indicating a meeting point that Ben will understand. When Anna goes to retreat her husband, shis is mistakenly told that Selah is dead. Back at the hotel, she insists on accompanying Abe to Andre's dinner. He refuses. She finds Abigail and demands help getting into the dinner. Abe arrives at the party and Cooke introduces the nervous new arrival to Andre. Ben encounters Henry's convoy and is told Caleb's code word. He rides off and, drawn by the sound of gunfire, arrives and shoots Awasos then ducks for cover with Caleb as Rogers fires back. Both sides are now at a standoff. Simcoe tells Robeson he is investigating a rebel conspiracy and inquires about Ben, Caleb and Abe. Robeson advises him to track down the petition for the New York convention. Later, while Abe is singing a song, he sees Anna at the party. Blake arrives at Andre's house with news of Rogers firing on the prisoner exchange. Andre tells him to retrieve Rogers and to kill him if he resists. Selah tells Ben about Samuel's final days. Ben vows to kill Rogers for using Samuel's name to trap him. Blake arrives and declares it to end by order of John Andre. Blake orders Rogers to report to Andre. Anna sneaks into Andre's bedroom and discovers a book of encoded entries. Abe follows and kisses her, but she resists. They later have sex when she learns he started the riot at King's College that resulted in the death of his brother (implying that Abe only broke off his engagement with Anna and married his brother's ex-fiancee out of guilt). Rogers says Selah is not who he says he is; Ben lies, saying Selah is his brother, Captain Samuel Tallmadge. Hewlett recalls Richard saying Selah Strong was named as a delegate to an illegal body. He encourages Simcoe to continue searching for Setauket rebels.
9	9	"Against Thy Neighbor"	Ken Fink	Michael Taylor	June 1, 2014	1.17
It's spring 1777. Ben tells Washington decoded enemy dispatches show the British plan to attack Philadelphia from the south, rather than the north as scouts have reported. Ben is told to lead troops north to play into Britain's deception, while the Continental Army strengthens the southerly defenses. Caleb and Selah march with Ben's troops. Hewlett tells Simcoe he lacks evidence of spies and still hasn't found the Patriot petition. Simcoe poisons Hewlett's horse with an apple and suggests Hewlett was the intended target. Simcoe volunteers to investigate Lucas Brewster, who sold the apples to Hewlett. Richard tells Simcoe to consult another expert before executing Lucas, but is then shot by a sniper. Simcoe smiles. The bullet gets extracted, and Simcoe reports a torn Bible page used as wadding for the sniper's gun. Hewlett decrees that all town residents shall surrender their firearms, and Reverend Tallmadge remarks to Hewlett that the church was once his. Talmadge later tells tavern patrons that the British took their church, their headstones, and now their guns. Simcoe arrests him. Hewlett tells Abe the evidence points to Tallmadge as the sniper. Hewlett is given the petition and tells Simcoe to arrest everyone on it. Abe offers to take the wounded Richard's place as the magistrate in prosecuting the rebels, and he intensely interrogates Brewster (inciting sympathy and support for Brewster amongst the townspeople) and then Rev. Tallmadge, saying Talmadge grew resentful with Richard after his congregation defected from the church. Abe demonstrates how Richard was shot and pretends to struggle as he loads the Reverend's rifle. Simcoe takes the rifle but finds the bullet that pierced Richard does not fit the gun. Hewlett later tells Abe he will show mercy on the men and sentence them to ten years on the Jersey. Abe likens that to a death sentence and reminds him the bullet didn't match the Reverend's rifle. Hewlett stresses it is an opportunity to banish a group of disloyal citizens. On the road, Ben learns his father and Caleb's uncle have been arrested and may face death. He tells Caleb they are going home. At Woodhull Farm, Mary finds Abe's hidden codebook.
10	10	"The Battle of Setauket"	Oliver Hirschbiegel	Craig Silverstein	June 8, 2014	1.61
At Woodhull Farm, Mary finds familiar names in Abe's codebook. Abe arrives and confides Simcoe shot Richard. A boy tells Simcoe about hundreds of soldiers descending on Setauket. Simcoe sets out to hang the rebel prisoners before Ben and the others arrive. Ben's men charge, but he orders a retreat when he sees his father with a gun to his head. Selah arrives and kisses a stunned Anna. Ben tells Caleb to collect the British's gunpowder from the schoolhouse. Hewlett sees the gunpowder being gathered and orders his men to fire. The schoolhouse explodes. Ben orders Selah to attack Hewlett's flank with some men. Hewlett refuses to level Setauket. Selah's men fire and force Hewlett's retreat into the church. Abe and the others convene. He explains their commuted death sentences, and Ben replies Samuel died on the Jersey and refuses to let his father die the same way. Abe approaches the church waving a white flag. Inside, he offers to trade the captured Redcoats for the rebel prisoners. Simcoe drags Lucas Brewster outside and shoots him dead. Hewlett orders his men to arrest Simcoe, who resists and is gagged by Hewlett. Richard suggests letting the prisoners go so Tallmadge can convince Ben to leave. Hewlett releases them and the rebels fall back. Abe tells Ben that he wants to keep spying—as Culper, not Culpeper. Selah helps Anna into a boat and they launch. Redcoats arrive to watch from the shoreline. Abe also arrives, and Anna apologizes to Selah and jumps overboard to swim to shore. In New York, Andre relieves Rogers as head of the Queen's Rangers. Rogers threatens repercussions and exits. At home, Abe finds Mary burning his codebook. She calls him, among other things, a spy for Washington. Ensign Baker overhears and says he must turn Abe in. Abe shoots and kills him when his offer to leave for good is refused. Mary immediately invents a cover story of Baker being shot while trying to stop fleeing rebels, who then burned down the house. She lights a candle and later joins Abe and Thomas outside. They watch their house burn with Baker's body inside.

=== Season 2 (2015) ===
No. overall	No. in season	Title	Directed by	Written by	Original release date	US viewers (millions)
11	1	"Thoughts of a Free Man"	Gary Fleder	Craig Silverstein	April 13, 2015	0.827
In the fall of 1777, King George III angrily destroys part of a confidential document while posing for a bust by American sculptor Patience Wright. Wright, a Patriot sympathizer, secretly conceals the stolen page inside the sculpture and ships it to America. When the theft is discovered, Wright is assassinated, and the Crown assigns Robert Rogers to recover the document, restoring his status in exchange for success. Across the Atlantic, following the British capture of Philadelphia, General George Washington faces increasing criticism from Congress and rival officers. He orders Benjamin Tallmadge to reactivate the Culper Ring or find a replacement capable of gathering intelligence in British-occupied New York. In Setauket, Abraham Woodhull and his wife, Mary, live under the watch of Major Edmund Hewlett after the destruction of their farm. Abe resolves to resume spying under the cover of studying law in New York City, despite Mary’s objections and the strain on their marriage. Hewlett allows the trip but assigns Abe a British escort and shows an interest in pursuing Anna Strong. Back in the Continental camp, Washington is publicly undermined by officers, including General Charles Lee, but receives a spirited defense from General Benedict Arnold, newly returned from victory at Saratoga. Meanwhile, in British-occupied Philadelphia, Major John André continues to cultivate influence, unaware that his servant, Abigail, is secretly passing information to the Patriots.
12	2	"Hard Boiled"	Andrew McCarthy	Michael Taylor	April 13, 2015	0.827
Abe arrives in Brooklyn Ferry with Corporal Eastin. Eastin suspiciously wonders why Abe needs an escort on the road but not while in the city. Meanwhile, Abe takes mental notes on the military activity and observes that the British naval presence is still strong. In Philadelphia, Captain Simcoe has been assigned to the commissary while awaiting his court-martial. A supervisor mocks a love letter that Simcoe has written to Anna. Simcoe receives a package from John André containing a steak knife and letter. He brandishes the knife at his supervisor and declares that he’s been relieved of his duties and summoned by André. With a smug grin, he ditches his post. Elsewhere in Philadelphia, André and General Henry Clinton admire the seized home of Benjamin Franklin. Abigail serves the men drinks and overhears the conversation about André’s mole, Charles Lee. André tells Clinton that he’s planning to turn General Benedict Arnold. Abe checks into a boarding house and asks the owner to boil a dozen eggs for him. He then asks some fellow boarders where all the soldiers have gone in the city. A boarder tells him that sailors have been building ships on the west wharf. The owner suspiciously watches Abe leave. Abe traverses the streets of York City, taking copious notes in his concealed notepad. He estimates that an attack of 5,000 men could take over the city and end the war. In Setauket, Mary sits with her sewing circle and a new addition: Anna. Mary suggests they organize a charity for the families of soldiers who’ve died in battle. When her companions complain about costs, Anna suggests they secure provisions from a privateer. Mary smiles gratefully at Anna. Hewlett interrupts and asks Mary if she has received a heavy package for him from London. Mary offers to look out for it. He shyly notices Anna and makes awkward conversation with her. The ladies giggle after he leaves, noting his attraction to Anna. Abigail arrives at André’s house to find Simcoe waiting for André. Simcoe recognizes her from Strong Manor and speaks fondly of Long Island. In the music room, André tells Simcoe that he’d like to appoint him as the new commander of the Queen’s Rangers. Simcoe calls the assignment a demotion but agrees to accept if he may base the Rangers in a place of his choosing. Abigail furtively scribbles a note and hides it in the hem of a shirt. She later tells André she’d like to send the shirt to her son, Cicero, in Setauket. He offers to deliver it at once. Abe continues to case the city, noting heavy naval activity at the west wharf. In his notepad, he describes all the artillery and ships. At the boarding house, Abe encrypts his notes on hard-boiled eggs using invisible ink. He then holds the eggs over a flame. The owner walks in by accident and asks if something is wrong with the eggs. Abe lies and says he likes his eggs warm. Hewlett pays a late-night visit to Anna at DeJong Tavern to deliver Abigail’s package. He tells Anna that he has asked the Magistrate to grant her a divorce and suggests they establish a platonic friendship. He rambles awkwardly but stops upon realizing that Anna does not share his feelings. After Hewlett has left, Anna opens the package and finds Abigail’s note: “General Lee a traitor.” André and Clinton attend a lavish ball at the Shippen house, a party meant to welcome the British to Philadelphia. André flirts with Peggy Shippen, the youngest daughter. As they dance, he inquires about Benedict Arnold, who once stayed at her house. “I wonder what games are we playing now?” she asks. As Abe checks out of the boarding house, the owner puts bread in Abe’s lunch basket for the trip back home. He remarks that Abe looks very tan for a man who’s been buried in books. Abe meets Eastin at the checkpoint and realizes that the eggs have disappeared from his lunch basket. Abe runs back to the boarding house and tells the owner he left something behind. Abe suddenly realizes the owner took his eggs — and yet, curiously, didn’t turn him in. He asks the owner for his name. “Robert Townsend,” the owner replies. “And I don’t care to see you here again.” In the woods of Pennsylvania, Jordan and the rest of the Queen’s Rangers idle around their camp. Simcoe arrives on horseback and introduces himself as their new commander. Cager, one of the Rangers, mocks Simcoe’s Royal Officer uniform, drawing snickers from the others. Simcoe breaks Cager’s arm and slashes his scalp. When Cager reaches for his gun, Jordan shouts out a warning. Simcoe shoots Cager dead, then orders the men to fall in line. They immediately obey.
13	3	"False Flag"	Allison Anders	LaToya Morgan	April 20, 2015	0.865
Abraham Woodhull returns from his first reconnaissance mission in British-occupied New York City with valuable intelligence on troop strength and naval forces. He reveals to Anna Strong that he has been posing as a double agent for Major Edmund Hewlett, a strategy Anna criticizes as reckless, though she ultimately agrees to monitor Hewlett in Abe’s absence. Judge Woodhull grows suspicious after witnessing secret dealings between Abe and Hewlett, but is caught searching Hewlett’s quarters. Hewlett informs Judge Woodhull of his and Abe's apparent plan to spy on Patriot operatives in New York and the two men agree to keep from Abe that Judge Woodhull is aware of the plot. At General Washington’s headquarters, Abe’s report is praised, but Washington dismisses the intelligence provided by Abigail suggesting General Charles Lee’s disloyalty, citing its unverified source. Frustrated, Benjamin Tallmadge works with Nathaniel Sackett to test Lee’s loyalty by forging correspondence using a polygraph duplicator and intercepting Lee’s response. Lee’s letter confirms his contempt for Washington, but Washington angrily rebukes Tallmadge, arguing that internal conflict could jeopardize critical French support for the American cause. In Philadelphia, Major John André asks Peggy Shippen to write to Benedict Arnold, initially offending her before she later complies. Arnold, suffering from severe injuries, reacts bitterly to a hollow promotion and voices resentment toward the Continental Congress and Washington. Tallmadge exploits Arnold’s outgoing correspondence to deliver the forged letter. Meanwhile, Sackett sends Caleb Brewster to retrieve the bust of King George III, which contains the crucial document, stolen by artist Patience Wright. Caleb arrives just ahead of Robert Rogers, who is operating under the authority of the royal seal, only to learn the bust has been seized by rebel privateers, prompting both men to race to recover it first. While training his new Rangers in military discipline and precision, Simcoe grants Akinbode his freedom papers.
14	4	"Men of Blood"	Kate Dennis	Alexander Rose	April 27, 2015	0.591
Benjamin Tallmadge surprises Abraham Woodhull at the Setauket dead drop and introduces Abe and Anna Strong to new spycraft, including invisible ink and Nathaniel Sackett’s toy boat containing instructions for Abigail on proper intelligence reporting. Abe tells Ben he is attempting to recruit New York boardinghouse owner Robert Townsend as a Patriot agent. At Whitehall, Anna persuades British Major Edmund Hewlett to send the toy boat to Abigail in Philadelphia. Hewlett invites her to see the contents of a newly arrived crate. In New York City, Abe evades a man following him and confronts Townsend, who initially rebuffs him but later agrees to further contact after a tense exchange. Outside, Abe and the follower are attacked by thieves; the man is fatally stabbed and reveals he was hired by Abe’s father to track Abe. Abe later confronts Judge Woodhull, but Hewlett intervenes and proposes that Abe share his intelligence. Abe falsely claims to have identified a Sons of Liberty contact to deflect suspicion. Elsewhere, Caleb Brewster locates privateer Captain Ryder, whose crew seized the wax bust of King George III containing stolen British intelligence. When Robert Rogers attacks the hideout, Caleb destroys the bust, recovers the documents, and escapes. Meanwhile, Major John André continues courting Peggy Shippen, rebuking offensive inquiries from her stern, disapproving father while advancing his plan to undermine Benedict Arnold by spreading rumors of Arnold's greed. Arnold, who continues to suffer from his injuries, becomes resentful after learning that Washington did not defend him against such claims, and he offers Tallmadge a position as aide-de-camp, a position which would require him to abandon espionage.
15	5	"Sealed Fate"	Keith Boak	Mitchell Akselrad	May 4, 2015	0.631
In a 1775 flashback, Robert Rogers offers his services to General George Washington, who suspects him of espionage and orders his arrest, prompting Rogers to vow revenge. In the present, a Redcoat deserter named Arthur Sutherland surrenders to the Continental forces assembled at Valley Forge and warns Benjamin Tallmadge that a civilian, Bill Shanks, will arrive as a British spy to assassinate Washington. When Shanks appears claiming to have uncovered a plot to assassinate Washington, Tallmadge and Nathaniel Sackett struggle to determine which man is trustworthy. Caleb Brewster delivers the intelligence recovered from the wax bust of King George III, revealing Britain’s bleak financial situation. Washington sends the information to French intelligence officer Théveneau de Francy, hoping to secure French support, while using decoys to evade Rogers. Meanwhile, Tallmadge uncovers inconsistencies in Shanks’ story and realizes Sutherland is the true spy, tasked by Major John André with securing access to the camp, but arrives too late to prevent Sackett’s murder. Sutherland escapes with stolen documents, including the name “Culper,” and Tallmadge angrily confronts Washington over his refusal to act sooner. In Setauket, Richard Woodhull warns Abraham Woodhull to abandon his deception of Major Hewlett or face scrutiny. Abe attempts to placate Hewlett and Richard by planting a fake Sons of Liberty dead drop in New York, but is caught by British soldiers and arrested. That night, Rogers ambushes and kills de Francy, recovers the intelligence, and realizes his vow of revenge. Simultaneously, Continental soldiers cross the Long Island Sound under the cover of night, capturing Major Hewlett from Whitehall in retaliation for the murder of a Continental officer committed by Simcoe and falsely attributed to him.
16	6	"Houses Divided"	Jeremy Webb	Michael Taylor & Craig Silverstein	May 11, 2015	0.741
Abraham Woodhull is imprisoned for treason in New York’s sugar house after being accused of rebel activity. The prison’s commander, Inspector Yates, informs Richard Woodhull that Abe claims to be spying for Major Hewlett, prompting Richard to accuse Mary Woodhull and Anna Strong of complicity. Richard orders Anna to leave Whitehall immediately. Anna secretly travels to Abe’s hidden spy cellar, where she uses invisible ink to warn Benjamin Tallmadge of Abe’s arrest and reveals that Abe has been posing as a double agent for Hewlett to gain safe passage to New York. In Whitehall, Mary pleads with Richard to help free Abe and confesses their involvement in Ensign Baker’s death and the burning of their home, but a shocked Richard refuses to involve himself further. At Valley Forge, Tallmadge learns that General George Washington has dismissed him as head of intelligence for allowing Abe to act independently. Believing Hewlett is the only person who can exonerate Abe, Tallmadge and Caleb Brewster decide to attempt a rescue themselves. Meanwhile, Yates pressures Abe to confess and falsely identifies him as a loyalist to other prisoners, resulting in Abe being brutally beaten. In Philadelphia, Major John André examines the documents his agent stole from Nathaniel Sackett. From a Culper report accurately describing the Royal Navy’s strength in New York, André deduces that the spy lives on Long Island and orders John Simcoe to hunt him down. André’s relationship with Peggy Shippen deepens, even as Peggy reveals she has corresponded with another man, later revealed to be Benedict Arnold. Abigail secretly receives Sackett’s toy boat, which contains coded instructions, and narrowly avoids its discovery after it is taken by the household staff. In Setauket, Anna confronts Simcoe at DeJong Tavern and rebuffs his advances, leading to a violent confrontation. Desperate to save Abe, Anna later apologizes and attempts to manipulate Simcoe into rescuing Hewlett, offering herself in exchange. Though Simcoe initially refuses, claiming he is not a monster, he later informs Anna that he will travel to Connecticut. As they depart, Simcoe reveals to Akinbode that his true intention is not to rescue Hewlett, but to kill him.
17	7	"Valley Forge"	Kimberly Peirce	Aïda Mashaka Croal	May 18, 2015	0.760
At Valley Forge, General George Washington is informed by his slave and valet, Billy Lee, that a courier bound for Connecticut must depart before midnight due to an approaching storm. Washington begins suffering hallucinations, including visions of his teeth falling out, and is examined by a doctor who diagnoses him with melancholia caused by deep moral conflict, warning that it may lead to madness. In private, Washington reveals to Billy that the source of his distress is a request from Lieutenant Chaffee, the officer holding Major Hewlett prisoner in Connecticut, seeking permission to execute Hewlett. Washington resolves to let the execution proceed unless he intervenes before the messenger departs. Through flashbacks, Hewlett is shown imprisoned in an outdoor stockade in Connecticut, stripped and exposed to brutal winter conditions while denying responsibility for the murder he has been accused of committing. Another flashback reveals Abraham Woodhull imprisoned in New York’s sugar house, where a fellow inmate attempts to coerce a confession for his own benefit, though Inspector Yates dismisses it as unsubstantiated. Washington puts Billy in a position of trust and confidence, asking him they treat each other as equals, and states that Hewlett is the only man who can clear Culper’s name. As they play cards, Washington reflects on his revered half-brother Lawrence, whose memory intensifies his turmoil. Billy suggests Washington may be overthinking the decision, provoking an angry outburst. Later, Washington reasons that Abe must still be alive, as he has not confessed, and Billy points out that Hewlett also refused to confess. In the stockade, Hewlett distracts himself by imagining conversations with Anna Strong and realizes that John Simcoe framed him for the murder. Lieutenant Chaffee later leaves Hewlett a knife, encouraging him to commit suicide. Richard Woodhull visits Abe in prison and informs him that Hewlett has been abducted and that Simcoe has returned to Setauket. Richard claims Anna now belongs to Simcoe and decides against helping Abe, believing prison may be safest for him. Abe vows to continue his mission regardless. After lashing out at Billy, Washington wanders through camp and into the forest in a conflicted stupor, where he hallucinates a conversation with Lawrence, who harshly challenges his military decisions but ultimately acknowledges Washington’s unique resolve, pointing to Washington’s forging of the Delaware and other strategic victories. Washington returns to camp, his melancholy overcome, and finally orders Hewlett’s execution stayed, proposing a prisoner exchange instead. He gifts Billy Lawrence’s pocket watch in gratitude for his insight and companionship. As the stay of execution is read by Lieutenant Chaffee, Simcoe and the Queen’s Rangers attack the Connecticut camp. Simcoe confronts Hewlett, who stabs him and escapes. A wounded Simcoe swears vengeance.
18	8	"Providence"	Michael Uppendahl	Andrew Colville	May 25, 2015	0.723
Benjamin Tallmadge and Caleb Brewster arrive at the Continental outpost in Connecticut, intending to rescue Major Hewlett, only to find the camp destroyed. Ben discovers a grave marked with Hewlett’s name, along with Washington’s letter granting Hewlett a pardon. Though Ben believes the mission has failed, Caleb vows to rescue Abraham Woodhull himself. In the woods, a wounded John Simcoe assumes Hewlett has died of exposure and prepares to move his men to Oyster Bay, in line with John André’s orders. Unbeknownst to him, Hewlett survives by hiding inside an animal carcass and eventually makes his way to the shoreline, where he persuades Robeson to smuggle him back to Setauket. At Valley Forge, Washington informs his generals of a plan to retake New York, citing intelligence from Culper reports that estimate British troop strength. A French officer confirms that King Louis is prepared to ally with the Americans, prompting celebration in camp. At the sugar house prison, Abe learns of the alliance and realizes its significance. Meanwhile, Washington promotes Benedict Arnold to commandant of Philadelphia, noting his injury prevents a return to combat, to Arnold’s dismay and outrage. Caleb returns to Nathaniel Sackett’s abandoned workshop and uses the Turtle, a one-man submarine prototype, to infiltrate New York Harbor. Though initially captured by British soldiers, Caleb detonates the Turtle’s explosives, escapes in the chaos, and disguises himself as a British officer. He gains access to Abe’s prison, but Abe refuses rescue, believing Washington’s pardon of Hewlett proves continued faith in the Culper Ring. Abe urges Caleb to recruit Robert Townsend as a New York–based agent. In Philadelphia, John André prepares for the British evacuation to New York and enlists Peggy Shippen to befriend Arnold as part of his plan to turn him. The two declare themselves married. André also receives the page of the King’s financial ledger recovered by Robert Rogers and orders it destroyed. Hewlett returns to Whitehall and moves to secure Abe’s release. In Setauket, Simcoe falsely claims Hewlett died in captivity, only for Hewlett to appear alive, leading to a tense standoff. At the customs house, Rogers survives an assassination attempt ordered by the Crown and abandons his Royal Messenger badge, severing his loyalty to the king.
19	9	"The Prodigal"	Eagle Egilsson	Michael Taylor	June 1, 2015	0.883
In Setauket, Cicero discovers the body of a Redcoat hanging from the gallows. Though a suicide note is found, Major Hewlett suspects foul play and implicitly accuses John Simcoe of staging the death. Simcoe barely denies the charge and issues a thinly veiled threat against Hewlett’s authority. Hewlett later tells Anna Strong that John André has invited Cicero to reunite with his mother, Abigail, in New York. Hewlett confides that Simcoe likely engineered both the Redcoat’s death and Hewlett’s earlier imprisonment. Anna proposes removing Akinbode, one of Simcoe’s key allies, a conversation overheard by Richard Woodhull. Anna arranges for Cicero to travel to New York under Akinbode’s escort. As a result of Hewlett’s intervention, Inspector Yates releases Abraham Woodhull from prison. Abe returns to Robert Townsend’s former boarding house and learns it has been sold, with no word left for Abe by Robert, except for his unpaid bill. Abe visits Townsend’s family farm in Oyster Bay, where Samuel Townsend reveals that Robert joined the Patriot cause after Simcoe’s men burned their stables. Abe realizes Townsend wrote him a message in invisible ink on the bill. In Philadelphia, Benedict Arnold intervenes when Peggy Shippen and her father are attacked by a Patriot mob, introducing himself to Judge Shippen. At Valley Forge, General Charles Lee apologizes to George Washington and endorses an aggressive military plan, leading Washington to grant Lee significant command authority. Billy Lee warns Benjamin Tallmadge that General Lee has deceived Washington. Ben later offers his dragoons to General Lee, placing himself under Lee’s command. Back in Setauket, Simcoe delays Abe’s attempt to read Townsend’s message. Abe reunites with Mary and Thomas, telling Mary he plans to stop spying, though she doubts him. Simcoe later asks Akinbode to spy on Abe, but grants him leave to escort Cicero to New York. During a tense parley, Simcoe admits to killing Hewlett’s horse and shooting Richard, but Hewlett refuses to resign, predicting Simcoe’s self-destruction. That night, Abe and Anna secretly meet in the spy cave and decode Townsend’s message, revealing he has purchased a coffeehouse frequented by British officers and uncovered a plot against Washington. Simcoe’s rangers discover them and force Abe to lead them to Caleb Brewster. Anna stabs one ranger while Caleb and Abe kill the other. Abe orders Caleb to dump the bodies and sends Townsend’s intelligence to Washington, unaware they are being watched by an unseen observer.
20	10	"Gunpowder, Treason, and Plot"	Jeremy Webb	Craig Silverstein	June 8, 2015	0.933
In Setauket, Anna Strong incites a brawl between Major Hewlett’s Redcoats and John Simcoe’s Queen’s Rangers at DeJong Tavern, allowing Hewlett to order Simcoe and his men out of town. Simcoe departs for New Jersey at the summons of John André, vowing to return. There, André persuades General Clinton to expose the British retreat just enough to lure the Continental Army into an ambush, exploiting the fact that the compromised General Charles Lee commands half of Washington’s forces. Lee leads his troops into battle, assuring them of an overwhelming numerical advantage. Benjamin Tallmadge grows suspicious of Lee’s intelligence but is ordered to lead the charge. At Whitehall, Hewlett instructs Abraham Woodhull to compile a final spy report intended for André, hoping it will end Simcoe’s investigation. Richard urges Abe to flee, warning that André will see through the deception. Abe considers assassinating Hewlett to stop the report, but Anna refuses to help. Mary instead proposes killing Corporal Eastin and framing Simcoe, while forging André’s response to dismiss Hewlett’s claims. In New Jersey, Lee’s forces are ambushed, confirming Ben’s fears. Caleb Brewster arrives with intelligence from Robert Townsend warning of a plot against Washington. As Lee orders a retreat, Washington arrives with reinforcements, confronts Lee, and personally leads the counterattack, securing a Patriot victory while Clinton and André look on in frustration. Later, at the Continental camp, Ben and Caleb expose a conspiracy involving one of Lee’s officers and Washington’s guard, Thomas Hickey, both of whom are captured before an assassination attempt can be carried out. Washington reveals he had prior knowledge of Lee’s treachery through intelligence from Agent 355, Abigail. Elsewhere, Peggy Shippen’s engagement to Benedict Arnold deepens under coercive circumstances, while André drunkenly reveals to Abigail his intention to turn Arnold against the Patriots. Meanwhile, Akinbode reunites with Abigail and urges her to flee to the freedom of Canada with Cicero and him, though she refuses. Back in Setauket, Abe kills Eastin to prevent the spy report from reaching André, but is abducted by Robert Rogers, who holds Abe captive in the spy cave, revealing he knows the identities of the Culper Ring and intends to use Abe to ensnare André in a final act of revenge.

=== Season 3 (2016) ===
No. overall	No. in season	Title	Directed by	Written by	Original release date	US viewers (millions)
21	1	"Valediction"	Michael Nankin	Craig Silverstein	April 25, 2016	0.471
Abe covers up a murder with help from Rogers. Mary helps Abe execute the scheme to continue to spy. Elsewhere, Benedict Arnold abuses his power as he settles into a new home in Philadelphia. The episode ends with Richard informing Hewlett that Abe is a spy for the Continental Army.
22	2	"Cold Murdering Bastards"	Keith Boak	Michael Taylor	May 2, 2016	0.458
Hewlett confronts Abe after Richard's disclosure to Hewlett. Hewlett demands the names of the coconspirators. Abe convinces Hewlett that hanging Abe would lead to Hewlett looking the fool and Abe returns to his farm with Thomas. Mary agrees to be Hewlett's hostage so that Abe can be set free. Townsend sends. a signal that he has information to pass along. Rogers meets with Townsend Sr who passes along a Bible with hidden information. Rogers goes to Oyster Bay after receiving Townsend's signal instead of Abe because of the situation with Hewlett. Simcoe returns and finds the British regulars tormenting one of his Rangers sop Simcoe takes hostages and threatens Hewlett. Anna tries to save the ring after Abe's cover is blown; and Benedict Arnold seeks Washington's help against charges of treason which are levied as a result of Arnold's acquisition of funds, goods and property. Washington suggests that Arnold submit himself to a Court Martial to end the rumors of his lavish lifestyle at the expense of Congress.
23	3	"Benediction"	Jeremy Webb	LaToya Morgan	May 9, 2016	0.580
Peggy manipulates Benedict Arnold into contacting the British. Caleb sets an ambush for Simcoe. Meanwhile, Anna tries to save Major Hewlett's life.
24	4	"Hearts and Minds"	Deborah Chow	Michael Taylor	May 16, 2016	0.504
Ben is rescued by a mysterious woman. Abe tries to stop Anna from marrying Hewlett. Benedict Arnold begins negotiations with the British.
25	5	"Hypocrisy, Fraud, and Tyranny"	Keith Boak	Libby Friz	May 23, 2016	0.603
Townsend uncovers a British counterfeiting operation. Rogers threatens to destroy Abe's spying ring. Meanwhile, Simcoe threatens Richard.
26	6	"Many Mickles Make a Muckle"	Marvin Rush	Mitchell Akselrad	May 30, 2016	0.591
Washington attends Benedict Arnold's ball in Philadelphia. Abe races to stop Rogers before he reaches Townsend. Meanwhile, old friends and enemies intersect.
27	7	"Judgment"	Omar Madha	Scott Gunnison Miller	June 6, 2016	0.599
Mary tries to kill Simcoe on her own, wounding him in the ear. Benedict Arnold defends himself in his own court-martial. Meanwhile, Ben reunites with the woman who saved his life.
28	8	"Mended"	Kate Dennis	Andrew Colville	June 13, 2016	0.572
The Culper Ring is resurrected in time to save Washington's army. Simcoe terrorizes Setauket as he hunts for Rogers. Meanwhile, Anna infiltrates New York.
29	9	"Blade on the Feather"	Jeremy Webb	Alexander Rose	June 20, 2016	0.614
Benedict Arnold plots to turn over West Point to the British. Andre negotiates for Peggy. Meanwhile, Abe plots revolt in Setauket.
30	10	"Trial and Execution"	Andrew McCarthy	Craig Silverstein	June 27, 2016	0.665
A march to the gallows for the captured spies on both sides. Meanwhile, Benedict Arnold demands glory revenge.

=== Season 4 (2017) ===
No. overall	No. in season	Title	Directed by	Written by	Original release date	US viewers (millions)
31	1	"Spyhunter General"	Craig Silverstein	Craig Silverstein	June 17, 2017	0.664
Benedict Arnold rounds up spies in New York. Abe plots to destroy essential British supplies, but he will need his father's help.
32	2	"The Black Hole of Calcutta"	Andrew McCarthy	Michael Taylor	June 17, 2017	0.541
When one of the Culper Ring members is captured, Arnold seeks to interrogate him - with the help of a ruthless Colonel Simcoe.
33	3	"Blood for Blood"	Keith Boak	Scott Gunnison Miller	June 24, 2017	0.651
Abe's scheme to rescue Caleb turns deadly. Anna faces a difficult decision. Arnold suspects Peggy is keeping a secret from him.
34	4	"Nightmare"	Jeremy Webb	Mitchell Akselrad	July 1, 2017	0.676
Amidst a growing rebellion in camp, the Culper Ring must chart a new course. Arnold finds an unlikely ally. Rivington teaches Townsend a lesson.
35	5	"Private Woodhull"	Henry Bronchtein	Andrew Colville	July 8, 2017	0.637
Seeking revenge against Simcoe, Abe travels to New York and meets Benedict Arnold. Meanwhile, a visitor from Anna's past comes to the continental camp.
36	6	"Our Man in New York"	Eagle Egilsson	Alexander Rose	July 15, 2017	0.603
The plot to kidnap Benedict Arnold is hatched. Peggy learns Cicero's secret. General Washington and the French clash over strategy.
37	7	"Quarry"	Omar Madha	Libby Friz	July 22, 2017	0.545
Ben's plan to kidnap Benedict Arnold conflicts with Abe's plot to kill Simcoe and shifting loyalties turn old enemies into allies.
38	8	"Belly of the Beast"	Nick Copus	Mitchell Akselrad	July 29, 2017	0.597
Abe settles his score with Simcoe. Ben makes a passionate appeal to Washington. Caleb seeks redemption.
39	9	"Reckoning"	Eagle Egilsson	LaToya Morgan	August 5, 2017	0.643
Washington heads south to lay siege to Yorktown but must convince Clinton he is heading to New York. Abraham joins the Continental Army. Peggy goes into labor.
40	10	"Washington's Spies"	Jeremy Webb	Craig Silverstein & Michael Taylor	August 12, 2017	0.746
The fate of the Culper ring is revealed. The war for American independence ends with the British Evacuation of New York City and America struggles to begin.

== Ratings ==
Turn: Washington's Spies : U.S. viewers per episode (millions)

Season	Episode number									
Season	1	2	3	4	5	6	7	8	9	10
1	2.12	1.87	1.40	1.30	1.24	1.08	1.09	1.39	1.17	1.61
2	0.83	0.83	0.87	0.59	0.63	0.74	0.76	0.72	0.88	0.93
3	0.47	0.46	0.58	0.50	0.60	0.59	0.60	0.57	0.61	0.67
4	0.66	0.54	0.65	0.68	0.64	0.60	0.55	0.60	0.64	0.75

Audience measurement performed by Nielsen Media Research
