= The Murder of Stephen Lawrence =

1999 British television film

- Genre: True crime
- Written by: Paul Greengrass
- Directed by: Paul Greengrass
- Starring: Marianne Jean-Baptiste; Hugh Quarshie; Leon Black; Ashley Walters; Millicent Gezi; Joseph Kpobie; Brian Bovell; Jo Martin
- Country of origin: United Kingdom
- Original language: English

Production
- Executive producers: Jeff Pope; Yvette Vanson
- Producer: Mark Redhead
- Cinematography: Ivan Strasburg
- Editor: Clare Douglas
- Running time: 120 minutes
- Production companies: Granada Television, Vanson Productions

Original release
- Network: ITV
- Release: 18 February 1999

The Murder of Stephen Lawrence is a British television true crime drama film, written and directed by Paul Greengrass, that first broadcast on ITV on 18 February 1999. It won the BAFTA TV Award for Best Single Drama.

The film, based on the murder committed on 22 April 1993, follows Stephen's parents' Doreen and Neville's quest for justice as a gang of racist teenagers are tried for their son's murder. Marianne Jean-Baptiste and Hugh Quarshie star as Doreen and Neville, with Leon Black playing Stephen, and Ashley Walters, Millicent Gezi, Joseph Kpobie and Brian Bovell also amongst the main cast.

== Production ==
The film was first conceived in 1997, with then head of drama at ITV, Nick Elliott, commissioning the project before a script had even been written. Producer Mark Readhead said a key part of the film was to "concentrate on the personal, rather than police, procedures", in order to create a "true story". The film was notable for being actress Jean-Baptiste's first British screen role since her Oscar nomination for Secrets and Lies.

== Cast ==
- Marianne Jean-Baptiste as Doreen Lawrence
- Hugh Quarshie as Neville Lawrence
- Leon Black as Stephen Lawrence
- Ashley Walters as Stuart Lawrence
- Millicent Gezi as Georgina Lawrence
- Joseph Kpobie as Duwayne Brooks
- Brian Bovell as Uncle
- Jo Martin as Cheryl Sloley
- Shaun Chawdhary as Imran Khan
- Kenneth Cranham as Michael Mansfield QC
- David Calder as Sir Paul Condon
- Stafford Gordon as DAC Ian Johnston
- Michael Feast as DCS Ilsley
- David Schaal as DS Bevan
- Jenny Tarren as WDC Holden
- Natasha Williams as Clara
- Dona Croll as Ros Howells OBE
- Ricci Harnett as Neil Acourt
- Lee Colley as Jamie Acourt
- Darren Morfitt as Luke Knight
- Neil Maskell as Gary Dobson
- Dominic Power as David Norris

== Home media ==
The film was released on VHS in the United States on 23 April 2002, but this remains the only home release.

== Legacy and sequel ==
In the wake of various Black Lives Matter protests, and as part of ITV's "Black Voices" strand, the drama was repeated on ITV in July 2020, immediately after an hour-long debate programme titled Stephen Lawrence: Has Britain Changed?

In July 2020, it was announced that a new, three-part sequel to the 1999 drama had been commissioned by ITV. The series will be set 13 years after Lawrence's death and will depict his parents’ fight for justice. The series, entitled Stephen was broadcast from 30 August to 13 September 2021.
