= The Swap (2016 film) =

2016 American television teen film

- Film poster
- Based on: The Swap by Megan Shull
- Written by: Charlie Shahnaian; Shari Simpson
- Directed by: Jay Karas
- Starring: Peyton List; Jacob Bertrand
- Country of origin: United States
- Original language: English

Production
- Executive producers: Fernando Szew; Robyn Snyder; Gaylyn Fraiche; Kim Todd; Nicholas Hirst; Sean McNamara
- Producer: Ric Nish
- Cinematography: David A. Makin
- Editor: Duncan Christie
- Running time: 89 minutes
- Production company: MarVista Entertainment

Original release
- Network: Disney Channel
- Release: October 7, 2016

The Swap is a 2016 American television teen comedy film that premiered on Disney Channel as a part of the network's annual "Monstober" event on October 7, 2016. The film is based on the young adult novel of the same name written by Megan Shull and is written by Charlie Shahnaian and Shari Simpson and directed by Jay Karas. The movie stars Peyton List and Jacob Bertrand.

== Plot ==
High school sophomores Jack Malloy and Ellie O'Brien are going through hard times. Jack's mother has recently died, leaving him with his roughhousing older brothers and cold seemingly heartless dad, who puts pressure on his sons to be macho men, with all fighting and no crying. Ellie's own dad has walked out on her and her "helicopter" mom, and her best friend since kindergarten, Sassy, has started ignoring her in favor of the more feminine yet nastier new girl, Aspen. Jack and Ellie have big sports events coming up over the weekend. Jack is trying out for the varsity hockey team but has to deal with the bullying Porter, who has always lost the last spot on varsity to one of Jack's brothers. Ellie's rhythmic gymnastics team has to win big at the upcoming tournament, or budgets cuts at school will have it demoted from "team" to "club".

On Friday, they both end up in the nurse's office, after Jack is hurt in a scuffle with Porter, and Ellie starts crying after hearing Aspen say mean things about her to Sassy behind her back. They start fighting, with Ellie saying boys have it better than girls by not having to deal with friend drama, but Jack says girls have it easier because they can be as emotional as they want. The tired nurse gets them to continue their fighting via text, and they text each other on how they wished they had each other's lives. Suddenly, magic lightning strikes and knocks them out, and when they get up, they realize that they have swapped bodies. Ellie remembers something her mom said about how "investing too much emotional energy into an object gives it power over you." In this case, their respective cell phones, which they cherished because each had once belonged to their now absent parent, are magical totems that had the power to grant their texted wish. After failing to swap back, they decide to look for a book belonging to Ellie's mom to reverse the spell. However, they find out their time is limited since Ellie's dad will be canceling their family phone plan, starting on Sunday.

Trying to keep the swap a secret from their parents and schoolmates, Ellie and Jack struggle to maintain their respective lives in each other's bodies.

== Cast ==
- Peyton List as Ellie O'Brien, a girl who likes rhythm gymnastics and switches places with Jack
- Jacob Bertrand as Jack Malloy, a boy who likes hockey and switches places with Ellie
- Darrin Rose as Coach Malloy, Jack's strict widowed father and hockey coach
- Claire Rankin as Summer O'Brien, Ellie's divorced mother and yoga instructor
- Callan Potter as Gunner Malloy, one of Jack's older twin brothers
- Jesse Bostick as Stryker Malloy, one of Jack's older twin brothers
- Eliana Jones as Aspen Bishop, the new girl in town and Sassy's new best friend
- Kiana Madeira as Sassy Gaines, a snobby girl who likes Aspen and Ellie's former best friend
- Kolton Stewart as Owen Keller, Jack's best friend and employee at Sportsplex who knows about Jack and Ellie's magical switch
- James Godfrey as Porter Gibbs, Jack's hockey tormentor who later became his friend
- Devyn Nekoda as Mackenzie Wick, a member of the school's STEM club and Ellie's new friend and later Jack's girlfriend
- Naomi Snieckus as Coach Carol, the head coach of rhythm gymnastics
- Linda Kash as Nurse Helen
- Naya Liviah as Claire Olakanday, Ellie's new friend along with Mackenzie
- Michael Fessaha as Ryan Morgan, a texter at school and a player on the hockey team
- Marcia Johnson as Dr. Baker
- Valerie Descheneaux as Stylist
- Danny Smith as Clerk
- Mark Hickox as Badminton Coach

== Ratings ==
During its premiere in the 8:00 PM time slot, The Swap attracted a total of 2.64 million viewers with a 0.48 rating for people aged 18–49.

== See also ==
- List of films about ice hockey
