= Bull (2000 TV series) =

American drama television series

- Genre: Drama
- Created by: Michael S. Chernuchin
- Starring: Alicia Coppola; Stanley Tucci; Andrea Roth; Elisabeth Röhm; Ian Kahn; Donald Moffat; George Newbern; Malik Yoba
- Composer: Mark Snow
- Country of origin: United States
- Original language: English
- No. of seasons: 1
- No. of episodes: 20 (8 unaired)

Production
- Executive producers: Ken Horton; Michael S. Chernuchin; Eric Laneuville
- Running time: 60 minutes
- Production companies: Michael S. Chernuchin Productions; Warner Bros. Television

Original release
- Network: TNT
- Release: August 15, 2000 – January 31, 2001

Bull is an American drama series created by Michael S. Chernuchin that aired on TNT from August 15, 2000, to January 31, 2001. The show's name is in reference to the bull market, but the airing of the series coincided with the dot-com bubble crash that turned what had until then been a bull economy in the United States into a bear market. In February 2001, the series was cancelled after airing 12 of the planned 20 episodes.

== Synopsis ==
Bull is about a group of Wall Street investment bankers who risk everything to break away from an established firm and start their own company. Leading the way is Robert "Ditto" Roberts III, the brilliant grandson of the founder of their former company who must betray his family heritage in order to stake a claim to his own life. His partners—Corey Granville, Marty Decker, Carson Boyd, Alison Jeffers and Marissa Rufo—each with a separate agenda, risk losing everything to join him in the new rival start-up firm that will answer the call of the new economy. With no financing, no clients and the rivalry of every player in town, the team's dreams rest on Hunter Lasky, the hard-hitting negotiations shark who has the potential to give the renegade team of Wall Street brokers the edge and legitimacy they need to succeed in the competitive world of high finance.

== Cast ==
=== Main ===
- Alicia Coppola as Marissa Rufo
- Ian Kahn as Marty Decker
- Donald Moffat as Robert Roberts
- George Newbern as Robert Roberts III
- Ryan O'Neal as Robert Roberts II
- Elisabeth Röhm as Alison Jeffers
- Stanley Tucci as Hunter Lasky
- Christopher Wiehl as Carson Boyd
- Malik Yoba as Corey Granville

=== Recurring ===
- Frederick Koehler as Joey Rutigliano
- Nina Foch as Madeline Roberts

== Episodes ==
No.	Title	Directed by	Written by	Original release date
1	"In the Course of Human Events"	Stephen Surjik	Michael S. Chernuchin	August 15, 2000
2	"One Night in Bangkok"	Thomas J. Wright	Michael S. Chernuchin	August 22, 2000
3	"How Green Is Your Mail?"	Elodie Keene	Michael S. Chernuchin	August 29, 2000
4	"In the Black"	Allan Arkush	Doug Palau	September 5, 2000
5	"It's Not Personal"	Adam Nimoy	Gay Walch	September 12, 2000
6	"Who's Afraid of Chairman Al?"	Steven Robman	Michael S. Chernuchin	September 19, 2000
7	"Final Hour"	Thomas J. Wright	Janis Diamond	September 26, 2000
8	"Sins of the Father"	Keith Samples	Timothy J. Lea	October 3, 2000
9	"The Quick Hit"	Vern Gillum	Janis Diamond	October 10, 2000
10	"Monday, Bloody Monday"	Eric Laneuville	Doug Palau	October 17, 2000
11	"A Wink and a Nod"	Adam Nimoy	Gay Walch	October 24, 2000
12	"Blood, Flopsweat and Tears"	Stephen Surjik	Unknown	January 31, 2001
13	"What the Past Will Bring"	TBD	TBD	Unaired
14	"Visit"	TBD	TBD	Unaired
15	"Appearance of Impropriety"	TBD	TBD	Unaired
16	"White Knight"	TBD	TBD	Unaired
17	"Love's Labor Lost"	TBD	TBD	Unaired
18	"Amen"	TBD	TBD	Unaired
19	"To Have and to Hold"	TBD	TBD	Unaired
20	"A Beautiful Lie"	TBD	TBD	Unaired

== Production ==
Michael S. Chernuchin was the series creator, executive producer and show runner. Eric Laneuville and Ken Horton were also executive producers for the series. Doug Palau was a supervising producer and writer. Palau had previously worked with Chernuchin on Brooklyn South.
