= Washington's Spies =

2006 American history book by Alexander Rose

Washington's Spies: The Story of America's First Spy Ring
- Author: Alexander Rose
- Language: English
- Genre: Non-fiction
- Publisher: Bantam Books
- Publication date: April 25, 2006
- Publication place: United States
- Media type: Print (hardcover and paperback)
- Pages: 384 pp (first edition)
- ISBN: 978-0-553-80421-8

Washington's Spies: The Story of America's First Spy Ring (2006) is a history book by Alexander Rose, based on the stories of four real-life childhood friends who formed the Culper spy ring that affected the course of the Revolutionary War. In an interview with the National Review, Rose stated he used the website of the Library of Congress to research the letters by George Washington and those in the Culper Ring, as well as newspapers from the period and various writings left by those involved.

The book was adapted into the AMC period drama series, Turn: Washington's Spies, which premiered April 6, 2014. The series stars Jamie Bell as Abraham Woodhull, Seth Numrich as Benjamin Tallmadge, Daniel Henshall as Caleb Brewster and Heather Lind as Anna Strong, with Ian Kahn as George Washington.

The Chicago Tribune called the book "fascinating."
