= Turn: Washington's Spies =

American historical drama TV series

- Genre: Historical drama
- Based on: Washington's Spies: The Story of America's First Spy Ring by Alexander Rose
- Developed by: Craig Silverstein
- Starring: Jamie Bell; Seth Numrich; Daniel Henshall; Heather Lind; Meegan Warner; Burn Gorman; Samuel Roukin; Kevin R. McNally; Angus Macfadyen; JJ Feild; Ksenia Solo; Ian Kahn; Owain Yeoman; Nick Westrate
- Opening theme: "Hush" performed by Joy Williams, Matt Berninger, and Charlie Peacock
- Composers: Marco Beltrami; Brandon Roberts
- Country of origin: United States
- Original language: English
- No. of seasons: 4
- No. of episodes: 40 (list of episodes)

Production
- Executive producers: Henry Bronchtein; Andrew Colville; Michael Taylor; Barry Josephson; Craig Silverstein
- Producers: Larry Rapaport; Mitchell Amstrad; LaToya Morgan; Alexander Rose
- Production locations: Richmond, Virginia, Williamsburg, Virginia, Yorktown, Virginia, Petersburg, Virginia
- Cinematography: Lol Crawley ("Pilot"); Marvin V. Rush; Scott Peck
- Editors: Andrew Seklir; Harry B. Miller III; David Lebowitz; Ian E. Silverstein
- Running time: 41–47 minutes 54 minutes ("Washington's Spies"); 64 minutes ("Pilot")
- Production companies: AMC Studios; Sesfonstein Productions; Josephson Entertainment

Original release
- Network: AMC
- Release: April 6, 2014 – August 12, 2017

Turn: Washington's Spies (originally titled Turn and stylized as TURИ: Washington's Spies) is an American period drama television series based on Alexander Rose's book Washington's Spies: The Story of America's First Spy Ring (2007), a history of the Culper Ring. The series originally aired on the AMC network for four seasons, from April 6, 2014, to August 12, 2017.

== Plot ==
The story covers events from 1776 to 1781 and features a farmer from Setauket, New York and his childhood friends. They form an unlikely group of spies called the Culper Ring, which eventually helps to turn the tide during the American Revolutionary War. The series begins in October 1776, shortly after British victories, recapturing of Long Island and the Port of New York for the Crown, leaving General George Washington's army in dire straits. The first episode opens with the following introductory text:

Autumn 1776. Insurgents have declared war against the Crown. Following a successful naval landing, His Majesty's Army has forced Washington's rebels into the wilderness. New York City serves as a military base of operations for the British. The Loyalists of nearby Long Island keep vigilant watch out for sympathizers and spies.

== Cast ==
=== Main cast ===
- Jamie Bell as Abraham Woodhull
- Seth Numrich as Captain Benjamin Tallmadge
- Daniel Henshall as Lieutenant Caleb Brewster
- Heather Lind as Anna Strong
- Meegan Warner as Mary Woodhull
- Burn Gorman as Major Edmund Hewlett (based on Richard Hewlett)
- Samuel Roukin as Captain John Graves Simcoe
- Kevin R. McNally as Judge Richard Woodhull
- Angus Macfadyen as Major Robert Rogers (seasons 1–3; special appearance 4)
- JJ Feild as Major John André (seasons 1–3)
- Ksenia Solo as Peggy Shippen (seasons 2–4)
- Ian Kahn as General George Washington (recurring season 1, main seasons 2–4)
- Owain Yeoman as General Benedict Arnold (seasons 2–4)
- Nick Westrate as Robert Townsend (recurring season 2, main seasons 3–4)

=== Recurring cast ===
- Idara Victor as Abigail, code named Agent 355
- Darren Alford as Cicero
- Andrew McKeough as John Carter
- Talmadge Ragan as Woman in Crowd
- Robert Beitzel as Selah Strong (seasons 1, 4)
- Jonny Coyne as Colonel Jonathan Cooke (seasons 1, 3–4)
- Brian T. Finney as General Charles Lee (seasons 1–2)
- David Furr as Walter Havens (seasons 1, 4)
- Michael Gaston as General Charles Scott (season 1)
- Amy Gumenick as Philomena Cheer (season 1, season 3–4)
- Jamie Harris as John Robeson (seasons 1–3)
- Aldis Hodge as Jordan/Akinbode (seasons 1–2, 4)
- Thomas Keegan as Ensign Baker (season 1)
- Alex Miller as Colonel Joseph Reed (seasons 1–2)
- Taylor Roberts as Rachel Clark (seasons 1–2)
- Melissa Charles as Lydia Ketcham (seasons 1–3)
- Stephen Root as Nathaniel Sackett (seasons 1–2)
- Gentry White as William Lee (seasons 2–3)
- John Billingsley as Samuel Townsend (seasons 2–3)
- Ralph Brown as General Henry Clinton (seasons 2–4)
- Stuart Greer as Officer Yates (season 2)
- Josh Price as Freddy Morgan (seasons 2–4)
- Brian Wiles as Marquis de Lafayette (seasons 2–4)
- Lilli Birdsell as Martha Washington (seasons 3–4)
- John Carroll Lynch as James Rivington (seasons 3–4)
- Sean Haggerty as Colonel Alexander Hamilton (seasons 3–4)
- Adam J. Harrington as Lieutenant Gamble (seasons 2–3)
- Edward Akrout as Amos Parker (season 4)
- Kelly AuCoin as Hercules Mulligan (season 4)
- Chris Webster as John Champe (season 4)
- Dylan Saunders as Joseph Sturridge (season 4)
- Mark Halpern as Lieutenant Appleton (seasons 1, 4)
- Laura Meakin as Hesther Carney (season 4)
- Ashley Smith as Lieutenant/Captain Wakefield (Seasons 1-4)

== Episodes ==
Season	Episodes	Originally released	
Season	Episodes	First released	Last released
1	10	April 6, 2014	June 8, 2014
2	10	April 13, 2015	June 8, 2015
3	10	April 25, 2016	June 27, 2016
4	10	June 17, 2017	August 12, 2017

== Production ==
Turn: Washington's Spies was renewed for a second 10-episode season on June 23, 2014, which premiered on April 13, 2015, and for a third 10-episode season on July 15, 2015, which premiered on April 25, 2016. On July 26, 2016, Turn: Washington's Spies was renewed for a fourth and final 10-episode season, which had a two-hour premiere on June 17, 2017.

== Reception ==
=== Critical response ===
Critical response of Turn: Washington's Spies
Season	Rotten Tomatoes	Metacritic
1	54% (39 reviews)	62 (35 reviews)
2	90% (10 reviews)	68 (4 reviews)
3	100% (5 reviews)	—N/a
4	80% (5 reviews)	—N/a

The first season of Turn: Washington's Spies received mixed reviews. Review aggregator Rotten Tomatoes rated the season 54%, based on 39 reviews, with an average rating of 6.30/10. The site's consensus reads, "Turn's uneven treatment of the American Revolution is more frustrating than exciting and memorable." On Metacritic, the first season scored 62 out of 100, based on reviews from 35 critics, indicating "generally favorable reviews".

The second season received positive reviews. On Rotten Tomatoes, the season has an approval rating of 90%, based on 10 reviews, with an average rating of 7.40/10. The website's critics consensus reads: "The revolution gains steam in an improved second season that delivers on the series' promise of espionage thrills along with an expanded historical grandeur." On Metacritic, the season has a weighted average score of 68 out of 100, based on reviews from 4 critics, indicating "generally favorable reviews".

On Rotten Tomatoes, the third season has a rating of 100%, based on 5 reviews, with an average rating of 8.00/10 and the fourth season has a rating of 80% based on 5 reviews, with an average rating of 7.60/10.

=== Awards and nominations ===
The first season of TURN: Washington's Spies was awarded the 2014 Media & Entertainment Award by the Daughters of the American Revolution.

Year	Award	Category	Recipient(s)	Episode(s)	Result
2014	Media & Entertainment Award	—	—	—	Won
2015	Location Managers Guild Awards	Outstanding Locations in Period Television	Tom Trigo and Becky Beckstoffer	—	Nominated
2016	Golden Reel Award	Best Sound Editing - Short Form Sound Effects and Foley in Television	George Haddad, Chad J. Hughes, Angelo Palazzo, Darrin Mann, Gregg Baxter, Catherine Harper, and Matthew Thomas Hall	"Gunpowder, Treason and Plot"	Nominated
2016	NAACP Image Award	Outstanding Writing in a Dramatic Series	LaToya Morgan	"False Flag"	Nominated
2016	SXSW Film Festival	Excellence in Title Design	Michael Riley, Bob Swensen, Aaron Bjork, and Eddie Moreno	—	Nominated
2017	NAACP Image Award	Outstanding Writing in a Dramatic Series	LaToya Morgan	"Benediction"	Nominated

== Home media ==
The first season of TURN: Washington's Spies was released on DVD and Blu-ray on March 17, 2015 by Starz Entertainment; it became available on Netflix on March 25, 2015. The second season was released on DVD on March 22, 2016 and became available on Netflix on April 11, 2016. The third season was released on DVD on November 8, 2016. and became available on Netflix on June 4, 2017. The fourth season became available on Netflix on December 1, 2017. The series departed Netflix after four years in December 2021. The series became available on Netflix in December 2025. The fourth season still has not been released on DVD and Blu-ray. A Complete Series (Season 1-4) box set has yet to be released in the US.

== Comics ==
On March 26, 2014, AMC released the digital comic TURN: Origins, illustrated by Steve Ellis, that portrays childhood and adulthood events from the lives of several of the series' main characters, including Abraham Woodhull, Benjamin Tallmadge, Anna Strong, and Caleb Brewster.

On April 10 and April 15, 2015, AMC released the first and second chapters, respectively, of a second digital comic, TURN: Rivals, that portrays the past rivalry of George Washington and Robert Rogers.

== See also ==
- List of television series and miniseries about the American Revolution
- List of films about the American Revolution
