= Marianne Jean-Baptiste =

British actress (born 1967)

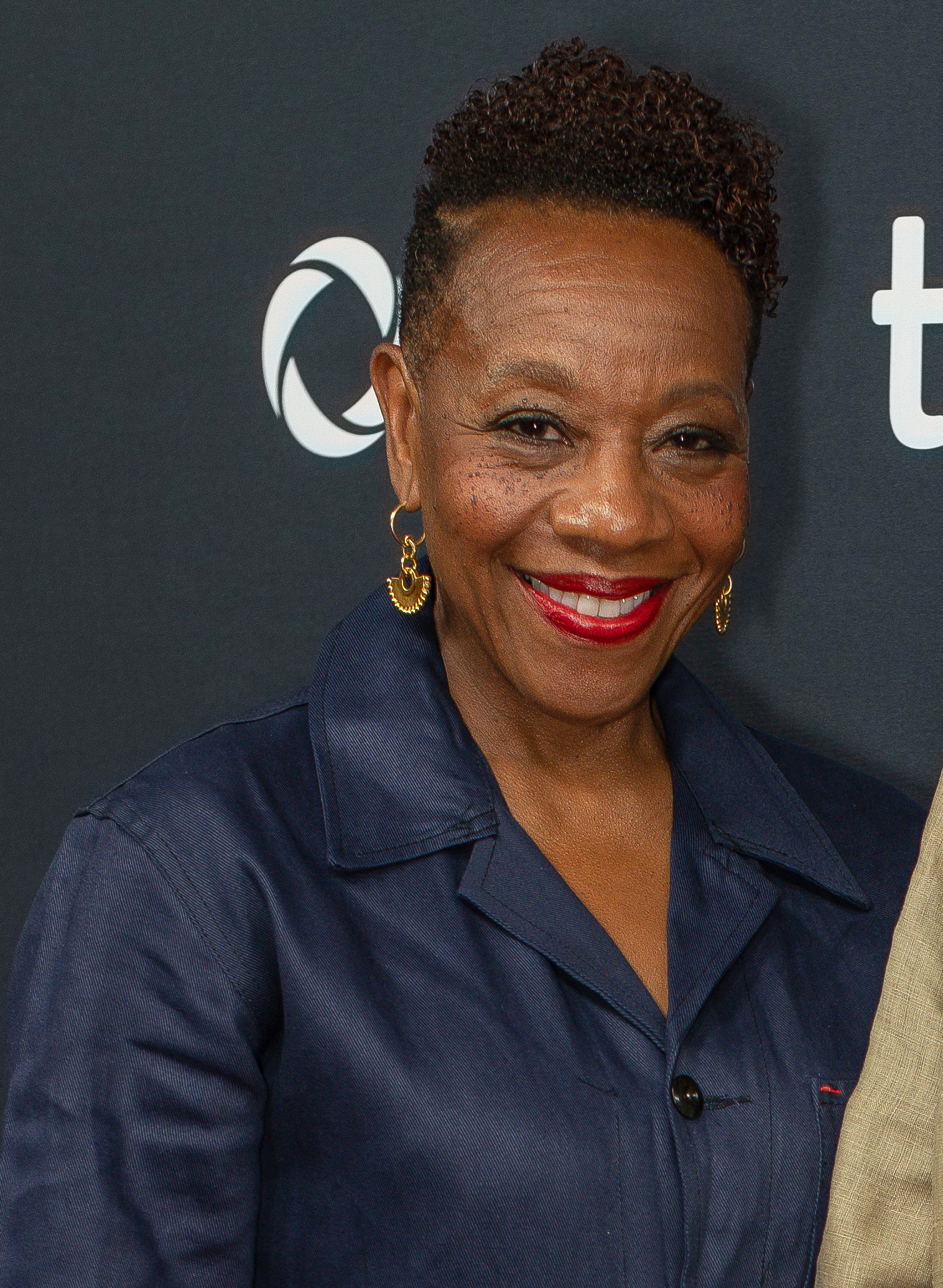
- Jean-Baptiste at the 2024 Toronto International Film Festival
- Born: Marianne Raigipcien Jean-Baptiste; April 26, 1967 (age 59); Camberwell, London, England
- Education: Royal Academy of Dramatic Art; Barking and Dagenham College
- Occupations: Actress; director
- Years active: 1991–present
- Spouse: Evan Williams (m. 1997)
- Children: 3

Marianne Raigipcien Jean-Baptiste (born April 26, 1967) is an English actress and director. She is known for her role in Mike Leigh's drama film Secrets & Lies (1996), for which she received acclaim and earned nominations for the Academy Award, BAFTA Award, and Golden Globe for Best Supporting Actress.

Jean-Baptiste is known for her role as Vivian Johnson on the television series Without a Trace (2002–2009) and has also starred in multiple television shows such as Blindspot (2015–2016) and Homecoming (2018). She gained renewed recognition for starring as a depressed woman in Leigh's drama film Hard Truths (2024), for which she received a nomination for the BAFTA Award for Best Actress in a Leading Role.

== Early life and education ==
Marianne Raigipcien Jean-Baptiste was born in London to a mother from Antigua and a father from Saint Lucia, growing up in Peckham.

She attended St Saviour's and St Olave's secondary school. She was classically trained at the Royal Academy of Dramatic Art in London.

== Career ==
Jean-Baptiste gained international acclaim for the Mike Leigh-directed drama Secrets & Lies (1996), receiving both Golden Globe and Academy Award for Best Supporting Actress nominations for her performance, becoming the first black British actress to be nominated for an Academy Award and the second black Briton to be nominated, succeeding Jaye Davidson. She had previously collaborated with Leigh onstage in It's a Great Big Shame! (1993). She caused controversy when she accused the film industry of racism, noting that leading actors had been asked to attend the Cannes Film Festival, but despite her success, she was not invited.

A writer and composer, Jean-Baptiste recorded an album of blues songs and composed the musical score for Leigh's 1997 film Career Girls. In 1999, she performed in Paris in a French-language production by Peter Brook of The Suit (Le Costume), a one-act play by Barney Simon and Mothobi Mutloatse, based on the short story by Can Themba. She was also acclaimed for her role as Doreen Lawrence in The Murder of Stephen Lawrence (1999).

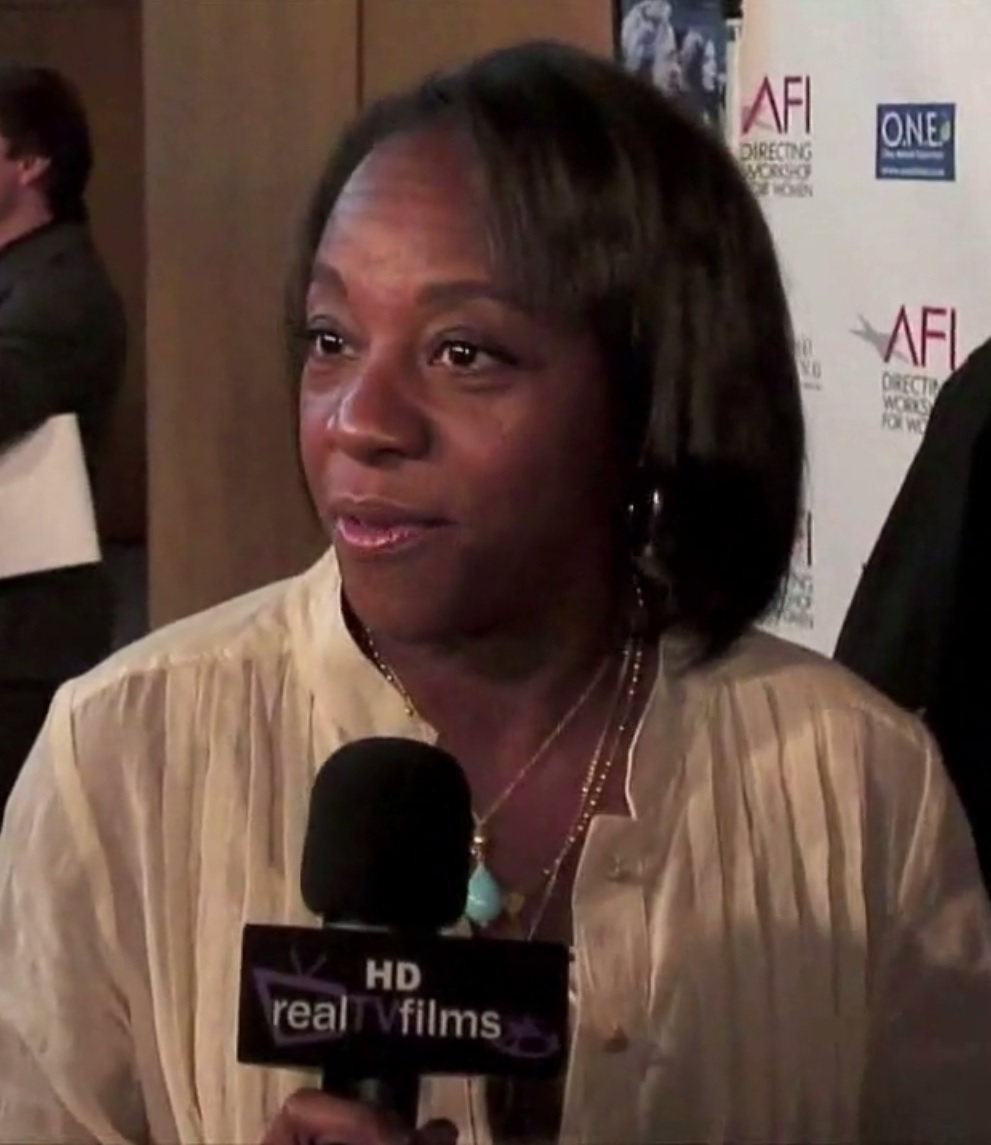
Jean-Baptiste in 2009

Jean-Baptiste relocated for work reasons to the United States and lives in Los Angeles with her husband and two daughters. She honed her American accent and starred in the American television series Without a Trace as FBI agent Vivian Johnson. More recently, the actress has appeared in such films and television shows as Takers (2010), Secrets in the Walls (2010), and Harry's Law (2012).

She was praised for her stage performances in the New York Shakespeare Festival's 2010 productions of The Winter's Tale and The Merchant of Venice and in the 2013 National Theatre production of James Baldwin's play The Amen Corner, directed by Rufus Norris. As a friend of Angela Bassett, Jean-Baptiste attended the 2013 Women's Image Network Awards and on Bassett's behalf picked up an award, reading Bassett's poetic acceptance speech for her winning role in the 2013 film Betty & Coretta. She played Detroit police chief Karen Dean in RoboCop (2014).

Jean-Baptiste teamed up again with Mike Leigh when she played the lead role in his 2024 film Hard Truths. In October 2024, Jean-Baptiste was given the "Virtuoso Award" at the San Diego International Film Festival. She garnered renewed critical acclaim and awards for her role, winning Best Actress awards from New York Film Critics Circle, Los Angeles Film Critics Association, and National Society of Film Critics, becoming the first Black actress to win the critics' trifecta. Additionally, she garnered Best Actress nominations from the Critics Choice Awards and the British Academy Film Awards. She also received high praise for her performance in the 2025 West End revival of Arthur Miller's All My Sons.

== Acting credits ==
=== Film ===
Year	Title	Role	Notes
1991	Once Upon a Time	Babysitter	Short film
1991	London Kills Me	Nanny	
1996	Distinction	Secretary	Short film
1996	Secrets & Lies	Hortense Cumberbatch	
1997	Mr. Jealousy	Lucretia	
1998	How to Make the Cruelest Month	Christina Parks	
1998	Nowhere to Go	Lynne Jacobs	
1998	A Murder of Crows	Elizabeth Pope	
1999	The 24 Hour Woman	Madeline Labelle	
2000	28 Days	Roshanda	
2000	The Cell	Dr. Miriam Kent	
2001	Women in Film	Sara	
2001	New Year's Day	Veronica	
2001	Spy Game	Gladys Jennip	
2002	Don't Explain	Elana	
2005	Welcome to California	Tina	
2006	Jam	Lorraine	
2008	City of Ember	Clary	
2009	Rooms		Short film
2009	The Bake Shop Ghost	Annie Washington	
2010	Takers	Naomi	
2010	Ink	—N/a	Short film; Writer and director
2011	Violet & Daisy	Number 1	
2011	360	Fran	
2011	Breaking Waves	Sarah Williams	
2012	Won't Back Down	Olivia Lopez	
2013	The Moment	Dr. Bloom	
2014	RoboCop	Chief Karen Dean	
2014	Edge of Tomorrow	Dr. Whittle	Uncredited role
2017	Home	Lois Fox	Short film
2018	Peter Rabbit	General Manager June	
2018	In Fabric	Sheila Woolchapel	
2018	Moving On	Jill	Short film
2020	Fatman	Ruth Cringle	
2021	Boxing Day	Shirley MacKenzie	
2022	The Sea Beast	Sarah Sharpe (voice)	
2023	The Book of Clarence	Amina	
2023	Rumble Through the Dark	Big Momma Sweet	
2024	Hard Truths	Pansy Deacon	
TBA	Hello & Paris		Filming
TBA	Jabari's People		Post-production

=== Television ===
Year	Title	Role	Notes
1994	Cracker	Marcia Reid	Episode: "Men Should Weep: Part 2"; Credited as Marianne Jean Baptiste
1996	Sharman	Precious	Episode: "A Good Year for the Roses"
1998	The Wedding	Ellen Coles	Television miniseries
1999	The Murder of Stephen Lawrence	Doreen Lawrence	Television miniseries
1999	The Man	Michelle	Television film
2001	Men Only	Gemma	Television film
2001	The Fear	Storyteller	Episode: "Sleep Tight"
2002–2009	Without a Trace	Vivian Johnson	Main role; directed season 7, episode 11: "Wanted"
2003	Loving You	Jude	Television film
2010	Secrets in the Walls	Belle	Television film
2011	Sons of Anarchy	Vivica	Episode: "Dorylus"
2011–2012	Harry's Law	Judge Patricia Seabrook	Episodes: "American Girl" and "New Kidney on the Block"
2012	Private Practice	Gabi Rivera	Episodes: "Good Grief" and "Life Support"
2015	Broadchurch	Sharon Bishop	8 episodes
2015–2017	Blindspot	FBI Assistant Director Bethany Mayfair	Main role (season 1), 23 episodes; Special guest star (season 2), 1 episode (voice only)
2017	Training Day	Deputy Chief Joy Lockhart	9 episodes
2017	How to Get Away with Murder	Virginia Cross	Episode: "It's for the Greater Good"
2018	Animals.	Grace (voice)	Episode: "Horses"
2018	Homecoming	Gloria Morisseau	5 episodes
2019	Soundtrack	Annette Sands	Main role; 10 episodes
2021	Master of None	Sharon (voice)	Episode: "Moments in Love, Chapter 4"
2022	Surface	Hannah	Main role; 8 episodes
2023	The Following Events Are Based on a Pack of Lies	Cheryl Harker	5 episodes

=== Theatre ===
Year	Title	Role	Playwright	Venue	Ref.
1990	Leave Taking	Del Matthews	Winsome Pinnock	Lyric, Hammersmith	
1993	It's a Great Big Shame!	Faith	Mike Leigh	Theatre Royal	
2010	The Winter's Tale	Paulina	William Shakespeare	Delacorte Theater, The Public Theater	
2010	The Merchant of Venice	Nerissa	William Shakespeare	Delacorte Theater, The Public Theater	
2013	The Amen Corner	Margaret Alexander	James Baldwin	National Theatre	
2015	Hang	Performer	Debbie Tucker Green	Royal Court Theatre, West End	
2025–2026	All My Sons	Kate Keller	Arthur Miller	Wyndham's Theatre, West End	

=== Radio ===
- When Love Speaks (2002, EMI Classics) – "Sonnet 15" ("When I consider everything that grows...")

== Awards and nominations ==
Year	Organization	Category	Work	Result	Ref.
1996	Awards Circuit Community Awards	Best Supporting Actress	Secrets & Lies	Nominated	
1997	Academy Awards	Best Supporting Actress	Secrets & Lies	Nominated	
1997	British Academy Film Awards	Best Actress in a Supporting Role	Secrets & Lies	Nominated	
1997	Chlotrudis Awards	Best Supporting Actress	Secrets & Lies	Nominated	
1997	Golden Globe Awards	Best Supporting Actress - Motion Picture	Secrets & Lies	Nominated	
1998	Online Film & Television Association	Best Supporting Actress in a Motion Picture or Miniseries	The Wedding	Nominated	
2000	Royal Television Society	Best Actor - Female	The Murder of Stephen Lawrence	Nominated	
2004	Screen Actors Guild Awards	Outstanding Performance by an Ensemble in a Drama Series	Without a Trace	Nominated	
2006	NAACP Image Awards	Outstanding Actress in a Drama Series	Without a Trace	Nominated	
2007	NAACP Image Awards	Outstanding Supporting Actress in a Drama Series	Without a Trace	Nominated	
2008	NAACP Image Awards	Outstanding Supporting Actress in a Drama Series	Without a Trace	Nominated	
2009	LA Femme Film Festival	Thespian Award	—N/a	Won	
2017	USA Film Festival	Performance Award	Home	Won	
2019	Indiana Film Journalists Association	Best Actress	In Fabric	Nominated	
2020	Fangoria Chainsaw Awards	Best Supporting Actress	In Fabric	Nominated	
2024	Denver Film Festival	Excellence in Acting Award	Hard Truths	Won	
2024	African-American Film Critics Association	Best Actress	Hard Truths	Won	
2024	Boston Online Film Critics Association	Best Actress	Hard Truths	Won	
2024	British Independent Film Awards	Best Lead Performance	Hard Truths	Won	
2024	Chicago Film Critics Association	Best Actress	Hard Truths	Won	
2024	Indiewire Critics' Poll	Best Performance	Hard Truths	Won	
2024	Los Angeles Film Critics Association	Best Lead Performance	Hard Truths	Won (Note: Shared with Mikey Madison for Anora.)	
2024	New York Film Critics Circle Awards	Best Actress	Hard Truths	Won	
2024	New York Film Critics Online	Best Actress	Hard Truths	Won	
2024	San Diego Film Critics Society	Best Actress	Hard Truths	Won	
2024	San Francisco Bay Area Film Critics Circle	Best Actress	Hard Truths	Won	
2024	Toronto Film Critics Association	Outstanding Lead Performance	Hard Truths	Won	
2024	Online Association of Female Film Critics	Best Female Lead	Hard Truths	Runner-up	
2024	St. Louis Film Critics Association	Best Actress	Hard Truths	Runner-up	
2024	Dallas–Fort Worth Film Critics Association	Best Actress	Hard Truths	Nominated	
2024	Florida Film Critics Circle	Best Actress	Hard Truths	Nominated	
2024	Gotham Awards	Outstanding Lead Performance	Hard Truths	Nominated	
2024	Seattle Film Critics Society	Best Actress	Hard Truths	Nominated	
2024	Washington D.C. Area Film Critics Association	Best Actress	Hard Truths	Nominated	
2025	Black Reel Awards	Outstanding Lead Performance	Hard Truths	Won	
2025	London Film Critics' Circle Awards	Actress of the Year	Hard Truths	Won	
2025	Alliance of Women Film Journalists	Best Actress	Hard Truths	Won	
2025	Greater Western New York Film Critics Association Awards	Best Actress	Hard Truths	Won	
2025	National Society of Film Critics	Best Actress	Hard Truths	Won	
2025	Georgia Film Critics Association	Best Actress	Hard Truths	Runner-up	
2025	Utah Film Critics Association Awards	Best Lead Performance, Female	Hard Truths	Runner-up	
2025	AARP Movies for Grownups Awards	Best Actress	Hard Truths	Nominated	
2025	Austin Film Critics Association	Best Actress	Hard Truths	Nominated	
2025	British Academy Film Awards	Best Actress in a Leading Role	Hard Truths	Nominated	
2025	Critics' Choice Awards	Best Actress	Hard Truths	Nominated	
2025	Chicago Indie Critics Windie Award	Best Actress	Hard Truths	Nominated	
2025	Columbus Film Critics Association	Best Lead Performance	Hard Truths	Nominated	
2025	Denver Film Critics Society	Best Lead Performance by an Actor, Female	Hard Truths	Nominated	
2025	DiscussingFilm Critic Awards	Best Actress	Hard Truths	Nominated	
2025	Dorian Awards	Film Performance of the Year	Hard Truths	Nominated	
2025	Houston Film Critics Society	Best Actress	Hard Truths	Nominated	
2025	London Film Critics' Circle Awards	British/Irish Performer of the Year	Hard Truths	Nominated	
2025	Minnesota Film Critics Alliance Awards	Best Actress	Hard Truths	Nominated	
2025	North Carolina Film Critics Association	Best Actress	Hard Truths	Nominated	
2026	Critics' Circle Theatre Awards	Best Actress	All My Sons	Nominated	
2026	Laurence Olivier Awards	Best Actress	All My Sons	Nominated	
