= Megan Shull =

American novelist

- Born: 1968 (age 57–58); Ithaca, New York, U.S.
- Education: Cornell University (BS, PhD)
- Occupation: Children's book author
- Website: heymegan.com

Megan Shull (born 1968) is an American author of books for children and young adults. Some of her best known works are, The Swap (HarperCollins, 2014), which was adapted as a Disney Channel Original Movie, Bounce (HarperCollins, 2016), and the award-winning young adult novel Amazing Grace (Disney Hyperion, 2005).

== Biography ==
Shull is known for her books aimed at young readers. Born and raised in Ithaca, New York, Shull holds a B.S. and Ph.D. from Cornell University. Her doctoral work in educational psychology focused on helping young people maintain resilience during adolescence, which influenced her writing.

Shull graduated from Ithaca High School and played ice hockey for Cornell University, where she later founded a mentoring program for girls involving the women's hockey team. In 2000, she participated in Girls on the Move, a coast-to-coast cycling project with Outward Bound.

Shull's writing career began with American Girl, where she published her first two books, Yours Truly, Skye O'Shea and Skye's the Limit!

She currently resides in Ithaca.
