= Jacob Bertrand =

American actor (born 2000)

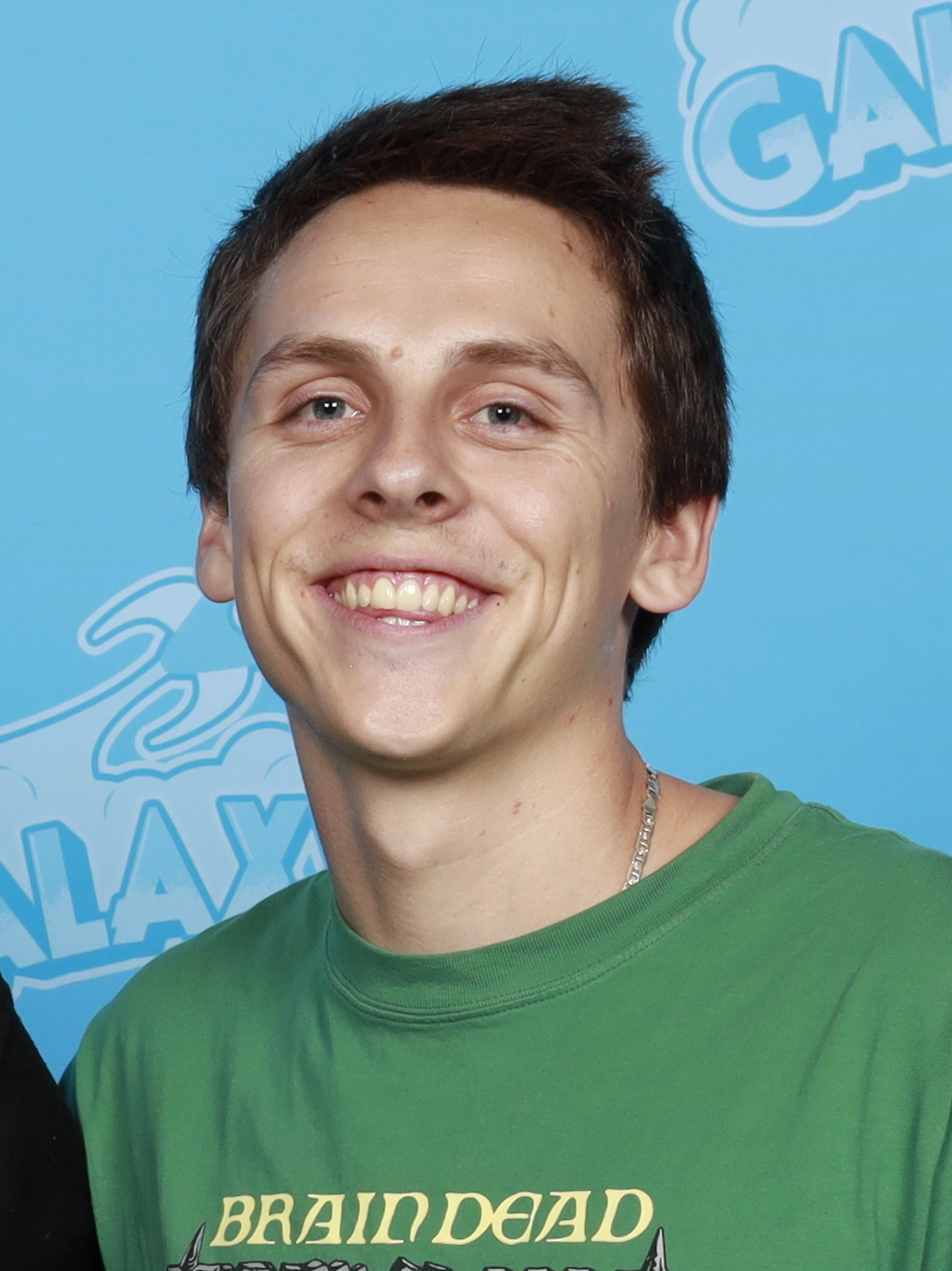
- Bertrand at the 2024 GalaxyCon Raleigh
- Born: Jacob Scott Thomas Bertrand; March 6, 2000 (age 26); Los Angeles, California, U.S.
- Occupation: Actor
- Years active: 2007–present

Jacob Scott Thomas Bertrand (born March 6, 2000) is an American actor. From 2018 to 2025, Bertrand played the series regular role of Eli "Hawk" Moskowitz in the Netflix series Cobra Kai. He is also known for the voice of Bam in Batwheels, portraying the titular character in Disney XD's Kirby Buckets and playing Jack Malloy in the 2016 Disney Channel Original Movie, The Swap.

== Early life ==
Bertrand was born in Los Angeles, California, and has three siblings. He is half Mexican. He said in an interview that he studied four years of taekwondo at a strip mall and got up to purple belt, then when he was cast in Cobra Kai, he trained with taekwondo grandmaster Simon Rhee.

== Career ==
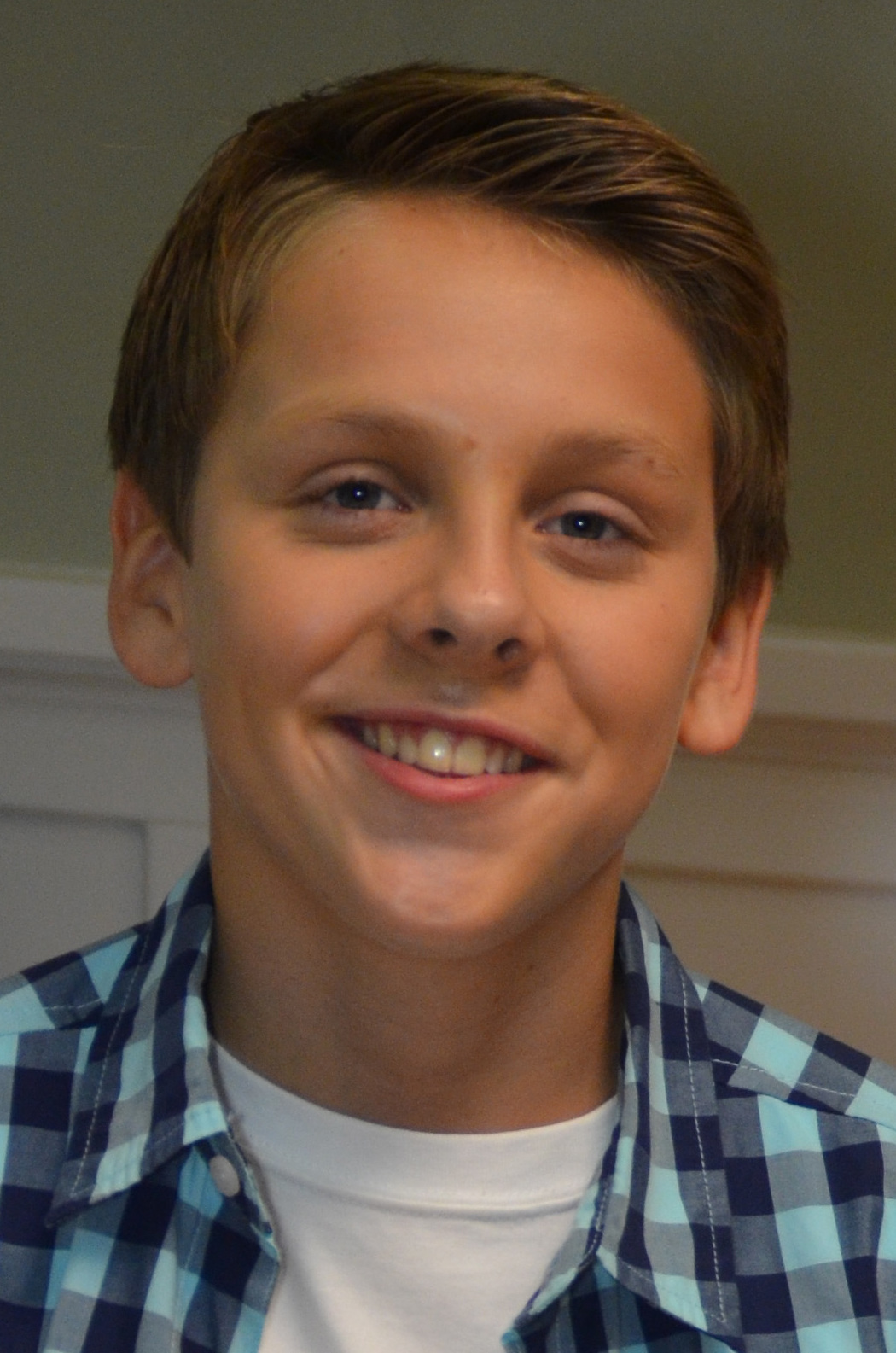
Bertrand in 2014

Prior to his work for Disney, Bertrand had several roles in Nickelodeon productions. He was a regular on the sitcom Marvin Marvin, voiced the main character Gil in Seasons 2 and 3 of the animated series Bubble Guppies, appeared as a minor character on the teen sitcom iCarly, and co-starred as Charlie in the fantasy-comedy film Jinxed. Since 2018 he has appeared in the YouTube Premium/Netflix television series Cobra Kai.

With Xolo Maridueña, Bertrand co-hosts the Lone Lobos podcast, which debuted in September 2021. Since 2022, Bertrand has voiced the lead character Bam in the animated children's show Batwheels. In November 2022, Bertrand and two friends started Three Floating, a YouTube channel dedicated to the trading card game Flesh and Blood.

== Personal life ==
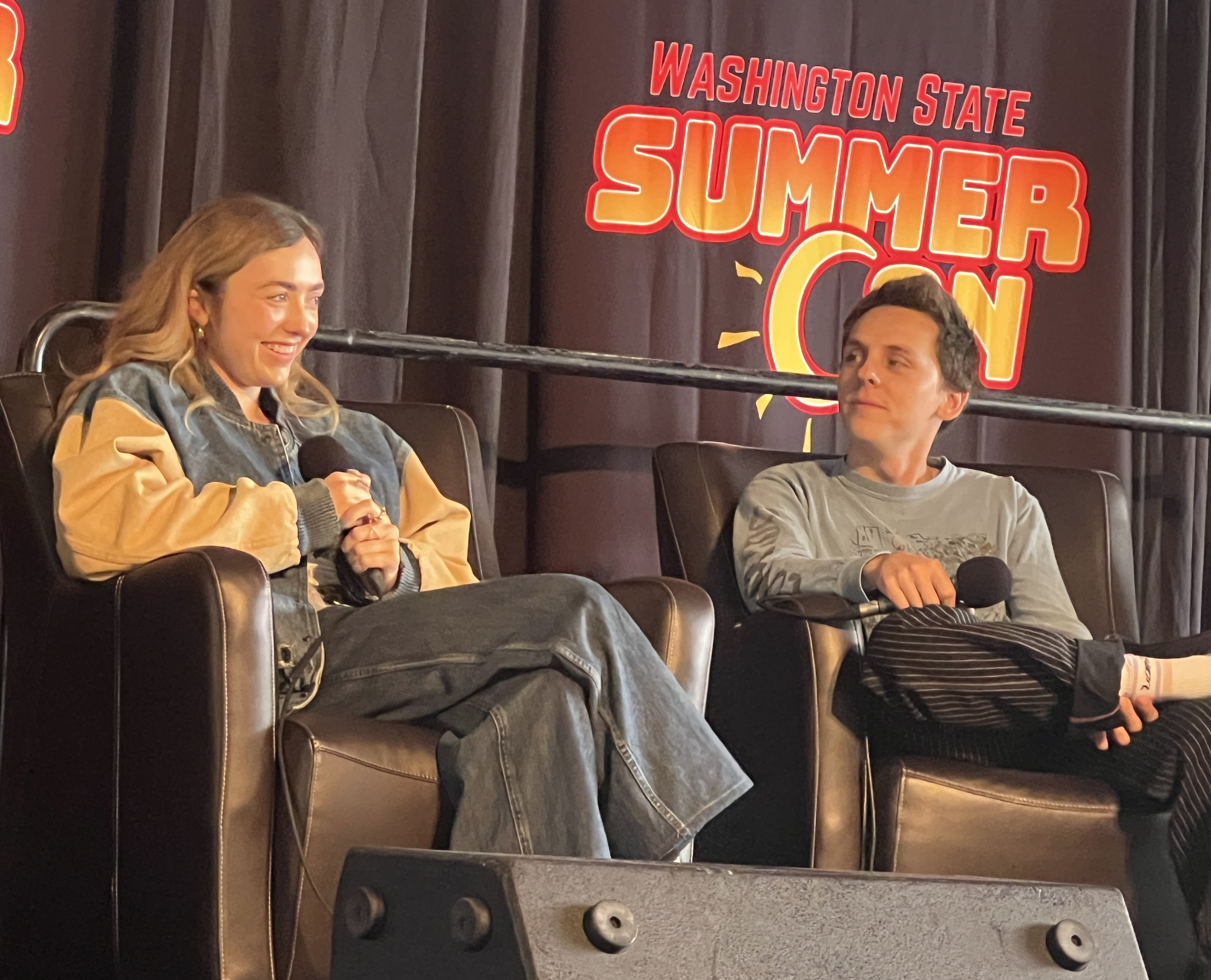
Bertrand (right) with his girlfriend, Peyton List, in 2025.

Bertrand is currently in relationship with Peyton List, his co-star in Cobra Kai. The two met in 2015 while filming the Disney channel original movie The Swap, and confirmed that they were dating in March 2022.

== Filmography ==
=== Film ===
Year	Title	Role	Notes
2009	Duress	Thomas Wilkins	
2012	Sunset Stories	Danny	
2012	ParaNorman	Blithe Hollow Townperson	Voice role
2012	Little Red Wagon	Kid	Uncredited
2012	Rise of the Guardians	Monty	Voice role
2013	Tom and Jerry's Giant Adventure	Jack	Direct-to-video film; voice role
2014	The Gambler	Young Boy	Uncredited
2018	Ready Player One	High School Kid	
2025	The Cobra Kai Movie Part II	Himself	Short film

=== Television ===
Year	Title	Role	Notes
2011	Little in Common	Boy	Unsold television pilot
2011	The Cape	Alpha-Kid	Episode: "Kozmo"
2011	The Middle	Jake	Episode: "Valentines Day II"
2011	Homeschooled	Abel	Web series; recurring role (4 episodes)
2011	Parks and Recreation	Darren	Episode: "Pawnee Rangers"
2011	Community	Young Jeff "Tinkle Town" Winger	Episode: "Foosball and Nocturnal Vigilantism"
2012–2015	Bubble Guppies	Gil	Main voice role (seasons 2–3)
2012	iCarly	Chip Chambers	Episode: "iBattle Chip"
2012	The Legend of Korra	Young Noatak	Voice role; episode: "Skeletons in the Closet"
2012–2013	Marvin Marvin	Henry Forman	Main role
2013	Jinxed	Charlie Murphy	Television movie
2014	Neckpee Island	OB	Unaired television pilot
2014–2017	Kirby Buckets	Kirby Buckets	Lead role
2016	The Swap	Jack Malloy	Disney Channel Original Movie
2017	The Lion Guard	Chama	Voice role; episode: "Rafiki's New Neighbors"
2018–2025	Cobra Kai	Eli "Hawk" Moskowitz	Recurring role (season 1); main role (season 2–6)
2022–present	Batwheels	Bam / Batmobile	Lead voice role
2024	Dinner Time Live with David Chang	Himself	Episode: "Friendsgiving"
2025	Pokémon Concierge	Kent	Voice role, English dub; episode: "Where I Belong"
2025	Sakamoto Days	Gaku	Voice role, English dub
2025	Tempest	TBA	

== Video games ==
- Cobra Kai: The Karate Kid Saga Continues (2020), as Eli "Hawk" Moskowitz (voice role)
- Cobra Kai 2: Dojos Rising (2022), as Eli "Hawk" Moskowitz (voice role)
