= Peyton List (actress, born 1998) =

American actress (born 1998)

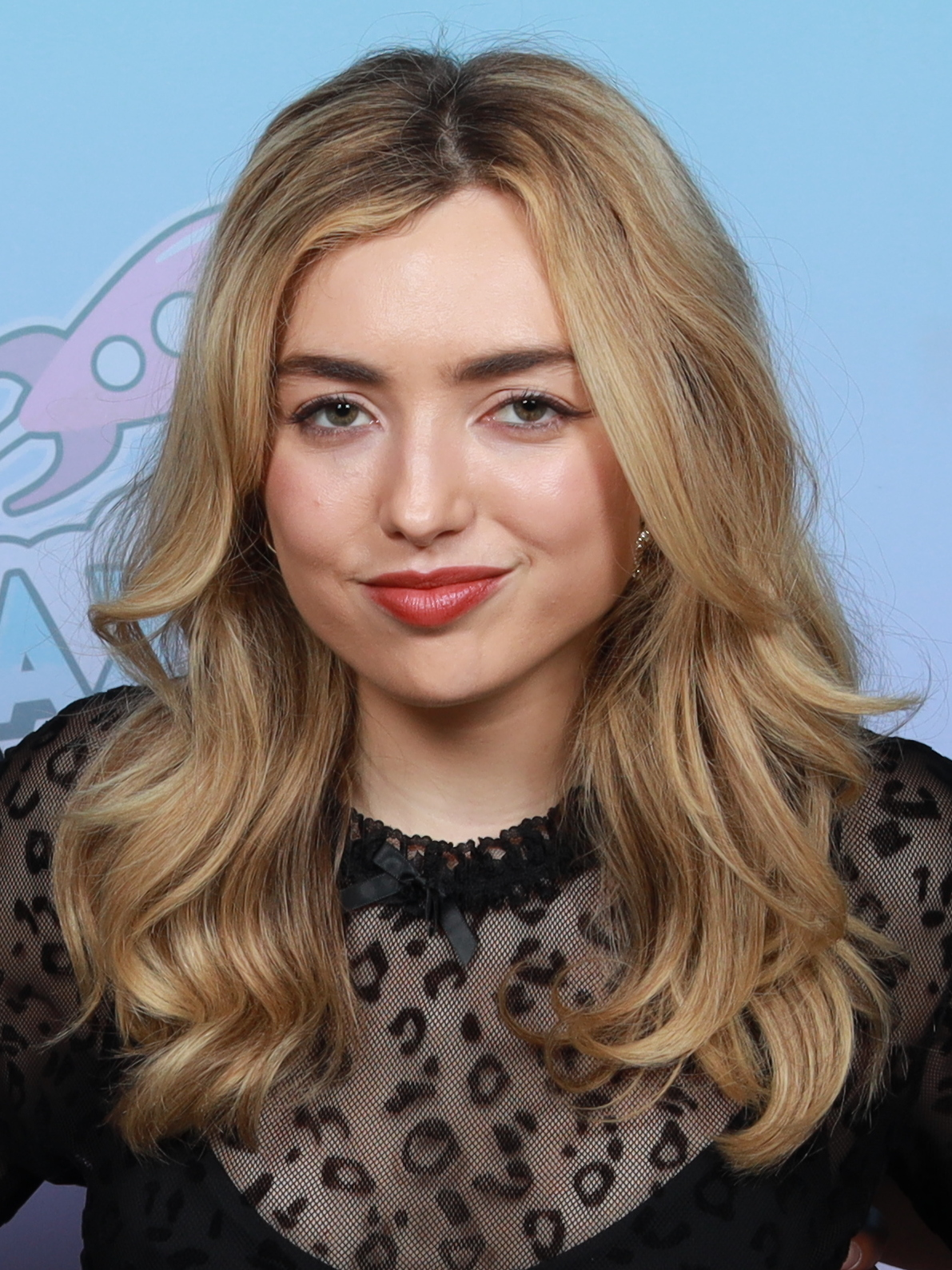
- List in 2024
- Born: Peyton Roi List; April 6, 1998 (age 28); West Palm Beach, Florida, U.S.
- Other name: Peyton R. List
- Occupations: Actress; model
- Years active: 2002–present
- Partner: Jacob Bertrand (2022–present)
- Relatives: Spencer List (twin brother)

Peyton Roi List (born April 6, 1998) is an American actress. She began her career as a child model, and transitioned to acting with a minor role in the film 27 Dresses (2008) at the age of nine. She appeared in the films Remember Me and Bereavement (both 2010), and achieved her breakout role as Holly Hills in the Diary of a Wimpy Kid film series (2011–2012). She gained further attention for portraying Emma Ross on the Disney Channel sitcom Jessie (2011–2015) and its spinoff Bunk'd (2015–2018, 2021).

List transitioned to mainstream roles with the YouTube Premium thriller film The Thinning (2016) and the Hulu series Light as a Feather (2018). Her film credits since include Valley Girl, Hubie Halloween (both 2020), Paper Spiders (2021), and The Inheritance (2024). She played Tory Nichols in the Netflix series Cobra Kai (2019–2025) and leads the Paramount+ series School Spirits (2023–present).

== Early life ==
Peyton Roi List was born on April 6, 1998, in West Palm Beach, Florida to John and Suzanne List. She has two brothers, her twin brother Spencer, and a younger brother, Phoenix, both of whom are also actors.

As a youth, List attended school in New York City at The Carroll School (P.S. 58) for elementary school, and the New Voices School for Academic and Creative Arts (M.S. 443) for middle school. She also trained as a dancer, studying ballet, jazz, tap, and hip-hop until she was in sixth grade.

List attended Oak Park High School in Oak Park, California, graduating in 2016.

== Career ==
=== 2002–2008: Early work and debut ===
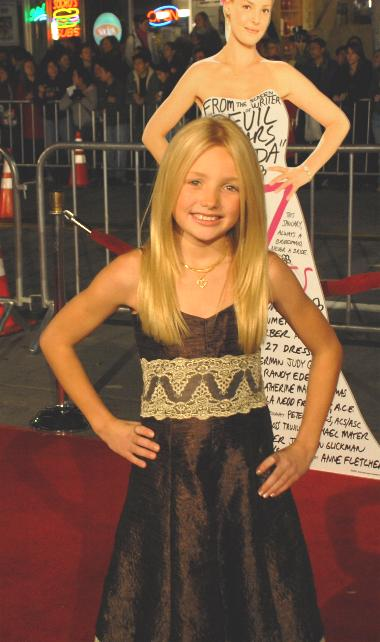
List at the 27 Dresses premiere in 2008

List first began her career as a child model, and in 2009 appeared on the cover of the American Girl's 2009 Back to School issue. In 2011, she modeled for Justice magazine. List had also appeared in over 400 advertisements in various formats for various companies. She began acting on television and in film appearances. List made an uncredited appearance on the soap opera As the World Turns in 2002. In 2004, she appeared on the television show All My Children as Bess, and in the same year made a cameo appearance in the feature film Spider-Man 2, which went uncredited. In 2008, List appeared in the feature film 27 Dresses, starring as the young version of the character Jane Nichols. The film was a commercial success, and served as her acting debut.

=== 2010–2015: Breakthrough with Disney and films ===
List began to appear in more feature films, and in 2010 was cast alongside Robert Pattinson in the film Remember Me as Samantha, a girl who bullies Pattinson's character's younger sister. The film was a box-office success. In the same year, List had begun her work with Disney, and appeared as the younger version of Becky in the fantasy film The Sorcerer's Apprentice, which turned to be a financial failure. She also was cast in the Lifetime television film Secrets in the Walls, and played Wendy Miller in the crime horror film Bereavement. In 2011, List starred as Holly Hills, the crush of Greg Heffley, in the comedy film Diary of a Wimpy Kid: Rodrick Rules, the second installment of the Diary of a Wimpy Kid film series. The film performed well commercially, and List later reprised her role for its sequel, Diary of a Wimpy Kid: Dog Days. The film was a success alike to its prequels, and the acting ensemble, including List, had won a Young Artist Award.

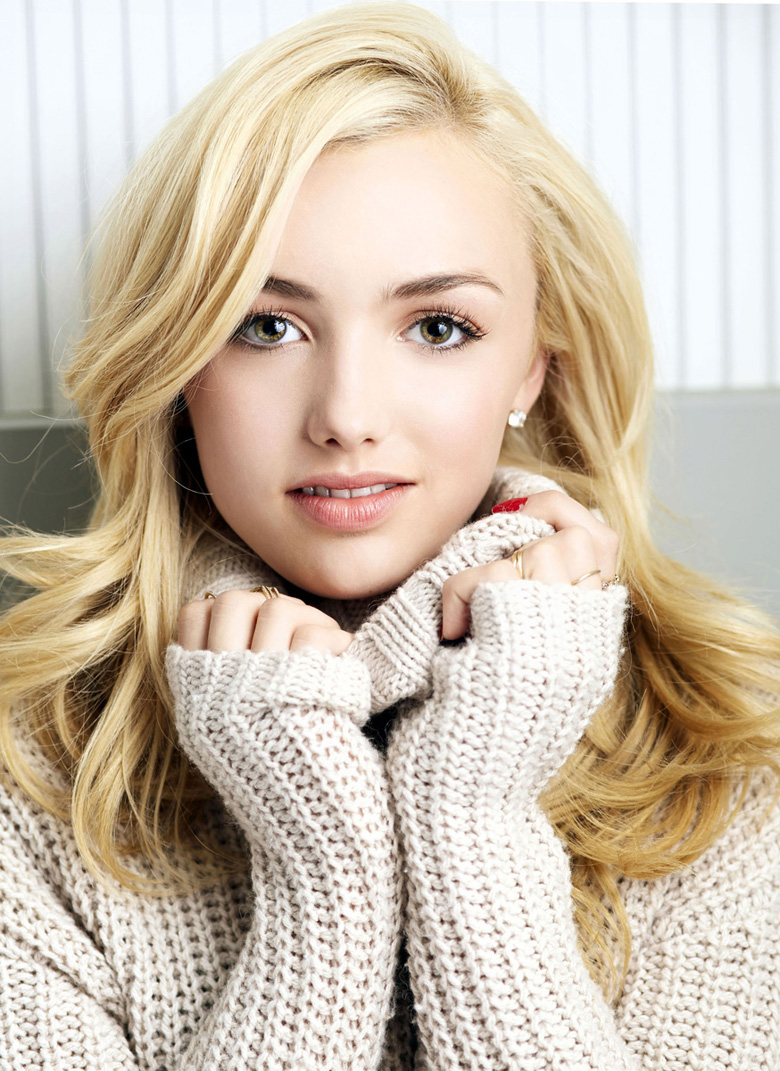
List in 2013

List next had a role in the romantic comedy film Something Borrowed in 2011, which was received negatively. That same year, List began her work on Disney Channel, and was cast as Emma Ross, the eldest of four affluent children, on the Disney Channel series Jessie alongside Debby Ryan and her Diary of a Wimpy Kid co-star Karan Brar. The show attained millions of viewers on average per episode, and soon became List's biggest role at the time. The show ran for four seasons and ended in February 2015. At the same time, it was announced that List, along with Brar and Skai Jackson, would reprise their roles in the spinoff series Bunk'd. The show began airing in 2015. Along with reprising the role on Bunk'd, List also had appeared as Emma Ross on other Disney Channel shows, such as Austin & Ally and I Didn't Do It. Along with her television work, List continued her work in films. In 2012, List appeared in the drama film The Trouble with Cali, which was received negatively. From 2013 to 2014, she co-hosted the Disney Channel program Pass the Plate, a segment focusing on healthy eating, with Karan Brar. In 2014, List voiced Princess Rose in the English dub of the German animated film The Seventh Dwarf. Though the film was a moderate financial success, it was received unfavorably by critics. In 2015, List performed with Ingrid Michaelson at one of Michaelson's concerts.

=== 2016–present: Mainstream transition ===
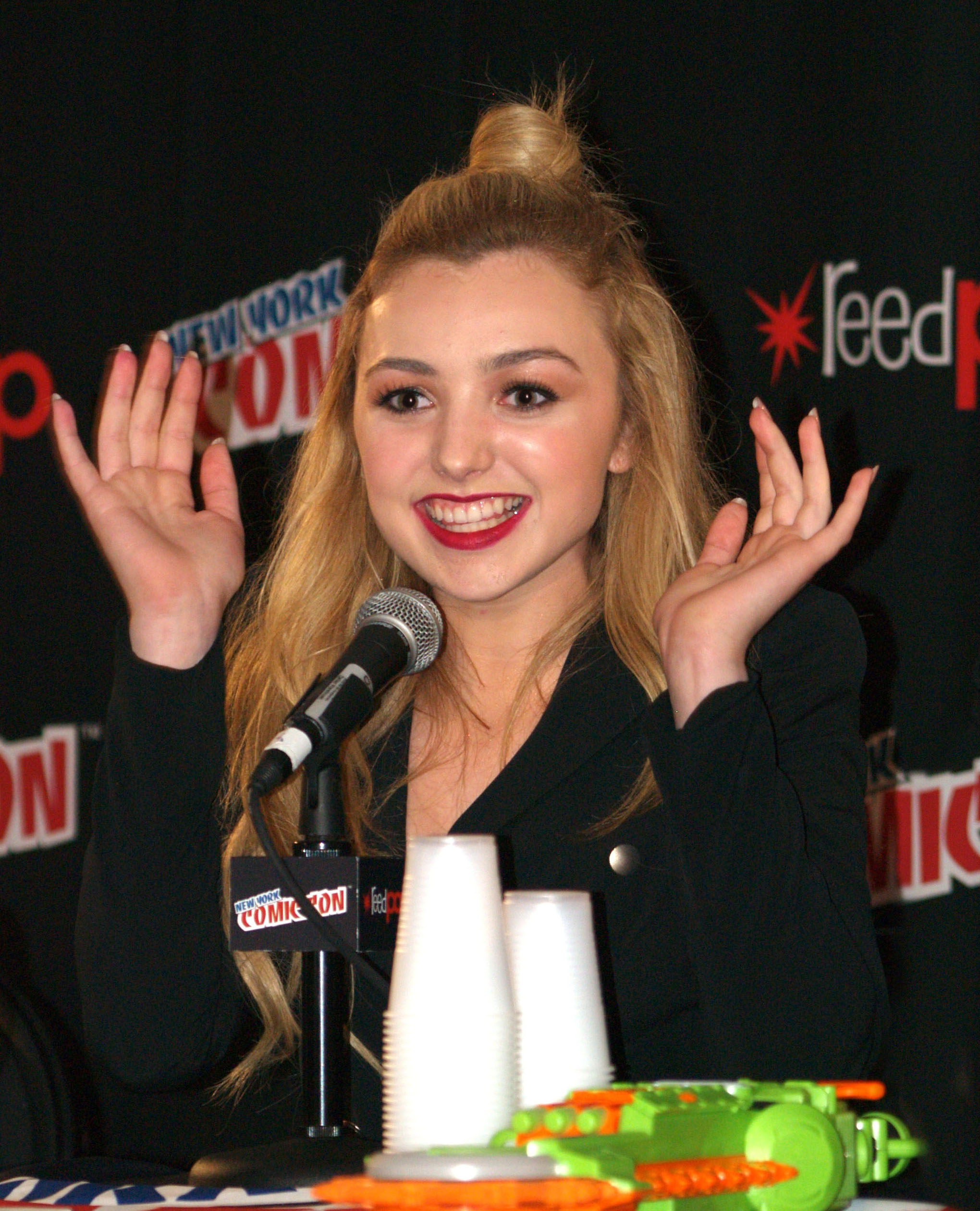
List at the New York Comic Con in 2016

In 2016, List co-starred along with Jacob Bertrand in the Disney Channel Original Movie The Swap, appearing as Ellie O'Brien. The premiere averaged over two million viewers, and had a mixed reception. In the same year, List appeared as Laina Michaels in the YouTube Premium film The Thinning, starring alongside Logan Paul and Lia Marie Johnson. In 2017, List appeared in the teen comedy film The Outcasts as Mackenzie Smith. Production had initially began in 2014 under its original title The Outskirts, and was not released until three years later. It was originally released direct-to-video, but was eventually picked up for a theatrical release. In 2018, it was announced that List would leave Bunk'd, and depart from her work on Disney Channel entirely. When she still worked with the network, List was an active member of the Disney Channel Circle of Stars.

List reprised her role as Laina Michaels in The Thinning: New World Order, the sequel to The Thinning, which was released in 2018. That same year, she starred alongside Asa Butterfield in the romantic drama film Then Came You as Ashley. List was soon cast in the main role of Olivia Richmond in the first season of the supernatural web series Light as a Feather, which was released through Hulu in October 2018. Also in 2018, List made her singing debut with the single "Liar Liar". In 2019, List voiced Barbara Gordon / Batgirl in the direct-to-video superhero film Batman: Hush. That same year, List was cast in the recurring role of Tory Nichols in the YouTube Premium action series Cobra Kai, which she began portraying in its second season.

In 2020, List appeared in the musical film Valley Girl, a remake of the 1983 film, had a role in the Netflix comedy-horror film Hubie Halloween, and co-starred in the drama film Paper Spiders opposite Stefania LaVie Owen and Lili Taylor. In June 2022, List was cast in the lead role in the Paramount+ television series School Spirits and it premiered in March 2023. In 2024, List was a part of two films, Girl Haunts Boy and The Inheritance, where she played a short role. In 2025, List signed with Gersh for representation in all areas.

In January 2026, List began portraying the role of Heather Chandler in the Off-Broadway revival of the musical Heathers: The Musical.

== Namefellow ==
List shares the same name with another actress, Peyton List (born 1986). The younger List was interviewed by Access Hollywood, saying she uses Peyton R. List to avoid confusion. Union SAG-AFTRA's policy avoids living actors with the same name; however, this instance went unnoticed.

Once, the two actresses appeared in the same scene when they both appeared on As the World Turns. Years later, this Peyton List cited confusion when both were staying at the same hotel. They received each other's daily call sheets and voicemails messages.

Entertainment industry news website IndieWire noted the confusion appeared on Wikipedia, where both actresses' articles began with exactly the same sentence, "Peyton List is an American actress and model."

Both actresses also voiced characters in the animated movie Batman: Hush, the younger as Batgirl and the older as Poison Ivy.

== Personal life ==
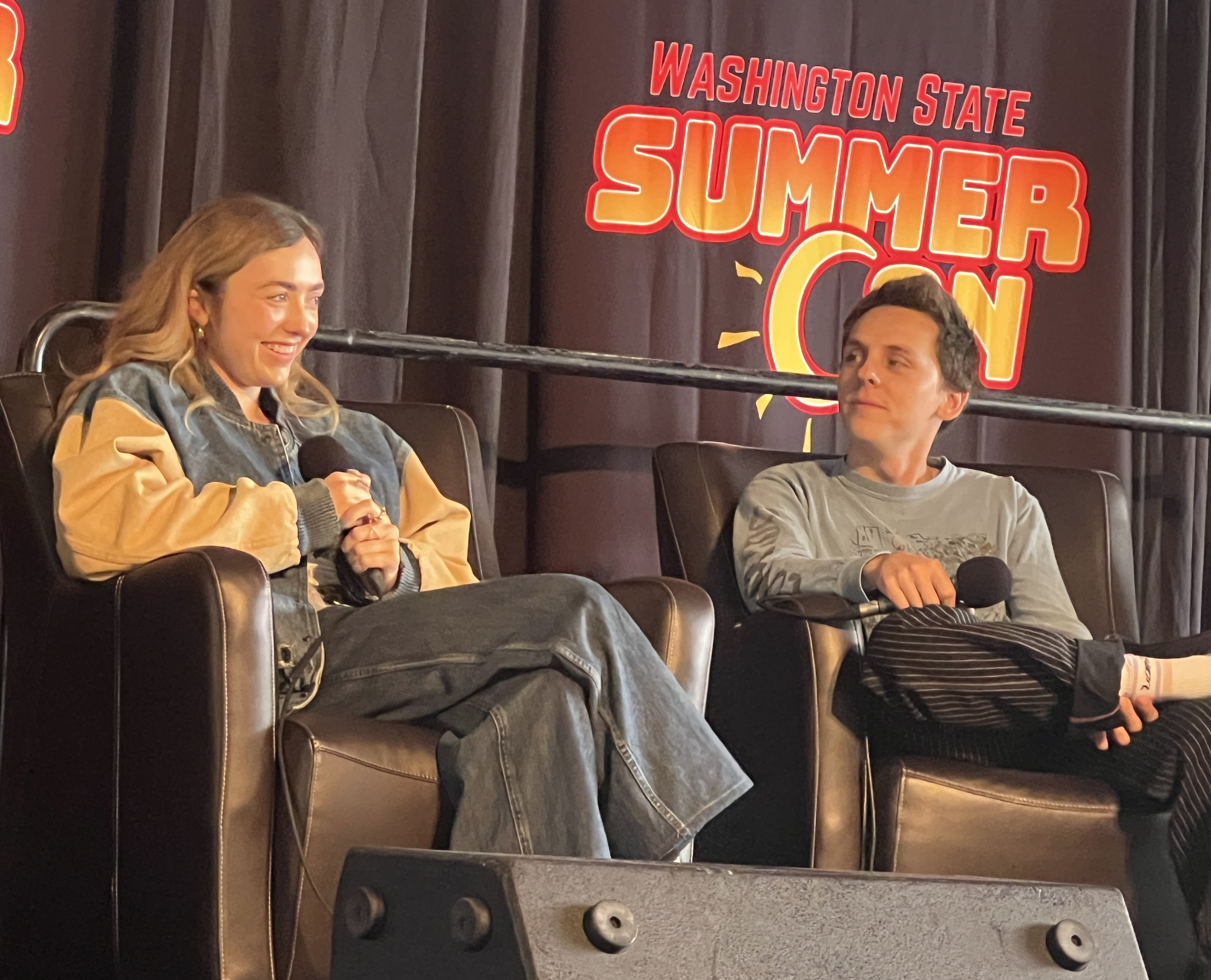
List (left) with her boyfriend, Jacob Bertrand, in 2025

List is in a relationship with Jacob Bertrand, her co-star in Cobra Kai. They first met in 2015 after working on the Disney Channel original movie The Swap and confirmed that they were dating in March 2022.

== Filmography ==
=== Film ===
Year	Title	Role	Notes	Ref(s)
2004	Spider-Man 2	Little girl playing on streets	Uncredited; deleted scene	
2008	27 Dresses	Young Jane Nichols		
2009	Confessions of a Shopaholic	Shoestore girl #2		
2010	3 Backyards	Emily		
2010	Remember Me	Samantha		
2010	The Sorcerer's Apprentice	Young Becky Barnes		
2010	Bereavement	Wendy Miller		
2011	Diary of a Wimpy Kid: Rodrick Rules	Holly Hills		
2011	Something Borrowed	Young Darcy Rhone		
2012	The Trouble with Cali	Young Cali Bluejones		
2012	Diary of a Wimpy Kid: Dog Days	Holly Hills		
2015	The Seventh Dwarf	Princess Rose	Voice	
2016	The Thinning	Laina Michaels		
2017	The Outcasts	Mackenzie Smith		
2018	Anthem of a Teenage Prophet	Faith		
2018	Then Came You	Ashley		
2018	The Thinning: New World Order	Laina Michaels		
2019	Batman: Hush	Barbara Gordon / Batgirl	Voice	
2020	Valley Girl	Courtney		
2020	Paper Spiders	Lacy		
2020	Hubie Halloween	Peggy		
2020	Swimming for Gold	Claire Carpenter		
2021	Aileen Wuornos: American Boogeywoman	Aileen Wuornos		
2022	The Friendship Game	Zooza		
2023	A Little White Lie	Sophie Firestone		
2024	The Inheritance	Kami		
2024	Girl Haunts Boy	Beatrix "Bea" Jenkins		

=== Television ===
Year	Title	Role	Notes	Ref(s)
2002	As the World Turns	Little girl in diner	Season 47, episode 143; uncredited	
2004	All My Children	Bess	Season 35, episode 229	
2005	Late Show with David Letterman	Young tourist at the Paul Shaffer hotel	Season 12, episode 194	
2007	Saturday Night Live	Little girl	Uncredited; episode: "LeBron James/Kanye West"	
2008	Cashmere Mafia	Sasha Burden	4 episodes	
2008	Wonder Pets	Piglet #1 / chick #1	Voice role; episode: "Kalamazoo"	
2008	Late Show with David Letterman	Von Trapp kid	Season 15, episode 73; uncredited	
2009	Gossip Girl	Little girl #1	Episode: "Enough About Eve"	
2010	Secrets in the Walls	Molly Easton	Television film	
2011	Law & Order: Special Victims Unit	Young Larissa Welsh	Episode: "Possessed"	
2011–2015	Jessie	Emma Ross	Main role; 100 episodes	
2012	Austin & Ally	Emma Ross	Episode: "Austin & Jessie & Ally All Star New Year"	
2012	The Dog Who Saved the Holidays	Eve	Voice; television film	
2013	A Sister's Nightmare	Emily Ryder	Television film	
2013–2014	Pass the Plate	Herself	Co-host (seasons 3–4)	
2014	I Didn't Do It	Sherri	Episode: "Dance Fever"	
2014	Ultimate Spider-Man	Emma Ross	Voice; episode: "Halloween Night at the Museum"	
2015–2018, 2021	Bunk'd	Emma Ross	Main role (seasons 1–3); guest star (season 5); 59 episodes; also director: "Game of Totems"	
2015	K.C. Undercover	Emma	Episode: "All Howl's Eve"	
2016	The Swap	Ellie O'Brien	Disney Channel Original Movie	
2018	Love Daily	Audrey	Episode: "The Last First Kiss"	
2018	Happy Together	Sierra	Episode: Pilot	
2018–2019	Light as a Feather	Olivia Richmond	Main role (season 1); guest role (season 2)	
2019	Project Runway All Stars	Herself	Guest judge; episode 7.5	
2019–2025	Cobra Kai	Tory Nichols	Recurring role (seasons 2–3); main role (seasons 4–6); 45 episodes	
2020	Robot Chicken	Sabrina Spellman	Voice; episode: "Endgame"	
2020	Group Chat	Herself	Episode: "Slime Into Your DMs"	
2020	Nickelodeon's Unfiltered	Herself	Episode: "Cactus Pop Tarts!"	
2021	Ridiculousness	Herself	Episode: "Peyton List"	
2023–present	School Spirits	Maddie Nears / Janet Hamilton	Main role; also executive producer	

=== Theater ===
Year	Title	Role	Venue	Notes
2026	Heathers: The Musical	Heather Chandler	New World Stages	Off-Broadway

=== Video games ===
- Cobra Kai 2: Dojos Rising (2022) as Tory Nichols (voice role)

=== Music videos ===
- "Only You" (2018), by Cheat Codes and Little Mix
- "Graduation" (2019), by Benny Blanco and Juice Wrld

== Awards and nominations ==
Year	Award	Category	Work	Result	Ref.
2013	Young Artist Award	Best Performance in a Feature Film – Young Ensemble Cast (Note: Shared with Zachary Gordon, Robert Capron, Laine MacNeil, Connor & Owen Fielding, Devon Bostick and Grayson Russell)	Diary of a Wimpy Kid: Dog Days	Won	
2020	Kids' Choice Award	Favorite Female TV Star	Bunk'd	Nominated	
2022	Kids' Choice Award	Favorite Female TV Star (Family)	Cobra Kai	Nominated	
2024	Kids' Choice Award	Favorite Female TV Star (Family)	School Spirits	Nominated	
2025	Kids' Choice Award	Favorite Female TV Star (Family)	Cobra Kai	Won	
