= Secrets in the Walls =

American TV horror mystery film

- Promotional poster
- Genre: Drama; Horror; Thriller
- Written by: William Penick; Christopher D. Sey
- Directed by: Christopher Leitch
- Starring: Jeri Ryan; Kay Panabaker; Peyton Roi List; Ian Kahn; Marianne Jean-Baptiste
- Music by: Jeff Cardoni
- Country of origin: United States
- Original language: English

Production
- Executive producers: Michael R. Goldstein; Michael G. Larkin
- Producers: Kyle A. Clark; Marta M. Mobley
- Cinematography: Kees Van Oostrum
- Editor: John Duffy
- Running time: 85 minutes
- Production companies: Larkin-Goldstein Productions; Silver Screen Pictures; RHI Entertainment

Original release
- Network: Lifetime Movie Network
- Release: October 24, 2010

Secrets in the Walls is an American made for television mystery horror drama film directed by Christopher Leitch and starring Jeri Ryan. It aired on October 24, 2010 in the United States on the Lifetime Movie Network. It was released on DVD on September 20, 2011.

== Plot ==
Molly, Lizzie (two sisters), and their mother, Rachel, move from downtown Detroit to Ferndale, Michigan, into a very old house. After many strange things begin to happen, Rachel does some research on the house's history and finds out that the house was owned in the 1950s by a 17-year-old German girl, Greta, and her abusive husband, and that while she lived there, she went missing and was never seen again. Upon searching the house, Rachel and her brother discover the girl's skeleton boarded up inside the wall of Lizzie's bedroom with scratch marks on the wood inside, suggesting she was locked in there while still alive. They assume that by releasing her remains, she can move on in peace to the spirit realm. However, after being locked up for so long and deprived of her life, Greta isn't so compliant.

Lizzie is a year younger than Greta was when she died, so Greta uses her powers to trade places with Lizzie after putting a necklace on Lizzie that belonged to Greta when she was alive. Molly sees right through Greta, knowing that she isn't Lizzie, but doesn't get a chance to tell anyone. Meanwhile, Rachel's friend, who is skilled at dealing with spirits, has come to try to get rid of Greta's presence, not knowing that her spirit and Lizzie's have switched places. She almost banishes Lizzie's spirit to the afterlife when Molly enters, disturbing the ritual, and explains to Rachel and her friend what is really going on. Rachel plays along the next day, acting as if she doesn't know Lizzie's body is inhabited by Greta, and lures her back to the house. While on the large staircase, she confronts Greta, asking if she knows why she named her daughter Lizzie, something the real Lizzie would know in an instant. Greta has no idea, and the two begin to fight. Rachel has Lizzie/Greta pinned, hanging over the banister of the stairs, and starts calling Lizzie to fight Greta off and take back her body. With a surge of strength, Greta tries to fight Rachel off one last time. Lizzie is finally able to get back in her body and she says "Mom?", but then she falls off the edge of the stairs. When she hits the ground, she is severely injured. After several minutes, Lizzie regains consciousness with the words, "You named me Elizabeth because she was strong" referring to Elizabeth in Pride and Prejudice, Rachel's favorite book.

Rachel moves out with Molly and Lizzie, only to discover the person who sold them the house already leading new potential buyers inside. Rachel feels morally obligated to warn the potential customers of the house's past and her experience in it, but they write her off as crazy. She seems content to have tried, and drives off with her two daughters and her brother. The very last scene shows the buyers walking in as Rachel's family drives away, and Greta's ghost glaring after them out of an upstairs window, suggesting that she is not ready to give up the life she never had quite yet.

== Cast ==
- Jeri Ryan as Rachel Easton
- Kay Panabaker as Lizzie Easton
- Peyton Roi List as Molly Easton
- Ian Kahn as Marty
- Marianne Jean-Baptiste as Belle

== Reception ==
Radio Times gave it 2 out of 5 stars.
