= Pass the Plate =

2007–2014 American TV series

- Genre: Cooking; Educational
- Presented by: Brenda Song (season 1); Peyton List (seasons 2–3); Karan Brar (seasons 2–3)
- Country of origin: United States
- Original language: English
- No. of seasons: 3
- No. of episodes: 21

Production
- Executive producer: Brenda Song
- Camera setup: Multi-camera
- Running time: 2 minutes
- Production company: Riverstreet Productions

Original release
- Network: Disney Channel
- Release: October 22, 2007 – November 8, 2014

Pass the Plate is a multicultural short-form series filmed in ten countries that was produced by Riverstreet Productions in association with Disney Channel. Hosted by Brenda Song, the first season of the series included various other Disney Channel performers from all around the world. Season 2, which debuted on November 1, 2013, was co-hosted by Peyton List and Karan Brar. The third season, also hosted by List and Brar, premiered in its entirety on November 8, 2014.

== Summary ==
Rotating on-air each day, Pass the Plate "aims to inspire kids and preteens to lead a healthier lifestyle by sharing cultural and historical facts about food and cooking, while giving emphasis to kids assisting in the preparation of their own meal." Each of the segments focuses on the exposition, preparation and health benefits of one food item – mangoes, rice, fish, tomatoes, bananas, grains, vegetables, fruits, and spinach – and takes viewers across the globe on a tour of how these foods are enjoyed by kids and families in each country.

== Production ==
"We want our programming to reflect and recognize that everyone shares a responsibility to encourage kids and families to adopt healthy lifestyles. Our ongoing healthy kids initiatives...and especially Pass the Plate...represent our global team's effort to both inform and empower our viewers, showing them how kids just like them around the world enjoy and benefit from healthy foods", Disney Channel's Worldwide President Rich Ross said in a statement.

Culinary educator David Glickman is a consultant to the Pass the Plate series.

== Host ==
=== Original ===
- Brenda Song (season 1)
- Peyton List (seasons 2–3)
- Karan Brar (seasons 2–3)

=== International ===
Disney Channel Australia

- Alicia Banit
- Deniz Akdeniz
- Jack Pearson

Disney Channel Brazil

- Robson Nunes
- Michelli Machado
- Olavo Cavalheiro
- Renata Ferreira

Dragon Club (China)

- Chi Shuai
- Lu Yun

Disney Channel France

- Côme Levin
- Manon Azem
- Julien Crampon
- Léa Fomzaw

Disney Channel India

- Sonia Malhotra
- Sunny Malhotra

Disney Channel Italy

- Giulio Rubinelli
- Ambra Lo Faro

Disney Channel Japan

- bless4
- Marika Fukunaga

(Argentina) Disney Channel Latin America

- Daniel Martins
- Federico Di Iorio

Disney Channel Mexico

- David Holguin Garcia
- Paulina Holguin Garcia

Disney Channel Spain

- Andreas Muñoz

Disney Channel South Africa

- Isha
- Rondell

Disney Channel Singapore

- Renjie

(United Kingdom) Disney Channel UK

- Brad Kavanagh
- Gregg Sulkin
- Sydney White

Disney Channel Vietnam

- Vy Nguyen

== List of dishes ==
Below is a list of dishes featured during the first season of Pass the Plate hosted by Brenda Song, with Wikilinks where appropriate.

Season 1

Rice Episode

- Congee (China)
- Mallige Idli (India)
- Rice Salad (Italy)
- Onigiri (Japan)
- California roll (US)

Tomatoes Episode

- Caprese salad (Italy)
- Frikadels (South Africa)
- Tomato Farcies (France)
- Tomates Rellenos (Argentina)
- Marinara Sauce (US)

Spinach Episode

- Poached Eggs with Spinach (Australia)
- Spinach Salad with Citrus Fruits (France)
- Goma-ae/Bento Boxes (Japan)
- Creamy Spinach Soup (UK)
- Baked Spinach Balls (US)

Fish Episode

- Chirashizushi with shredded nori (Japan)
- Poisson en Papillote (France)
- Spaghetti al Cartoccio (Italy)
- Boiled Prawns (UK)

Bananas Episode

- Grilled Bananas (set at Big Banana in Coffs Harbour) (Australia)
- Banana Smoothies (UK)
- Durban Curried Banana Salad (South Africa)
- Arroz com Feijao E Banana (Brazil)

Mangoes Episode

- Spinach, Mango and Chicken Salad (US)
- Sliced Mango on a Stick (Mexico)
- Mango Lassi (India)
- Fruity Icy Pole (Australia)
- Beef and Mango Stir-Fry (China)

Second Fish Episode

- Traditional Japanese fish markets / Porgy fish with miso broth (Japan)
- Cod fish and chips (UK)

Vegetable Episode

- Rice paper rolls (Vietnam)
- Ratatouille (France)

Grain Episode

- Various pastas (Italy)
- Mee (Singapore)

Fruit Episode

- Fruit salad (Brazil)
- Orange with pomegranate/Pomegranate juice (Spain / US)

== Episodes ==
=== Season 1 (2007–08) ===
- Episode 1: "Rice"
- Episode 2: "Tomato"
- Episode 3: "Spinach"
- Episode 4: "Fish"
- Episode 5: "Banana"
- Episode 6: "Mango"
- Episode 7: "Fish 2"
- Episode 8: "Vegetables"
- Episode 9: "Grains"
- Episode 10: "Fruit"

=== Season 2 (2013) ===
- Episode 11: "Cheesemaking"
- Episode 12: "Urban Farming"
- Episode 13: "Gluten-free Grains"
- Episode 14: "Urban Beekeeping"
- Episode 15: "Aquaponics"
- Episode 16: "Slide Ranch"

=== Season 3 (2014) ===
- Episode 17: "Greenhouse on Wheels"
- Episode 18: "Rooftop Farming"
- Episode 19: "Shellfish Farming"
- Episode 20: "Popcorn Farming"
- Episode 21: "Pickling"

== Worldwide shows ==
=== United Kingdom ===
The show aired on Disney Channel UK in November 2011. Hosted by Gregg Sulkin, Brad Kavanagh, Sydney White, and Amy Wren, it visited the world to find out about what they eat, like China for noodles, or India for curry. There were also tips on healthy eating.

== Merchandise ==
Disney Consumer Products in the United Kingdom announced a deal with Tesco in 2007 to launch a line of branded food products featuring Disney characters. All the items would conform to nutritional guidelines and limits.
