= Ian Kahn =

American actor (born 1972)

- Born: Ian R. Kahn; April 21, 1972 (age 54); New York City, New York, U.S.
- Occupation: Actor
- Years active: 1994–present

Ian R. Kahn (born April 21, 1972) is an American stage, television actor and podcast host, perhaps best known for his roles on Turn: Washington's Spies, Dawson's Creek, Bull, The Unusuals and As the World Turns. He portrayed George Washington in 24 episodes of the 2014 TV series, Turn: Washington's Spies.

He made his Broadway debut in ENRON at the Broadhurst Theater in April 2010. In September 2009, he made his off-Broadway debut in MCC's Still Life. He has appeared in major regional theater companies across the United States. Some of his roles have included Mortimer in Arsenic and Old Lace at the Baltimore Center Stage, Algernon in The Importance of Being Earnest at the Arena Stage, Johnny Wheelwright in A Prayer For Owen Meany at Roundhouse theater, Tom in The Glass Menagerie at St. Louis Rep, Henry Higgins in My Fair Lady at The Media Theater, Septimus Hodge in Arcadia at the Wilma Theater, and as William Shakespeare in The Beard of Avon at the Cape Playhouse.

He co-hosts the Athletic's Under the Radar Podcast with Derek Van Riper and Nando Di Fino. He also does Fantasy Baseball Dynasty Rankings for the Athletic.

He graduated from the Ethical Culture Fieldston School in Riverdale, Bronx, New York, in 1990 and from Skidmore College in Saratoga Springs, New York, in 1994. Kahn is Jewish.

== Filmography ==
=== Film ===
Year	Title	Role	Note
2003	Welcome to the Neighborhood	Jerry	
2005	Brooklyn Lobster	Justin Wallace	
2007	Day Zero	Ben Goldman	
2009	The Box	Vick Brenner	
2021	The Magnificent Meyersons	Roland Meyerson	

=== Television ===
Year	Title	Role	Note
1994	CBS Schoolbreak Special	Steve	Episode: "My Summer as a Girl"
1999	Sex and the City	Ben	Episode: "The Freak Show"
2000	Bull	Marty Decker	20 episodes
2001	Dawson's Creek	Danny Brecher	9 episodes
2002	Law & Order: Special Victims Unit	David Anderson	Episode: "Waste"
2003	Law & Order: Criminal Intent	Ken Harris	Episode: "Blink"
2006	In Men We Trust	Everett	
2007	Reinventing the Wheelers	Peter Hudgins	
2007	As the World Turns	Eliot Gerard	4 episodes
2008	Law & Order	Chris Mason	Episode: "Zero"
2009	The Unusuals	Davis Nixon	5 episodes
2010	Law & Order: Criminal Intent	Frank Bolinger	Episode: "Traffic"
2010	Secrets in the Walls	Marty	
2011	CSI: Miami	Dean Marshall	Episode: "G.O"
2011	Castle	Sal Martino	Episode: "Cops & Robbers"
2012	Suits	Tom Klapperich	Episode: "The Choice"
2012	The Mentalist	Peter Mulberry	Episode: "At First Blush"
2013	Bones	Ted Robertson	Episode: "The Dude in the Dam"
2014-2015	Shameless	Jason	2 episodes
2014–2017	Turn: Washington's Spies	George Washington	24 episodes Recurring (season 1); Main (seasons 2–4)
2015	The Good Wife	Randy Duffield	Episode: "Payback"
2015	Master of None	Brad	Episode: "Ladies and Gentlemen"
2017	Homeland	Roger	2 episodes
2017	Billions	Fred Reyes	2 episodes
2017	Bull	Rex Kensington	Episode: "Home for the Holidays"
2018	Quantico	David Quintana	Episode: “Deep Cover”
2019	Elementary	Alwyn Smith	Episode: “Command: Delete”
