= Alexander Rose (author) =

British historian

- Education: Cambridge University
- Occupation: Historian
- Writing career
- Language: English
- Genre: Non-fiction
- Subjects: American history British history
- Notable work: Washington's Spies: The Story of America's First Spy Ring
- Website: www.alexrose.com

Alexander Rose (born 1971) is an author and a historian.

== Early life ==
Born in the United States, Rose was raised in Australia and Britain and educated at Cambridge University. He was awarded a doctorate for his thesis, Radar Strategy: The Air Dilemma and British Politics, 1932–1937.

== Career ==
He worked as a journalist for several years, including as an editorial writer for The Daily Telegraph (UK) and the National Post (Canada). He has written Kings in the North: The House of Percy in British History, a biography of some thirteen generations of the barons and earls of Northumberland between 1066 and 1485; Washington's Spies: The Story of America's First Spy Ring (a detailed account of George Washington's personal spies, the Culper Ring); American Rifle: A Biography, describing how America's military firearms shaped the country's history and vice versa; and Empires of the Sky: Zeppelins, Airplanes, and Two Men's Epic Duel to Rule the World concerning the competition between airplanes and zeppelins. He is a Fellow of the Royal Historical Society and a Guggenheim Fellowship recipient.

Renamed Turn: Washington's Spies, Washington's Spies: The Story of America's First Spy Ring aired on AMC as a television series.

Rose writes the Spionage newsletter, and his work has appeared in The Wall Street Journal, The New York Times, The Washington Post, The New York Observer, the CIA journal Studies in Intelligence, MHQ: The Quarterly Journal of Military History, Invention & Technology, Intelligence and National Security, The National Interest, and The English Historical Review.

== Filmography ==
Television
Year	TV Series	Credit	Notes
2015–2017	Turn: Washington's Spies	Writer	Episodes: "Men of Blood"; "Blade on the Feather"; "Our Man in New York"
2017	Turn: Washington's Spies	Edmund Hewlett's aide	(uncredited); Episode: "Our Man in New York"

== Reviews ==
- Review of American Rifle at Letters on Pages

== Publications ==
- Rose, Alexander (2002). Kings in the North: The House of Percy in British History. Weidenfeld & Nicolson. ISBN 978-0-297-81860-1. OCLC 45338102.
- Rose, Alexander (2006). Washington's Spies: The Story of America's First Spy Ring. Bantam Books. ISBN 0-553-80421-9. OCLC 64230502.
- Rose, Alexander (2008). American Rifle: A Biography. Bantam Dell. ISBN 0-553-80517-7. OCLC 191922709.
- Rose, Alexander (2015). Men of War: The American Soldier in Combat at Bunker Hill, Gettysburg, and Iwo Jima. Random House. ISBN 978-0-553-80518-5. OCLC 885313615.
- Rose, Alexander (2020). Empires of the Sky: Zeppelins, Airplanes, and Two Men's Epic Duel to Rule the World. Random House. ISBN 978-0812989984. OCLC 9451220440.
- Rose, Alexander (2022). The Lion and the Fox: Two Rival Spies and the Secret Plot to Build a Confederate Navy. Mariner Books. ISBN 978-0358393252. OCLC 1291171199.
- Rose, Alexander (2025). Phantom Fleet: The Hunt for Nazi Submarine U-505 and WWII's Most Daring Heist. Little, Brown and Company. ISBN 978-0-316-56447-2. OCLC 1519508272.
