= Andrew Colville (writer) =

American screenwriter

- Education: Harvard College (BA)
- Occupation: Television Writer
- Writing career
- Notable works: Mad Men, Nikita

Andrew Colville is an American screenwriter.

He has worked on the AMC drama Mad Men, for which he won a Writers Guild of America (WGA) Award. Following that he was a writer on the Fox series Lone Star. After the cancellation of Lone Star, he became a writer and co-producer on the first season of The CW action series Nikita (2010–11), and served as a writer/producer in its second season (2011–12). He then became a writer/producer on the first season of the USA Network series Graceland in 2013. He was also a writer and Executive Producer on the AMC drama series Turn: Washington's Spies, a fictionalized account of the Culper Spy Ring masterminded by General George Washington during the American Revolutionary War, continuing with the series for all four seasons of its run. He was subsequently a writer and co-executive producer on the second season of Star Trek: Discovery.

Colville was a writer and Executive Producer on the first season of Severance on Apple TV+. He was nominated for a 2022 Primetime Emmy Award in the Best Drama Series category as one of the producers on Severance. He won the 2023 Writers Guild of America Awards for Best Drama Series and Best New Series along with the writing staff of Severance. He also won a 2022 Peabody Award for Severance.

Colville is currently a writer and executive producer on the Apple TV+ series Monarch: Legacy of Monsters. He produced the first season of the series in British Columbia in 2022, and the second in Australia from 2024/25. Monarch won the 2025 Saturn Award for Best Adventure Series.

== Biography ==
Colville joined the crew of AMC drama Mad Men for the third season in 2009. He co-wrote the episode "The Arrangements" with series creator and show runner Matthew Weiner. Colville and the writing staff won the Writers Guild of America (WGA) Award for Best Drama Series at the February 2010 ceremony for their work on the third season.

Colville is from Louisville, Kentucky. He graduated from Ballard High School. He attended Deep Springs College for two years and graduated with an AB in English literature from Harvard University. While at Harvard, he won a Fiske Scholarship to study at Trinity College, Cambridge and earned an M.Phil. in political philosophy. After Cambridge, he worked for D. E. Shaw & Co., setting up software subsidiary D.E. Shaw India in Hyderabad.

=== Accolades ===
Year	Award	Category	Nominee(s)	Result	Ref.
2022	Peabody Awards	Entertainment	Severance	Won	
