= Intelligence in the American Revolutionary War =

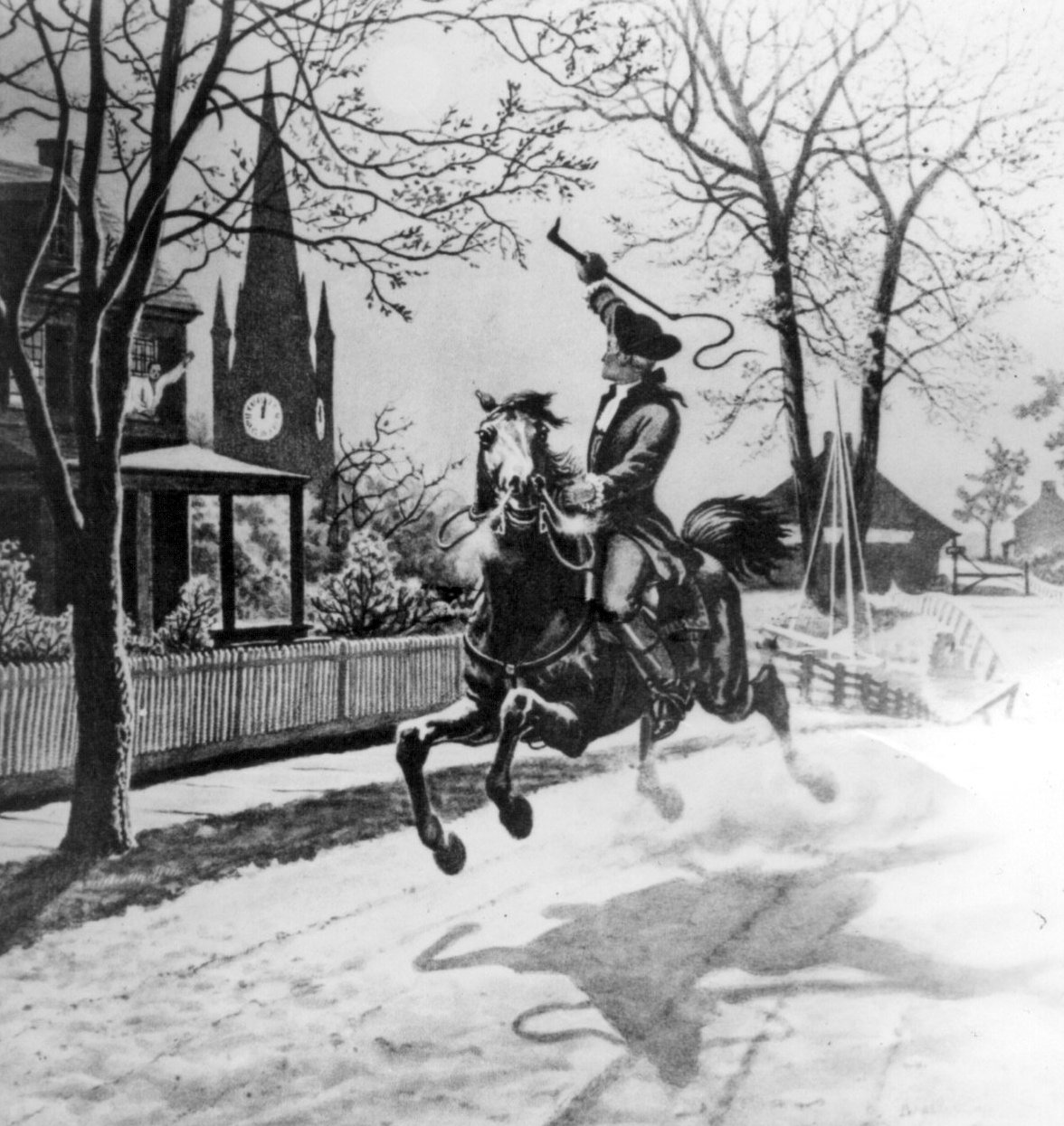
Paul Revere's midnight ride

During the American Revolutionary War, the Continental Army and British Army conducted espionage operations against one another to collect military intelligence to inform military operations. In addition, both sides conducted political action, covert action, counterintelligence, deception, and propaganda operations as part of their overall strategies.

American intelligence was monitored and sanctioned by the Continental Congress to provide military intelligence to the Continental Army to aid them in fighting the British during the American Revolutionary War. Congress created a Secret Committee for domestic intelligence, a Committee of Secret Correspondence for foreign intelligence, and a committee on spies, for tracking spies within the Patriot movement.

British espionage efforts were overseen by the British Army and focused primarily on gathering military intelligence to support military operations.

== American organizations involved in espionage ==
=== Secret Committee ===
The Second Continental Congress created a Secret Committee on September 18, 1775. The committee was not, however, a true intelligence agency, since the Committee of Secret Correspondence with which it often worked was mainly concerned with obtaining military supplies in secret and distributing them, and selling gunpowder to privateers chartered by the Congress. The committee also took over and administered on a uniform basis the secret contracts for arms and gunpowder previously negotiated by certain members of Congress without the formal sanction of that body. The Committee kept its transactions secret and destroyed many of its records to ensure the confidentiality of its work.

The Secret Committee employed agents overseas, often in cooperation with the Committee of Secret Correspondence. It gathered intelligence about secret Loyalist ammunition stores and arranged to seize them. The committee also sent missions to seize British supplies in the Southern Colonies. It arranged the purchase of military stores through intermediaries to conceal the fact that Congress was the true purchaser. They then used foreign flags to attempt to protect the vessels from the British fleet.

The members of the Continental Congress appointed to the Committee included some of the most influential and responsible members of Congress: Benjamin Franklin, Robert Morris, Robert Livingston, John Dickinson, Thomas Willing, Thomas McKean, John Langdon, and Samuel Ward.

=== Committee of (Secret) Correspondence ===
The Second Continental Congress recognized the need for foreign intelligence and foreign alliances and created the Committee of Correspondence (soon renamed the Committee of Secret Correspondence) by a resolution of November 29, 1775. The original Committee members—America's first foreign intelligence agency—were Benjamin Franklin, Benjamin Harrison, Thomas Johnson and subsequently included James Lovell, who became the Congress' expert on codes and ciphers and has been called the father of American cryptanalysis.

The committee employed secret agents abroad, conducted covert operations, devised codes and ciphers, funded propaganda activities, authorized the opening of private mail, acquired foreign publications for use in analysis, established a courier system, and developed a maritime capability apart from that of the Continental Navy, and engaged in regular communications with Britons and Scots who sympathized with the American cause. It met secretly in December 1775 with a French intelligence agent who visited Philadelphia undercover as a Flemish merchant.

On April 17, 1777, the Committee of Secret Correspondence renamed the Committee of Foreign Affairs but kept with its intelligence function. Matters of diplomacy were conducted by other committees or by Congress as a whole. On January 10, 1781, the Department of Foreign Affairs—the forerunner of the Department of State—was created and tasked with "obtaining the most extensive and useful information relative to foreign affairs", the head of which was empowered to correspond "with all other persons from whom he may expect to receive useful information."

=== Committee on Spies ===
On June 5, 1776, the Congress appointed John Adams, Thomas Jefferson, Edward Rutledge, James Wilson, and Robert Livingston "to consider what is proper to be done with persons giving intelligence to the enemy or supplying them with provisions." They were charged with revising the Articles of War regarding espionage directed against the American forces. The problem was an urgent one: Benjamin Church, chief physician of the Continental Army, had already been seized and imprisoned as a British agent, but there was no civilian espionage act, and George Washington thought the existing military law did not provide punishment severe enough to afford a deterrent. On November 7, 1775, the death penalty was added for espionage to the Articles of War, but the clause was not applied retroactively, and Church escaped execution. On August 21, 1776, the committee's report was considered by Congress, which enacted the first espionage act. It was resolved further that the act "be printed at the end of the rules and articles of war." On February 27, 1778, the law was broadened to include any "inhabitants of these states" whose intelligence activities aided the enemy in capturing or killing revolutionary forces.

== British organizations involved in espionage ==
Compared to American espionage efforts, British efforts were limited during the first four years of the war. General Henry Clinton was nominally in charge of the British Army's espionage efforts, which had minimal impact on British military operations. In May 1779, Clinton appointed his aide-de-camp John André as the head of British espionage operations in North America. André began to develop a more formalized espionage apparatus, including creating a spy network that expanded outside New York City and employed cipher codes to protect communications with spies.

== Counterintelligence ==
Probably the first organization under the Articles of Confederation created for counterintelligence purposes was the Committee for Detecting and Defeating Conspiracies, later the commission. It was made up of a series of groups established in New York between June 1776 and January 1778 to collect intelligence, apprehend British spies and couriers, and examine suspected British sympathizers. It was created as a "secret service" which had the power to arrest, convict, to grant bail, parole, or imprison or deport. A company of militia was placed under its command. The Committee heard over 500 cases involving disloyalty and subversion. John Jay has been called the first chief of American counterintelligence because of his role in the committee.

William Duer, a New York planter and politician, and Nathaniel Sackett, an agent suggested by Duer to George Washington, were particularly successful in ferreting out British agents, but found their greatest success in the missions of one of the dozen or so agents of their own, Enoch Crosby. Crosby, a veteran of the Continental Army, had been mistaken by a Westchester County Loyalist as being someone who shared his views. He confided to Crosby that a secret enemy military company was being formed and introduced him to the group. Crosby reported the plot to the committee and was taken with the group. He managed to "escape" and, as directed, infiltrated another secret Tory unit. This unit, including Crosby, was also taken and escaped once more. He repeated the operation at least two more times before the loyalists started to get wise to his "escaping" and he retired. Crosby was the model for the central character in James Fenimore Cooper's book The Spy (1821), the first espionage novel written in English.

Another successful American agent was Captain David Gray from the Province of Massachusetts Bay. Posing as a deserter, Gray entered the service of Colonel Beverly Robinson, a Tory intelligence officer, and became Robinson's courier. As a result, the contents of each of Robinson's dispatches were read by the Americans before their delivery. Gray eventually became the courier for Major Oliver DeLancey Jr., the head of the British secret service in New York. For two years, Gray, as DeLancey's courier to Canada, successfully penetrated the principal communications link of the British secret service. Upon completing his assignment, Gray returned to the ranks of the Continental Army, and his name was struck from the deserter list, where it had been placed at the beginning of the operation.

Major Benjamin Tallmadge, a senior intelligence officer under Continental Army commander George Washington, played a key role in the capture of Major John André, who preceded DeLancey as chief of the British secret service in New York. Although he declined to discuss the episode in his memoirs, it is said that one of Tallmadge's agents had reported to him that Major André was in contact with a "John Anderson" who was expecting the surrender of a major installation. Learning that a certain John Anderson had been captured by three Militiamen, Tallmadge hurried to the post where André was being held. John Paulding, Isaac Van Wert, and David Williams had been on sentry trying to catch loyalist "Cow-Boys" that had been preying on people in Westchester County, New York.

André mistakenly assumed that the men were aligned with the British and declared himself to be a British officer. Then, upon realizing the mistake, he tried to use a pass provided by Arnold. They searched André and found papers hidden in his socks. Paulding understood the papers revealed "Anderson" to be a spy and stated that no amount of money would be enough to let André go. As Tallmadge arrived at the post, he found that the acting Post Commander had sent André, under guard, back to General Arnold. After extensive and animated lobbying by Tallmadge, the commander, Jamieson, ordered that "Anderson" be returned for interrogation. "Anderson" admitted to his true identity (that he was André) and was tried, convicted, and executed as a spy. Arnold, learning that André had been taken and that his treachery was no doubt exposed, fled West Point before he could be captured, and joined the British forces.

General Washington demanded effective counterintelligence work from his subordinates. On March 24, 1776, for example, he wrote: "There is one evil I dread, and that is, their spies. I could wish, therefore, the most attentive watch be kept... I wish a dozen or more of honest, sensible, and diligent men, were employed... to question, cross-question, etc., all such persons as are unknown, and cannot give an account of themselves in a straight and satisfactory line... I think it a matter of importance to prevent them from obtaining intelligence of our situation."

Washington occasionally had to deal with rogue intelligence officers in his ranks who used their positions for personal gain or undertook unauthorized or illegal operations that might have compromised parts of his intelligence apparatus. Once Washington discovered that two of his agents who supposedly were collecting intelligence on Long Island were "mere plundering parties." He set up a special team to investigate and arrest the renegade operatives.

== Techniques ==
=== Foreign intelligence ===
The first intelligence agent enlisted by the Secret Correspondence Committee was Arthur Lee, then living in London. On November 30, 1775, the day after its founding, the Committee appointed Lee as its agent in England and told him that "it is considered of the utmost consequence to the cause of liberty that the Committee is kept informed of developments in Europe." Following the first Congressional appropriation for the work of the Committee on December 11, 1775, two hundred pounds was forwarded to Lee with the urging that he finds out the "disposition of foreign powers towards us, and the admonition that we need not hint that great circumspection and impenetrable security are necessary."

The next agent recruited abroad by the committee was Charles W. F. Dumas, a Swiss journalist at The Hague. Dumas was briefed personally by Thomas Story, a courier of the committee, and instructed on the use of cover names and letter drops to be used for his reports to the committee and communication with Lee in London. He also planted stories in a Dutch newspaper, Gazette de Leide, intended to give the United States a favorable rating in Dutch credit markets.

On March 1, 1776, the Committee appointed Silas Deane, a former delegate to Congress and future ambassador to France, as its agent there. He was instructed to pose as a Bermudian merchant dealing in Indian goods. He was also charged with making secret purchases and with attempting to gain secret assistance from the French crown. Later, both Deane and Lee would be converted from agents to commissioners to the French Crown, albeit secret ones, until the open and formal alliance of France with the Americans.

Other agents of the Committee included William Bingham, who served first in France and then in Martinique, where he had once been British Consul; Major Jonathan Loring Austin, William Carmichael, and William Hodge.

=== Secrecy and protection ===
The Committee of Secret Correspondence insisted that matters about the funding and instruction of intelligence agents be held within the committee. In calling for the Committee members to "lay their proceedings before Congress," the Congress, by resolution, authorized "withholding the names of the persons they have employed, or with whom they have corresponded." On May 20, 1776, when the committee's proceedings—with the sensitive names removed—were finally read in the Congress, it was "under the injunction of secrecy." The Continental Congress, recognizing the need for secrecy regarding foreign intelligence, foreign alliances, and military matters, maintained "Secret Journals," apart from its public journals, to record its decisions in such matters. On November 9, 1775, the Continental Congress adopted its oath of secrecy, one more stringent than the oaths of secrecy it would require of others in sensitive employment. On June 12, 1776, the Continental Congress adopted the first secrecy agreement for employees of the new government. The required oath read:

I do solemnly swear, that I will not directly or indirectly divulge any manner or thing which shall come to my knowledge as (clerk, secretary) of the board of War and Ordnance for the United Colonies... So help me God.

The Continental Congress, sensitive to the vulnerability of its covert allies, respected their desire for strict secrecy. Even after France declared war against England, the fact of French involvement before that time remained a state secret. When Thomas Paine, in a series of letters to the press in 1777, divulged details of the secret aid from the files of the Committee of Foreign Affairs (formerly, the Committee of Secret Correspondence), France's Minister to the United States, Conrad Alexandre Gérard de Rayneval, protested to the president of the Congress that Paine's indiscreet assertions "bring into question the dignity and reputation of the King, my master, and that of the United States." Congress dismissed Paine, and by public resolution denied having received such aid, resolving that "His Most Christian Majesty, the great and generous ally of the United States, did not preface his alliance with any supplies whatever sent to America."

In 1779, George Washington and John Jay, the president of the Continental Congress and a close associate of the Commander in Chief's on intelligence matters, disagreed about the effect disclosure of some intelligence would have on sources and methods. Washington wanted to publicize certain encouraging information that he judged would give "a certain spring to our affairs" and bolster public morale. Jay replied that the intelligence "is unfortunately of such a Nature, or rather so circumstanced, as to render Secrecy necessary." Jay prevailed.

=== Cover ===
Robert Townsend, an important American agent in the British-occupied city of New York, used the guise of being a merchant, as did Silas Deane when he was sent to France by the Committee of Secret Correspondence. Townsend was usually referred to by his cover name of "Culper, Junior." When Major Benjamin Tallmadge, who directed Townsend's espionage work, insisted that he disengage himself from his cover business to devote more time to intelligence gathering, General Washington overruled him. Townsend also was the silent partner of a coffee house frequented by British officers, an ideal place for hearing loose talk that was of value to the American cause.

Major John Clark's agents in and around British-controlled Philadelphia used several covers (farmer, peddler, and smuggler, among others) so effectively that only one or two operatives may have been detained. The agents traveled freely in and out of Philadelphia and passed intelligence to Washington about British troops, fortifications, and supplies, and of a planned surprise attack.

Enoch Crosby, a counterintelligence officer, posed as an unsuspecting shoemaker (his civilian trade) to travel through southern New York state while infiltrating Loyalist cells. After the Tories started to suspect him when he kept "escaping" from the Americans, Crosby's superiors moved him to Albany, New York, where he resumed his undercover espionage.

John Honeyman, an Irish weaver who had offered to spy for the Americans, used several covers (butcher, Tory, British agent) to collect intelligence on British military activities in New Jersey. He participated in a deception operation that left the Hessians in Trenton unprepared for Washington's attack across the Delaware River on December 26, 1776.

=== Disguise ===
In January 1778, Nancy Morgan Hart, who was tall, muscular, and cross-eyed, disguised herself as a "touched" or emotionally disturbed man, and entered Augusta, Georgia, to obtain intelligence on British defenses. Her mission was a success. Later, when a group of Tories attacked her home to gain revenge, she captured them all and was witness to their execution.

In June 1778, General Washington instructed Henry "Light Horse Harry" Lee to send an agent into the British fort at Stony Point, New York, to gather intelligence on the exact size of the garrison and the progress it was making in building defenses. Captain Allan McLane took the assignment. Dressing as a country bumpkin and utilizing the cover of escorting a Mrs. Smith into the fort to see her sons, McLane spent two weeks collecting intelligence within the British fort and returned safely.

While serving in Paris as an agent of the Committee of Secret Correspondence, Silas Deane is known to have used a heat-developing invisible ink—a compound of cobalt chloride, glycerine, and water—for some of his intelligence reports back to America. Even more useful to him later was a "sympathetic stain" created for secret communications by James Jay, a physician and the brother of John Jay. Jay, who had been knighted by George III, used the "stain" for reporting military information from London to America. Later he supplied quantities of the stain to George Washington at home and to Silas Deane in Paris.

The stain required one chemical for writing the message and a second to develop it, affording greater security than the ink used by Deane earlier. Once, in a letter to John Jay, Robert Morris spoke of an innocuous letter from "Timothy Jones" (Deane) and the "concealed beauties therein," noting "the cursory examinations of a sea captain would never discover them but transferred from his hand to the penetrating eye of a Jay, the diamonds stand confessed at once."

Washington instructed his agents in the use of the "sympathetic stain," noting in connection with "Culper Junior" that the ink "will not only render his communications less exposed to detection, but relieve the fears of such persons as may be entrusted in its conveyance." Washington suggested that reports could be written in invisible ink "on the blank leaves of a pamphlet... a common pocket book, or on the blank leaves at each end of registers, almanacs, or any publication or book of small value."

Washington especially recommended that agents conceal their reports by using the ink in correspondence: "A much better way is to write a letter in the Tory stile with some mixture of family matters and between the lines and on the remaining part of the sheet communicate with the Stain the intended intelligence."

Even though the Patriots took great care to write sensitive messages in invisible ink, or code or cipher, it is estimated that the British intercepted and decrypted over half of America's secret correspondence during the war.

=== Codes and ciphers ===
American Revolutionary leaders used various methods of cryptography to conceal diplomatic, military, and personal messages.

John Jay and Arthur Lee devised dictionary codes in which numbers referred to the page and line in an agreed-upon dictionary edition where the plaintext (unencrypted message) could be found.

In 1775, Charles Dumas designed the first diplomatic cipher that the Continental Congress and Benjamin Franklin used to communicate with agents and ministers in Europe. Dumas's system substituted numbers for letters in the order in which they appeared in a preselected paragraph of French prose containing 682 symbols. This method was more secure than the standard alphanumeric substitution system, in which a through z are replaced with 1 through 26 because each letter in the plain text could be replaced with more than one number.

The Culper Spy Ring used a numerical substitution code developed by Major Benjamin Tallmadge, the network's leader. The Ring began using the code after the British captured some papers indicating that some Americans around New York were using "sympathetic stain." Tallmadge took several hundred words from a dictionary and several dozen names of people or places and assigned each a number from 1 to 763. For example, 38 meant to attack, 192 stood for the fort, George Washington was identified as 711, and New York was replaced by 727. An American agent posing as a deliveryman transmitted the messages to other members of the Ring. One of them, Anna Strong (spy), signaled the message's location with a code involving laundry hung out to dry. A black petticoat indicated that a message was ready to be picked up, and the number of handkerchiefs identified the cove on Long Island Sound where the agents would meet. By the end of the war, several prominent Americans—among them Robert Morris, John Jay, Robert Livingston, and John Adams—were using other versions of numerical substitution codes.

The Patriots had two notable successes in breaking British ciphers. In 1775, Elbridge Gerry and the team of Elisha Porter and the Rev. Samuel West, working separately at Washington's direction, decrypted a letter that implicated Benjamin Church, the Continental Army's chief surgeon, in espionage for the British.

In 1781, James Lovell, who designed cipher systems used by several prominent Americans, determined the encryption method that British commanders used to communicate with each other. When a dispatch from Lord Cornwallis in Yorktown, Virginia, to General Henry Clinton in New York was intercepted, Lovell's cryptanalysis enabled Washington to gauge how desperate Cornwallis's situation was and to time his attack on the British lines. Soon after, another decrypt by Lovell provided a warning to the French fleet off Yorktown that a British relief expedition was approaching. The French scared off the British flotilla, sealing the victory for the Americans.

=== Intercepting communications ===
The Continental Congress regularly received quantities of intercepted British and Tory mail. On November 20, 1775, it received some intercepted letters from Cork, Ireland, and appointed a committee made up of John Adams, Benjamin Franklin, Thomas Johnson, Robert Livingston, Edward Rutledge, James Wilson and George Wythe "to select such parts of them as may be proper to publish." The Congress later ordered a thousand copies of the portions selected by the committee to be printed and distributed. A month later, when another batch of intercepted mail was received, a second committee was appointed to examine it. Based on its report, Congress resolved that "the contents of the intercepted letters this day read, and the steps which Congress may take in consequence of said intelligence thereby given, be kept secret until further orders." By early 1776, abuses were noted in the practice, and Congress resolved that only the councils or committees of the safety of each colony, and their designees, could henceforth open the mail or detain any letters from the post.

When Moses Harris reported that the British had recruited him as a courier for their Secret Service, General Washington proposed that General Schuyler "contrive a means of opening them without breaking the seals, take copies of the contents, and then let them go on. By these means, we should become masters of the whole plot." From that point on, Washington was privy to British intelligence pouches between New York and Canada.

=== Technology ===
James Jay used the advanced technology of his time in creating the invaluable "sympathetic stain" used for secret communications. Perhaps the American Patriots' most advanced application of technology was in David Bushnell's Turtle, a one-man submarine created for affixing watchword-timed explosive charges to the bottoms of enemy ships.

The "turtle," now credited with being the first use of the submarine in warfare, was an oaken chamber about five and a half feet (1.7 m) wide and seven feet (2.1 m) high. It was propelled by a front-mounted, pedal-powered propeller at a speed of up to three miles per hour (4.8 km/h), had a barometer to read depth, a pump to raise or lower the submarine through the water, and provision for both lead and water ballast.

When Bushnell learned that the candle used to illuminate instruments inside the "turtle" consumed the oxygen in its air supply, he turned to Benjamin Franklin for help. The solution: the phosphorescent weed, foxfire. Heavy tides thwarted the first sabotage operation. A copper-clad hull that could not be penetrated by the submarine's auger foiled the second. (The "turtle" did blow up a nearby schooner, however.) The secret weapon would almost certainly have achieved success against a warship if it had not gone to the bottom of the Hudson River when the mother ship to which it was moored was sunk by the British in October 1776.

An early device developed for concealing intelligence reports when traveling by water was a simple weighted bottle that could be dropped overboard if there was a threat of capture. This was replaced by a wafer-thin leaden container in which a message was sealed. It would sink in water, melt in a fire, and could be used by agents on land or water. It had one drawback—lead poisoning if it was swallowed. It was replaced by a silver, bullet-shaped container that could be unscrewed to hold a message and which would not poison a courier who might be forced to swallow it.

=== Deception operations ===
To offset British superiority in firepower and number of troops, General Washington made frequent use of deception and disinformation. He allowed fabricated documents to fall into the hands of enemy agents or be discussed in their presence. He allowed couriers carrying bogus information to be "captured" by the British, and inserted forged documents in intercepted British communications that were then permitted to continue to their destination. He had army procurement officers make false purchases of large quantities of supplies in places picked to convince the British that a sizable rebel force was massing. Washington even had fake military facilities built. In all this, he managed to make the British believe that his three-thousand-man army outside Philadelphia was forty thousand strong.

After learning from the Culper Ring that the British planned to attack a French expedition that had just landed in Newport, Rhode Island, Washington planted information with known British agents indicating that he intended to move against New York City. The British commander held back the troops headed for Rhode Island. With elaborate deception, Washington masked his movement toward the Chesapeake Bay and Yorktown by convincing the British that he was moving on to New York.

At Yorktown, James Armistead, a slave who had joined Lafayette's service with his master's permission, crossed into Cornwallis' lines in the guise of an escaped slave, and was recruited by Cornwallis to return to American lines as a spy. Lafayette gave him a fabricated order that was destined for a large number of nonexistent replacements. Armistead delivered the bogus order in crumpled, dirty condition to Cornwallis, claiming to have found it along the road during his mission. Cornwallis believed him and did not learn he had been tricked until after his surrender. Armistead was granted his freedom by the Virginia General Assembly as a result of this and other wartime services.

Another deception operation at Yorktown found Charles Morgan entering Cornwallis' camp as a deserter. When debriefed by the British, he convinced them that Lafayette had sufficient boats to move all his troops against the British in one landing operation. Cornwallis was duped by him and dug in rather than marched out of Yorktown. Morgan, in turn, escaped in a British uniform and returned to the American lines with five British deserters and a prisoner.

=== Propaganda ===
Upon receiving accurate intelligence that the British were hiring Hessian auxiliaries for service in America, Congress appointed a three-man committee "to devise a plan for encouraging the Hession and other foreigners... to quit that iniquitous service." The result was a resolution, believed to have been drafted by Thomas Jefferson, offering land grants to German deserters. It was translated into German and sent to the Hessians.

Benjamin Franklin, who joined the committee to implement the operation, arranged for the leaflets to be disguised as tobacco packets to make sure they would fall into the hands of ordinary Hessian soldiers. Christopher Ludwick was dispatched by Washington into the enemy camp, posing as a deserter, to contact the Hessians and encourage them to defect. He is credited with the defection of "many hundred soldiers" from the German ranks.

In 1777, after he arrived in France, Benjamin Franklin fabricated a letter purportedly sent by a German prince to the commander of his troops in America. The letter disputed British casualty figures for the German troops, arguing that the actual number was much higher and that he was entitled to a great amount of "blood money", the amount paid to the prince for each of his men killed or wounded. The prince also encouraged the officer to be humane and to allow his wounded to die, rather than try to save men who might only become cripples unfit for service to their prince.

Between 5,000 and 6,000 Hessians deserted to the American side during the war, in part because of US propaganda. Franklin also wrote a fake newspaper report which purported to detail the transmittal of American scalps to the governor of Canada by British-allied Indians. The Indian transmittal letter was intended to be published in Britain with the aim of making the British public more amenable to peace negotiations with the United States.

== Intelligence analysis and estimates ==
On May 29, 1775, the Continental Congress received the first of many intelligence estimates prepared in response to questions it posed to military commanders. The report estimated the size of the enemy force to be encountered in an attack on New York, the number of Continental troops needed to meet it, and the kind of force needed to defend the other New England colonies.

An example of George Washington's interest in intelligence analysis and estimates can be found in instructions he wrote to General Putnam in August 1777: "Deserters and people of that class always speak of number. ... Indeed, scarce any person can form a judgment unless he sees the troops paraded and can count the divisions. But, if you can by any means obtain a list of the regiments left upon the island, we can compute the number of men within a few hundred, over or under." On another occasion, in thanking James Lovell for a piece of intelligence, Washington wrote: "It is by comparing a variety of information, we are frequently enabled to investigate facts, which were so intricate or hidden, that no single clue could have led to the knowledge of them. ... Intelligence becomes interesting which but from its connection and collateral circumstances, would not be important."

Colonel David Henley, Washington's intelligence chief for a short period in 1778, received these instructions when he wrote to Washington for guidance: "Besides communicating your information as it arises. ... you might make out a table or something in the way of columns, under which you might range, their magazines of forage, grain and the like, the different corps and regiments, the Works, were thrown up, their connexion, kind and extent, the officers commanding, with the numbers of guns &ca. &ca. This table should comprehend in one view all that can be learned from deserters, spies and persons who may come out from the enemy's boundaries." (It was common practice to interrogate travelers from such British strongholds as New York, Boston, and Philadelphia.)

== Political action ==
=== France ===
While intelligence committees of the Continental Congress were meeting in Philadelphia, Arthur Lee was meeting in London with Pierre-Augustin Caron de Beaumarchais, the successful author of Le Barbier de Séville who was a French agent. Lee's inflated reports of patriot strength, which either he fabricated for Beaumarchais' benefit or were provided by Lee's regular correspondent, Samuel Adams, won the Frenchman to the American cause. Beaumarchais repeatedly urged the French Court to give immediate assistance to the Americans, and on February 29, 1776, addressed a memorial to King Louis XVI quoting Lee's offer of a secret long-term treaty of commerce in exchange for secret aid to the war of independence. Beaumarchais explained that France could grant such aid without compromising itself, but urged that "success of the plan depends wholly upon rapidity as well as secrecy: Your Majesty knows better than any one that secrecy is the soul of business, and that in politics a project once disclosed is a project doomed to failure."

With the memorial, Beaumarchais submitted a plan proposing that he set up a commercial trading firm as a cover for the secret aid; he requested and was granted one million livres to establish a firm called Roderigue Hortalez et Cie for that purpose. Beaumarchais' memorial was followed by one of March 12, 1776, by the French Minister of Foreign Affairs, the Comte de Vergennes. Royal assent was granted, and by the time Silas Deane arrived in Paris, French arms and other aid was on its way to the revolutionaries. Deane expanded the relationship, working with Beaumarchais and other French merchants to procure ships, commission privateers, recruit French officers, and purchase French military supplies declared "surplus" for that purpose.

On September 26, 1776, the Congress elected three commissioners to the Court of France—Benjamin Franklin, Thomas Jefferson, and Silas Deane—resolving that "secrecy shall be observed until further Order of Congress; and that until permission be obtained from Congress to disclose the particulars of this business, no member be permitted to say anything more upon this subject, than that Congress have taken such steps as they judged necessary for the purpose of obtaining foreign alliance." Because of his wife's illness, Jefferson could not serve, and Arthur Lee was appointed in his stead.

With Franklin's arrival in France on November 29, 1776—the first anniversary of the founding of the Committee of Secret Correspondence—the French mission became an intelligence and propaganda center for Europe, an unofficial diplomatic representation, a coordinating facility for aid from America's secret allies, and a recruiting station for such French officers as Lafayette and Johann de Kalb. In October 1777 the Continental Army won a crucial victory over the British at Saratoga, and on February 6, 1778, the French-American treaty of alliance was signed. On March 30, 1778, Franklin, Lee, and Deane were received at the French Court as representatives of the United States of America, and on July 7 Comte d'Estaing's fleet cast anchor in the Delaware River. France was now in the war; the mission to Paris had succeeded.

=== Spain and its colonies ===
Spain, at the urging of Vergennes, matched France's one million lives for the operation of Hortalez et Cie. But that was not the beginning of secret Spanish aid. During the summer of 1776 Luis de Unzaga y Amezaga, the governor of New Spain at New Orleans, had privately delivered five tons of gunpowder, out of the King's stores, to Captain George Gibson and Lieutenant Linn of the Virginia Council of Defense. The gunpowder moved up the Mississippi River under the protection of the flag of Spain and was used to thwart British plans to capture Fort Pitt.

Oliver Pollock, a New Orleans businessman, had interceded on behalf of the Virginians. When Bernardo de Galvez became governor of New Orleans, Pollock—who was soon appointed an agent of the Secret Committee there—worked closely with the young officer to provide additional supplies to the Americans. Galvez also agreed to grant protection to American ships while seizing British ships as smugglers and to allow American privateers to sell their seized wares at New Orleans. Havana, too, became a focal point for dispensing secret Spanish aid to the Americans. From Galvez, the revolutionaries received gunpowder and supplies for the George Rogers Clark expedition, and from Galvez' secret service fund came to the funds used by Colonel Clark for the capture of Kaskaskia and Vincennes. When Spain formally entered the war on the American side on June 21, 1779, Oliver Pollock—who suffered bankruptcy in funding the purchase of supplies for the cause of independence—rode as aide-de-camp to Galvez in the capture of Baton Rouge, Natchez, Mobile, and Pensacola.

=== The Caribbean ===
Another center of secret aid was St. Eustatia Island in the West Indies. A Dutch free port set in the midst of English, French, Danish and Spanish colonies, St. Eustatia (now Sint Eustatius) became—in the words of a British intelligence document of the period—"the rendezvous of everything and everybody meant to be clandestinely conveyed to America." It was a major source of gunpowder for the American cause, and perhaps the safest and quickest means of communications between American representatives and agents abroad and with the Congress and others at home.

== Covert action ==
=== Bermuda ===
In July 1775 Benjamin Franklin and Robert Morris worked out a plan in collaboration with Colonel Henry Tucker, the head of a distinguished Bermuda family, to obtain the store of gunpowder in the Royal Naval Dockyard, Bermuda. To give Bermuda much-needed food in exchange for the powder, Congress resolved on July 15, 1775, to permit the exchange of food for guns and gunpowder brought by any vessel to an American port. On the night of August 14, 1775, two American ships kept a rendezvous with Colonel Tucker's men off the coast of Bermuda and sent a raiding party ashore. An American sailor was lowered into the arsenal through an opening in the roof and opened the doors. The barrels of gunpowder were rolled to wait for Bermudian whaleboats and transported to the American ships. Twelve days later half of the powder was delivered to Philadelphia and a half to American forces at Charleston. America's second covert action effort ended in failure. General Washington, hearing independently of the Bermuda powder, dispatched ships to purchase or seize it. Lacking a centralized intelligence authority, he was unaware of the previous success; when Washington's ships arrived in Bermuda in October 1775, the gunpowder had been gone for two months and British ships patrolled Bermuda waters.

=== Canada ===
On the basis of information received by the Secret Correspondence Committee, on February 15, 1776, the Second Continental Congress, meeting in Philadelphia, authorized a covert action plan to urge the Canadians to become a "sister colony" in the struggle against the British. A French printer was dispatched to Canada "to establish a free press... for the frequent publication of such pieces as may be of service to the cause of the United Colonies."

Benjamin Franklin, Samuel Chase, and Charles Carroll were appointed from the Congress to undertake the mission, and Father John Carroll was invited to join the team to prevail upon the Catholic clergy of Canada. The delegation was given a degree of authority over American expeditionary forces in Canada; it was empowered to raise six companies in Canada, and to offer sanctuary in the thirteen colonies "for all those who have adhered to us." Excesses against the Canadian populace by the American military forces, the hostility of the clergy, and the inability of American commissioners to deliver little more than promises in exchange for Canadian defection, doomed the project. With the arrival of summer, both military and political action in Canada had ended in failure.

== Special operations ==
=== Benedict Arnold ===
After Benedict Arnold defected, several special operations, none successful, were mounted in an effort to capture him. In September 1780, Major Henry "Light-Horse Harry" Lee presented Washington with a plan to return the defector to American control and execute him. Washington approved the plan, but insisted that Arnold not be killed or injured in carrying it out, even at the risk of allowing him to escape. "Public punishment," said Washington, "is the sole object in view."

Lee's sergeant major, John Champe from Loudoun County, Virginia, was assigned to this special mission. On the evening of October 19, 1780, however, Champe deserted to the British under a hail of gunfire. The official documents he carried and his cooperative attitude during interrogation convinced the British he was a genuine deserter. He was appointed sergeant major of Benedict Arnold's legion, which included rebel deserters and Loyalists. Champe, now wearing a British uniform and having obtained freedom of movement in British-occupied New York City, made contact with American agents there and laid plans for Arnold's capture. Arnold's legion embarked for the Colony of Virginia on the night the operation was to take place, and the plan was aborted. Champe accomplished his other mission, namely finding out if other American officers were collaborating with the enemy. He found no evidence that any were.

In March 1781, an attempt to capture Arnold during his daily ride to the Chesapeake Bay in Virginia was foiled by the chance anchoring of some British ships in the area. A second plan, devised by Thomas Jefferson, called for General John Peter Muhlenberg to send hand-picked soldiers "to seize and bring off this greatest of traitors" at Portsmouth, Virginia. Unusual security precautions at the British outpost, however, thwarted the Jefferson plan.

=== Hostage taking ===
Recognizing the value of a royal hostage, Washington approved in 1782 a plan to capture the son of King George III - the Prince William (the future king, William IV) - during the young naval officer's posting to New York. The operation failed after British intelligence heard about it and the Prince increased security around himself. After William later became monarch, the American ambassador told him of the wartime plan and of Washington's edict that, if the mission were successful, the young Prince should suffer no "insult or indignity." Upon hearing the story, William IV responded: "I am obliged to General Washington for his humanity, but I'm damned glad I did not give him an opportunity of exercising it towards me."

=== Privateering ===
On the high seas, British supply ships and troop ships often fell to American privateers operating under letters of marque and reprisal from the Continental Congress. Franklin, for example, ran a flotilla of Irish and French privateers from the American mission in Paris. Success in intercepting British vessels was so great that the British accused their captains of taking bribes from the Americans to surrender their ships. One privateer, operating under contract to Silas Deane and a French business associate and utilizing a French ship obtained by Benjamin Franklin, was the Bonhomme Richard, commanded by John Paul Jones.

=== Sabotage ===
Only one sabotage mission is known to have been launched in England. Sometime after his arrival in Paris, Silas Deane was visited by a young man named James Aitken, recently returned from America. Aitken produced crudely drawn but accurate plans of the Royal Navy Dockyards in England and proposed to sabotage them by utilizing a unique incendiary device of his own design. Deane engaged his services and issued Aitken a passport signed by French Foreign Minister Vergennes with instructions to French officials: "We will and command you very expressly to let pass safely and freely, Mr. James Actzen, going to England, without giving him or suffering him any hindrance; but on the contrary giving every aid and assistance that he shall want or occasion for." In late November 1776 Aitken landed at Dover and, on December 7, he ignited a fire at the Portsmouth dockyard that burned from late in the afternoon until the following morning, destroying twenty tons of hemp, ten one-hundred-fathom (183 m) cables, and six tons of ship cordage. After failing to penetrate the security at Plymouth, Aitken proceeded to Bristol, where he destroyed two warehouses and several houses. On January 16, 1777, the British cabinet met in emergency session and urged immediate measures to locate the mysterious "John the Painter" (Aitken was a house painter). Guards were augmented at all military facilities and arsenals, and a reward was posted. By January 20 the cabinet, again in extraordinary session, discussed suspending habeas corpus and placing the country under martial law. Five days later the reward was increased to one thousand pounds, and newspapers reported panic throughout England. Aitken was soon apprehended, with a pistol and inflammables in his possession. He would not admit to the sabotage when interrogated, but eventually confided in a friendly American visitor who was secretly in the pay of the British. Based on these confidences, personal effects, including the passport from Vergennes, were located. His trial for arson in royal dockyards was speedy, and on March 10, 1777, Aitken went to the gallows at Portsmouth Dockyard, where his exploits had begun.

== Notable individuals involved in espionage during American Revolutionary War ==
- George Washington, Commander-in-Chief of the Continental Army, oversaw its espionage efforts
- Joseph Reed, Adjutant-General of the Continental Army, managed espionage operations
- Alexander Hamilton, chief staff aide to George Washington, managed espionage operations
- Elias Boudinot, Commissary General of Prisoners, involved in espionage operations
- Charles Scott, Brigadier General in the Continental Army, appointed as intelligence chief by Washington
- Benjamin Tallmadge, Continental Army officer, intelligence chief and leader of the Culper Ring
- Thomas Knowlton, Continental Army officer, commander of Knowlton's Rangers, a reconnaissance unit of the Continental Army
- Elias Dayton, Continental Army officer, involved in espionage operations
- John Clark, Continental Army officer, involved in espionage operations
- Allan McLane, Continental Army officer, involved in espionage operations
- Thomas Mifflin, Continental Army officer, involved in espionage operations
- Paul Revere, militia officer, involved in espionage operations
- Nathan Hale, Continental Army officer, captured and executed by British Army during espionage operation in New York City
- Haym Salomon, businessman, assisted Continental Army with espionage operations
- Abraham Woodhull, member of the Culper Ring, involved in espionage operations on Long Island
- Robert Townsend, member of the Culper Ring, involved in espionage operations in British-occupied New York City
- Sarah Townsend, member of the Culper Ring, sister of Robert Townsend and suspected informant and possible identity of Agent 355
- Elizabeth Burgin, worked under George Higday of the Culper Ring, helped over 200 prisoners of war escape British prison ships and possible identity of Agent 355
- Anna Strong, member of the Culper Ring, relayed signals to a courier on smuggling and military missions and possible identity of Agent 355
- Caleb Brewster, Continental Army officer and member of the Culper Ring, carried messages across Long Island Sound
- Major John André, British Army officer, head of its Secret Service in America during the American Revolutionary War. He was hanged as a spy by the Continental Army for assisting Benedict Arnold's attempted surrender.
- James Rivington, English-born American journalist in British-occupied New York City and likely member of the Culper Ring
- Hercules Mulligan, Irish-American tailor and spy
- William Heath, Continental Army officer, involved in espionage operations
- James Bowdoin, politician, assisted Continental Army with espionage operations
- Daniel Bissell, Continental Army and spy
- Lydia Darragh, Continental Army spy
- Ann Bates, Loyalist spy
- Joshua Mersereau, Mersereau Ring

== See also ==
- Culper Ring
