= Agent 355 =

18th century American spy

355 (died after 1780) was the supposed code name of a female spy during the American Revolution who was part of the Culper Ring spy network. She was one of the first spies for the United States, but her real identity is unknown. The number 355 could be decrypted from the system the Culper Ring used to mean "lady." Her story is considered part of national myth, as there is very little evidence that 355 even existed, although many continue to assert that she was a real historical figure.

== Biography ==
The only direct reference to 355 in any of the Culper Ring's missives (1778–1780) appears in a letter from Abraham Woodhull ("Samuel Culper Sr.") to General George Washington, where Woodhull describes her as "one who hath been ever serviceable to this correspondence."

Agent 355's contributions to the Culper Spy Ring were instrumental to its success. Operating within British-controlled territory, she gathered valuable intelligence on troop movements, supply routes, and strategic military plans. Female spies were often more successful as military men were looser-lipped with women than with men. Utilizing her discretion and resourcefulness, Agent 355 transmitted vital information to her handlers, enabling General George Washington to make informed decisions that often proved decisive on the battlefield. Although barred from military service, women actively contributed to the war efforts through espionage. When British soldiers lodged in colonial homes, some women seized the opportunity to gather intelligence, capitalizing on loose lips. Often, these female spies proved more adept at concealing their activities and achieving success than their male counterparts.

While the true identity of 355 remains unknown, some facts about her seem clear. She worked with the American Patriots during the Revolutionary War as a spy, and was likely recruited by Woodhull into the spy ring. The way the code is constructed indicates that she may have had "some degree of social prominence." She was likely living in New York City at the time, and at some point had contact with Major John André and Benedict Arnold. One person who has been named as the possible identity of Agent 355 is Anna Strong, Woodhull's neighbor. Strong was a crucial part of helping the Culper Ring by signaling to its members the location of Caleb Brewster, who raided British shipments in his whaleboat around Long Island Sound after he was given a secure location by Strong.Strong's method of communication was ingenious: she used her laundry as a signaling system. Hanging a black petticoat indicated that a message was ready for pickup, while the number of handkerchiefs corresponded to a secret pickup location. Abraham Woodhull, the leader of the Culper Ring operative, monitored her signals from his place next door and translated the messages. After deciphering the codes, he transported the information to Caleb Brewster, another Culper Ring operative. He transported the messages and rode for weeks to deliver the messages with the help of others, ensuring a clear passage for the couriers and indicating the message's retrieval point.

Another theory is that 355 may have been Robert Townsend's common-law wife. Stories about Townsend state that he was in love with 355. John Burke and Andrea Meyer have made a different case for 355's involvement in the spy ring, using circumstantial evidence that she may have been close to Major John André and also to Benjamin Tallmadge, thereby protecting Woodhull from accusations of being a spy. Other possible candidates for 355 include Sarah Horton Townsend and Elizabeth Burgin.

It is also occasionally believed that there was no Agent 355 at all, but rather that the code indicated a woman who had useful information but was not "formally connected to the ring." The code itself may have referred to "a woman", not an agent who was a woman.

355 is thought to have played a major role in exposing Arnold as a defector and in the arrest of André, who was hanged in Tappan, New York. She may have been a member of a prominent Loyalist family, which would have put her within easy reach of British commanders.

Another theory is that the then pregnant 355 was arrested in 1780 when Benedict Arnold defected to the Loyalists. She was imprisoned on HMS Jersey, a prison ship, where she may have given birth to a boy named Robert Townsend Jr. She later died on the prison ship. However, Alexander Rose disagrees with this narrative, stating that "females were not kept aboard prison ships," and that "there's no record whatsoever of a birth." Strengthening the idea that Agent 355 may have been Anna Strong is the fact that Anna's husband, Selah Strong, was imprisoned on Jersey and she was supposedly allowed to bring him food. Her presence on the ship may have led to the legend that Agent 355 was herself imprisoned there.

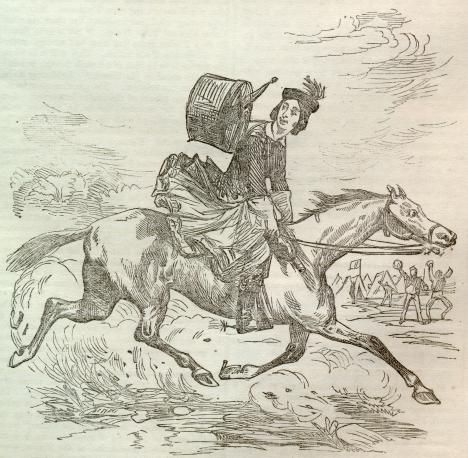
Depiction of a later female spy, Antonia Ford

== In popular culture ==
Agent 355 has become a part of popular fiction.

- One of the main characters in Y: The Last Man from Vertigo Comics is a modern spy that goes by Agent 355. She is part of a fictionalized Culper Ring that has remained active into modern times.
- Idara Victor plays fictional Agent 355 in the television series Turn: Washington's Spies. In the show, Agent 355 is the code name of a former slave named Abigail.
- In Season 4, Episode 6 (Identity Crisis) of the US TV show White Collar, the show's main characters investigate a Culper Ring conspiracy theory based on letters owned by a descendant of 355.
- Rebel Spy by Veronica Rossi, a young adult novel reimagining the story behind Agent 355, was published in 2020.
- The 355 is a female-led spy film released by Universal Pictures on January 7, 2022. A group of women from different international spy agencies create a faction code-named 355 in honor of Agent 355.

== See also ==
- Intelligence in the American Revolutionary War

== Footnotes ==
=== Sources ===
- Casey, Susan (2015). Women Heroes of the American Revolution. Chicago Review Press. ISBN 9781613745830.
- Kilmeade, Brian; Yaeger, Don (2013). George Washington's Secret Six: The Spy Ring That Saved the American Revolution. New York: Penguin. ISBN 9780698137653.
- Rose, Alexander (2006). Washington's Spies: The Story of America's First Spy Ring. New York: Bantam. ISBN 9780307418708.
