= Anna Strong =

Anna Strong may refer to:

- Anna Strong (spy) (1740–1812), part of Culper Spy Ring
- Anna Louise Strong (1885–1970), American journalist & activist
