= James Rivington =

American newspaper publisher (1724–1802)

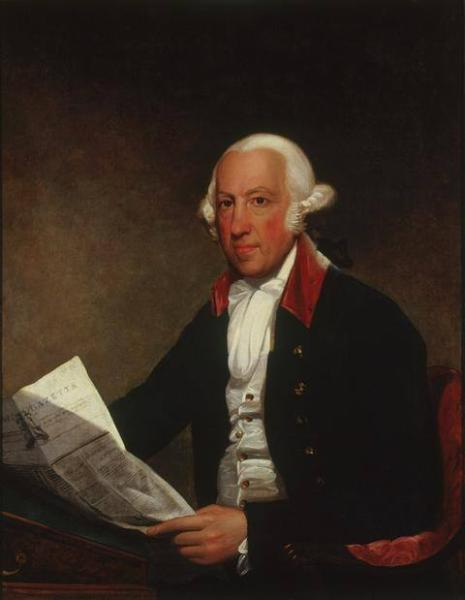
- Born: 1724; London, England
- Died: July 4, 1802 (aged 77); New York, New York
- Occupations: Spy, newspaper publisher
- Known for: Likely participation in the Culper Spy Ring

James Rivington (1724 – July 4, 1802) was an English-born American journalist who published a Loyalist newspaper in the American colonies called Rivington's Gazette. He was driven out of New York by the Sons of Liberty, but was likely a member of the American Culper Spy Ring, which provided the Continental Army with military intelligence from British-occupied New York.

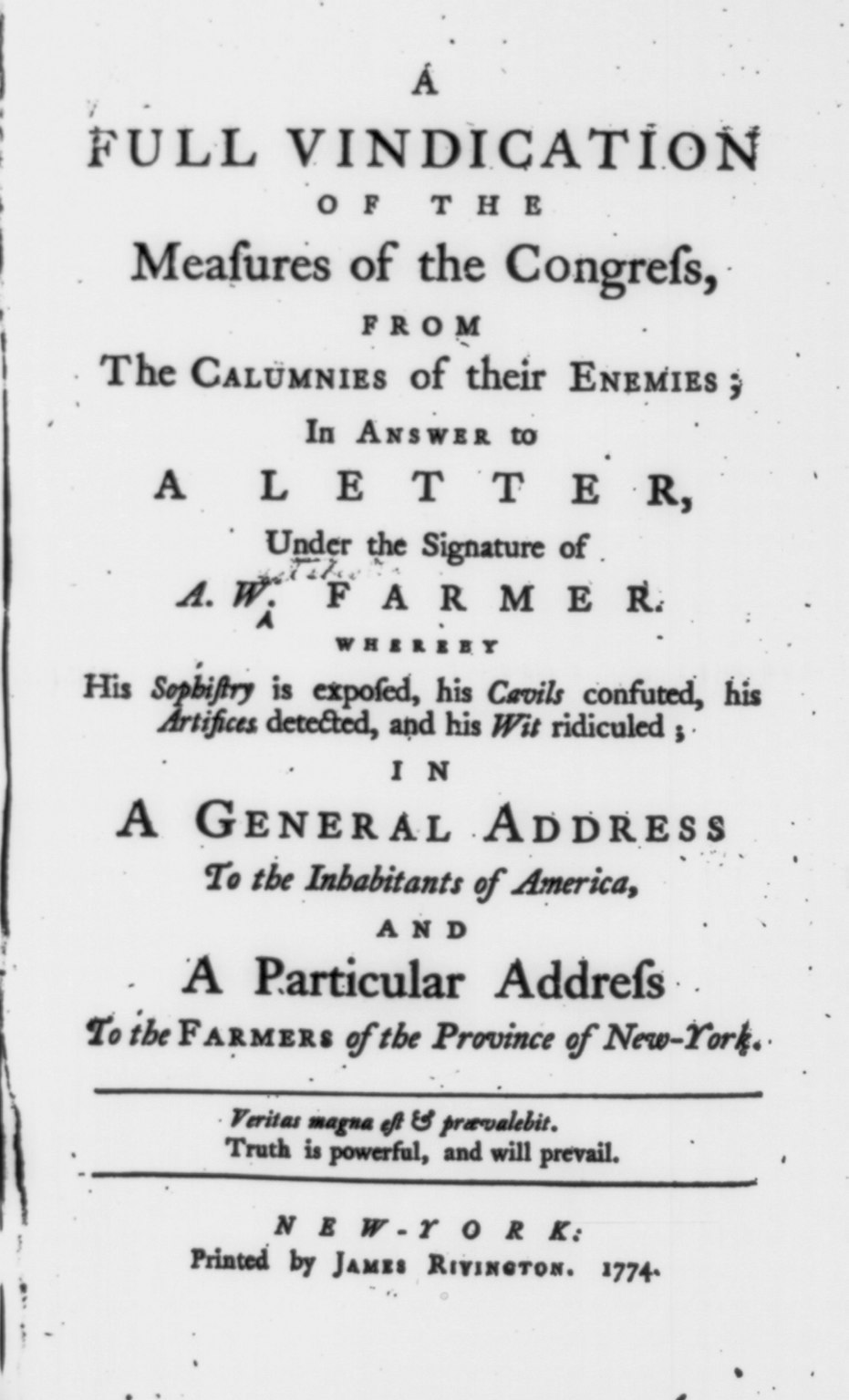
Title page of Alexander Hamilton's A Full Vindication of the Measures of Congress, printed by Rivington in 1774

== Early life ==
James Rivington was born in London in 1724. One of the sons of the bookseller and publisher Charles Rivington, he inherited a share of his father's business, which he lost at the Newmarket races. In 1760, he sailed to North America. He resumed his occupation in Philadelphia and the next year opened a printshop at the foot of Wall Street, New York.

In 1773, he began to publish a newspaper "at his ever open and uninfluenced press, Hanover Square." The first of a number of newspapers, The New York Gazetteer or the Connecticut, New Jersey, Hudson's River, and Quebec Weekly Advertiser, was issued in April 1773.

His initially-impartial stance shifted as a revolution loomed, and public opinion polarized, By late 1774, he was advocating the restrictive measures of the British government with such great zeal and attacking the Patriots so severely that in 1775, the Whigs of Newport, Rhode Island, resolved to hold no further communication with him. The Sons of Liberty hanged Rivington in effigy, and the Patriot poet Philip Freneau published a mock speech of Rivington's supposed contrition at his execution, which Rivington reprinted. He infuriated Captain Isaac Sears, the prominent patriot and Son of Liberty:

He would appear as a leading man amongst us, without perceiving that he is enlisted under a party as a tool of the lowest order; a political cracker, sent abroad to alarm and terrify, sure to do mischief to the cause he means to support, and generally finishing his career in an explosion that often bespatters his friends

== Family ==
His son Jonx was a lieutenant in the 83rd Regiment of Foot (Royal Glasgow Volunteers) and died in England in 1809. His son James was born in 1771 and was commissioned an Ensign in the 42nd or Royal Highland Regiment in 1783.

Rivington's great-nephew was Percy Rivington Pyne I, who emigrated from England in 1835 and became president of City National Bank in New York, a predecessor to Citigroup.

== Revolutionary War ==
In 1775, immediately after the opening of hostilities, Rivington's shop was burned and looted by the Sons of Liberty. Rivington fled to the harbor and boarded the British ship Kingfisher. Assistants continued to publish the Gazetteer, with a public assurance of Rivington's personal safety from the Committee-Chamber of New York, but Isaac Sears and other New York radicals entered Rivington's office, destroyed his press, and converted his lead type into bullets. Another mob that day burned Rivington's house to the ground. Rivington and his family sailed for England, where he was appointed King's printer for New York, at £100 per year.

In 1777, after the secure British occupation of that city, he returned with a new press and resumed the publication of his paper under the title of Rivington's New York Loyal Gazette, which he changed on 13 December 1777 to The Royal Gazette with the legend "Printer to the King's Most Excellent Majesty." On the day that Major John André was taken prisoner, his poem "Cow Chase" was published by Rivington.

== Role in Culper Spy Ring ==
Rivington, who opened a drug shop, would have been the last New Yorker suspected of playing the part of a spy for the Continentals, but he furnished General George Washington with important information. Rivington's silent partner in the coffeehouse was Robert Townsend, alias "Samuel Culper, Jr.," one of the principal agents of the American Culper Spy Ring. Rivington was recruited by Townsend in late summer 1779 and was given the code name "726." Rivington's communications were written on book cover boards so that no one would see them since they were bound in the covers of books, and were conveyed to the American camp by agents who were ignorant of their service.

The date of Rivington's secret change of heart is disputed, but when New York was evacuated in November 1783, Rivington remained in the city, much to the general surprise and anger of New Yorkers, who believed that "those who have been enriching themselves under the... government of George III shall never live peacably in New York." Removing the royal arms from his masthead, he changed the name of his business to Rivington's New York Gazette and Universal Advertiser. However, his business rapidly declined, and he was beaten up by the Sons of Liberty. His paper ceased to exist at the end of 1783, and he passed the remainder of his life in comparative poverty.

== Later life ==
Rivington, like other Loyalists, was denounced by the first generation of American chroniclers of the revolution. Ashbel Green described Rivington as "the greatest sycophant imaginable; very little under the influence of any principle but self-interest, yet of the most courteous manners to all with whom he had intercourse."

Alexander Graydon, in his Memoirs, wrote of Rivington: "This gentleman's manners and appearance were sufficiently dignified; and he kept the best company, He was an everlasting dabbler in theatrical heroics. Othello was the character in which he liked best to appear." His portrait, painted by Gilbert Stuart, was formerly in the possession of William H. Appleton, New York.

== Death and legacy ==
Rivington died in New York on July 4, 1802.

Rivington's name is commemorated in Rivington Street, Manhattan.

A complete set of his journal is conserved by the New-York Historical Society.

== In popular culture ==
- James Rivington is portrayed by actor John Carroll Lynch on the AMC period drama Turn: Washington's Spies. In the series he is portrayed as a staunch loyalist whose newspaper mocks the Patriot cause and makes light of the Continental losses.

== See also ==
- Early American publishers and printers
- Intelligence in the American Revolutionary War
- Intelligence operations in the American Revolutionary War
- Paul R. Misenick. The Original American Spies: Seven Covert Agents Of The Revolutionary War, North Carolina-McFarland Publishing, 2013

== Sources ==
- Kilmeade, Brian and Don Yaeger. George Washington's Secret Six: The Spy Ring That Save the American Revolution. New York: Penguin Group, 2013. ISBN 978-1-59523-103-1.
