= Shadow Patriots =

2005 novel by Lucia St. Clair Robson

- First edition
- Author: Lucia St. Clair Robson
- Language: English
- Genre: Historical novel
- Publisher: Forge Books (Tor)
- Publication date: 1 May 2005
- Publication place: United States
- Media type: Print (Hardcover)
- Pages: 336 pp (first edition, hardback)
- ISBN: 0-7653-0550-X (first edition, hardback)
- OCLC: 57352803
- Dewey Decimal: 813/.54 22
- LC Class: PS3568.O3185 S47 2005

Shadow Patriots is 2005 historical novel by American author Lucia St. Clair Robson. It tells of the Culper Ring, a group of George Washington's spies operating out of New York City during the Revolution. The story includes familiar names—Washington, Alexander Hamilton, Benedict Arnold, Peggy Shippen—and one unfamiliar number, the mysterious Spy 355. 355 was the Culpers' code for "lady," and after 225 years she remains a nameless heroine who, many historians believe, died for her country.

The Culpers transported their intelligence from British-occupied Manhattan to Setauket, then across Long Island Sound to Washington's troops in Connecticut. The book covers more than secret codes, invisible ink, double agents, and aliases. An estimated 11,500 American soldiers died in British custody here. "The prison ship martyrs," as they're called, are part of this story, as well as intrigue in Philadelphia, the battles of Brooklyn, Monmouth, and Stony Point, the betrayal of West Point, and the hardships of the winter encampments at Valley Forge and Morristown.
