= Albert S. Osborn =

American forensic scientist (1855–1946)

Albert Sherman Osborn
- Born: Albert Sherman John Paul Osborn; 1855
- Died: 1946 (aged 87–88)
- Known for: Pioneer and author in the field of Questioned Document Examination. Expert witness in many famous trials including People v. Molineux (168 N.Y. 264, 1899) and State v. Hauptmann (115 N.J.L. 412, 1935). Founding president of the ASQDE.
- Notable work: Various seminal textbooks in the area of QDE

Albert Sherman Osborn (1855-1946) is considered the father of the science of questioned document examination in North America.

His seminal book Questioned Documents was first published in 1910 and later heavily revised as a second edition in 1929. Other publications, including The Problem of Proof (1922), The Mind of the Juror (1937), and Questioned Document Problems (1944) were widely acclaimed by both the legal profession and by public and private laboratories concerned with matters involving questioned documents.

Osborn is also known for founding the American Society of Questioned Document Examiners (ASQDE) on September 2, 1942. In 1913 Osborn began inviting select practitioners to informal educational gatherings hosted in his home and those meetings eventually led to formation of the ASQDE. He became the society's first president and was involved intimately with the discipline and Society until his death four years later.

Osborn was involved in a number of high-profile cases during his time, including the murder of Mary Phagan and the Lindbergh kidnapping, the latter of which was featured in the film J. Edgar (2011), where Osborn is played by actor Denis O'Hare.

== Culper Spy Ring ==
In the late 1920s, Long Island historian, Morton Pennypacker, discovered similarities in the handwriting between Oyster Bay resident, Robert Townsend, and one of George Washington's spies referred to by the codename, Samuel Culper Junior. Pennypacker reached out to Osborn to confirm the letters were written by the same individual and, based on the handwriting samples Osborn was provided, Osborn confirmed that they were.

== Bibliography ==
1907 — Photography and Questioned Documents, 43p., Rochester, NY, TR800.O6
1908 — Ink and Questioned Documents, 19 p., The Genesee Press, Rochester, NY, HV8076.O73
1908 — Typewriting as evidence, 23 p., The Genee Press, Rochester, NY, KF8947.Z9 O8
1910 — Questioned Documents, The Lawyers' Co-operative Publishing Co.
1912 — Proof of Handwriting, 16 p., ISBN 1-120-86446-1
1922 — The Problem of Proof, 526p., Matthew Bender Co., Albany, NY
1922 — The Problem of Proof (2nd ed.), 539p., Essex Press in Newark, NJ
1929 — Questioned Documents (2nd ed.), 1042 p., Boyd printing company, Sweet & Maxwell, Albany, NY, KF8947.O83 1929b
1937 — The Mind of the Juror as Judge of the Facts, or, the Layman's View of the Law, Hardcover, 239 p., William S. Hein & Company, ISBN 0-8377-0926-1
1944 — Questioned Document Problems
1946 — Questioned Document Problems (2nd ed.), 569 p., Boyd printing company in Albany, N.Y., HV8074.O87 1946
