= Austin Roe =

American Revolutionary War spy (1748–1830)

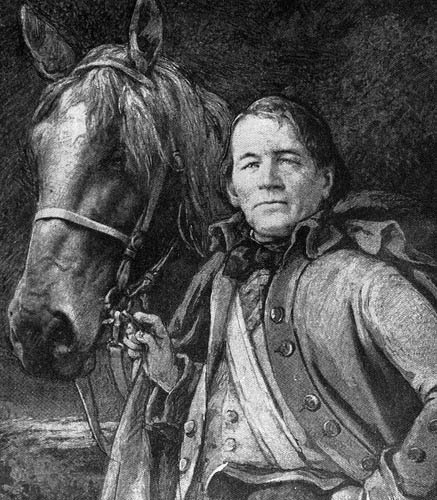
- Artistic depiction of Roe
- Born: March 2, 1748; Setauket, Province of New York, British America
- Died: November 28, 1830 (aged 82); Patchogue, New York, United States
- Burial place: Cedar Grove Cemetery, Patchogue
- Occupation: Woodworker
- Children: 8
- Espionage activity
- Allegiance: United States
- Codename: Agent 724
- Operations: Culper Ring

Austin Roe (March 2, 1748 – November 28, 1830) was a member of the Culper Ring, a spy network during the American Revolutionary War that was organized in 1778 by George Washington.

== Early life ==
Austin Roe was born March 2, 1748, in Port Jefferson, New York. He married Catherine Jones, and the couple had eight children. His great-grandson, Justus Roe, was the inventor of the modern day retractable carpenter's tape measure.

== Career ==
Roe was a woodworker by trade, referred to as a "joiner" or "cabinetmaker" on legal documents he attested to. Surviving references to his work in account books and on receipts, provide evidence that he built various wood products, like window sashes, chairs, tables, and coffins.

Though once thought to be the owner of a tavern in East Setauket, no primary sources support this fact. President George Washington stayed overnight during his 1790 tour of Long Island and was explicit that it was not a tavern in his description of it.

== Culper ring ==
=== Background ===
In December 1778, General George Washington's chief of intelligence—and Culper Ring spymaster Major Benjamin Tallmadge—recruited Jonas Hawkins as a clandestine courier to bring messages to Setauket from New York City, where the group's leader, Abraham Woodhull was gathering information. From there, the coded correspondence could be relatively easily forwarded to Tallmadge. At first, the ring employed just Hawkins in the role, but by early summer, Roe had joined the group as an alternate rider, who would take messages the 55 miles (89 km) between the group's two major centers of operation, Setauket, New York, and New York City. At the time, both cities were occupied by the British.

=== Work as spy ===
Roe and Hawkins passed the messages from New York City to operative Caleb Brewster on Long Island. Brewster would take them across the Sound to Tallmadge at Fairfield, Connecticut. From there, Tallmadge forwarded the messages to Washington.

Roe served the Culper spy ring as a courier by secretly relaying its messages beginning in early 1779. He claimed to be conducting business as a merchant in order to avoid suspicion and pass through the British checkpoints. Roe became the sole dispatch carrier for the ring after July 1779, when Tallmadge gave Roe–but not Hawkins–a code number in his code index. Hawkins increasing paranoia had led him to abandon the mission at that time.

=== In historical records ===
Because Roe traveled over 1000 miles on horseback performing his missions during the war, he has been called the "Paul Revere of Long Island." In 2015, a letter written by loyalist soldier Nehemiah Marks to Adjutant General Oliver De Lancey, head of British Army Intelligence following Major John Andre’s capture and execution, was uncovered. The document contained information that brothers Nathaniel and Philip Roe were part of the "Long Island spy network," but the allegations were neither investigated nor acted upon.

== Later life ==
After the war, Roe continued to live in Setauket. He became a captain in Lieutenant Colonel David Pierson's New York militia regiment in Suffolk County, New York, in 1787. He and his family settled the area which would become the town of Patchogue on Long Island's south shore in 1798. Specifically, he settled on the area known as Pine Neck within East Patchogue and operated a farm there.

Roe died in Suffolk County in 1830 at the age of 82; and was buried in the family graveyard. His body was eventually re-interred in the Cedar Grove Cemetery, in Patchogue, after the town was founded by a descendant.
