= Nathaniel Sackett =

American spy (1737–1805)

- Born: April 10, 1737; Orange County, Province of New York, British America
- Died: July 28, 1805 (aged 68); Sullivan County, New York, United States
- Occupation: Spymaster
- Espionage activity
- Allegiance: United States
- Operations: Spymaster

Nathaniel Sackett (April 10, 1737 – July 28, 1805) was the spymaster appointed by General George Washington to create a network of civilian spies located in New York during the American Revolution. Sackett and his new spy ring would report to William Duer, a Continental Congressman, and General Washington. Sackett's later lack of progress led him to be relieved of his post. He was replaced with Benjamin Tallmadge, who built upon Sackett's work and established the Culper Spy Ring.

== Early life ==
Nathaniel Sackett was born in Orange County, New York, on April 10, 1737, to Rev. Samuel Sackett and Hannah Hazard. From an early age, Nathaniel Sackett had shown an interest in trading. He would later go on to work as a merchant before the American Revolution, settling in an area around Fishkill, New York, known as Mattewan. Nathaniel had worked with his uncle Nathaniel Hazard, a merchant based out of New York, starting when he was around 12 years old. When Sackett was 17 years old he traveled to New York to work as an apprentice in his uncle's shop. Upon completion of his apprenticeship, Sackett set up the first general store in Fishkill, New York. Nathaniel Sackett married Mary Rogers on January 3, 1759. Together they had five children: Annias Rogers Sackett, Samuel Sackett, Nathaniel Sackett, Hannah Sackett, and Elizabeth Sackett.

== Role in the American Revolution ==
After the Battles of Lexington and Concord in 1775, Nathaniel Sackett helped form what was known as the Rombout Precinct Committee of Safety in his home county of Duchess, New York. Sackett later served on the New York Committee for Detecting and Defeating Conspiracies. This Committee led him to work with William Duer, a Continental Congressman who was helping George Washington set up a network of civilian spies in New York. Duer later recommended Sackett to George Washington as the man to set up the new network. Duer and Washington believed that Sackett's ability to organize and his status as a civilian made him the perfect candidate to set up a spy network consisting of agents who were not enlisted in the military. Washington sent a letter to Sackett in February 1777 requesting that he enlist other civilians to monitor the activities of the British in New York. Washington granted Sackett an allowance of $50 per month to recruit others to the cause.

The operations of the spy network consisted of movements of soldiers across the Long Island and New York City area. However, their progress was insubstantial. Nathaniel Sackett failed to make any considerable progress with the spies in New York. Despite Sackett's ability to organize, he and his agents failed several times and failed to satisfy Washington's demands of the fledgling spy ring. Sackett was relieved of his position and replaced by Benjamin Tallmadge. Building upon Sackett's work, Tallmadge later created the Culper Spy Ring.

== After the Revolutionary War ==
After the war Sackett sought a position in the new federal government from George Washington. Washington declined to acquiesce to his request. Sackett served one term in the state legislature and retired. He eventually returned home to his shop and farm and later died in Sullivan County, New York, on July 28, 1805.

== In popular culture ==
Nathaniel Sackett, the Culper Spy Ring, and their activities during the Revolutionary War were made famous by the airing of the AMC historical drama Turn: Washington's Spies. The four season show depicts the actions of the spy network but has been questioned for its historical accuracy. The show fails to convey complete accuracy, especially by displaying Nathaniel Sackett's death, which in real life did not occur until after the Revolutionary War, in 1805. Sackett was portrayed by Stephen Root in the series.
