= Morton Pennypacker =

American historian and author

Frank Knox Morton Pennypacker (1872–1956) was a collector of Long Island, New York historical material and author of several books on Long Island history, including George Washington's Spies, the story of the Culper Ring.

Born in Pennsylvania, Pennypacker moved to New York City a little after the turn of the 20th century before moving to Southampton, New York on Long Island.

A writer and publicist by trade, he made a private hobby of collecting historical materials related to Long Island which eventually amounted to what is today called the Long Island Collection (formerly known as the Morton Pennypacker Long Island Collection), which contains some 20,000 odd books, papers, manuscripts, pictures, and other documents pertaining to the history of Long Island.

He discovered that "Samuel Culper, Junior," the head spy of the Culper Ring, was Robert Townsend, a member of the renowned New York Townsend family. Pennypacker did so by identifying an exact match in penmanship between the Culper letters attributed to Culper Junior and letters written by Robert Townsend. Pennypacker's findings were confirmed by forensic handwriting expert, Albert S. Osborn.

He married Ettie Hedges (1879-1970), a librarian from East Hampton, in 1936. They had no children.

Pennypacker's Collection is housed in the East Hampton Library. Pennypacker died at the age of 84 in Southampton Hospital.
