= Elizabeth Burgin =

American patriot during the American Revolutionary War

- Born: before 1760
- Died: after January 1801
- Other names: Elizabeth Bergin
- Known for: Helping more than 200 prisoners of war escape British prison ships

Elizabeth Burgin (before 1760 – January 1801 or after) was an American patriot during the American Revolutionary War who helped over 200 prisoners of war escape British prison ships. She worked with George Higday of the Culper Spy Ring, and after he was caught by the British, Major General James Pattison ordered her capture. Burgin went into hiding and did not see her children for weeks. She lost her home and possessions and struggled until she was awarded an annuity with George Washington's assistance. In a letter to the Continental Congress, he stated those who attest to her service include "many of our own officers who have returned from captivity" due to her missions.

== Background ==
When the British and the American forces fought during the American Revolutionary War, each side took prisoners and housed them in inhumane circumstances on ships, in jails, or wherever they could house them. Men starved due to lack of food, suffered from disease due to unsanitary conditions, and did not improve without medical care. The soldiers were held captive so that they were not able to fight again. Prisoners were not given any supplies, like clothing, blankets, and medicine. There was no recordkeeping of who was held captive on the ships.

During the Revolutionary War, more American soldiers died as prisoners of war than perished on the battlefield. British prisons were notorious for their terrible conditions, and none were worse than the prison ships of New York City.

— Louise Chipley Slavicek

There were an estimated 10,000 patriot prisoners of war in New York City. (Note: On November 21, 1780, Franklin and his wife were banished from the city for their efforts to help colonial prisoners.) Of those, 7,000 died in captivity.

== Life ==
Not much is known of Elizabeth Burgin's early life. She was a mother of three and probably a war widow who lived in New York. John Franklin, a wine merchant, and his wife, Deborah, were Burgin's neighbors. They lived near the "New Slip" in the shipyards (New York Harbor).

== Prisoners of war ==
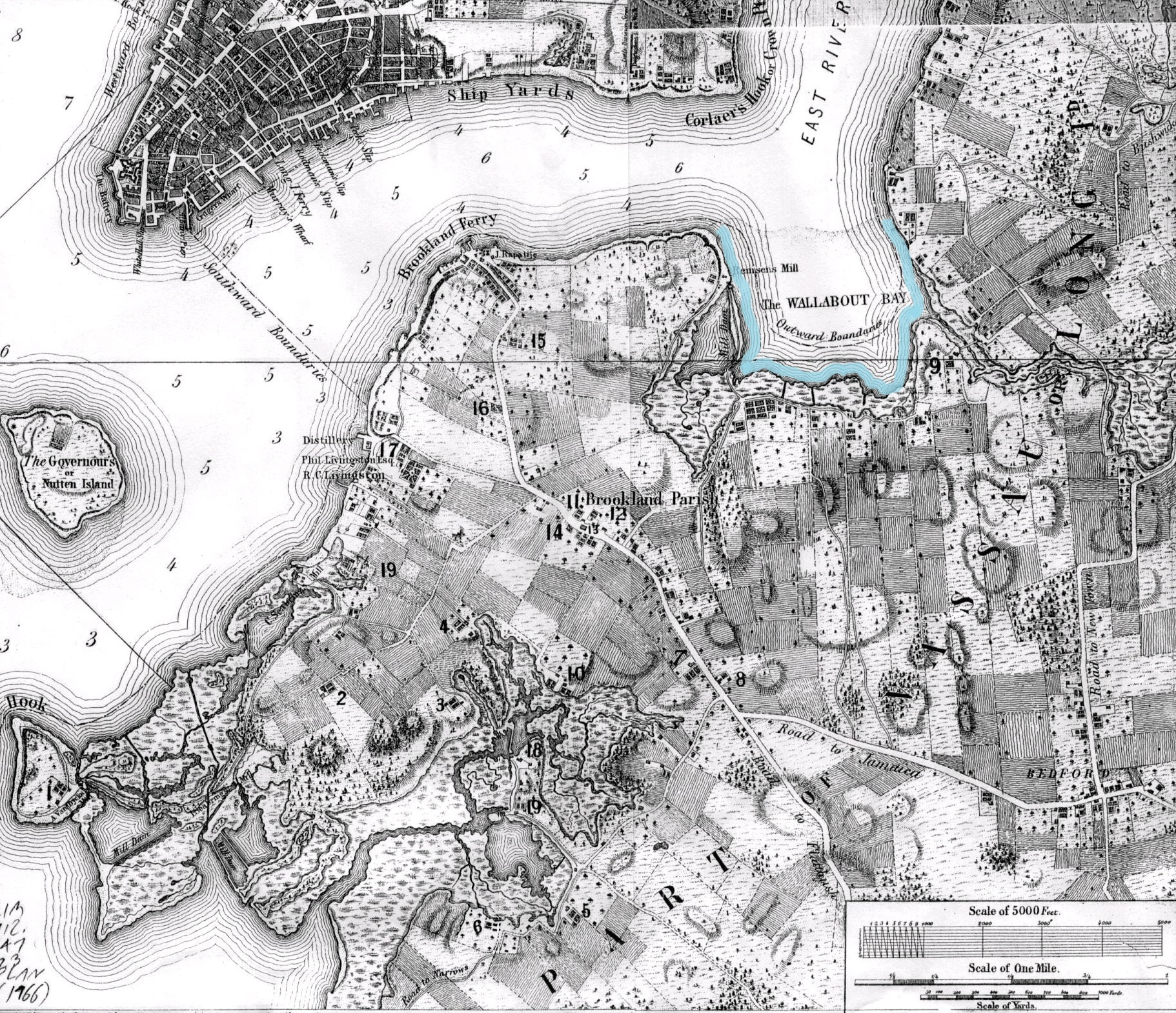
Map of Brooklyn, New York, made in 1766, with Wallabout Bay outlines

Burgin and Franklin helped prisoners held by the British Army. Only women were allowed to visit the prison ships, anchored at Wallabout Bay. (Note: Wallabout Bay is now the site of Brooklyn Navy Yard, between the present Williamsburg and Manhattan Bridges.) Burgin rowed a boat to the ships to deliver clothing, medicine, blankets, and food to the prisoners.

In 1779, she was approached by George Higday, a member of the Culper Spy Ring, to help prisoners of war escape the prison ships. The Culper Spy Ring was organized by Benjamin Tallmadge. Higday, who had connections within the British Army, and Burgin helped three officers escape imprisonment on Long Island. (Note: Wallabout Bay is in Brooklyn, which is the westernmost part of Long Island.) Burgin, a covert risk-taker, may have been an agent with the ring, with the code Agent 355.

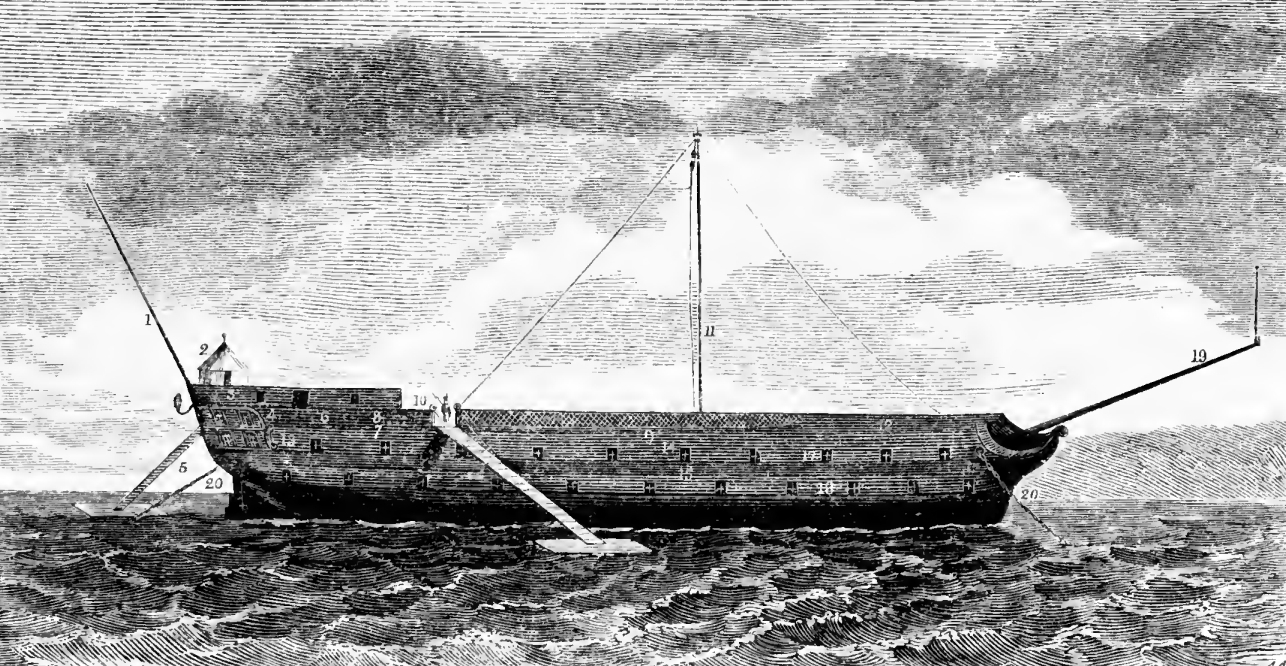
Recollections of the Jersey prison ship: from the original manuscripts of Capt. Thomas Dring, one of the prisoners. Captioned: "The Jersey Prison Ship as moored at the Wallabout near Long Island, in the year 1782."

They were able to remove more than 200 prisoners of war off the ships in weeks because the men were not missed. There was no record of who or how many people were held captive.

The British intercepted a letter sent from George Washington to Benjamin Tallmadge, which talked about Higday's espionage. On July 13, 1779, Higday's home on the North River (Hudson River) was raided by the British and arrested him. (Note: The letter was not written in invisible ink and Higday was mentioned by name. Tallmadge's horse was stolen on July 2.) Higday's wife, in order to help her husband, told the British that Burgin helped 200 prisoners escape. Upon checking in with the prison ships, it was determined that there were large numbers of missing soldiers.

As a result, Major General James Pattison, the British commander of New York, sent for Burgin on July 17, 1779, ordered guards to watch her house for five days, and placed a bounty of £200 (£24,820 or $34000 in 2016). It would take a British soldier 20 years to earn £200. If she was captured, she could have been hanged. In a letter to James Caldwell written on November 19, 1777 from Elizabethtown (now Elizabeth, New Jersey), Burgin admitted her guilt and her need to hide.

== Philadelphia ==
Burgin hid for two weeks before moving to Long Island, where she may have been introduced to spies in the Culper Ring. After hiding for another five weeks, she moved to Connecticut and finally Philadelphia.

In October 1779, Burgin received a flag of truce from the Board of War in order for her to get her children from New York back to Philadelphia. She went to Elizabethtown by November where she was told to make arrangements to collect her children from New York, which she was able to do under a flag of truce within a month of her arrival in Elizabethtown. However, she was not allowed to take her clothes or furniture. Since she was left with essentially nothing, Burgin petitioned to Washington in November 1779 for assistance. While she was in Elizabethtown, she learned that Colonel Silvanus Seely had traded illegally "with the enemy". The issue was brought before the Pennsylvania Supreme Executive Council on December 23, 1779, and the next day Joseph Reed corresponded with New Jersey governor William Livingston about the matter. Livingston responded on December 28 that due to his preliminary discussion with Seely, he finds an investigation is warranted.

Thomas Franklin, Jr., (Note: Thomas Franklin Jr. (1734-), a Quaker merchant, was the son of Thomas Franklin and the brother of Walter, Samuel, James, John, and two sisters. He married Mary Rhoads (1738-1779), the daughter of Samuel Rhoads, the mayor of Philadelphia.) an agent for patriot prisoners, offered her a place to live in late 1779. She and her three "small children" were then allowed to live in part of the house where the Board of War was located. She asked for employment to support her family.

On December 25, 1779, George Washington sent a letter to the Continental Congress that allowed her to receive rations. Washington said of her,

Regarding Elizabeth Burgin, recently an inhabitant of New York, from the testimony of our own Officers who have returned from captivity, it would appear that she has been indefatigable for the relief of the prisoners, and for facilitating their escape. For this conduct she incurred the suspicion of the British, and was forced to make her escape under disturbing circumstances.

The request was delayed because "this Post does not comprehend persons of this description"; Burgin was not a war widow and she was not a soldier. She received an annuity starting from 1781 and claimed the funds at least through 1787. After that, she was paid by the Register of the Treasury, who held that office at that time and was her assignee. The last payment was made in January 1801.

== Popular culture ==
- Her story is one of many told in the three-part special American Revolution (2014).
- A play about Burgin, A History of Launching Ships, by Avi Glickstein, is performed at the Brooklyn Navy Yards. It is the site where the prison ships she visited were anchored in New York Harbor during the Revolutionary War.

== Bibliography ==
- Casey, Susan (Susan Mary) (2015). "Elizabeth Burgin". Women heroes of the American Revolution : 20 stories of espionage, sabotage, defiance, and rescue. Chicago: Chicago Review Press. ISBN 978-1-61374-583-0.
- Frank, Lisa (2013). An Encyclopedia of American Women at War. ABC-CLIO. ISBN 9781598844443.
- Kilmeade, Brian (2013). George Washington's secret six : the spy ring that saved the American Revolution. New York : Sentinel. ISBN 978-1-59523-103-1.
- Watson, Robert (2017). The Ghost Ship of Brooklyn: An Untold Story of the American Revolution. Da Capo Press. ISBN 9780306825538.
