= Mersereau Ring =

The Mersereau Ring, a spy ring operating throughout the New Brunswick, NJ and New York regions during the American Revolution, began gathering intelligence on British military activity for General George Washington as early as December 1776. While retreating through New Brunswick, Washington set up the Mersereau Ring through businessman and patriot Joshua Mersereau. According to their initial arrangements, Joshua's eldest son John LaGrange Mersereau was to remain in New Brunswick after American forces retreated. By 1777, the Mersereau Ring expanded into a greater intelligence network operating under Colonel Elias Dayton of the 1st New Jersey Militia.

== Joshua Mersereau ==
Joshua Mersereau attended Kings College, practiced law in New York City, and operated a stage coach line with his brother John prior to the Revolutionary War. As the revolution approached, the brothers offered their horses for American military service and in 1775 Joshua helped rally troops for a military expedition into Quebec. During the Revolutionary War, Joshua served as a Representative for Richmond County with the Provincial Assembly of New York State.

In addition to his political responsibilities, Joshua served as Deputy Commissary of prisoners under General Elias Boudinot for Massachusetts, New Hampshire, and Rhode Island. In this role, Joshua corresponded frequently with George Washington about prisoners of war and intelligence matters. Joshua and the Mersereau family, owning a tavern on Staten Island and a stagecoach line between New York and Philadelphia, had the covert means for transporting intelligence reports through their legitimate businesses.

In 1780, Joshua Mersereau received a promotion to the rank of Major. Joshua continued to serve in his role as Deputy Commissary until the conclusion of the war, upon which he moved his family to Tioga County and became a surrogate judge.

== John LaGrange Mersereau ==
Once American forces retreated across the Delaware River in 1776, John LaGrange (1760-1841) moved from New Brunswick to Staten Island and later Manhattan where he gathered intelligence from behind British lines. Due to weakness in his right arm, John LaGrange was unable to carry a musket so he assumed this intelligence role to aid the American forces.

Joshua's apprentice, John Parker, served as the first courier between John LaGrange and the American forces and completed at least three trips across enemy lines. Parker was eventually caught by the British and died shortly thereafter in prison, prompting John LaGrange to assume responsibilities as both agent and courier. When serving as courier himself, John LaGrange used a large stone at Shooter's Island as a dead drop between New Jersey and Staten Island to pick up instructions and drop off intelligence reports. As precaution, John LaGrange would tow the reports in a bottle tied to his raft, thus allowing him to dispose of the incriminating evidence in the event British forces intercepted his raft. Light signals along the river served as indicators for when reports were ready for pick-up on Shooter’s Island. After 18 months of espionage behind British lines, the British finally began to suspect John LaGrange, prompting the agent to rejoin American forces in Rutland, Massachusetts. Once back with American forces, John LaGrange served as a Deputy Commissary of imprisoned British troops for the remainder of the conflict, caring for troops from General John Burgoyne's army. In order to maintain the flow of information coming from this network after John LaGrange's role was compromised, the Mersereau Ring received assistance from additional Mersereau family members. John LaGrange's brother Joshua used a skiff to go to Staten Island where he would pick up copies of the Register that Paul Mersereau would leave in the cellar of his house.

After the war, John LaGrange became a county clerk for Richmond County in Staten Island. John LaGrange was later appointed surrogate judge for Tioga County in 1791 and for Chenango County in 1798.

== John Mersereau ==
The elder John Mersereau (1731-1820), brother of Joshua and uncle of John LaGrange, oversaw a smaller network within the ring with at least six intelligence agents. These agents typically identified themselves in reports by their initials and consequently most of their identities are unknown yet suspected. The only known agent from this network is Paul Latourette, while the identities of "Amicus Reipublicae" and "A Stranger" remain unknown. The suspected identities of other agents include the same Culper Ring informant John Cork under the alias "J.C.", John Meeker or one of the Mersereaus under the alias "J.M.", and Asher Fitz Randolph under the alias "A.R." For his role in the Revolutionary War, the British had proclaimed the elder John a "Rebel" and offered five hundred guineas to anyone who could turn him in dead or alive.

== Accomplishments ==
The earliest intelligence success for the Mersereau Ring occurred in December 1776 when Joshua and John LaGrange discovered evidence that the British prepared to pursue the retreating Continental Army across the Delaware River. The British intentionally sunk boats with the purpose of floating them to transport troops across the Delaware; however, the Mersereaus discovered the boats and removed them, allowing the Continental Army to escape without pursuit.
