= John Clark (spy) =

American Revolution spy

John Clark, Jr.
- Born: ca. 1751
- Died: December 27, 1819
- Military career
- Allegiance: United States
- Branch: Continental Army
- Rank: Major
- Units: 1st Continental Infantry; 2nd Pennsylvania Battalion (Flying Camp)
- Conflicts: American Revolutionary War
- Other work: Auditor of Army expenses under Henry Laurens

Maj. John Clark, Jr. (ca. 1751-1819) was an American spy for George Washington. He was primarily responsible for operating the intelligence network in and around Philadelphia during the British occupation of that city during the American Revolutionary War.

== Early career ==
Clark was commissioned as a first lieutenant in the 1st Continental Infantry (Pennsylvania Rifles) on January 1, 1776, and was made a major of the 2nd Pennsylvania Battalion of the Flying Camp on September 14, 1776. He originally came to the attention of George Washington during the evacuation of Long Island and Manhattan. Directed to travel across Long Island Sound, he then scouted troop movements on Long Island.

== Revolutionary War ==
Clark was responsible for operating one of the most notable spy rings organized and run by the Continental Army during the war, one which prevented the destruction of Washington's army at least three different times.

His most important assignment occurred during the period of September to December 1777, when despite a serious injury to his shoulder suffered at Brandywine, he was tasked by Washington with obtaining information about General Howe's activities in Philadelphia. Clark set up a group of informants and couriers, and sent 30 detailed reports to Washington which allowed the Continental Army to react to British movements. When Clark set up a hoax in which he employed a false name while pretending to be a Quaker Loyalist who would inform on the Americans to General Howe, Howe was fooled, and offered Clark inducements to support the British cause. When Washington learned of this hoax, he prepared a false report of the Continental Army's strengths and planned movements, and ordered it to be delivered to Howe.

In December, with his wound still not healed, and after having not seen his wife in more than a year, Clark asked Washington for permission to travel home. Washington agreed, and introduced Clark to Henry Laurens, who gave Clark a desk job as auditor of Army expenses. Clark resigned in November 1779 to preserve his health. Clark lived quietly as a lawyer in York, Pennsylvania, where he was described as "of large frame, fine personal appearance, and brave to a fault, a man of fine mind, was a good lawyer, wrote a beautiful hand, and was very sarcastic in speech, when he thought it necessary so to be."

Clark died on December 27, 1819, aged 68.

== See also ==
- Intelligence in the American Revolutionary War
- Intelligence operations in the American Revolutionary War
