= Anna Strong (spy) =

American spy during the American Revolution

Anna Nancy Smith Strong
- Born: Anna Nancy Smith; April 14, 1740
- Died: August 12, 1812 (aged 72); Setauket, New York, US
- Burial place: East Setauket, Suffolk County, New York, United States
- Other name: Anne
- Occupations: spy, homemaker
- Spouse: Selah Brewster Strong III
- Children: 9
- Espionage activity
- Allegiance: United States
- Agency: Culper Ring
- Service years: 1776-1783
- Codename: 355
- Operations: American Revolutionary War

Anna Smith Strong (April 14, 1740 – August 12, 1812) of Setauket, New York was an American Patriot. Anna was one of the few female members of the Culper Spy Ring during the American Revolution. Her perceived main contribution in the ring was to relay signals to a courier who ran smuggling and military missions for General George Washington. No information has been found concerning Anna's activities after the war other than that she and her husband, Selah Strong, lived quietly in Setauket for the rest of their lives. She died on August 12, 1812.

== Family ==
Anna married Selah Brewster Strong III, who was a delegate to the first three provincial congresses in colonial New York. He also was a captain in the New York militia in 1776. He was imprisoned in the sugar house at New York City as a presumed spy, according to Rivington's Gazette of January 3, 1778. Family knowledge has him later imprisoned on the prison ship HMS Jersey (1736). Other works only mention his imprisonment on the prison ship, and previously mentioned family knowledge claims that Anna brought him food. Author Ryan Ann Hunter states that Anna eventually got Selah paroled through the influence of Tory relatives. Upon his release, he spent the rest of the war in Connecticut with the family's younger children while Anna stayed on Long Island. In 2022, historian Mark Sternberg corrected several misconceptions by reviewing the original primary sources, showing that Selah was held in the Provost (not a sugarhouse or the H.M.S. Jersey), was held for less than six months, never fled to Connecticut and - as noted by Caleb Brewster's crewmate Robert Brush - actively helped Brewster and his crew avoid capture by the British when they were hidden on the Strong property on Mount Misery (modern-day Belle Terre and Port Jefferson's Harbor Hills).

The Strong's children were Keturah S. (married James W. Woodhull), Thomas Shepherd (married Hanna Brewster), Margaret, Benjamin, Mary (died young), William Smith, Joseph (died young), George Washington, and another Joseph. Thomas became a judge and fathered Selah B. Strong. Circa 1925, a Selah Strong was oblivious to Anna Smith Strong's involvement in the Culper Spy Ring.

Anna's father was Colonel William Smith, son of Henry Smith and grandson of Colonel William Smith, a justice of the supreme court established in New York in 1691. He was clerk of Suffolk County, New York and judge of the Common Pleas Court of the county for several years before the American Revolution. Anna's mother was Margaret Lloyd Smith, daughter of Henry Lloyd of Lloyd's Neck.

== Culper Ring ==
Continental Army Major Benjamin Tallmadge began working with Abraham Woodhull in the summer of 1778 at the height of the American Revolutionary War to create what became known as the Culper spy ring. According to tradition, Anna Strong's role in the ring was to relay signals to a courier who ran a whaleboat across Long Island Sound on smuggling and military missions. She did this by hanging a black petticoat on her clothesline at Strong Point in Setauket, which was easily visible from a boat in the Sound, and also by Woodhull from his nearby farm. She would add a number of handkerchiefs for one of six coves where the courier would bring his boat and Woodhull would meet him. Historian Richard Welch writes that the tradition of the clothesline signal is unverifiable, but it is known that the British suspected a woman at Setauket who fit Anna's profile. Conversely, authors Brian Kilmeade and Don Yaeger suggest that she was an unlikely candidate to be the woman member of the Culper Ring. They claim that British law provided for lands to be confiscated if left abandoned, and they speculate that this forced Anna to remain on Long Island when her husband left for Connecticut. They further state that she had her children with her and her arrest would have left them parentless.

Selah Strong was on Washington's list to be reimbursed for expenses incurred in connection with activities for the Culper Ring.

== Agent 355 ==
Abraham Woodhull wrote a message to Benjamin Tallmadge to say that he would be visiting New York again and, "by the assistance of a [lady] of my acquaintance, shall be able to outwit them all." Several historians surmise that Anna Strong was the lady identified as "a 355" (Tallmadge's code for the word "lady"). She might have had her own reason to visit New York to see her husband aboard the prison ship where he was confined and to bring him food. If she was the one referred to, her main service on their trips would have been to divert attention from Woodhull. Again, Brian Kilmeade and Don Yaeger suggest that Anna Strong was an unlikely candidate to be the woman member of the Culper Ring. It is speculated by Kilmeade and Yaeger that a young woman connected to a prominent Loyalist family, who was staying in the city with her Tory relations, may also be referred to as "355". This young woman may have even had encounters with Major John André, and was able to retrieve information for the Culper Ring as well.

== In popular culture ==
AMC's Revolutionary War period drama TURN: Washington's Spies was based on Washington's Spies: The Story of America's First Spy Ring (2007) by Alexander Rose. Heather Lind plays Anna Strong in the series. In the show she is depicted as a woman with no children of her own. However, she at the time had five children. A previous relationship is hinted at between Strong and Woodhull, but Strong was married when she was twenty years old, and Woodhull was ten years old. As Agent 355, she is the namesake for FX's Y: The Last Man.

== See also ==
- Intelligence in the American Revolutionary War
- Intelligence operations in the American Revolutionary War
