= Robert Townsend (spy) =

18th-century American spy (1753-1838)

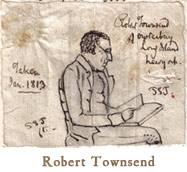
- Only surviving portrait of Robert Townsend
- Born: November 25, 1753; Oyster Bay, New York
- Died: March 7, 1838 (aged 84); Oyster Bay, New York
- Burial place: Townsend Cemetery
- Children: Robert Townsend, Jr.
- Espionage activity
- Allegiance: United States
- Service branch: Culper Ring
- Service years: 1779–1782
- Codename: Samuel Culper, Jr.; 723

Robert Townsend (November 26 , 1753 – March 7, 1838) was a member of the Culper Ring during the American Revolution. He operated in New York City with the aliases "Samuel Culper, Jr." and "723" and gathered information as a service to General George Washington. He is one of the least-known operatives in the spy ring and once demanded that Abraham Woodhull ("Samuel Culper") never tell his name to anyone, even Washington.

== Robert Townsend's early years ==
Townsend was the third son of ten children of Samuel and Sarah Townsend from Oyster Bay, New York. His father was a Whig-slanted politician who owned a store in Oyster Bay. Little is known about his early life. His mother was an Episcopalian and his father was a liberal Quaker. His father arranged an apprenticeship during his mid-teens with the merchant firm of Templeton and Stewart, where Robert lived and worked among soldiers and residents of Holy Ground, New York City's biggest red-light district during the war. Templeton and Stewart catered to the working-class residents of the district.

According to Alexander Rose, Townsend's early years were dedicated to making a fortune, not to demonstrating his patriotism. Rose suggests that Townsend fared well financially during the war by operating a store even as he was spying for Washington.

== Joins Culper Spy Ring ==
Several factors led Townsend to the Culper Spy Ring, including the influence of Thomas Paine’s Common Sense, the British harassment of his family, and his relationship with Woodhull. Even among those who were not members of the Quaker faith, its philosophies were widespread in much of the northeast at the time and colored the thought of many people; this included the sect's adherence to pacifism. However, Pennsylvania had experienced a break between "political" Quakers and "religious" Quakers during the 1750s. Essentially, the "religious Quakers" accused the "political Quakers" of breaking with traditional values, which resulted in political Quakers resigning from office and leading to a wave of "purification" within the movement. The remaining Quakers pledged to embrace nonviolence and never to rebel against a legal government, and the Quakers generally emerged as the strongest supporters of British rule.

Despite some historians' claims that Townsend was a Puritan, there is actually no evidence of this; in fact, his family were faithful members of the Oyster Bay Baptist Church, where the names of his father, mother, sister Sally, and several people enslaved by the family all appear on the membership roles. Nevertheless, Townsend seems to have been torn between his moderate upbringing and, as a result of Paine's pamphlet Common Sense. Paine had also been brought up in the Quaker tradition and advocated in Common Sense the early Quaker views of struggling against corruption and narcissism. Paine also advocated resistance as the means to achieve those goals, which put him directly at odds with the newly reformed Quaker movement. Paine argued that those espousing "pacifism at any price" were not authentic Quakers. His pamphlet inspired a small number of Quakers to join the struggle against Britain, as well as others who, like Townsend, were not Quaker but were also not political firebrands.

A few months after Paine's pamphlet was published, Townsend volunteered for a logistics post in the Continental Army, which would not require him to kill.

Another factor that led Townsend to join the fight against British rule was the treatment of his family by British soldiers in Oyster Bay. Several British officers thought that anti-British sentiment had been ingrained into the colonists' spirit and believed that "it should be thrash'd out of them [because] New England has poyson'd the whole." That led to numerous incidents of violence and pillage directed at colonists. Colonel John Graves Simcoe of the Queen's Rangers and roughly 300 of his men were stationed in Oyster Bay during the winter months. Simcoe took the Townsend home as his headquarters, and he and his men used the home whenever and however they wanted. Townsend's father, Samuel, was distraught about his prized apple orchard being torn down by Simcoe's men. Adding to the insult, the Townsends were forced to either swear allegiance to the King or go to prison.

A final factor was Townsend's relationship with Abraham Woodhull. They knew and trusted each other well enough by June 1779 that Townsend accepted when Woodhull asked him to join a new spy ring for Washington.

== Washington's intentions ==
Here are Washington's instructions for Woodhull (Culper, Sr.) and Townsend (Culper, Jr.):

Culper Junior, to remain in the City, to collect all the useful information he can-to do this he should mix as much as possible among the officers and refugees, visit the coffee houses, and all public places. He is to pay particular attention to the movements by land and water in and about the city especially. How their transports are secured against attempt to destroy them-whether by armed vessels upon the flanks, or by chains, booms, or any contrivances to keep off fire rafts.

The number of men destined for the defense of the City and environs, endeavoring to designate the particular corps, and where each is posted.

To be particular in describing the place where the works cross the island in the rear of the City-and how many redoubts are upon the line from the river to river, how many Cannon in each, and of what weight and whether the redoubts are closed or open next the city.

Whether there are any works upon the Island of New York between those near the City and the works at Fort Knyphausen or Washington, and if any, whereabouts and of what kind.

To be very particular to find out whether any works are thrown up on Harlem River, near Harlem Town, and whether Horn's Hook is fortified. If so, how many men are kept at each place, and what number and what sized cannon are in those works.

To enquire whether they have dug pits within and in front of the lines and works in general, three or four feet deep, in which sharp pointed stakes are pointed. These are intended to receive and wound men who attempt a surprise at night.

The state of the provisions, forage and fuel to be attended to, as also the health and spirits of the Army, Navy and City.

These are the principal matters to be observed within the Island and about the City of New York. Many more may occur to a person of C. Junr's penetration which he will note and communicate.

Culper Senior's station to be upon Long Island to receive and transmit the intelligence of Culper Junior...

There can be scarcely any need of recommending the greatest caution and secrecy in a business so critical and dangerous. The following seem to be the best general rules: To entrust none but the persons fixed upon to transmit the business. To deliver the dispatches to none upon our side but those who shall be pitched upon for the purpose of receiving them and to transmit them and any intelligence that may be obtained to no one but the Commander-in-Chief.

== "Culper, Jr." ==
Wasting little time to begin his spy activities, Townsend sent his first dispatch on June 29, 1779, nine days after Woodhull had informed Washington that he had a contact in New York. This first piece of intelligence was designed to look like a letter between two Loyalists. In it, Townsend stated that he received information from a Rhode Islander who gathered from British troops that two British divisions "are to make excursion into Connecticut... and very soon."

=== Counterfeiting plot discovery ===
One of Townsend's most valuable and memorable discoveries concerned a plot by the British to ruin the American economy by flooding the country with counterfeit dollars. American political and military leaders were well aware of these intentions and understood the potential ramifications of a worthless dollar. In early 1780, Townsend received some intelligence that the British believed that the war would not last much longer as a result of a disastrous depreciation of the dollar.

The most crucial part of Townsend's report was that the British had procured "several reams of paper made for the last emission struck by Congress." That was terrible news for American leaders since the British had been forced to counterfeit money on paper that was similar to the official paper, but now had the authentic paper. Thus, distinguishing between real and fake money would be virtually impossible. As a result, Congress was forced to recall all its bills in circulation, a major ordeal, but that saved the war effort by not allowing counterfeit money to flood the market.

=== Counterintelligence ===
Townsend warned his superiors of spies in their midst. At one point, he warned Benjamin Tallmadge that Christoper Duychenik was an agent of New York City Mayor David Mathews. Townsend warned that Mathews was under the direction of Governor William Tryon. Townsend also believed that if the men found out about the intelligence report, they would immediately suspect him, which indicated his potential association with high-level officials.

=== Disinformation ===
After the French had joined the war on the side of the colonists, a French fleet was set to land and disembark troops at Newport, Rhode Island. The problem with that plan was that the British controlled Long Island and New York City and wielded tremendous influence in Long Island Sound. The British got wind of the French plans and began to prepare for the interception of the smaller French fleet before the French soldiers could make landfall. Washington learned of the British plans through the Culper Spy Ring and thus managed to bluff the British forces into believing that an attack was planned on New York City by feeding the enemy false information on his plans. Thus, Washington kept the British occupied while the French safely landed their forces.

=== Suspicion ===
Several events caused Townsend to become extremely suspicious, which made him use great caution regarding spy activities.

One involved his nephew, James Townsend. After Washington and Woodhull had a brief falling out, James became the new courier between Robert and Tallmadge. James's cover story was that he was a Tory who was visiting family in Rebel-controlled territory and was seeking to recruit men for the British Army. When James visited the Deausenberry family, he acted the part well enough to convince the secret Patriots that he was really a Tory. John Deausenberry dragged James to the local Patriot headquarters, but after Washington's personal intervention, James was set free. That event not only caused anger toward his nephew for Robert, but also illustrated how easy it was to get caught. As a result of this event, Townsend often refused to report intelligence in writing for the remainder of his spying career.

Another event revolved around the arrest of Hercules Mulligan by Benedict Arnold, who was now serving the British after his defection from the Patriots. Mulligan eventually became an agent of the Culper Ring and was responsible for several intelligence reports. Mulligan had been arrested for agitating anti-British sentiment, and Arnold had him arrested for having questionable American contacts. Although he was released after no evidence showed him to be a spy, Mulligan's short captivity further convinced Townsend of the dangers that he faced. The event led Tallmadge to direct Culper Ring activities more towards tactical intelligence for Tallmadge's dragoons, rather than undercover operations in New York.

=== Final report ===
As the end of the war drew near, and American forces focused on Yorktown and Lord Charles Cornwallis, the Culper Ring became less significant for Washington. However, even after the British Parliament had overruled King George III by ordering a cessation of arms, Washington remained skeptical of British intentions. Reports suggested that British forces in New York had continued to fortify their lines. Nevertheless, Culper's activity was limited and ended for a short time. However, when a British delegate reached Paris in 1782 to discuss peace negotiations, Washington reactivated the Ring. Upon that request to reactivate, Townsend wrote what is likely his last report on September 19, 1782:

The last packet... has indeed brought the clearest and unequivocal Proofs that the independence of America is unconditionally to be acknowledged, nor will there be any conditions insisted on for those who have joined the King's Standard.... Sir Guy himself says that he thinks it not improbable that the next Packet may bring orders for an evacuation of N. York.

A fleet is getting ready to sail for the Bay of Fundy about the first of October to transport a large number of Refugees to that Quarter.... Indeed, I never saw such general distress and dissatisfaction in my life as is painted in the countenance of every Tory at N.Y.

== Later life ==
After the war, Townsend ended his business connections in New York and moved back to Oyster Bay. He never married and shared his family's home, and grew old with his sister Sally.

Townsend likely had a son, Robert Townsend, Jr., and it is unclear who the child's mother was. One possibility is Townsend's housekeeper, Mary Banvard, to whom Robert Sr. left $500 in his will. Another possibility is that the mother was a Culper Ring member, who is known only as Agent 355, but this is unlikely. Indeed, there is some question as to whether Robert, Jr., was Townsend's son at all. Solomon Townsend once claimed that Townsend's brother William was actually the father.

Townsend died on March 7, 1838, at 84 and took his "Culper" identity to the grave. The identity of Samuel Culper, Jr. was discovered only in 1930 by the New York historian Morton Pennypacker. The Townsend home in Oyster Bay is now the Raynham Hall Museum.

== In popular culture ==
- Robert Townsend is portrayed by actor Nick Westrate on the AMC period drama Turn: Washington's Spies.
- Robert Townsend appears in the USA Network television series White Collar in the episode "Identity Crisis".

== See also ==
- Intelligence in the American Revolutionary War
- Intelligence operations in the American Revolutionary War
