= Abraham Woodhull =

American Revolutionary War spy (1750-1826)

- Born: October 7, 1750; Setauket, Province of New York, British America
- Died: January 23, 1826 (aged 75); Setauket, New York, United States
- Occupation: Magistrate
- Spouses: Mary Smith (m. 1781; died 1806); Lydia Terry (m. 1824)
- Children: Jesse Smith Woodhull, Mary Woodhull, Elizabeth Woodhull
- Parent(s): Richard and Mary Woodhull (née Smith)
- Espionage activity
- Allegiance: United States
- Service branch: Continental Army
- Service years: Late 1778–1783
- Codename: "Samuel Culper" and then "Samuel Culper Sr."
- Operations: Culper Ring

Abraham Woodhull (October 7, 1750 – January 23, 1826) was a leading member of the Culper Spy Ring in New York City and Setauket, New York, during the American Revolutionary War. He used the alias "Samuel Culper" (later "Samuel Culper Sr."), which was a play on Culpeper County, Virginia, and was suggested by George Washington.

The Culper Ring was a successful operation that provided Washington with valuable information on the British Army headquartered in New York from October 1778 to the end of the war. After the United States gained independence, Woodhull served as a magistrate, as had his father before him, and served as a judge in Suffolk County, New York.

== Background ==
Woodhull was a descendant of Richard Lawrence Woodhull, a wealthy settler of Setauket, and was also related to New York militia Brigadier General Nathaniel Woodhull. His parents were Judge Richard Woodhull and Mary Woodhull (née Smith).

Woodhull served as a lieutenant in the Suffolk County, New York, militia in the fall of 1775 but resigned after a few months. He was motivated by the murder of his cousin Brigadier General Nathaniel Woodhull of the New York militia, who was wounded by sword and bayonet cuts after he had been captured on August 29, 1776. According to some reports, he had been deprived of medical care and food and suffered an agonizing death on September 20, 1776, and Abraham Woodhull was inflamed against the British by that event. He did not immediately take up arms or begin spying, however, and was more placid than some of his friends, who joined the Continental Army at the outset of the war.

He was the only surviving son of aging parents, and he stayed on the family farm to attend to his family and their property.

== Spy ring ==
Continental Army Major Benjamin Tallmadge was Woodhull's neighbor in Setauket and approached Woodhull in August 1778 about gathering intelligence for the Patriot cause during the American Revolutionary War. Woodhull had been caught smuggling contraband across Long Island Sound, and Tallmadge spoke with Connecticut Governor Jonathan Trumbull and got him released. Tallmadge then set up a spy network in New York, with Woodhull as the lead agent.

Woodhull began spying in October 1778 and sent his first "Samuel Culper" letter on October 29, 1778, after he had sworn an oath of loyalty to the Crown as cover. He planned to travel to Manhattan, ostensibly to visit his married sister, Mary Underhill, and her husband, Amos, at their boarding house. In Manhattan, he collected information from various sources, including British officers staying at the Underhill boarding house, and then returned to Setauket, where he passed the information to the Continental Army lieutenant and whaleboat operator Caleb Brewster to take across Long Island Sound to Tallmadge.

Tallmadge then sent the information to General George Washington. Austin Roe became the main courier for the ring after Woodhull stopped going to New York City to gather intelligence personally. He delivered messages via dead drop, burying them in a box in a pasture that he rented on Woodhull's property.

== Later life ==
Coat of Arms of Abraham Woodhull

Woodhull married his friend Mary Smith in 1781 and had three children with her. He held a few minor political appointments, including magistrate in Suffolk County, New York, from 1799 to 1810. Mary died in 1806, and he married Lydia Terry in 1824.

He died in Setauket on January 23, 1826, and is buried in the Setauket Presbyterian Church and Burial Ground.

== In popular culture ==
Warren Walker suggested in 1956 that James Fenimore Cooper's character Harvey Birch had been based upon the work of "Samuel Culper" as a spy. That would include both Woodhull as "Culper Sr." and Robert Townsend, who used the alias "Samuel Culper Jr."

Woodhull was portrayed from 2014 to 2017 by Jamie Bell in AMC's spy thriller and historical drama series Turn: Washington's Spies, which was based on Washington's Spies: The Story of America's First Spy Ring (2007) by Alexander Rose. Other people from Woodhull's life, such as his father and wife, are portrayed in the show as well.

== See also ==
- Intelligence operations in the American Revolutionary War
