= Knowlton =

Knowlton may refer to:

== People ==
- Knowlton (surname), any of several people with the surname
- Justice Knowlton (disambiguation)
- Knowlton Ames (1868-1931), US athlete in football
- Knowlton Nash (1927-2014), Canadian newsman
- E. Knowlton Fogg (1837-1900), US businessman

== Places ==
=== United Kingdom ===
- Knowlton Circles, a complex of henges and earthworks in Dorset
- Knowlton Court, a country estate in Kent
- Knowlton, Dorset, a former ecclesiastical and civil parish in Woodlands, Dorset
- Knowlton Hundred, an area in Dorset County
- Knowlton, Kent a parish in England
- Knowlton railway station, a stop on the East Kent Light Railway from 1916 until 1948

=== United States ===
==== Structures ====
- Knowlton Hall, a building complex on the Austin E. Knowlton School (Columbus, Ohio)
- Knowlton Hat Factory, an historic structure in Ashford, Connecticut
- Ebenezer Knowlton House, an historic structure in Montville, Maine
- Knowlton Mansion, an historic structure in Philadelphia, Pennsylvania
- Knowlton Memorial Hall, a museum in Ashford, Connecticut

==== Inhabited places ====
- Knowlton (CDP), Wisconsin, a census-designated area in Marathon County, Wisconsin
- Knowlton, Wisconsin, a town in Marathon County, Wisconsin
- Knowlton Township, New Jersey, a township in Warren County, New Jersey

=== Canada ===
- Knowlton, Quebec, a village in Brome Lake, in the Montérégie region of Quebec

== Other uses ==
- Hill & Knowlton, a New York City-based global public relations company
- Knowlton's Rangers, an early US military intelligence group
