= Knowlton (surname) =

Knowlton is a surname. Notable people with the surname include:

- Andrew Knowlton, American magazine editor and television personality
- Austin Eldon Knowlton (1909–2003), American architect
- Bill Knowlton (1898–1944), American baseball pitcher
- Charles Knowlton (1800–1850), American physician and writer
- Daniel Gibson Knowlton (1922–2015), American bookbinder
- David Clark Knowlton, American social anthropologist and contributor to Mormonism: A Historical Encyclopedia
- Ebenezer Knowlton (1815–1874), American politician and minister
- Edward U. Knowlton (1933–2016), American physician and politician
- Elizabeth Knowlton (1895–1989), American mountaineer and writer
- Frank Hall Knowlton (1860–1926), American paleobotanist
- Grace Knowlton (1932–2020), American sculptor
- James H. Knowlton (1813–1879), American politician
- Ken Knowlton, American computer graphics pioneer and artist
- Miles Justice Knowlton (1825–1874), American missionary
- Nancy Knowlton (1949–), American biologist
- Richard Knowlton, former CEO of the Hormel company
- Thomas Knowlton (1740–1776), American military officer
- William A. Knowlton (1920–2008), American army general
- Wiram Knowlton (1816–1863), American politician
