= Minnesota Historical Society =

State historical society of Minnesota

- 'M' of the Minnesota Historical Society's Logo
- Formation: 1849; 177 years ago
- Headquarters: Saint Paul, Minnesota, U.S.
- Website: www.mnhs.org

The Minnesota Historical Society (MNHS) is a nonprofit educational and cultural institution dedicated to preserving the history of the U.S. state of Minnesota. It was founded by the territorial legislature in 1849, almost a decade before statehood. The Society is named in the Minnesota Constitution. It is headquartered in the Minnesota History Center in downtown Saint Paul.

Although its focus is on Minnesota history, it is not constrained by it. Its work on the North American fur trade has been recognized in Canada as well.

MNHS holds a collection of nearly 550,000 books, 37,000 maps, 250,000 photographs, 225,000 historical artifacts, 950,000 archaeological items, 38,000 cubic feet (1,100 m^{3}) of manuscripts, 45,000 cubic feet (1,300 m^{3}) of government records, 5,500 paintings, prints and drawings; and 1,300 moving image items.

Since 2011, MNopedia: The Minnesota Encyclopedia, has been an online "resource for reliable information about significant people, places, events, and things in Minnesota history." The work is funded through a Legacy Amendment Arts and Cultural Heritage Fund grant and administered by the Minnesota Historical Society. The Minnesota Historical Society Press (MNHS Press) publishes books on the history and culture of Minnesota and the Upper Midwest with the goal of advancing research, supporting education, and sharing diverse perspectives on Minnesota history. MNHS Press is the oldest publishing company in the state of Minnesota and the largest historical society press in the nation, with more than 500 books in print. MNHS Press also produces the quarterly magazine, Minnesota History (journal).

== History ==
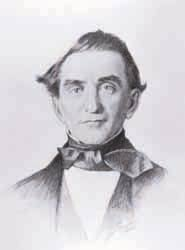
Sketch of Charles K. Smith, founder of the Minnesota Historical Society

The Minnesota Historical Society was established on October 20, 1849, as the fifth act of the Minnesota Territorial Legislature. The Society was established earlier than was common for historical societies in other states. As Territorial Governor, Alexander Ramsey recommended saving every newspaper published in the Minnesota Territory. Ramsey stated "the preservation by a community, of materials for the composition of its history, when a future time shall require it to be written, is a task not without its uses; and, when early commenced, easily accomplished." Charles K. Smith, the first Secretary of the Minnesota Territory, drew up the act and following the Society's charter, Smith and 18 other incorporators formally organized the Society on November 15, 1849.

Upon organization, the Society had no headquarters. The Society initially used the Territorial Secretary's office, hotel rooms, and store lofts. In 1855, the Society was granted a room in the Minnesota State Capitol. Enabled by an 1856 amendment to the Society's charter allowing the Society to own unlimited property, the Society began a capital campaign to fund the construction of its own building..

Daniel A. Robertson, former editor and proprietor of the Minnesota Democrat served as chairman of the building committee. Robertson raised $1,500 via the sale of sixty-two lifetime memberships to the Society in order to fund the acquisition of two lots to serve as the site of a building to house the society. On the expectation that fundraising would continue at a similar place, plans were made to begin a two-year building construction On June 24, 1856, the Society held a gala with invitations sent to scientific and literary guests from across the nation to celebrate the laying of the cornerstone of the building. The gala was reported in the Pioneer and Democrat as the "grandest gala day in the history of our city". Two weeks later, the building committee had exhausted their funds and passed a resolution to assess annual members five dollars in order to pay for the protection of the building foundation against winter frosts at the cost of $100. The society approved a search for an architect who could draft a structure that could be built for $15,000 or less. Following the protection of the foundation, work on the building ceased as the Panic of 1857 resulted in the impoverishment of many formerly wealthy Minnesotans.

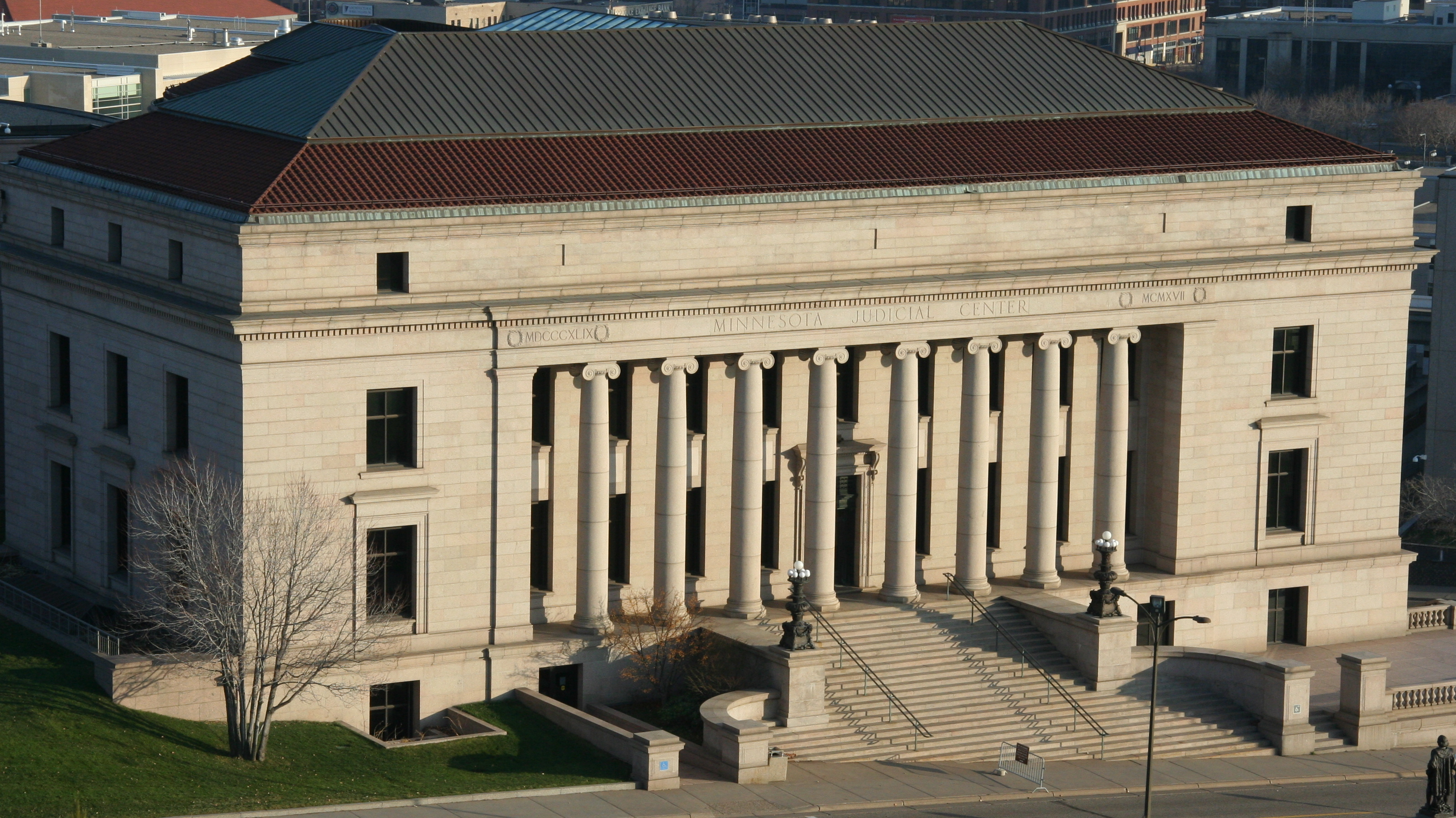
The former Historical Society building seen from the roof of the State Capitol

The Society would continue to operate out of the Capitol until the Minnesota State Legislature appropriated $500,000 for the construction of a fireproof historical building via an act passed in 1913 and amended in 1915. The building was completed in 1917 and the Society finished the process of moving its collections on March 1, 1918. The building currently serves as the Minnesota Judicial Center. The Society moved to its current location, the Minnesota History Center, in 1992.

In 2017, MNHS formed the Dakota Community Council and the Department of Native American Initiatives, both to better interpret Dakota history and work to provide indigenous-led programming.

== State historic sites ==
The Minnesota Historical Society operates 31 historic sites and museums, 26 of which are open to the public. MNHS manages 16 sites directly and 7 in partnerships where the society maintains the resources and provides funding. 6 sites are being held for preservation but are closed to public access, and five are self-guided sites with interpretive signage. Seven of the sites are National Historic Landmarks and 16 others are on the National Register of Historic Places (NRHP). Seven sites lie within Minnesota state parks, and three are elements of the Mississippi National River and Recreation Area.

| Site name | Image | Location | Era of features | Year added to MNHS | Management | Remarks |
|---|---|---|---|---|---|---|
| Alexander Ramsey House | | St. Paul | 1872–1964 | 1964 | Direct | Home of Minnesota governor and U.S. Congressman Alexander Ramsey with original furnishings. NRHP |
| Birch Coulee Battlefield | | Morton | September 2, 1862 | 1976 | Self-guided | Site of the Battle of Birch Coulee, the deadliest battle for U.S. troops in the Dakota War of 1862. NRHP. |
| Charles Lindbergh House and Museum | | Charles A. Lindbergh State Park | 1906–1920 | 1969 | Direct | House of U.S. Congressman Charles August Lindbergh and his son, aviator Charles Lindbergh. National Historic Landmark |
| Comstock House | | Moorhead | 1882 | 1964 | Partnership | Restored home of U.S. Congressman and businessman Solomon Comstock with its original furnishings. NRHP |
| Folsom House | | Taylors Falls | 1854–1968 | 1968 | Partnership | Restored home of businessman, politician, and historian W.H.C. Folsom with its original furnishings. NRHP contributing property |
| Forest History Center | | Grand Rapids | 1900–1934 | 1975 | Direct | Recreated logging camp and exhibits on humankind's relationship with Minnesota's forests. |
| Fort Renville | | Lac qui Parle State Park | 1822–1846 | 1973 | Preservation | Location of a fur trading post established by Joseph Renville. |
| Fort Ridgely | | Fort Ridgely State Park | 1853–1867 | 1969 | Self-guided | Fort built to keep the peace around a Dakota reservation, but attacked twice during the Dakota War of 1862. NRHP |
| Grand Mound | | International Falls | 200 BCE–1400 | 1970 | Preservation | Five burial mounds include the largest prehistoric structure remaining in the Upper Midwest, 25 feet (7.6 m) high and 100 feet (30 m) in diameter. National Historic Landmark |
| Harkin Store | | New Ulm | 1870–1901 | 1973 | Direct | General store first built in the 1870s with much of the original inventory still on display. NRHP |
| Historic Forestville | | Forestville Mystery Cave State Park | 1853–1899 | 1978 | Direct | The remains of the once-bustling 19th century town of Forestville, which became a ghost town after the railroad passed it by. NRHP |
| Historic Fort Snelling | | Fort Snelling State Park | 1820–1946 | 1969 | Direct | Portions of the fort have been restored to their original frontier appearance, while later additions served as barracks for soldiers training during World War II. A National Historic Landmark and part of the Mississippi National River and Recreation Area. |
| James J. Hill House | | St. Paul | 1891–1921 | 1978 | Direct | Mansion of railroad magnate James J. Hill. National Historic Landmark |
| Jeffers Petroglyphs | | Jeffers | 3000 BCE–1750 | 1966 | Direct | Exposed rocks bear ancient Native American petroglyphs. NRHP |
| Lac qui Parle Mission | | Montevideo | 1835–1854 | 1973 | Partnership | Reconstructed wooden church where missionaries worked to convert the Dakota. NRHP |
| Lower Sioux Agency | | Lower Sioux Indian Reservation | 1853– | 1967 | Partnership | Museum depicting the lives of Dakota people before and after the Dakota War of 1862. NRHP |
| Marine Mill | | Marine on St. Croix | 1839–1895 | 1972 | Self Guided | Ruins of Minnesota's first commercial sawmill. NRHP |
| Mill City Museum | | Minneapolis | 1874–1965 | 2002 | Direct | Museum of the flour milling industry that built Minneapolis, within the ruins of the Washburn "A" Mill, a National Historic Landmark. Part of the Mississippi National River and Recreation Area. |
| Mille Lacs Indian Museum | | Mille Lacs Indian Reservation | Prehistory–present | 1959 | Direct | Museum of the history and culture of the Mille Lacs Band of Ojibwe. |
| Minnehaha Depot | | Minneapolis | 1875–1963 | 1964 | Partnership | Former train station near Minnehaha Falls with "gingerbread" Victorian architecture. Operated by the Minnesota Transportation Museum. |
| Minnesota History Center | | St. Paul | Prehistory–present | | Direct | Minnesota Historical Society's headquarters, with permanent exhibits about Minnesota, changing exhibits about national history, and a library. |
| Minnesota State Capitol | | St. Paul | 1905–present | 1969 | Direct | Tours and exhibits of the state's seat of government. NRHP |
| Morrison Mounds | | Battle Lake | 690 BCE | 1968 | Preservation | Includes the oldest burial mound in Minnesota. NRHP |
| Oliver Kelley Farm | | Elk River | 1850–1901 | 1961 | Direct | Frontier farmstead of Oliver Hudson Kelley, one of the founders of the National Grange of the Order of Patrons of Husbandry. National Historic Landmark |
| Sibley Historic Site | | Mendota | 1838–1910 | 1996 | Partnership | Homes of Henry Hastings Sibley, Minnesota's first state governor, and fur trader Jean-Baptiste Faribault. NRHP and part of the Mississippi National River and Recreation Area. |
| Snake River Fur Post | | Pine City | 1804 | 1965 | Direct | Recreated North West Company trading post and Ojibwe encampment. NRHP |
| Split Rock Lighthouse | | Split Rock Lighthouse State Park | 1910–1969 | 1976 | Direct | Clifftop lighthouse on Lake Superior restored to its 1920s appearance. National Historic Landmark |
| Stumne Mounds | | Pine City | | 1968 | Preservation | Group of linear burial mounds near the Snake River. NRHP |
| Traverse des Sioux | | St. Peter | Prehistory–1869 | 1981 | Self Guided | Site of a river ford, the signing of the Treaty of Traverse des Sioux, and a former town. NRHP |
| Upper Sioux Agency | | Upper Sioux Agency State Park | 1854–1862 | 1969 | Preservation | Location of a federal agency established to convert Dakotas to a Euro-American farming lifestyle, but destroyed in the Dakota War of 1862. NRHP |
| W.W. Mayo House | | Le Sueur | 1859– | 1970 | Partnership | Home built by William Worrall Mayo, founder of the Mayo Clinic, and later home of Carson Nesbit Cosgrove, founder of the Green Giant food company. NRHP |

== Document depositories ==
- "Journals (Minnesota history v1-4; Collections, Biennial reports, Annals etc) and other documents of the Minnesota Historical Society". Minnesota Historical Society / Internet Archive.

These publications are described in more detail in an online format (without the downloadable document formats available above), at the MHC's own Digital History Books page.

== See also ==
- List of historical societies in Minnesota
