= Senator Folsom =

Senator Folsom may refer to:

- George Folsom (1802–1869), New York State Senate
- W.H.C. Folsom (1817–1900), Minnesota State Senate
