= Nathan Hale =

American Patriot and soldier (1755–1776)

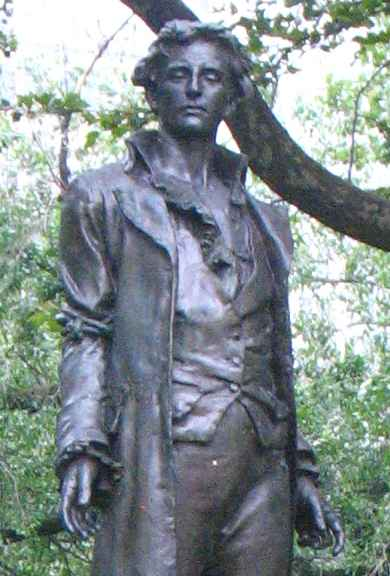
- Nathan Hale, by Frederick MacMonnies, City Hall Park, New York
- Born: June 6, 1755; Coventry, Connecticut Colony, British America
- Died: September 22, 1776 (aged 21); British-occupied New York City
- Cause of death: Execution by hanging
- Education: Yale College
- Occupations: Soldier; spy
- Parent(s): Richard Hale; Elizabeth Strong
- Espionage activity
- Allegiance: United States
- Service branch: Continental Army
- Agency: 7th Connecticut Regiment; Knowlton's Rangers
- Service years: 1775-1776
- Rank: Captain
- Operations: American Revolutionary War; New York campaign

Nathan Hale (June 6, 1755 – September 22, 1776) was an American Patriot, soldier, and spy for the Continental Army during the American Revolutionary War. He volunteered for an intelligence-gathering mission in New York City but was captured by the British and executed. Hale is considered an American hero and in 1985 was officially designated the state hero of Connecticut.

== Early life and family ==
Nathan Hale was born in Coventry, Connecticut, in 1755, to Deacon Richard Hale and Elizabeth Strong, a descendant of Elder John Strong. He was a great-grandson of the Reverend John Hale, an important figure in the Salem witch trials of 1692. He was also the grand-uncle of Edward Everett Hale, a Unitarian minister, writer, and activist noted for social causes including abolitionism. He was the uncle of journalist Nathan Hale, who founded the Boston Daily Advertiser and helped establish the North American Review.

In 1769, when Nathan Hale was fourteen years old, he was sent with his brother Enoch, who was sixteen, to Yale College. He was a classmate of fellow Patriot spy Benjamin Tallmadge. The Hale brothers belonged to the Linonian Society of Yale, which debated topics in astronomy, mathematics, literature, and the ethics of slavery. Nathan graduated with first-class honors in 1773 at age 18 and became a teacher, first in East Haddam and later in New London.

== American Revolutionary War ==
After the Revolutionary War began in 1775, Hale joined a Connecticut militia unit and was elected first lieutenant within five months. His company participated in the Siege of Boston, but Hale remained behind. It has been suggested that he was unsure as to whether he wanted to fight, or possibly that he was hindered because his teaching contract in New London, Connecticut did not expire until several months later, in July 1775. On July 4, 1775, Hale received a letter from his classmate and friend Benjamin Tallmadge, who had gone to Boston to see the siege for himself. He wrote to Hale, "Was I in your condition, I think the more extensive service would be my choice. Our holy Religion, the honor of our God, a glorious country, & a happy constitution is what we have to defend." Tallmadge's letter was so inspiring that, several days later, Hale accepted a commission as first lieutenant in the 7th Connecticut Regiment under Colonel Charles Webb of Stamford.

Hale was also a member of Knowlton's Rangers, the first organized intelligence service organization of the United States of America, led by Lieutenant Colonel Thomas Knowlton. In the spring of 1776, the Continental Army moved to Manhattan to defend New York City against the anticipated British attack. In August, the British soundly defeated the Continentals in the Battle of Long Island via a flanking move from Staten Island across Brooklyn. General George Washington was desperate to determine the location of the imminent British invasion of Manhattan. To that end, Washington called for a spy behind enemy lines, and Hale was the only volunteer.

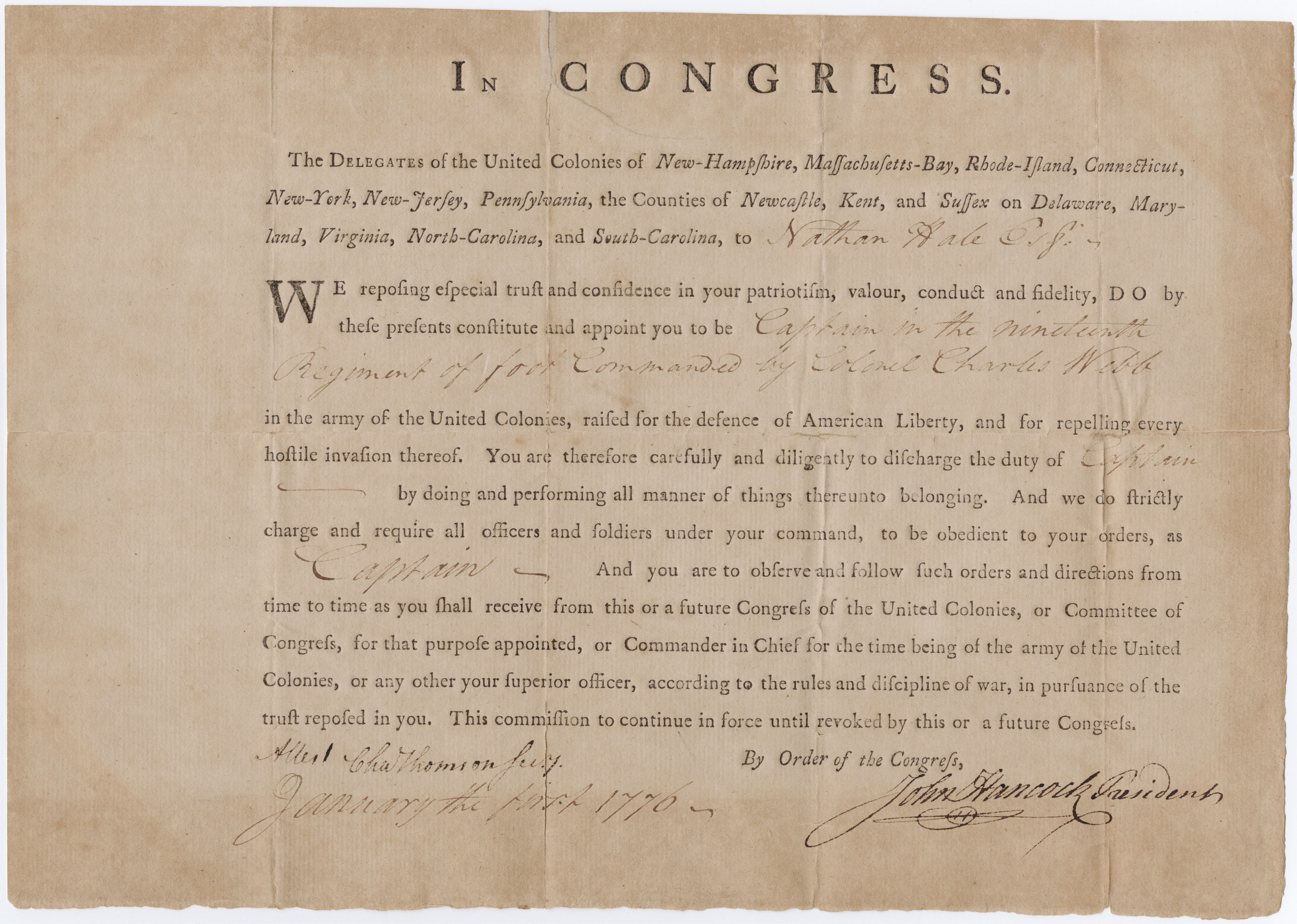
Commission of Nathan Hale, captain in the Nineteenth Regiment of foot, commanded by Colonel Charles Webb. Signed by John Hancock. January 1, 1776.

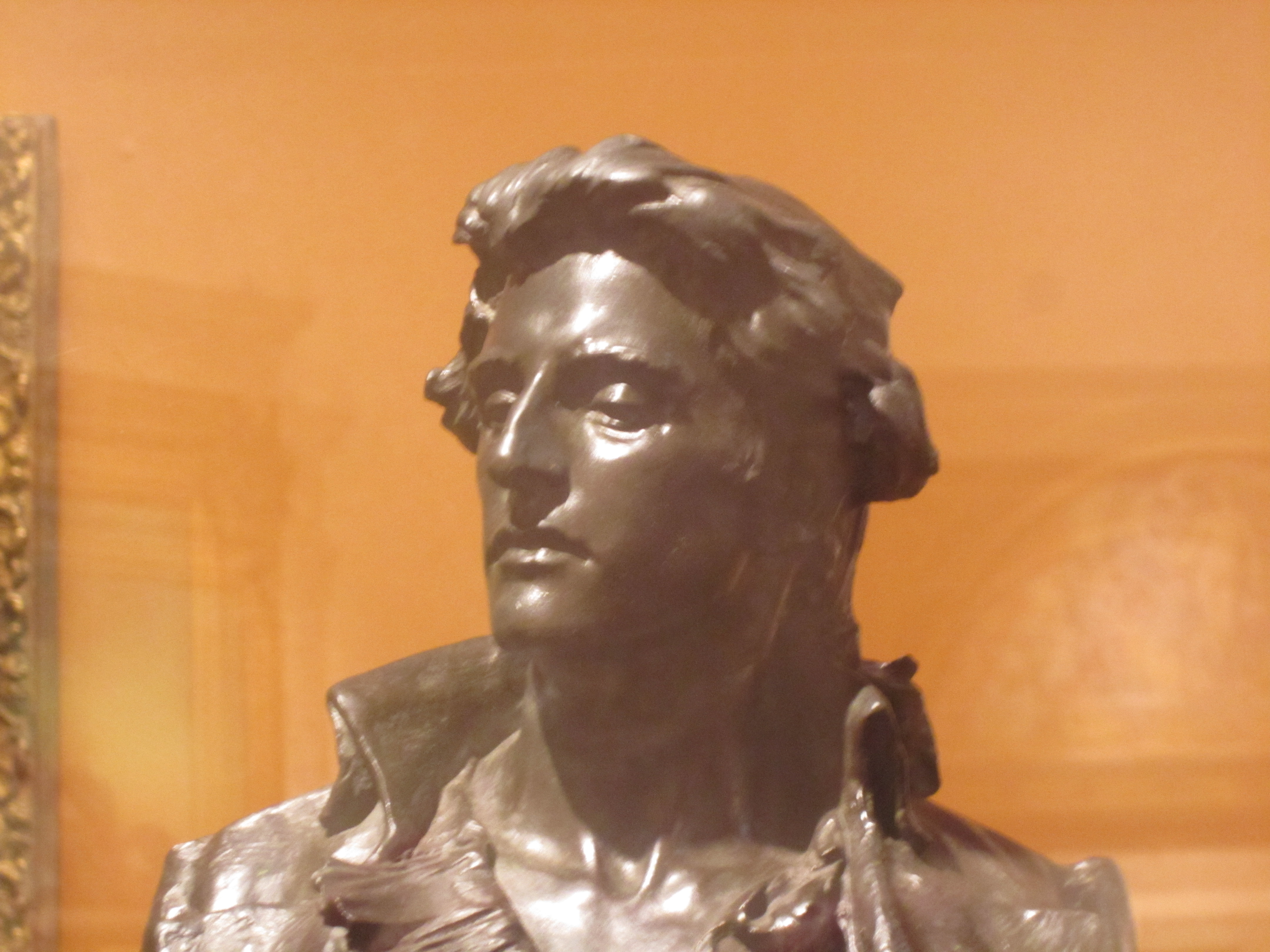
Nathan Hale as depicted in bronze (1890) by Frederick William MacMonnies at the Brooklyn Museum

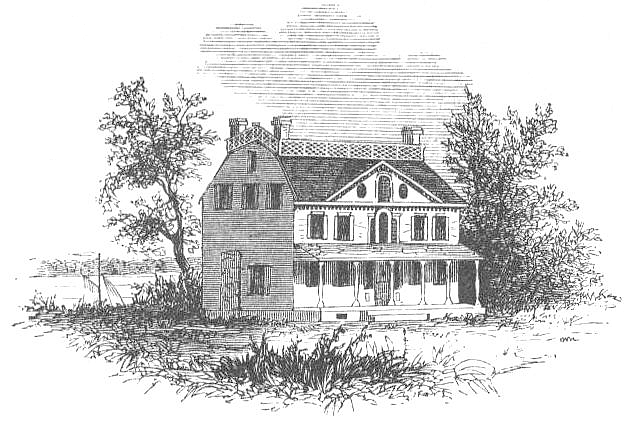
Beekman House, Manhattan

=== Intelligence-gathering mission ===
On September 8, 1776, Hale volunteered to go behind enemy lines and report on British troop movements, which he knew was an act of spying punishable by death. On September 12, he was ferried across Long Island Sound to Huntington, New York, on British-controlled Long Island. Hale planned to disguise himself as a Dutch schoolteacher looking for work, although he did not travel under an assumed name and reportedly carried with him his Yale diploma bearing his name.

While Hale was undercover, New York City—then an area at the southern tip of Manhattan, mostly south of what is now Chambers Street—fell to British forces on September 15, so Washington was forced to retreat to the north in Harlem Heights (now Morningside Heights). On September 21, a quarter of the lower portion of Manhattan burned in the Great New York Fire of 1776. The fire was later widely thought to have been started by American saboteurs in order to keep the city from falling into British hands, and though setting fire to New York during Washington's retreat had indeed been proposed, Washington and Congress had rejected the idea and denied responsibility. The Americans accused British soldiers of starting the fires without orders from their superiors so they could sack the city.

An account of Hale's capture, later obtained by the Library of Congress, was written by Consider Tiffany, a Connecticut shopkeeper and Loyalist. In Tiffany's account, Major Robert Rogers of the Queen's Rangers saw Hale in a tavern and recognized him. After luring Hale into betraying his allegiance by pretending to be a Patriot himself, Rogers and his Rangers apprehended Hale near Flushing Bay in Queens, New York. Another story is that Hale's cousin, a Loyalist named Samuel Hale, was the one who revealed his true identity.

British General William Howe had established his headquarters in the Beekman House in a then-rural part of Manhattan, on a rise between what are now 50th and 51st Streets between First and Second Avenues, near where Beekman Place commemorates the connection. Hale reportedly was questioned by Howe, and physical evidence was found on him. Rogers provided information about the case. According to some accounts, Hale spent the night in a greenhouse at the mansion, while others say he spent it in a bedroom there. He requested a Bible; his request was denied. Sometime later, he requested a clergyman. Again, the request was denied.

=== Death and purported last words ===
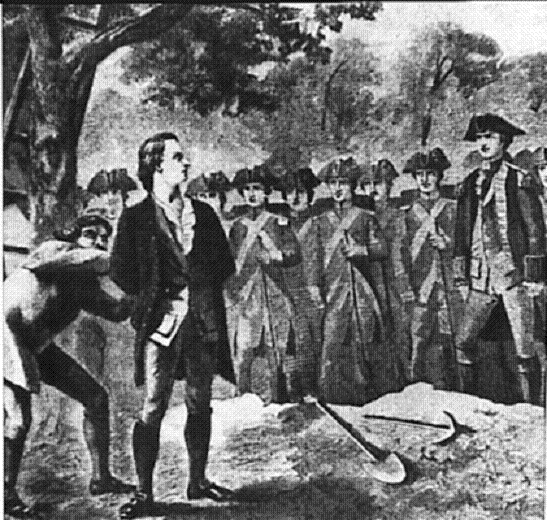
The British hang Nathan Hale in New York City, 1776

According to the standards of the time, spies were hanged as illegal combatants. By all accounts, Hale comported himself well before the hanging. Frederick MacKensie, a British officer, wrote this diary entry for the day:

He behaved with great composure and resolution, saying he thought it the duty of every good Officer, to obey any orders given him by his Commander-in-Chief; and desired the Spectators to be at all times prepared to meet death in whatever shape it might appear.

On the morning of September 22, 1776, Hale was marched along Post Road to the Park of Artillery, which was next to a public house called the Dove Tavern (at modern-day 66th Street and Third Avenue), and hanged. He was 21 years old.

No official records were kept of Hale's final speech. It has traditionally been reported that his last words, either entirely or in part, were: "I only regret that I have but one life to lose for my country." The account of the quote originated with British Captain John Montresor, who was present at the hanging. The next day, he spoke with American Captain William Hull under a flag of truce. Hull recorded in his memoirs the following quote by Montresor:

"On the morning of his execution," continued the officer, "my station was near the fatal spot, and I requested the Provost Marshal [William Cunningham] to permit the prisoner to sit in my marquee, while he was making the necessary preparations. Captain Hale entered: he was calm, and bore himself with gentle dignity, in the consciousness of rectitude and high intentions. He asked for writing materials, which I furnished him: he wrote two letters, one to his mother and one to a brother officer. He was shortly after summoned to the gallows. But a few persons were around him, yet his characteristic dying words were remembered. He said, 'I only regret, that I have but one life to lose for my country.'"

Because Hull was not an eyewitness to Hale's speech, some historians have questioned the reliability of this account.

Over the years, there has been a great deal of speculation as to whether Hale uttered this line or some variation of it. If Hale did not originate the statement, it is possible he instead repeated a passage from Joseph Addison's play Cato, which was widely popular at the time and an ideological inspiration to many Patriots:

How beautiful is death, when earn'd by virtue!
Who would not be that youth? What pity is it
That we can die but once to serve our country.

It is almost certain that Hale's last speech was longer than one sentence. Several early accounts mention different things he said. These are not necessarily contradictory, but rather, together they give an idea of what the speech might have been like. The following quotes are all taken from George Dudley Seymour's book, Documentary Life of Nathan Hale, published in 1941 by the author. Enoch Hale, Nathan's brother, wrote in his diary after he questioned people who had been present, October 26, 1776, "When at the Gallows he spoke & told them that he was a Capt in the Cont Army by name Nathan Hale." The February 13, 1777, issue of the Essex Journal stated, "However, at the gallows, he made a sensible and spirited speech; among other things, told them they were shedding the blood of the innocent, and that if he had ten thousand lives, he would lay them all down, if called to it, in defence of his injured, bleeding Country." The May 17, 1781, issue of the Independent Chronicle and the Universal Advertiser gave the following version: "I am so satisfied with the cause in which I have engaged, that my only regret is, that I have not more lives than one to offer in its service."

Aside from the site at 66th Street and Third Avenue, two other sites in Manhattan claim to be the hanging site:

- City Hall Park, where a statue of Hale designed by Frederick William MacMonnies was erected in 1890
- Inside Grand Central Terminal

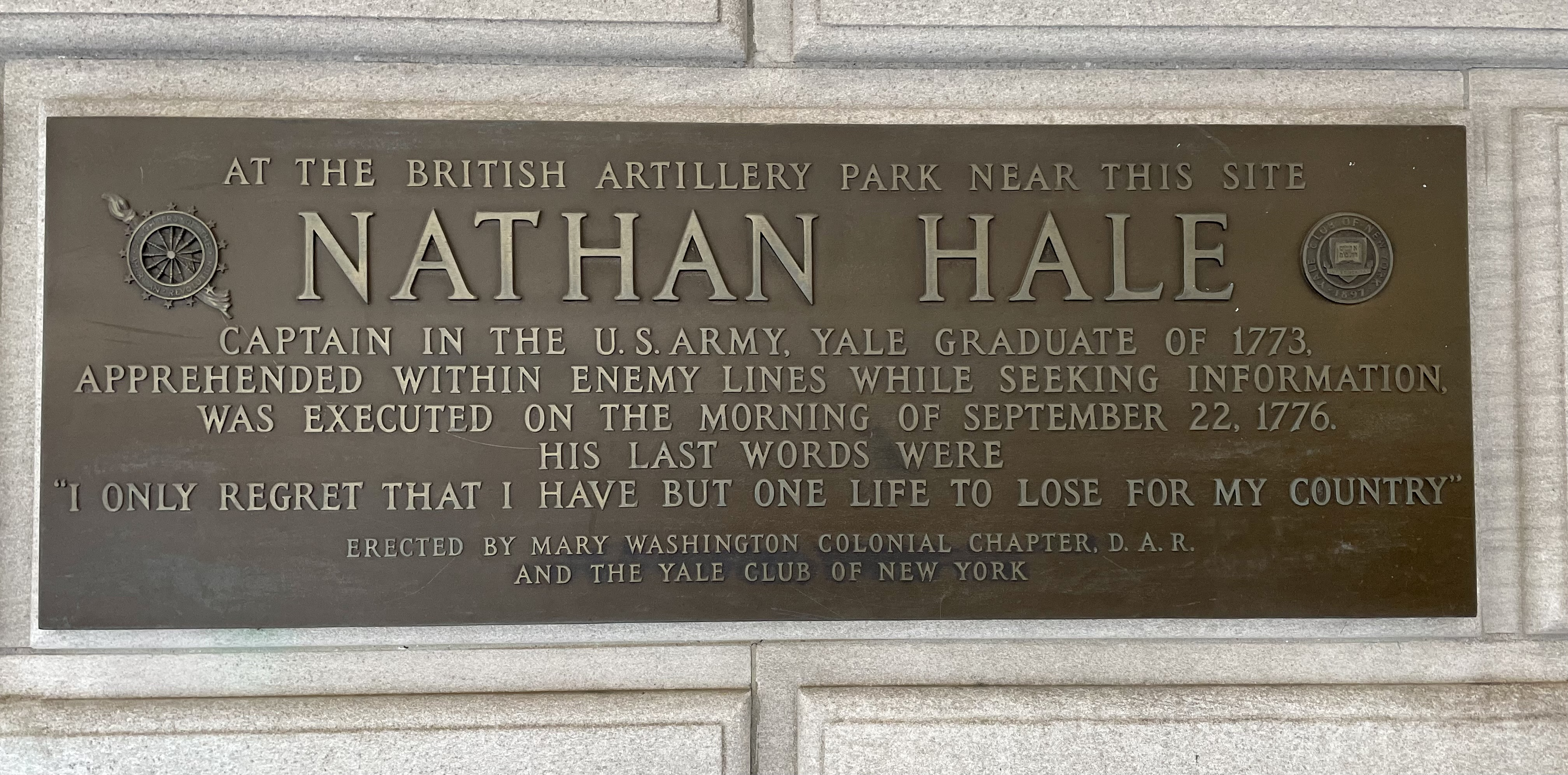
Yale Club plaque

The Yale Club bears a plaque hung by the Daughters of the American Revolution which states the event occurred "near" the Club. Yale is Hale's alma mater and the Club is at 44th Street and Vanderbilt Avenue, mere feet from Grand Central Terminal. Another account places Hale's execution at Bergen Beach, Brooklyn, but there is no evidence to support this claim.

Hale's body was never found. His family erected an empty grave cenotaph in Nathan Hale Cemetery in South Coventry Historic District, Connecticut.

== Legacy ==
=== Statues and appearance ===
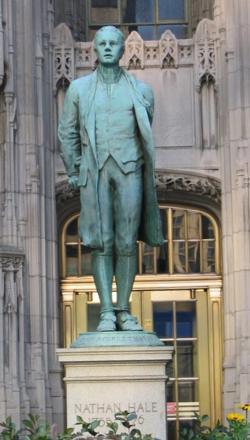
Statue by Bela Pratt at the Tribune Tower, Chicago

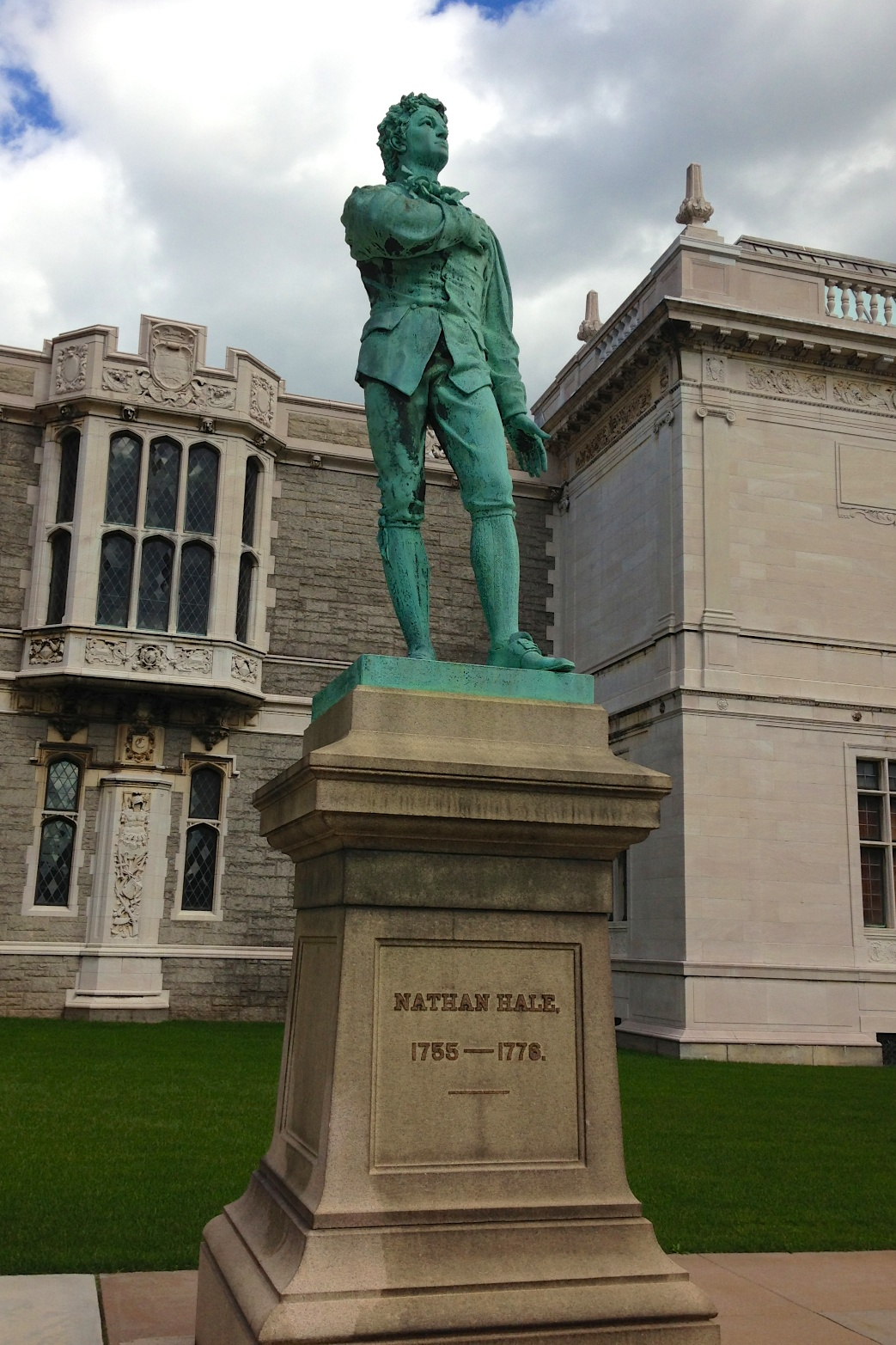
Statue by Enoch Smith Woods at Wadsworth Atheneum, Hartford, Connecticut, erected 1893

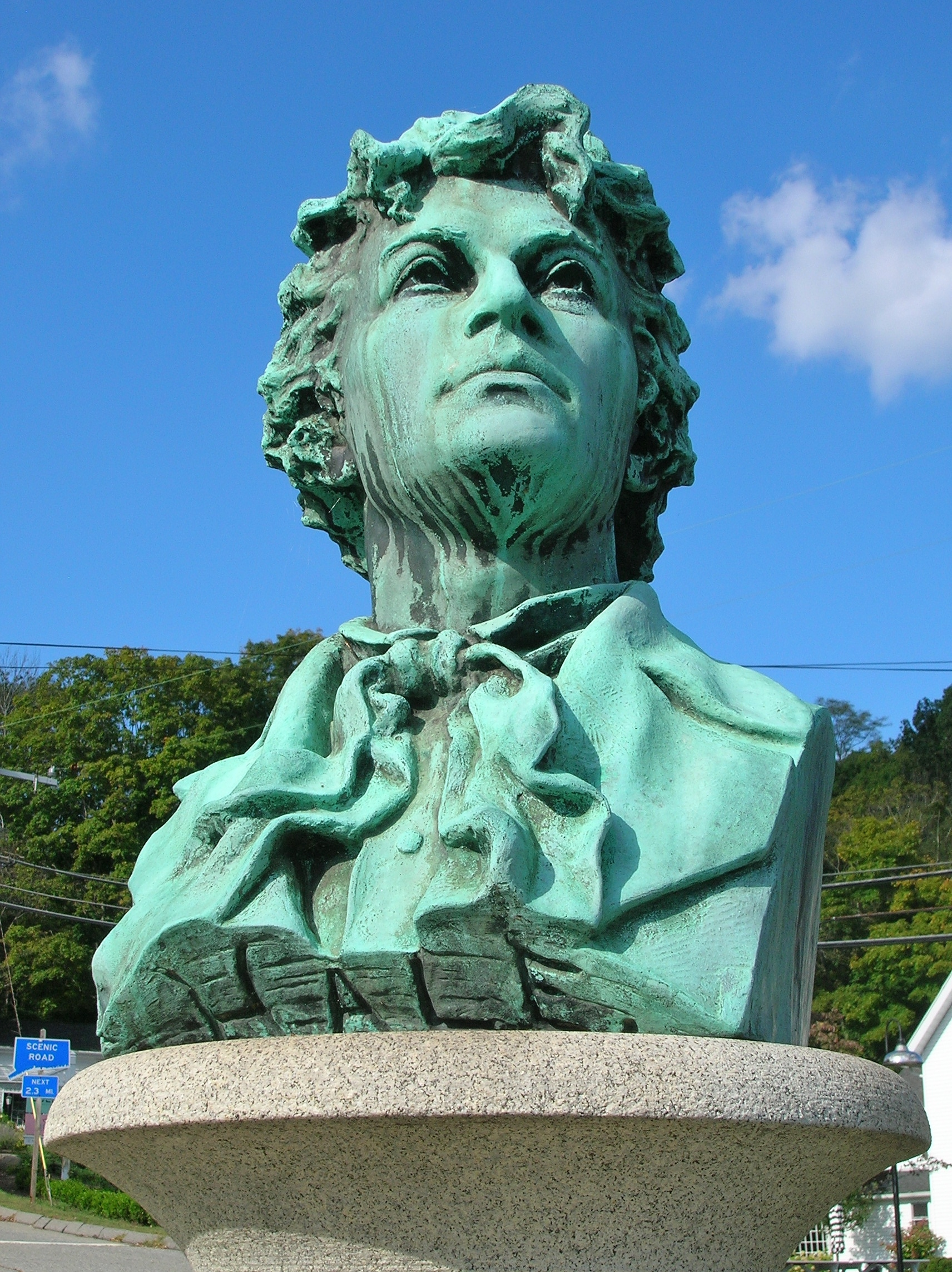
Bust in East Haddam, Connecticut, sculpted by Enoch Smith Woods between 1885 and 1900

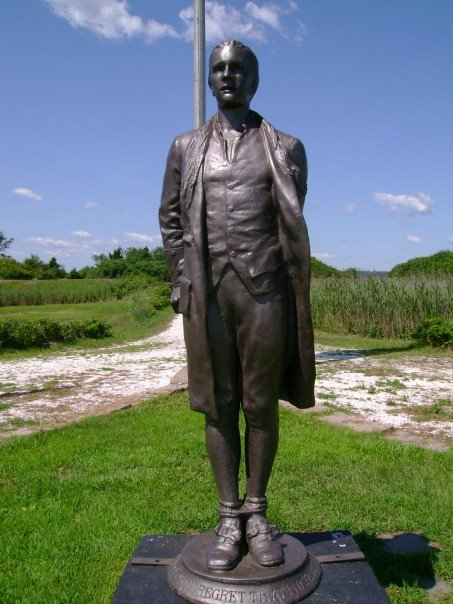
Statue by Bela Lyon Pratt at Fort Nathan Hale

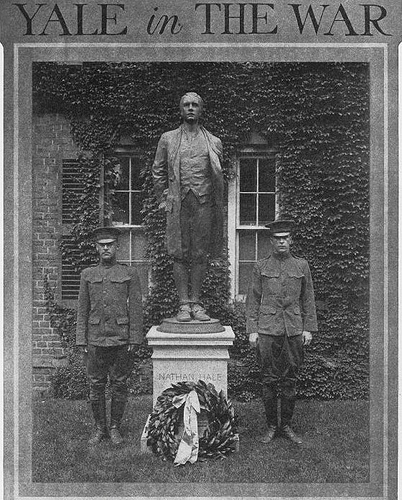
Nathan Hale statue flanked by Yale servicemen, Yale campus, New Haven, Connecticut, November 1917

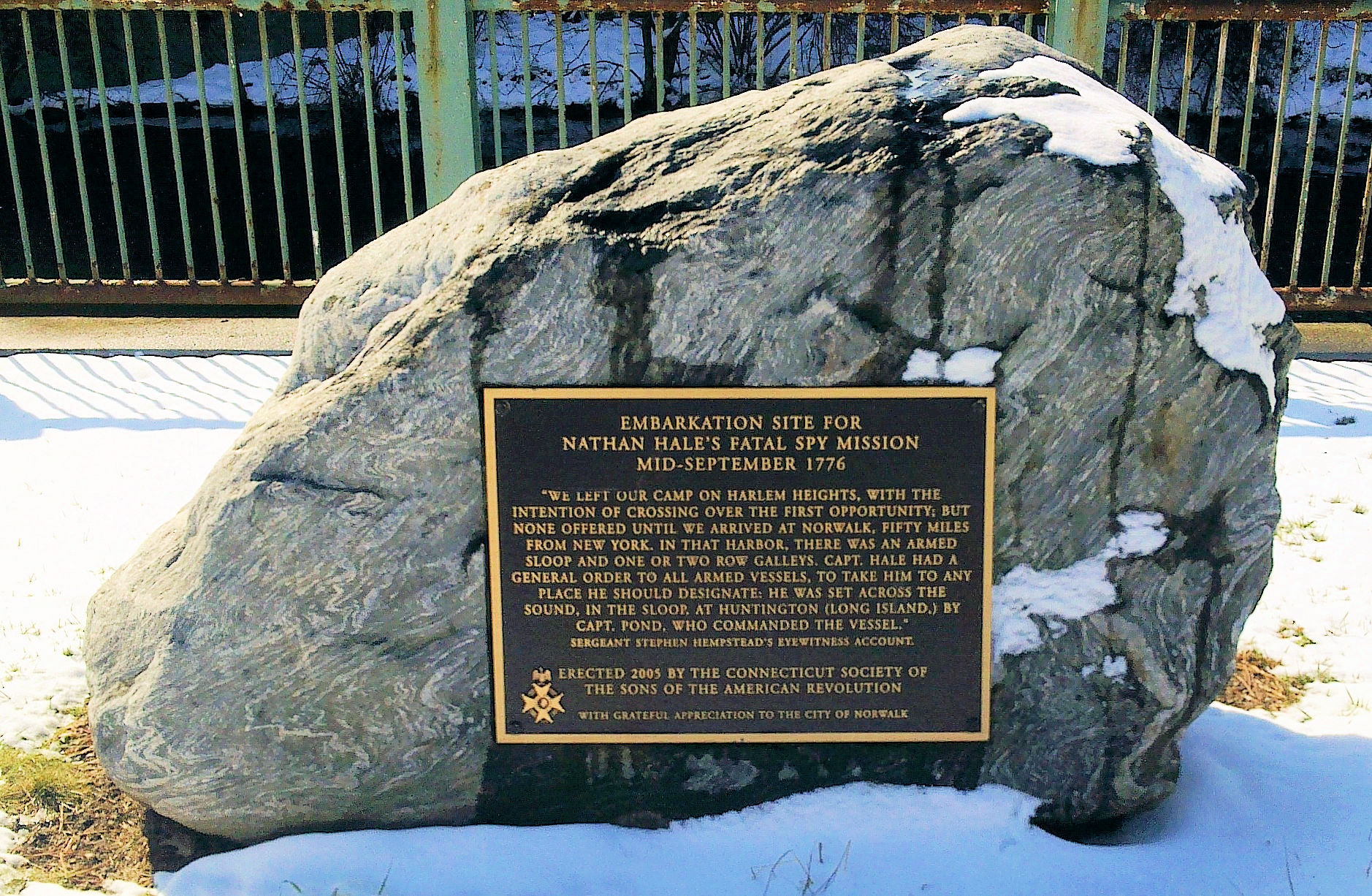
Marker in Freese Park, Norwalk, Connecticut that is denoted as the embarkation point for Hale's fatal mission

Statues of Hale are based on idealized archetypes; no contemporaneous portraits of him have been found. Documents and letters reveal Hale was an informed, practical, detail-oriented man who planned ahead. Of his appearance and demeanor, fellow soldier Lieutenant Elisha Bostwick wrote that Hale had blue eyes, flaxen blond hair, darker eyebrows, and stood slightly taller than the average height of the time, with mental powers of a sedate mind and piousness. Bostwick wrote:

I can now in imagination see his person & hear his voice—his person I should say was a little above the common stature in height, his shoulders of a moderate breadth, his limbs strait & very plump: regular features—very fair skin—blue eyes—flaxen or very light hair which was always kept short—his eyebrows a shade darker than his hair & his voice rather sharp or piercing—his bodily agility was remarkable. I have seen him follow a football and kick it over the tops of the trees in the Bowery at New York, (an exercise which he was fond of)—his mental powers seemed to be above the common sort—his mind of a sedate and sober cast, & he was undoubtedly Pious; for it was remark'd that when any of the soldiers of his company were sick he always visited them & usually Prayed for & with them in their sickness.

Hale has been honored with a number of standing images:

- A statue designed by Frederick William MacMonnies was dedicated on the anniversary of Evacuation Day, November 25, 1893, at City Hall Park, New York. The statue established Hale's modern idealized square-jawed image. A copy of MacMonnies's statue stands in Williams Park in New London, Connecticut.
- A statue of Hale, sculpted 1908–1912 by Bela Pratt, was cast in 1912 and stands in front of Connecticut Hall, where Hale resided while at Yale. Copies of this sculpture stand at the Phillips Academy in Andover, Massachusetts; the Nathan Hale Homestead in Coventry; the Connecticut Governor's Residence in Hartford, Connecticut; Fort Nathan Hale in New Haven, Connecticut; Mitchell College in New London, Connecticut; the Department of Justice in Washington, D.C.; at the Tribune Tower in Chicago; at the headquarters of the Central Intelligence Agency in Langley, Virginia.; and in front of the Robert F. Kennedy Department of Justice Building in Washington, D.C.
- A statue by Enoch Smith Woods in bronze, dating from 1889, was installed in 1893 at the Wadsworth Atheneum.
- A statue of Hale by Karl Gerhardt (1886) on the first floor of the Connecticut State Capitol in Hartford includes an inscription of his reported last words.
- A statue of Hale is displayed at the Tulane University Law School reading room.
- A statue by William Ordway Partridge, at the corner of Summit and Portland Avenues in Saint Paul, Minnesota, was installed in 1907.

Other markers include:

- A memorial for him located in Huntington, New York, where he landed for his fatal spying mission.
- A historical marker in Freese Park, Norwalk, Connecticut, that is denoted as the embarkation point.
- A 45-foot (14 m) obelisk known as the Captain Nathan Hale Monument was erected in his honor in 1846 in his birthplace of Coventry, Connecticut.

In January 1899 a play based on Hale's life, Nathan Hale by Clyde Fitch, opened at New York's Knickerbocker Theatre, where it played successfully for eight weeks. It then toured for more than a year, with 41-year-old Nat Goodwin playing Hale and Goodwin's wife Maxine Elliott playing Alice Adams.

=== Namesake items ===
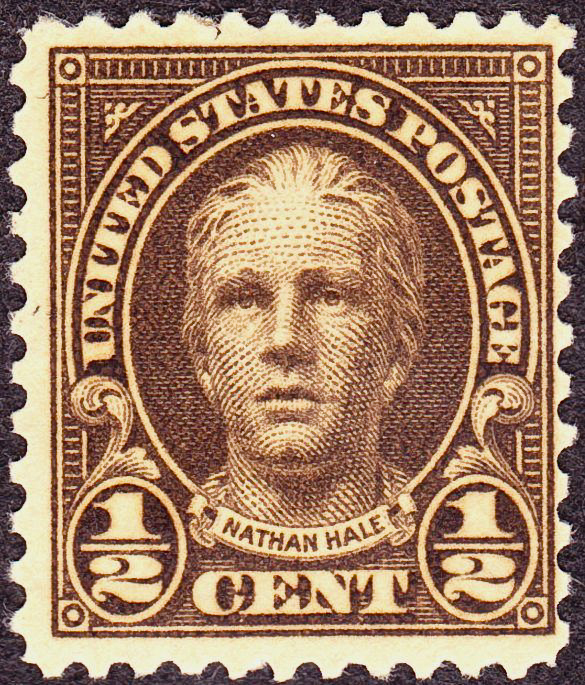
Nathan Hale appeared on U.S. postage stamps issued in 1925 and 1929. The likeness is from a statue by Bela Lyon Pratt.

- The hamlet of Halesite, New York (formerly Huntington Harbor) on Long Island is named after Hale. There is a memorial plaque set into a large boulder, which was removed from the beach nearby where Hale is thought to have landed on his fateful mission.
- Nathan Hale Army Depot, a U.S. Army installation, is located in Darmstadt, Germany.
- Fort Nathan Hale, a Revolutionary War-era fort and historic site in New Haven, Connecticut, is named after him.
- The Nathan Hale dormitory on the University of Connecticut campus in Storrs, Connecticut, is named after Hale.
- The Nathan Hale dormitory, traditionally a freshman girls' dorm, at Phillips Academy in Andover, Massachusetts, is named after Hale.
- The Nathan Hale Center at Robert Morris University, dedicated in 1971, is a classroom building located on campus.
- Nathan Hale Hall is a building at Farmingdale State College in Farmingdale, New York, which is home to Biology and Art Centers.
- Nathan Hale Hall is a barracks building at Fort George G. Meade, Maryland.
- Nathan Hale Hall is the main academic building at Mitchell College in New London, Connecticut.
- The Nathan Hale Memorial Chapter of the Daughters of the American Revolution was organized June 6, 1900, in East Haddam, Connecticut. The ceremony took place at the one-room schoolhouse where he once taught.
- High schools named after Hale include Nathan Hale-Ray High School in East Haddam, Connecticut (where he was schoolmaster), Nathan Hale High School in Seattle, Washington, and high schools in West Allis, Wisconsin, and Tulsa, Oklahoma.
- Middle schools named after Hale include Nathan Hale-Ray Middle School in East Haddam, Connecticut; Nathan Hale Middle School in Norwalk, Connecticut (the departure point for his final mission); and Captain Nathan Hale Middle School in Coventry, Connecticut (his birthplace); as well as middle schools in Northvale, New Jersey; Omaha, Nebraska; Cleveland, Ohio; and Crestwood, Illinois.
- There are elementary schools named after Hale in Roxbury, Boston; New London, Connecticut; Enfield, Connecticut; Manchester, Connecticut; Meriden, Connecticut; New Haven, Connecticut; Whiting, Indiana; Schaumburg, Illinois; Lansing, Illinois; Crestwood, Illinois; Chicago, Illinois; Carteret, New Jersey; Northvale, New Jersey; Mesa, Arizona; and Minneapolis, Minnesota.
- The United States Navy submarine USS Nathan Hale (SSBN-623) was named in his honor.
- The Nathan Hale Ancient Fife and Drum Corps from Coventry, Connecticut, is named after him and includes a division called Knowlton's Connecticut Rangers.
- "Nathaniel Hale" Battalion is the name of the Battalion for Army ROTC based at the University of Connecticut, with Knowlton Company (Company A) at the University of Connecticut and Sillman Company (Company B) at Sacred Heart University.
- Campsite Nathan Hale at Baiting Hollow Scout Camp, Baiting Hollow, New York.

=== Ballads ===
Two early ballads attempt to recreate Hale's last speech. Songs and Ballads of the Revolution (1855), collected by F. Moore, contained the "Ballad of Nathan Hale" (anonymous), dated 1776: "Thou pale king of terrors, thou life's gloomy foe, Go frighten the slave; go frighten the slave; Tell tyrants, to you their allegiance they owe. No fears for the brave; no fears for the brave."; and "To the Memory of Capt. Nathan Hale", by Eneas Munson Sr., was written soon after Hale's death:

"Hate of oppression's arbitrary plan,
The love of freedom, and the rights of man;
A strong desire to save from slavery's chain
The future millions of the western main,
And hand down safe, from men's invention cleared,
The sacred truths which all the just revered;
For ends like these, I wish to draw my breath,"
He bravely cried, "or dare encounter death."
And when a cruel wretch pronounced his doom,
Replied, "'Tis well, – for all is peace to come;
The sacred cause for which I drew my sword
Shall yet prevail, and peace shall be restored.
I've served with zeal the land that gave me birth,
Fulfilled my course, and done my work on earth;
Have ever aimed to tread that shining road
That leads a mortal to the blessed God.
I die resigned, and quit life's empty stage,
For brighter worlds my every wish engage;
And while my body slumbers in the dust,
My soul shall join the assemblies of the just."

Munson had tutored Hale before college, and knew him and his family well, so even though the particulars of this speech may be unlikely, Munson knew first-hand what Hale's opinions were.

== See also ==
- Intelligence in the American Revolutionary War
- Intelligence operations in the American Revolutionary War
- Nathan Hale Homestead
- Kusunoki Masashige – a Japanese samurai, also famous for his last words before execution
- Daniel Hale, a descendant equally tried for espionage
- Liberty's Kids episode 16
