= Folsom House =

Historic house in Minnesota, United States

- U.S. Historic district – Contributing property
- Minnesota State Register of Historic Places
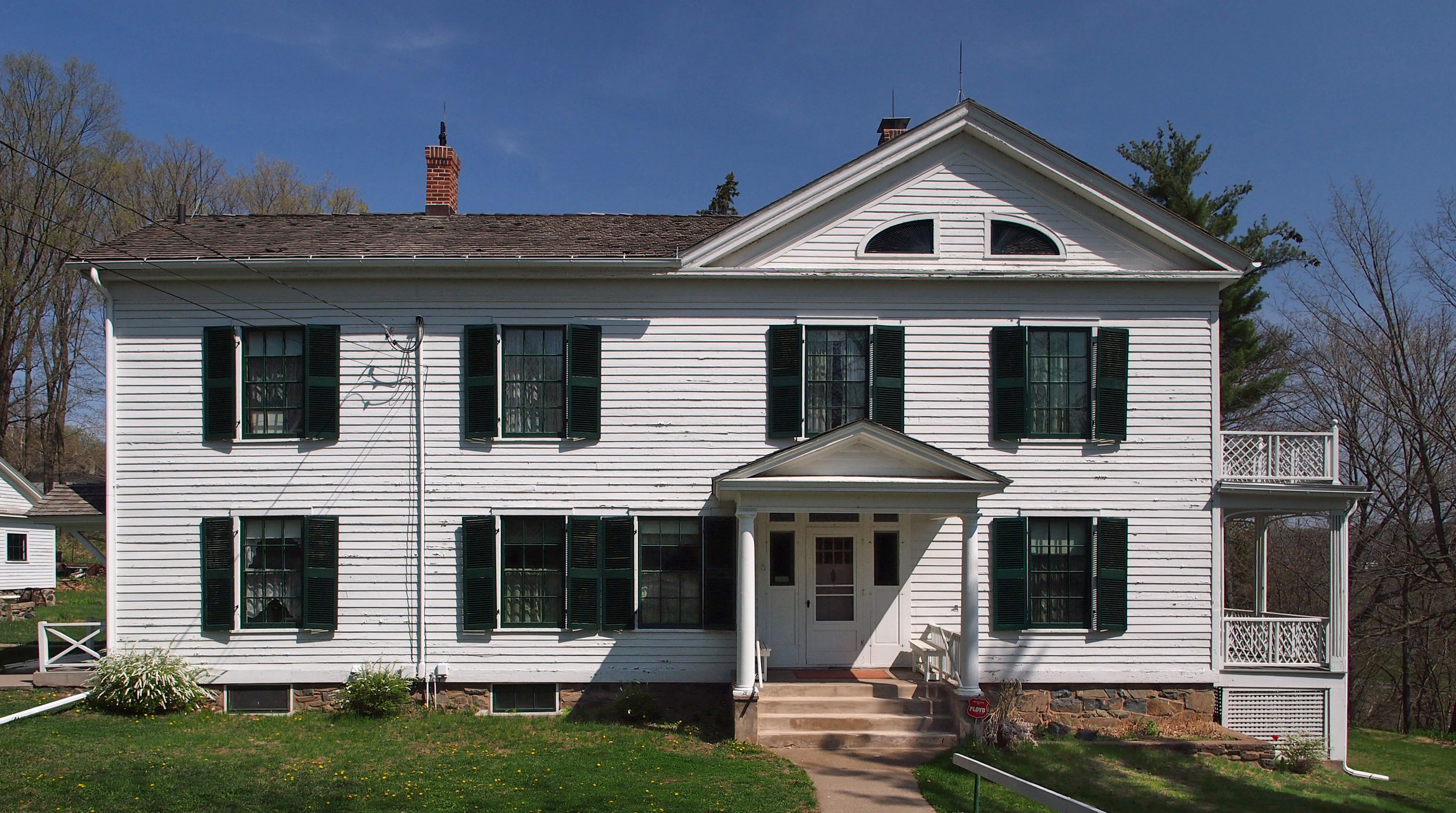
- The Folsom House viewed from the south

- Location within Minnesota Location within the United States
- Location: 272 W. Government St., Taylors Falls, Minnesota
- Coordinates: 45°24′2″N 92°39′15″W
- Built: 1854
- Architectural style: Greek Revival/Federal
- Part of: Angel's Hill Historic District (ID72000675)
- Designated CP: April 11, 1972

The Folsom House is a historic house museum in Taylors Falls, Minnesota, United States.

== Description and history ==
It is the restored former home of lumber magnate W.H.C. Folsom, who moved his family to the area in 1850. Folsom served as state representative for one term and state senator for six terms. The house is run by a partnership between the Taylors Falls Historical Society and the Minnesota Historical Society. It is in the Angel's Hill Historic District of Taylors Falls, a New England–style village. The home is furnished with the family's original belongings, including a Hews rectangular grand piano, Folsom's library, and other personal effects.

The house is one of two notable former Folsom properties. In Prairie du Chien, Wisconsin, the W.H.C. Folsom House is listed on the National Register of Historic Places.
