= Justice Knowlton =

Justice Knowlton may refer to:

- Luke Knowlton (1738–1810), associate justice of the Vermont Supreme Court
- Marcus Perrin Knowlton (1839–1918), chief justice of the Massachusetts Supreme Judicial Court
- Wiram Knowlton (1816–1863), associate justice of the Wisconsin Supreme Court
