= Nathan Hale Schoolhouse (East Haddam) =

Historic site in East Haddam, Connecticut, U.S.

Coordinates: 41°27′18″N 72°27′48″W

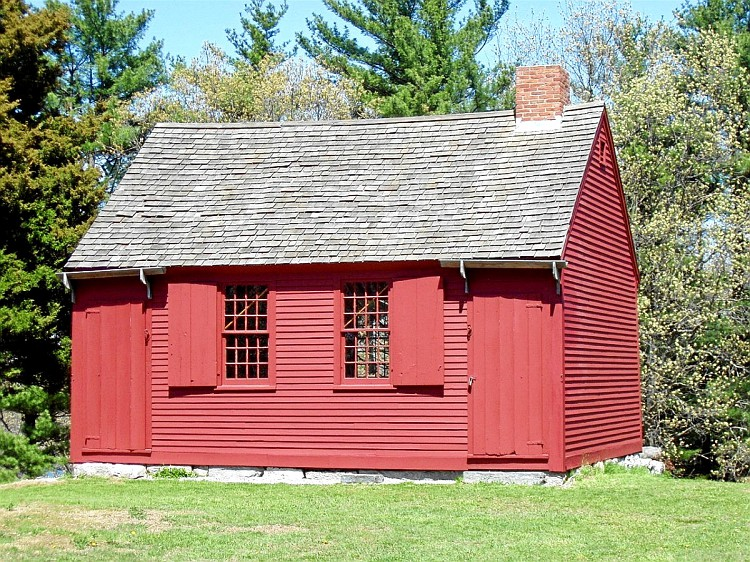
Nathan Hale Schoolhouse

The Nathan Hale Schoolhouse is a historic site in East Haddam, Connecticut. In the winter of 1773, Nathan Hale briefly taught in this one-room schoolhouse before leaving East Haddam for another teaching position in New London, Connecticut. The schoolhouse is owned and operated by the Connecticut Society of the Sons of the American Revolution.

== History ==
The original schoolhouse was built in 1750 and served as the "First Society School" until 1799. In 1800 it was moved north on Main Street to land which is currently the site of St. Stephen's Episcopal Church. During this time, it was the private residence of Captain Elijah Atwood and his family. In 1899 the building was turned over, in trust, to Colonel Richard Henry Greene and the New York Society of the Sons of the Revolution. In 1900, the New York Society deeded the schoolhouse to the Connecticut Society Sons of the Revolution. By 1900, the schoolhouse was moved up the hill to a location behind St. Stephen's Episcopal Church on property overlooking the Connecticut River. Since 1974, the Connecticut Society of the Sons of the American Revolution have maintained and overseen the schoolhouse with the support of the Nathan Hale Memorial Chapter of the Daughters of the American Revolution.

=== Hale's time in East Haddam ===
Hale accepted the position as schoolmaster in East Haddam after graduating from Yale University in 1773. Hale's tenure in East Haddam lasted from roughly October 1773 to March 1774. During his time in East Haddam, Hale wrote to a college classmate about his "remote life in the wilderness called Moodus." Hale also received a letter in January 1774 from a classmate that read: "I am at a loss to determine whether you are yet in this Land of the living, or removed to some far distant & to us unknown region; but thus much I am certain of, that if you departed this life at [Moodus] you stood but a narrow chance for gaining a better." Dissatisfied with life in East Haddam, Hale departed for a job at the Union Grammar School in New London, Connecticut in the Spring of 1774.

=== Dedication ===
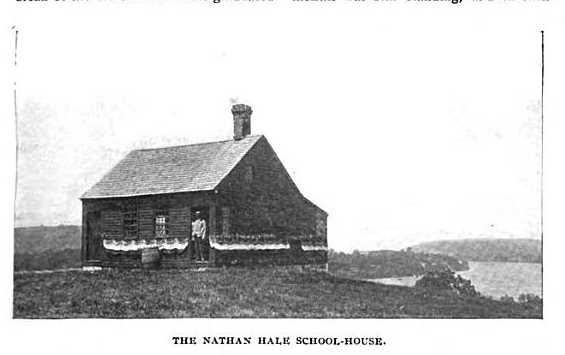
The schoolhouse, circa 1900

On July 6, 1900, the town of East Haddam held a celebration commemorating the bi-centennial of the town as well as the dedication of the newly relocated schoolhouse. The day's ceremonies included the turning over of the schoolhouse from the New York Society of the Sons of the Revolution to the Connecticut chapter of the organization. During the ceremony the deeds to the building were presented to Morgan G. Buckeley, the President of the Connecticut Society of the Sons of the Revolution. At the time of the dedication, "the schoolhouse had been remodeled to insure its return, as nearly as possible, to the form it was in Hale's time." The bust was erected in 1905 with the support of the Nathan Hale Memorial Chapter of the Daughters of the American Revolution.

On the same day, a bronze bust of Hale was also unveiled with plans to have the bust erected at the original site of the schoolhouse. In his speech on the day of the dedication, Morgan G. Buckeley proclaimed, "The bronze bust of the martyr spy ... will stand on the original site of the schoolhouse for the years to come as a memorial to the gentle life which Hale so unselfishly gave to his country."

== Events ==
The Nathan Hale Memorial Chapter of the Daughters of the American Revolution host an annual picnic. The picnic is held on or around June 6, Nathan Hale's birthday.

== Visiting ==
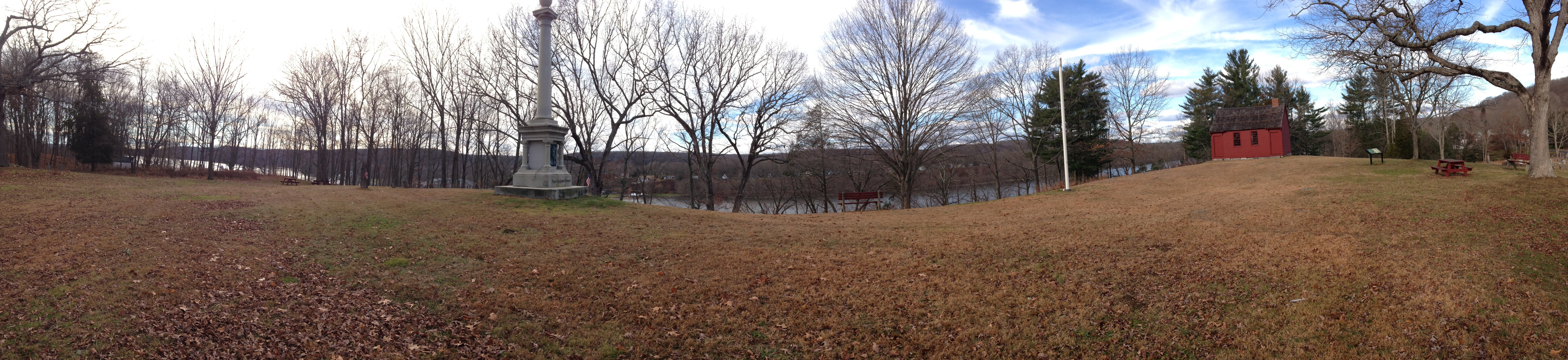
Monument to Maj. Gen. Joseph Spencer in left foreground, with Nathan Hale Schoolhouse in right background

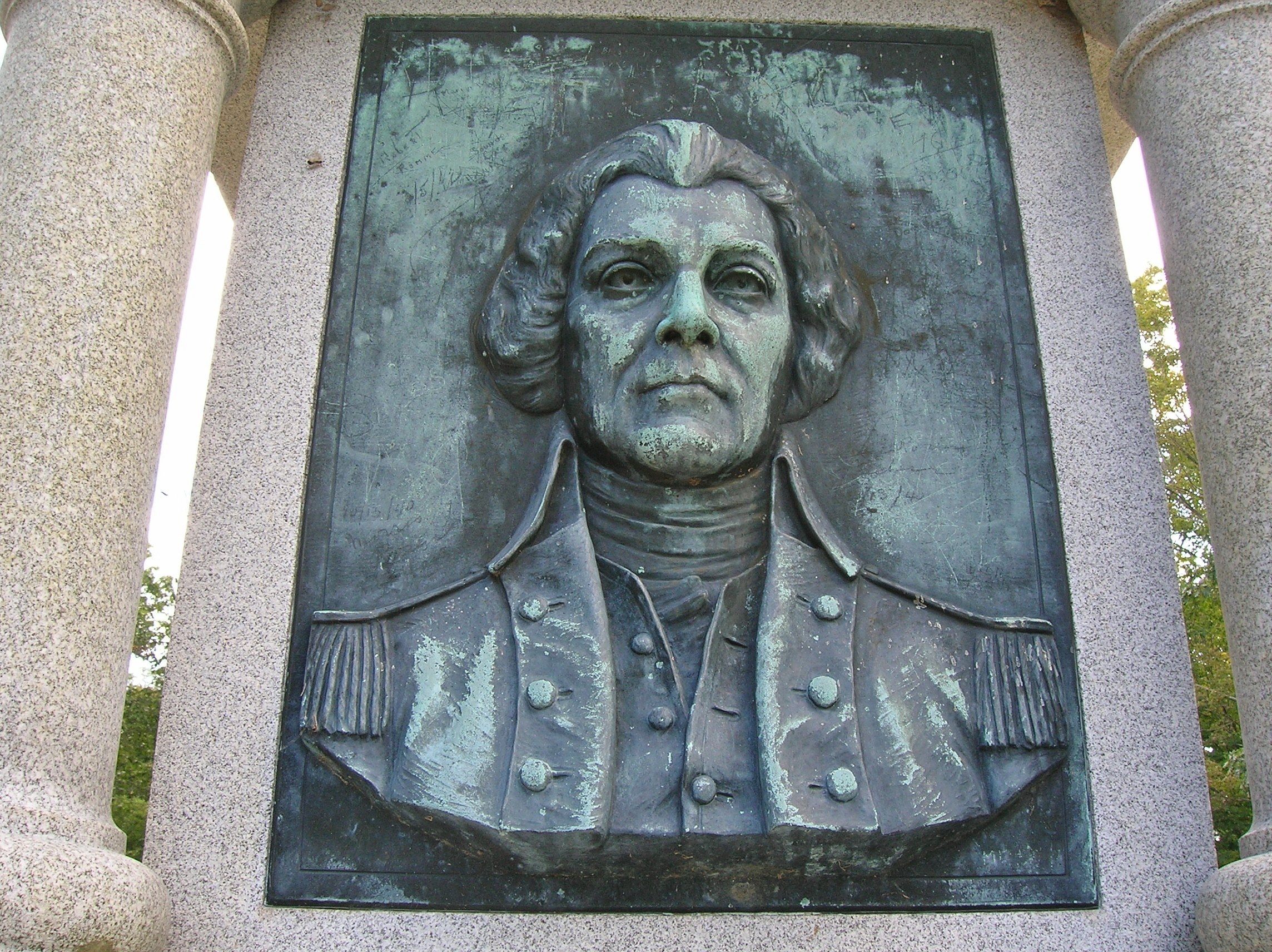
Close up of bas relief bust of Maj. Gen. Joseph Spencer on his monument.

The schoolhouse is open for tours Wednesdays through Sunday, Noon to 4 PM, from Memorial Day to Columbus Day. There is no admission fee. The schoolhouse has been "authentically furnished" by the Nathan Hale Memorial Chapter of the Daughters of the American Revolution.
