= James Larsin =

American politician

James Larsin (May 25, 1855 – ?) was an American ship carpenter and fisherman from Menekaunee, Wisconsin who spent one term as a Union Labor Party member of the Wisconsin State Assembly from Marinette County.

== Background ==
Larsin was born in Denmark on May 25, 1855. He became a fisherman and ship carpenter by trade. He came to Wisconsin in 1871, and settled in Racine, where he remained till 1879, when he moved to Door County and lived there three years (during that time, in 1880, he was awarded a Lifesaving Medal for the rescue from drowning of seven persons off North Bay in that county). He then settled in Marinette County.

== Public office ==
Larsin was serving as an alderman for the City of Marinette (which had annexed Menekaunee) when he was elected in 1890 from the Assembly's Marinette County district as a Union Labor Party candidate, with 1,465 votes to 1034 for Republican Charles Reinke and 179 for Prohibitionist Jacob Lindern (Democratic incumbent Patrick Clifford was not a candidate for re-election). The only Union Labor member elected to either house that year, he was assigned to the standing committees on roads and bridges, and on labor and manufactures.

He ran for re-election in 1892 on the Populist ticket, but came in fourth in a four-way race with 6.51% of the vote, with the seat being claimed by Democrat Charles Daily.

== Personal life ==
At the time of his election, he was married.
