= W.H.C. Folsom House =

Historic house in Wisconsin, United States

- U.S. National Register of Historic Places
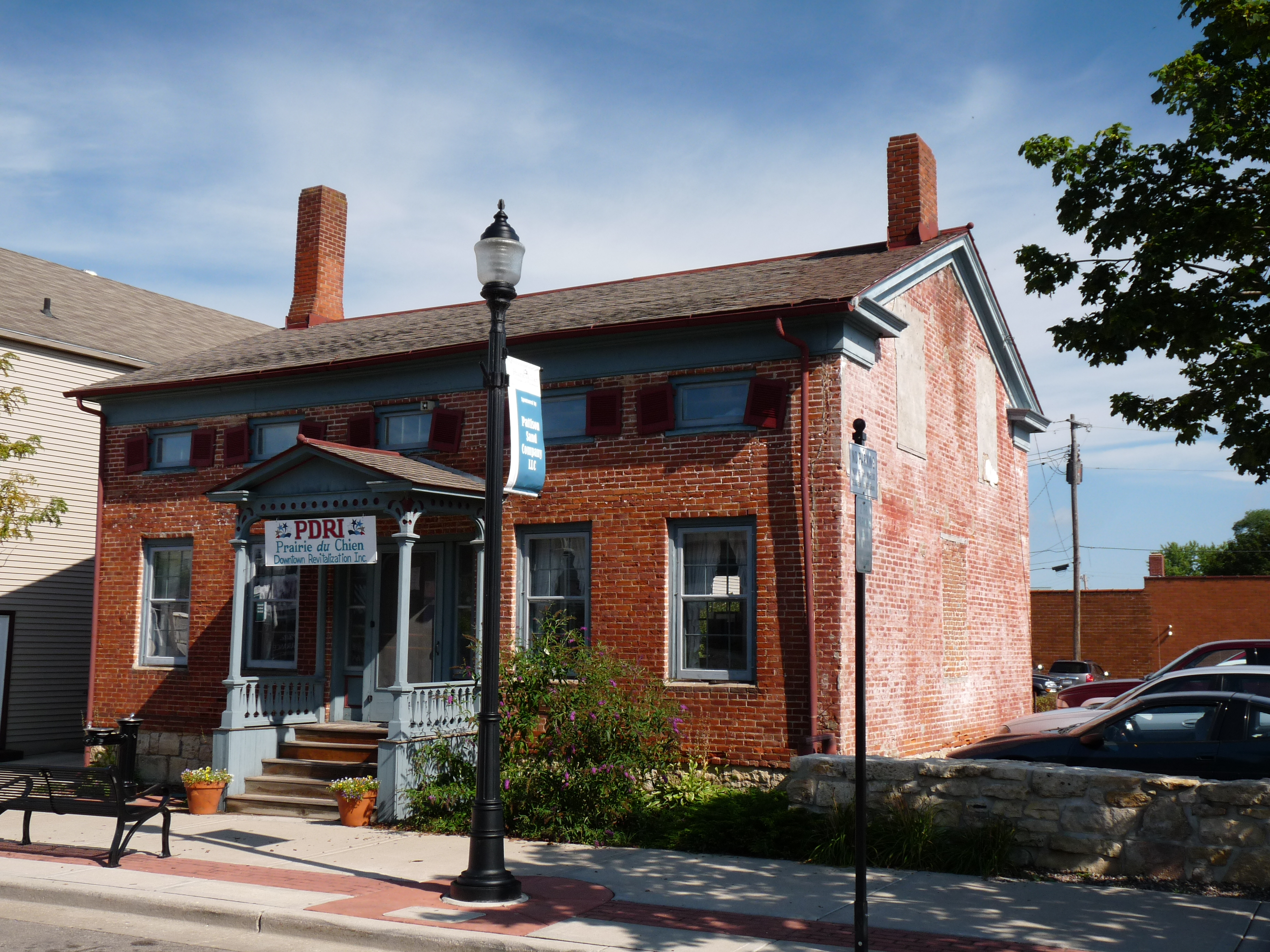
- W.H.C. Folsom House
- Location: 109 Blackhawk Ave., Prairie du Chien, Wisconsin
- Coordinates: 43°03′06″N 91°08′49″W
- Area: less than one acre
- Built: 1842
- Architectural style: Greek Revival
- NRHP reference No.: 84000692
- Added to NRHP: December 6, 1984

The W.H.C. Folsom House is located in Prairie du Chien, Wisconsin.

== History ==
The house was built for W.H.C. Folsom, a Canadian immigrant who was later a member of the Minnesota House of Representatives and the Minnesota State Senate. During the Mexican–American War, Wiram Knowlton, another noted politician, used it as a recruiting location and artist John Muir worked at the house as a printer. In addition, it served as a clubhouse.

The house is one of two historic properties that belonged to Folsom, the other being the Folsom House in Taylors Falls, Minnesota. It was listed on the National Register of Historic Places in 1984 and on the State Register of Historic Places in 1989.
