= Menekaunee, Wisconsin =

- Former village
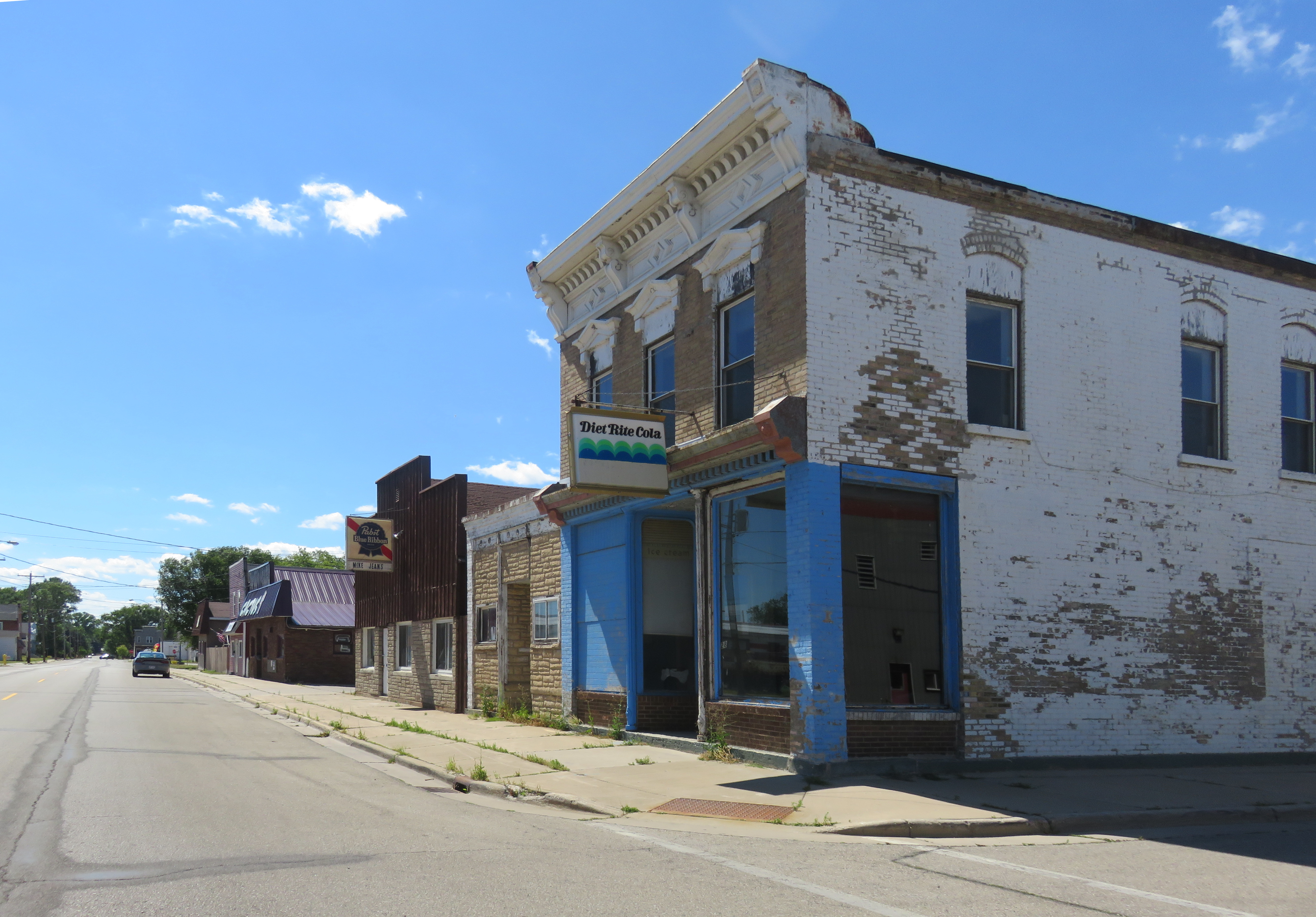

- Location within Wisconsin Location within the United States
- Coordinates: 45.088°N 87.596°W
- Country: United States
- State: Wisconsin
- County: Marinette
- Elevation: 585 ft (178 m)
- Time zone: UTC-6 (Central (CST))
  - Summer (DST): UTC-5 (CDT)
- Area code: 715 & 534

Menekaunee also spelled Minikani or Menekaune, was a village in Marinette County, Wisconsin, United States; it is now a neighborhood of the City of Marinette.

== Geography ==
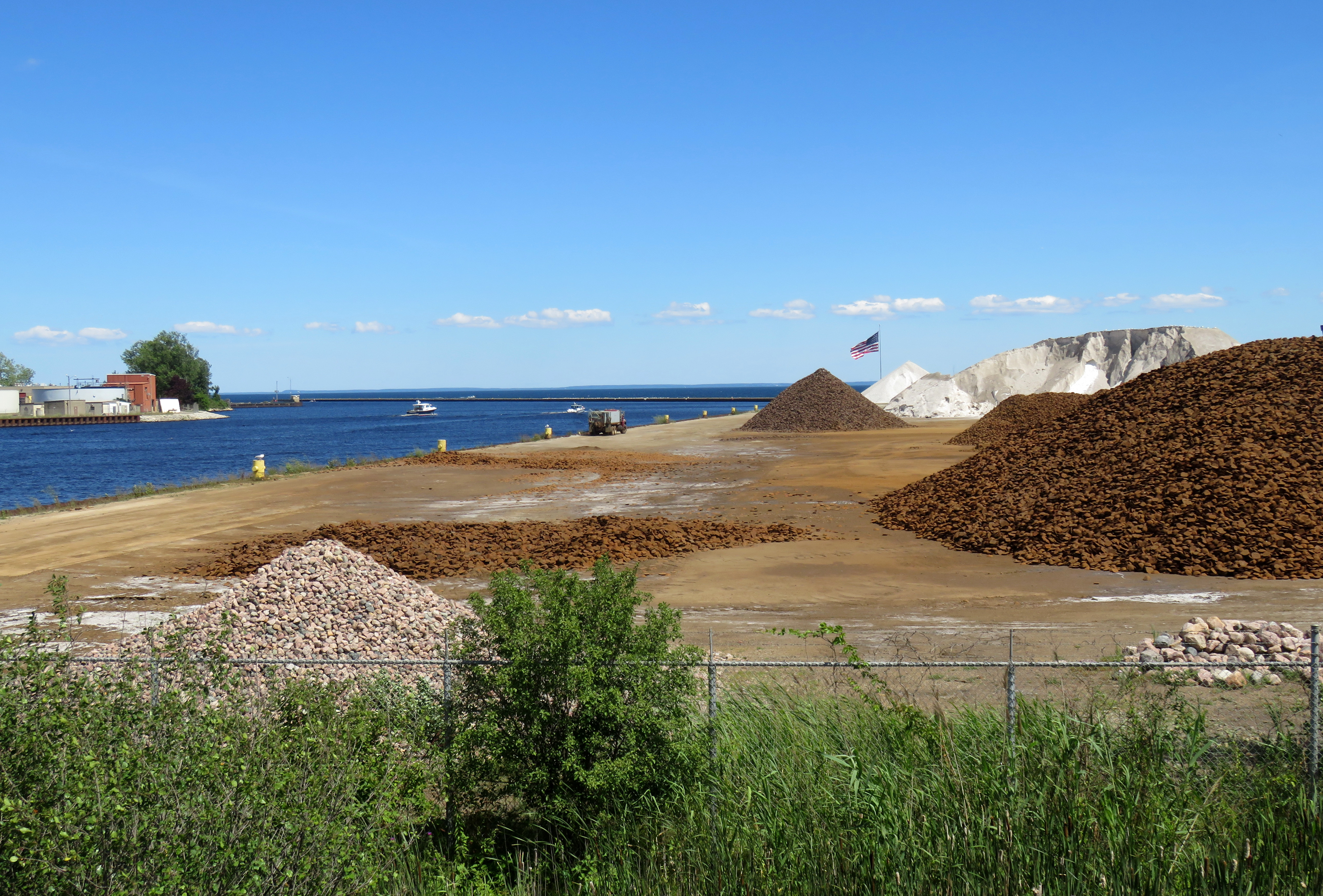
Menekaunee Harbor

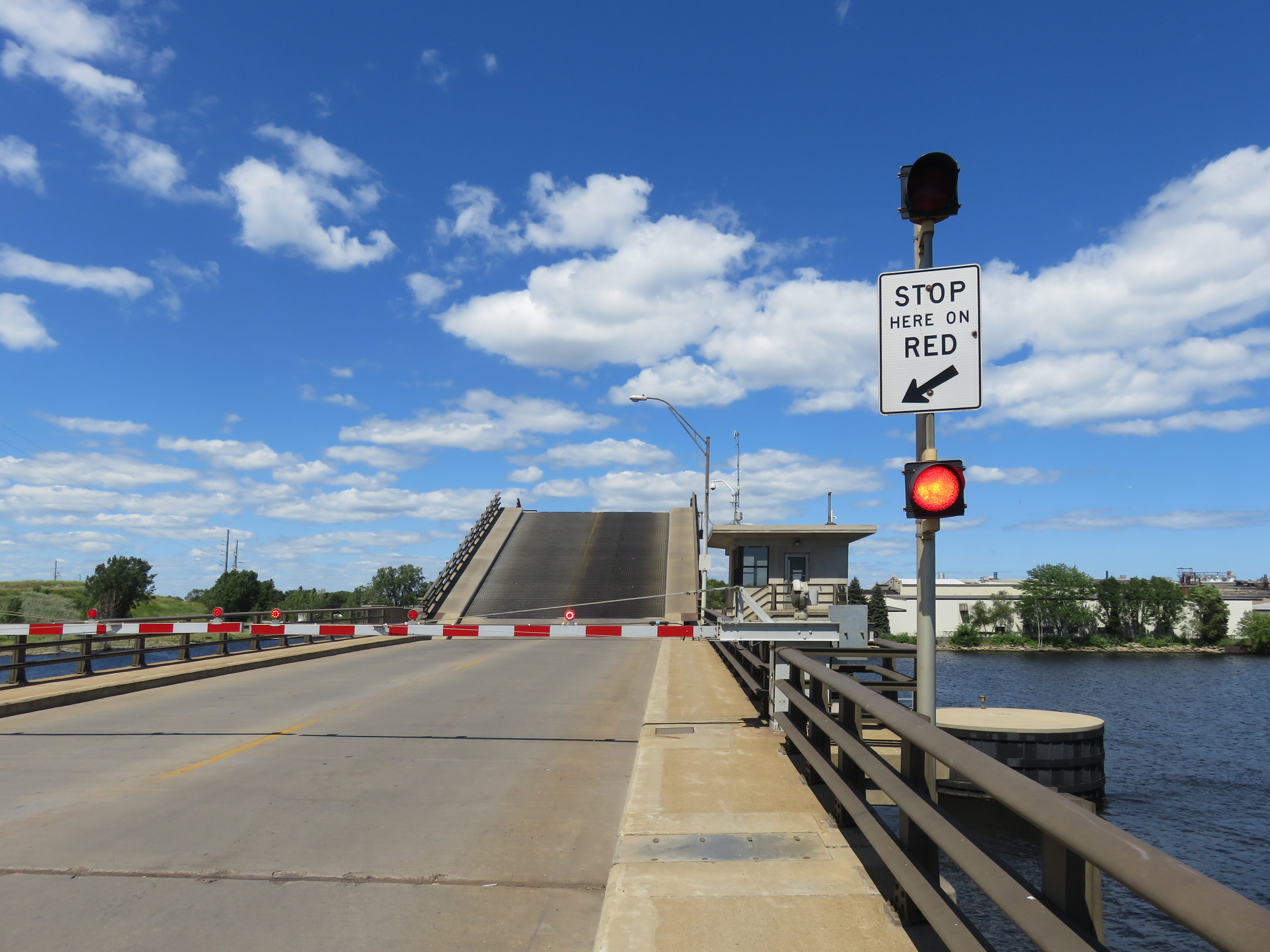
The Menekaunee Bridge

Menekaunee is located in the easternmost part of Marinette, on the right bank of the Menominee River. Menekaunee Harbor lies north of the settlement, and there is a road connection to Menominee, Michigan via the Menekaunee Bridge (or Ogden Street Bridge), a bascule bridge built in 1973.

== Etymology ==
Menekaunee was originally a Menominee Indian village at the mouth of the Menominee River. The name Menekaunee is derived from the Menominee language term Minikani Se'peu 'village (or town) river'. For some time Menekaunee was also known as East Marinette.

== History ==
The first European-American settlers did not come to Menekaunee until 1845, although French-Canadian and American fur traders operated a post near here since the early 19th century.

Unlike Marinette, which went comparatively unscathed the Peshtigo Fire of 1871 (although some buildings were burnt on its western border), Menekaunee was severely damaged by it. About fifty buildings burned down, including an extensive new sawmill, three stores, a flour mill, two hotels, and thirty-five houses. Several scows, nearly a million board feet of lumber, and a number of horses, cows and other animal, were burned. Clouds of burning cinders were driven across the river, and were showered upon the decks of vessels seven miles distant on Green Bay.

== Notable people ==
- Wiram Knowlton, lawyer, judge and member of the Wisconsin Territory Council
- James Larsin, state legislator
