= 7th Connecticut Regiment =

- Active: 1776-1781
- Country: United States
- Allegiance: Connecticut
- Branch: Continental Army
- Type: Infantry
- Part of: Connecticut Line
- Engagements: American Revolutionary War: Battle of Brandywine; Battle of Germantown; Battle of Monmouth

Commanders
- Notable commanders: Colonel Charles Webb; Captain Ebenezer Hills Sr.

The 7th Connecticut Regiment was raised on September 16, 1776, at New Milford, Connecticut. The regiment would see action in the Battle of Brandywine, Battle of Germantown and the Battle of Monmouth. The regiment was merged into the 5th Connecticut Regiment on January 1, 1781, at West Point, New York and disbanded on November 15, 1783.

Fallen American spy Nathan Hale was in the regiment as first lieutenant before he volunteered to spy on the British in New York City.
