= Morrison Mounds =

- U.S. National Register of Historic Places
- Location: Address restricted
- NRHP reference No.: 73000991
- Added to NRHP: June 4, 1973

Morrison Mounds is a historic site north of Battle Lake, Minnesota, United States, consisting of 22 Native American burial mounds, built beginning around 800 B.C. Twenty are conical, one flat-topped and one elongated, all near Otter Tail Lake. The mound group has the oldest radiocarbon date of any in present-day Minnesota. Its construction is similar to others in the area, suggesting they were all built by members of the same tribe over a period of time. Similarities include a central burial pit, covered by logs, and a possibly crematory. It was listed on the National Register of Historic Places in 1973.
