= James H. Knowlton =

American lawyer and politician (1813–1879)

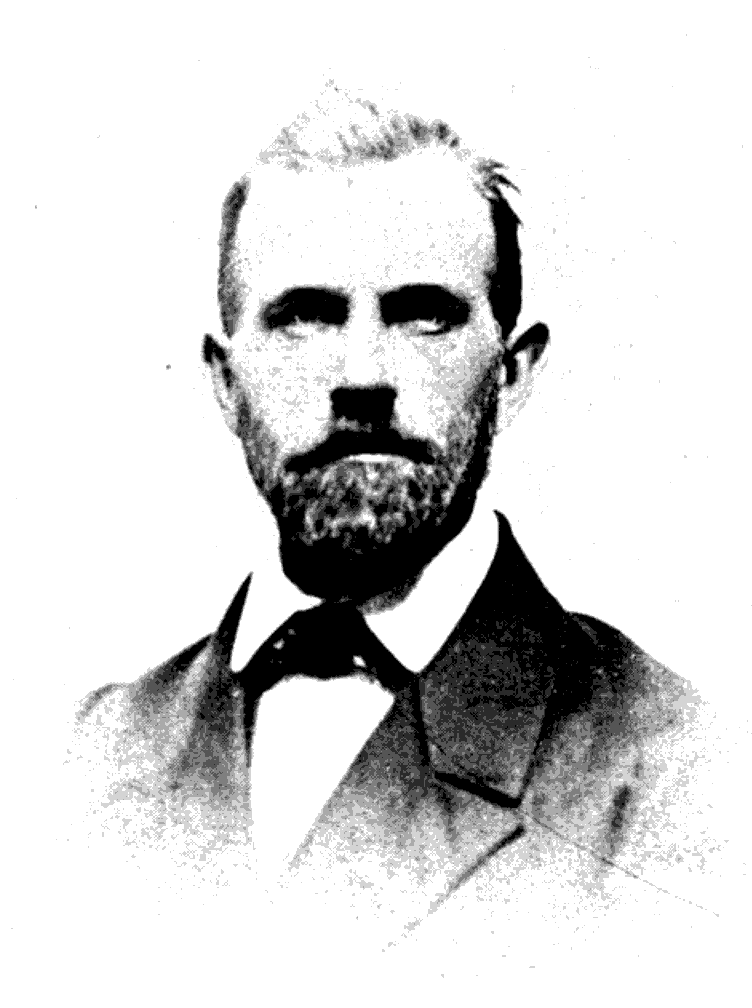

Member of the Wisconsin State Assembly
- In office January 1, 1858 – January 1, 1859
- Preceded by: Ezra A. Foot
- Succeeded by: William E. Wheeler
- Constituency: Rock 3rd district
- In office January 1, 1856 – January 1, 1857
- Preceded by: Joseph White
- Succeeded by: James Earnest
- Constituency: Lafayette 3rd district
- In office January 1, 1854 – January 1, 1855
- Preceded by: Philemon Simpson
- Succeeded by: A. A. Townsend
- Constituency: Lafayette 2nd district

Personal details
- Born: August 22, 1813 Canandaigua, New York
- Died: January 29, 1879 (aged 65) Chicago, Illinois
- Resting place: Evergreen Hill Cemetery, Middleton, Wisconsin
- Party: Republican (after 1854); Democratic (until 1854)
- Spouse: Agnes Flanders (died 1886)
- Relatives: Wiram Knowlton (brother)
- Profession: lawyer, politician

James H. Knowlton (August 22, 1813 – January 29, 1879) was an American politician and lawyer. He served three terms in the Wisconsin State Assembly. His brother, Wiram Knowlton, was a justice of the Wisconsin Supreme Court.

== Early life and career ==
Knowlton was born in Canandaigua, New York, in 1813. His brother and parents moved to the Wisconsin Territory in the 1830s, and he joined them at Janesville in 1838. He was there only briefly before moving to Mineral Point, and in 1847, he moved to Shullsburg, in Lafayette County. At Shullsburg he completed his legal studies, was admitted to the bar, and served as the first probate judge of the county.

== Political career ==
He was a member of the legal team defending Judge Levi Hubbell during his 1853 impeachment, and later that year was elected to the Wisconsin State Assembly as a Democrat. He was not reelected in 1854, but was returned to office again in 1856, this time as a Republican. Following the 1855 election, however, Knowlton became involved in Republican gubernatorial candidate Coles Bashford's legal challenge of the election results. Bashford ultimately prevailed and took office in March 1856.

After the 1856 legislative session, Knowlton moved back to Janesville, in Rock County, where he was elected to his third and final Assembly term in 1857.

Knowlton played a pivotal role in the construction of the old Wisconsin State Capitol, and in keeping the state's seat of government in Madison. In May 1858, the State Assembly debated whether to move the capital to Milwaukee or to construct a new building that would replace the existing capitol in Madison. The proposal to move the capital passed the Assembly, 41–38, with Knowlton's support. However, Knowlton asked that the bill be put to a second vote. The motion to reconsider was passed by one vote. Knowlton and two other members then changed their votes, causing the bill to be defeated.

In 1861, he was a candidate for Wisconsin Supreme Court but was not elected.

== Later years ==
Knowlton moved to Chicago in 1865 and continued his law practice. He lost his entire library in the Great Chicago Fire of 1871.

He died in 1879 after a long period of illness.

== Personal life and family ==
James H. Knowlton was the third of six children born to Ephraim Hiram Baker Knowlton and his wife Anna (née Lepper). The Knowltons were descendants of Captain William Knowlton, who owned a ship by which his family emigrated from England to the Plymouth Colony about 1632.

James Knowlton's younger brother, Wiram Knowlton, was the first Wisconsin circuit court judge in Wisconsin's 6th circuit, and was an ex officio justice of the Wisconsin Supreme Court.
