= Knowlton's Rangers =

- Active: August - November 1776
- Country: United States
- Type: Light infantry
- Size: Company
- Part of: Continental Army
- Engagements: American Revolutionary War: New York and New Jersey campaign; Battle of Harlem Heights; Battle of Fort Washington

Commanders
- Notable commanders: Thomas Knowlton

The "1776" on the United States Army Intelligence Service seal refers to the formation of Knowlton's Rangers

Knowlton's Rangers was an elite light infantry unit's detachment of the Continental Army that specialized in espionage and reconnaissance in dangerous areas. It was established by George Washington in 1776 and was named after its commander, Thomas Knowlton.

== History ==
On August 12, 1776, General of the Army George Washington promoted Knowlton to lieutenant colonel. He was ordered to select a group of 130 men and 20 officers from Connecticut, Rhode Island, and Massachusetts regiments to carry out reconnaissance missions to collect field intelligence in dangerous areas. The American spy, Captain Nathan Hale, of Coventry, Connecticut, was under the command of Lieutenant Colonel Thomas Knowlton. Besides providing tactical intelligence, Knowlton's Rangers, outfitted as a regiment of light infantry, took part in several battles of the American Revolutionary War. That is why Knowlton's Rangers are considered the predecessor to modern special forces units such as Army Rangers, Delta Force, and other special operations units.

== Battle of Harlem Heights ==
On September 16, 1776, Knowlton's Rangers were scouting in advance of Washington's Army at Harlem Heights, New York. While reconnoitering the British outposts they were engaged by elements of the light infantry brigade commanded by Major General Alexander Leslie. The rangers managed a successful retreat and later mounted a counter attack with the support of three companies of Weedon's Regiment led by Major Andrew Leitch. General Washington ordered Knowlton to fall on the enemy's rear, while a feint in front engaged the British troops' attention. The attacking force turned prematurely and made contact with the British right flank instead, losing the element of surprise. In the face of heavy enemy fire, Knowlton rallied his troops to carry on the attack. He fell mortally wounded in front of his men; Leitch was also wounded and died in a few days. Knowlton's loss was lamented by Washington in his general orders for September 17, 1776 with the statement, "The gallant and brave Col Knowlton, ... would have been an Honor to any Country, having fallen yesterday, while gloriously fighting...". Captain Stephen Brown succeeded Knowlton in command of the unit.

== Battle of Fort Washington ==
Knowlton's Rangers were a part of Fort Washington's garrison, defending the last stronghold of the Continental Army in Manhattan. On November 16, 1776, yielding to prevailing force, American troops surrendered and were taken as prisoners of war.

== Legacy ==
Knowlton's Rangers are considered the United States of America's first organized intelligence service organization, as well as the first American Ranger unit formed after America declared its independence from the United Kingdom. The date "1776" on the modern U.S. Army's intelligence service seal refers to the formation of Knowlton's Rangers.

The Order of Knowlton's Rangers at the Pennsylvania State University raises awareness about history and traditions of the unit.

== See also ==
- Francis Marion
- List of American Revolutionary War battles
- List of George Washington articles
