= Battle of Harlem Heights =

1776 battle of the American Revolutionary War

- Part of the New York and New Jersey campaign
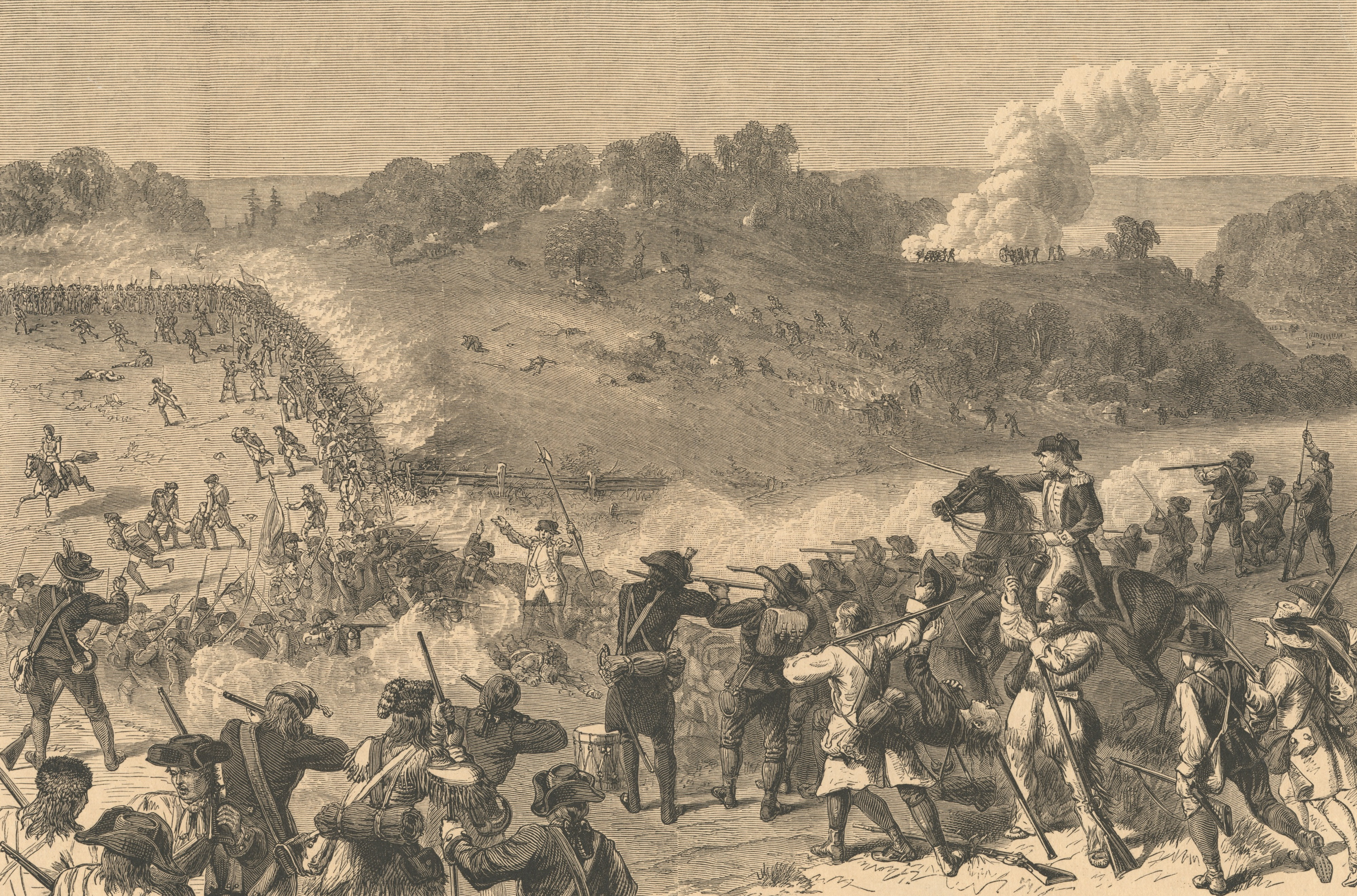
- Illustration of the battle
Date	September 16, 1776
Location	Morningside Heights, Manhattan, New York 40°48′43″N 73°57′49″W
Result	American victory

Belligerents
United States	Great Britain

Commanders and leaders
George Washington; Thomas Knowlton †; Nathanael Greene	Alexander Leslie; William Howe

Strength
<1,800	<1,600

Casualties and losses
30 killed; 100 wounded	14 killed; 157 wounded

The Battle of Harlem Heights was fought on September 16, 1776, in the Harlem Heights, Manhattan, during the New York and New Jersey campaign of the American Revolutionary War. A force of just under 1,800 American troops under General George Washington engaged a force of just under 1,600 British troops under Brigadier-general Alexander Leslie.

An early morning skirmish between a patrol of Knowlton's Rangers and pickets of Leslie's light infantry brigade developed into a running fight as the British pursued the Americans back through woods towards Washington's position on the Harlem Heights. The overconfident British light infantry advanced too far from their lines without support and exposed themselves to an American counterattack. Seeing this, Washington ordered a flanking maneuver which failed to cut off the British force but, in the face of this attack and facing pressure from American troops arriving from Harlem Heights, the outnumbered British retreated.

Meeting reinforcements coming from the south and with the added support of a pair of field guns, the British light infantry turned and made a stand in open fields at the Harlem Heights. The Americans, also reinforced, came on in strength and there followed a lengthy exchange of fire. After two hours, with ammunition running short, the British force began to pull back to their lines. Washington cut short the pursuit, unwilling to risk a general engagement with the British main force, and withdrew to his own lines. The battle helped restore the confidence of American troops after they had suffered several defeats. It was Washington's first battlefield success of the war.

After a month without any major fighting between the armies, Washington was forced to withdraw his army north to the town of White Plains, New York when the British moved west into Westchester County and threatened to flank Washington further south on Manhattan. After two defeats Washington retreated west across the Hudson River.

== Background ==
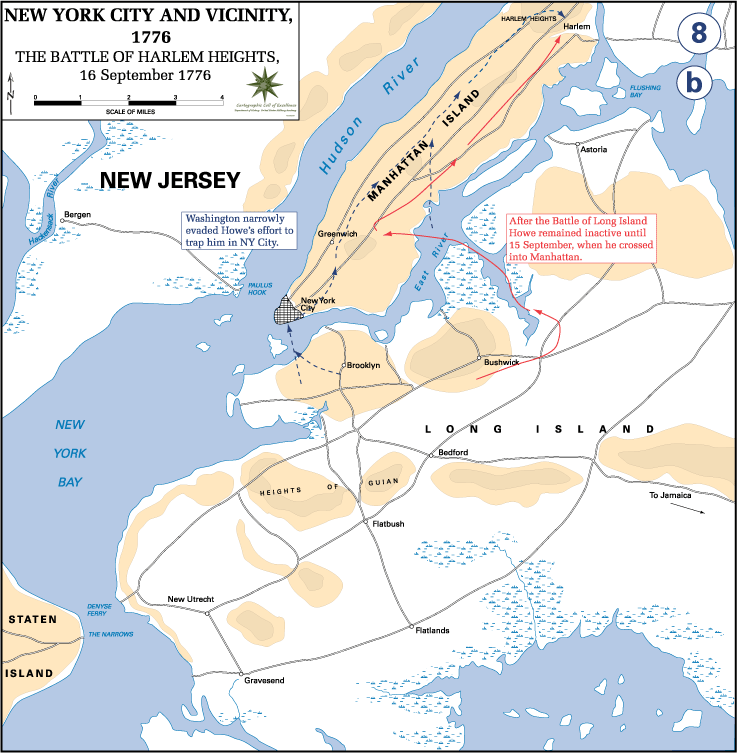
Map of the battle's background

On August 27, 1776, British troops under the command of General William Howe flanked and defeated the American army at the Battle of Brooklyn. Howe moved his forces and pinned the Americans down at Brooklyn Heights, with the East River to the American rear. On the night of August 29, General George Washington, Commander-in-Chief of the Continental Army, evacuated his entire army of 9,000 men and their equipment across the water to Manhattan.

On September 15, Howe landed his army in an amphibious operation at Kip's Bay, on the eastern shore of Manhattan, along the East River. After a bombardment of the American positions on the shore, 4,000 British and Hessian troops began to disembark. The American troops began to flee at the sight of the enemy, and even after Washington arrived on the scene and took immediate command, demanding that his soldiers stand and fight, they refused to obey orders and continued to flee.

After scattering the Americans at Kip's Bay, Howe landed 9,000 more troops, but did not immediately cut off the American retreat from New York Town in the south of the island. Washington had all of his troops in the city on their way to north along the west side of Manhattan to Harlem Heights by 4:00 pm and they all reached the fortifications on the Heights by nightfall.

== Battle ==
Early on September 16, Washington received reports, which proved to be unfounded, that the British were advancing. Washington, who had been expecting an attack, had ordered a party of 150 men under the command of Lieutenant Colonel Thomas Knowlton to reconnoiter the British lines. At daybreak, Knowlton's troops were spotted by British pickets from the light infantry brigade under Brigadier-general Alexander Leslie. Two or three companies of the 2nd Light Infantry Battalion advanced to attack the Americans to their front. For more than half an hour the skirmish continued, in the woods spanning two farm properties, Jones' and Hoaglandt's. When Knowlton realized that the numerically superior British forces were about to turn his flank, he ordered a retreat, which was conducted "without confusion or loss", although perhaps ten men had been lost in the initial skirmish.

The British followed in rapid pursuit. Knowlton's party emerged into the open on the edge of the woods overlooking a wide re-entrant known as the Hollow Way, which marked the forward edge of Washington's position. The rangers crossed into the American lines while the pursuing light infantry, on reaching the tree line, paused to reorganize. The sound of their bugle calls, whether calling the skirmishers to regroup or calling for reinforcements, to Washington's Adjutant General Colonel Joseph Reed were reminiscent of a fox hunt, and seemed to him to be intended as an insult. Probably about this time, elements of the 2nd and 3rd Light Infantry Battalions, along with the 42nd Highlanders were ordered up as reinforcements. Reed, who had gone forward to confer with Knowlton, rode back to brief Washington and encouraged him to reinforce the rangers. Washington, seeing an opportunity to revive the spirits of his men, devised a plan to entrap the unwary enemy patrol. He ordered troops forward to make a diversionary attack, in order to draw the British down into the Hollow Way, while another detachment moved around the British right flank to cut them off.

Map of the battle

The diversionary party, composed of 150 volunteers, ran into the Hollow Way and began to engage the British, who responded by advancing down into the valley to occupy a wooded fence line and returned fire. The volunteers were then reinforced by a further 900 men and a prolonged exchange of fire ensued, although the two sides were too far apart to do much damage. The flanking party consisted of Knowlton's Rangers, reinforced by three companies of Virginia riflemen commanded by Major Andrew Leitch, in total about 200 men. As they moved forward, it seems an unidentified officer accidentally misdirected the group, and the manoeuvre caught the British in the flank, not their rear. During the attack, both Knowlton and Leitch were shot and fatally injured. Despite this, the American troops pushed on.

The British troops, realizing that their flank was in danger, retreated uphill to occupy a fence-line. Washington reinforced his troops in the Hollow Way and together with the flanking party mounted a frontal attack. The British light infantry retired across open farmland to a buckwheat field in the area where Barnard College now stands. Here they received reinforcements; including a pair of 3-pdr guns. Washington was originally reluctant to pursue the British troops, but after seeing that his men were slowly pushing the British back, he sent in reinforcements and permitted the troops to engage in a direct attack. By the time that all of the reinforcements arrived, nearly 1,800 Americans were engaged in the buckwheat field. To direct the battle, members of Washington's staff, including Nathanael Greene, were sent in. By this time, the British troops had also been reinforced; bringing their strength up to a number slightly less than the attacking Americans.

For an hour and a half, the battle continued in the field and in the surrounding woods until, with some units, including the 3-pdrs, having fired away their ammunition, the British began to withdraw. The Americans pressed forward in pursuit until Washington, concerned about the approach of British reserves, ordered a halt. Upon receiving Washington's orders to return to their lines, the troops gave a loud "huzzah" and left the field in good order.

== Aftermath ==
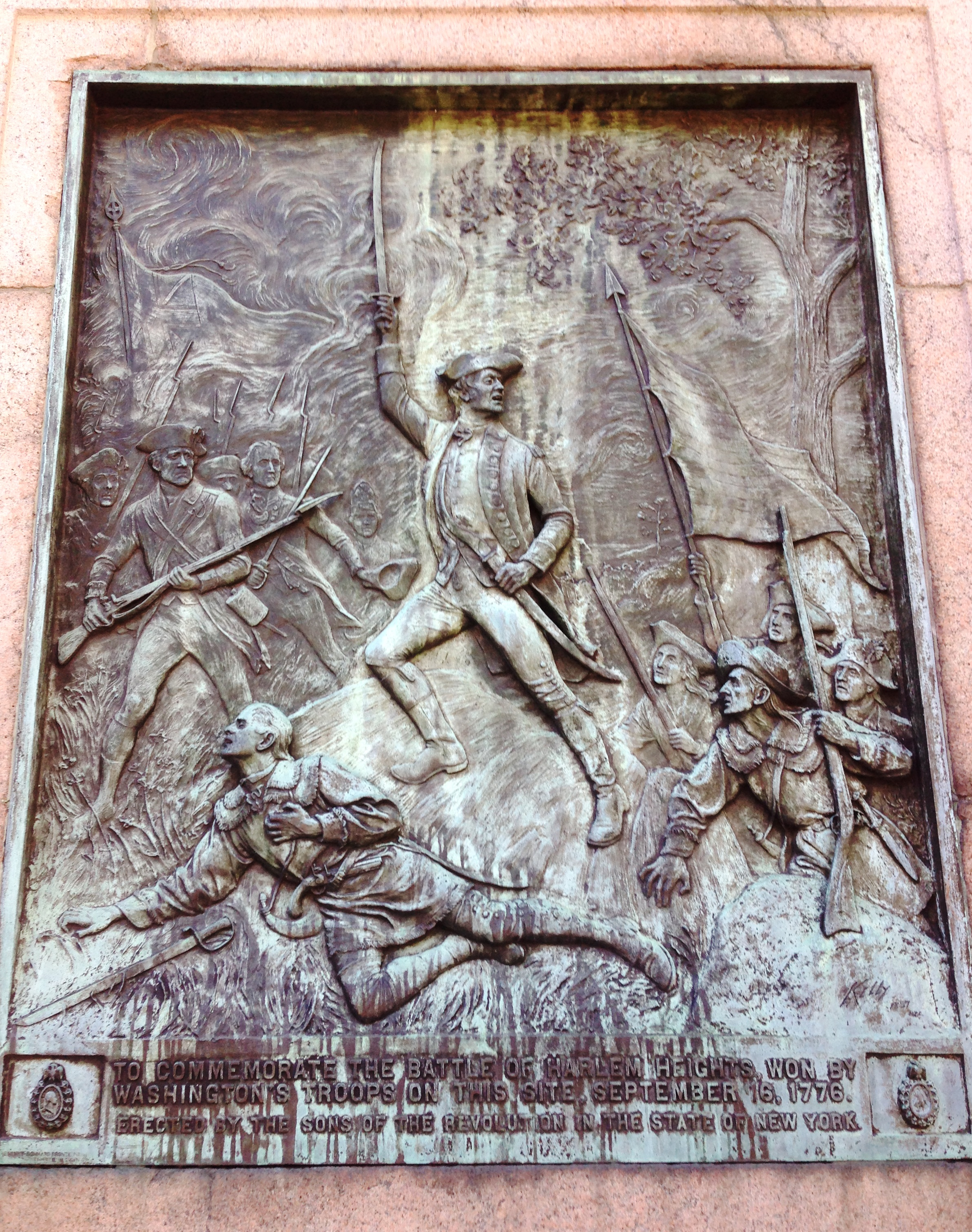
A plaque honoring the death of Colonel Knowlton, on the Mathematics Building at the Morningside Heights campus of Columbia University, near the spot where he fell.

The British casualties were officially reported by Howe at 14 killed and 78 wounded, but a member of Howe's staff wrote in his diary that the loss was 14 killed and 154 wounded. The author David McCullough suggests much higher figures of "probably...90 killed and about 300 wounded" but cites no source for this. Henry Johnston, whose 1897 study remains the only detailed investigation of the battle, assessed British losses at 14 killed and 157 wounded and those of the Americans at about 30 killed and 100 wounded, including Colonel Knowlton among the dead.

Major Andrew Leitch, commander of the Virginia riflemen, died some days later. Both sides claimed victory. The repulse of British troops in this "pretty sharp skirmish" boosted morale in the American ranks "prodigiously", as George Washington observed, even among those who had not been engaged. It also marked the first success of the war for the army directly under Washington's command.

After the battle, Washington received word that the British were moving by sea to the north and landing at Throg's Neck. Concerned that the British would attempt to outflank him and trap him in New York, Washington began a strategic retreat north. To check the British advance, reinforcements from Massachusetts were sent to Eastchester to monitor the British movement. Unable to cross by land from Throgs Neck, the British landed at Pell's Point where a battle commenced on October 18, delaying the British and giving Washington time to move his army to White Plains. After being defeated at the Battle of White Plains and later at Fort Washington, Washington and his army retreated across New Jersey, pursued by the British, into Pennsylvania.

The loss of Knowlton was a blow to the fledgling American intelligence operations, as he had created and led the first such unit of the Continental Army, at the direction of Washington.

== See also ==
- List of American Revolutionary War battles
- American Revolutionary War § British New York counter-offensive. The 'Battle of Harlem Heights' placed in overall sequence and strategic context.
- List of George Washington articles
