= W.H.C. Folsom =

American politician (1817–1900)

- Folsom c. 1858

Personal details
- Born: William Henry Carman Folsom; June 22, 1817 New Brunswick, Canada
- Died: December 17, 1900 (aged 83) Taylors Falls, Minnesota
- Spouse(s): Mary Jane Folsom, née Wyman
- Children: Wyman X. Folsom and Frank W. Folsom

William Henry Carman Folsom (June 22, 1817 – December 17, 1900) was a businessman and politician in Minnesota. Born in New Brunswick, Canada, he later emigrated to the United States and settled in Maine. He moved west to Minnesota in the 1840s and settled near Taylors Falls, Minnesota in 1850.

Folsom became involved in the lumber business in what would become the Minnesota Territory and began investing in businesses and real estate in Minnesota and Wisconsin. He was also an active historian and writer, publishing several articles and a book, Fifty Years in the Northwest, which was published by the St. Paul Pioneer Press Company in 1888.

Folsom was also involved in state's early political development, attending the Republican constitutional convention in 1857 and serving four different terms in the Minnesota House of Representatives and Minnesota State Senate between 1857 and 1877. He was credited as helping organize the first district court in the state and was also part of the committee which developed the first official Seal of Minnesota in 1858.

Folsom died in 1900. His home in Taylors Falls, Folsom House, is maintained as a historic site by a local chapter of the Minnesota Historical Society. Another former property of his, W.H.C. Folsom House in Prairie du Chien, Wisconsin, is listed on the National Register of Historic Places.

== Publications ==
- Fifty Years in the Northwest (1888)
