= Thomas Knowlton =

American patriot (1740–1776)

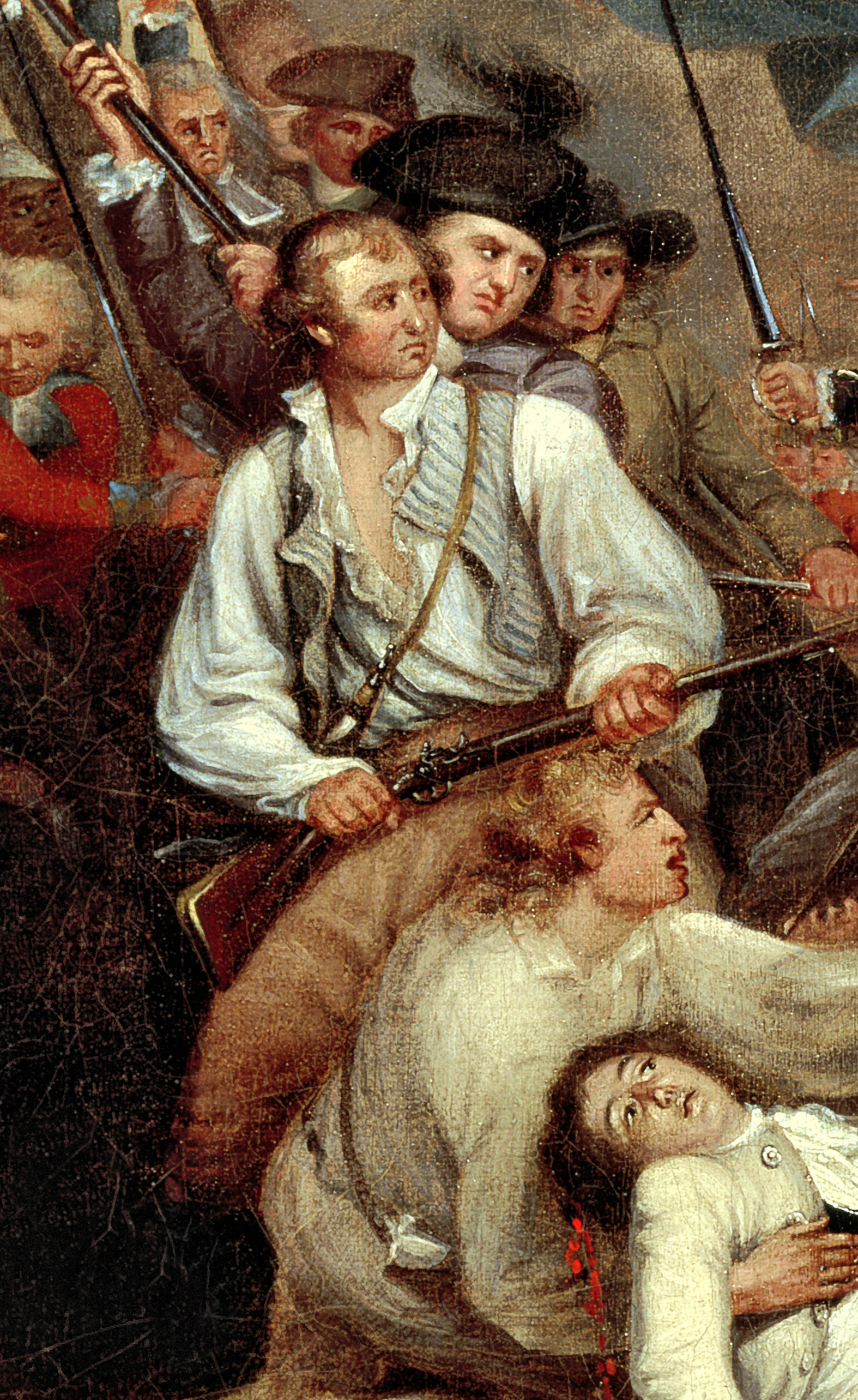
- Detail from The Death of General Warren at the Battle of Bunker's Hill, June 17, 1775 (1786) depicting Knowlton
- Born: November 22, 1740; West Boxford, Province of Massachusetts Bay, British America
- Died: 16 September 1776 (aged 35); New York City, US
- Cause of death: Killed in action
- Other names: Father of American Military Intelligence Connecticut's Forgotten Hero The Gallant and Brave Fearless Ranger
- Occupations: Farmer and soldier
- Spouse: Anna Keyes (m. 1759–1776)
- Children: 3 sons, 6 daughters
- Espionage activity
- Allegiance: United States
- Service years: French and Indian War (1755–1762) American Revolutionary War (1775–1776)
- Rank: Lieutenant Colonel
- Military career
- Conflicts: American Revolutionary War; Massachusetts campaign; Siege of Boston; Battle of Bunker Hill; New York and New Jersey campaign; Battle of Harlem Heights †

Thomas W. Knowlton (November 22, 1740 – September 16, 1776) was an American patriot who served in the French and Indian War and was a lieutenant colonel during the American Revolution. Knowlton is considered America's first Intelligence professional, and his unit, Knowlton's Rangers, gathered intelligence during the early Revolutionary War. Knowlton was killed in action at the Battle of Harlem Heights.

== Early life and education ==
Knowlton was born into a military family on November 22, 1740. His family were among the earliest English settlers in the Massachusetts colony. When he was eight, his family relocated to a farm in Ashford, Connecticut (current property of the June Norcross Webster Scout Reservation). In 1755, at fifteen, Knowlton served in the French and Indian War with his older brother Daniel Knowlton. He enlisted in Captain John Durkee's company, and is known to have joined Daniel on scouting missions into enemy territory. He later served in Captain John Slapp's 8th Company, where he served with Throope Chapman.

He served during six campaigns in the war and was promoted to lieutenant in 1760.

In 1762, he fought in Israel Putnam's company against the Spanish during the British expedition against Cuba or the Siege of Havana.

By August 1762, Knowlton had returned home.

== Battle of Bunker Hill ==
On April 18, 1775, General Thomas Gage dispatched a contingent of British troops to Lexington and Concord, about fifteen miles from Boston, Massachusetts. This action led to the outbreak of hostilities that became the American Revolution. On learning of the Battles of Lexington and Concord, the militias of Massachusetts, Connecticut and New Hampshire communities mobilized their members. Thomas Knowlton joined his militia, the Ashford Company, which became part of the 5th Connecticut Regiment, along with the men from Windham, Mansfield and Coventry, Connecticut. Knowlton was chosen unanimously as captain and led 200 men into Massachusetts. His force consisted of farmers, without uniforms, primarily armed with shotguns.

Knowlton was ordered to Charlestown to join Colonel William Prescott. Knowlton's troops were sent by Colonel Prescott to oppose the advancing British grenadiers, and took their posts on the side of Breed's hill. Knowlton was in command of a 200 men work party. His men dismantled another fence further back and used its rails to strengthen the existing fence, and they filled the space between with new-mown grass which formed an effective breastwork. There they held their ground until the general retreat, and were among those providing cover as the troops retreated. Only three men from Knowlton's company died in the battle.

In 1776, Knowlton was sent by General Washington during the Siege of Boston to burn any remaining buildings at the base of Bunker Hill, with orders to capture any British troops guarding the location. Knowlton accomplished his mission without firing a shot or losing a single man.

Years later, Colonel Aaron Burr said: "I had a full account of the Battle from Knowlton's own lips, and I believe if the chief command had been entrusted to him, the issue would have proved more fortunate. It was impossible to promote such a man too rapidly." In June 1775, for his bravery at Bunker Hill, Knowlton was promoted by Congress to major. One of his men later remembered that Knowlton was very courageous, never crying, Go on, boys! but always, Come on, boys!. On January 8, 1776, he led a troop in a successful incursion into Charlestown to burn housing used by British officers.

== Knowlton's Rangers ==
Seal of the United States Army Military Intelligence Corps

On August 12, 1776, General of the Army George Washington promoted Knowlton to lieutenant colonel. He was ordered to select a group of men from Connecticut, Rhode Island, and Massachusetts to carry out reconnaissance missions. America's first official spies, "Knowlton's Rangers" were also the first organized American elite troops. The American spy, Captain Nathan Hale, was under the command of Knowlton. The date "1776" on the modern U.S. Army's intelligence service seal refers to the formation of Knowlton's Rangers. Knowlton was personally responsible for recruiting Nathan Hale into the Rangers. After Washington requested a volunteer for a dangerous espionage mission behind enemy lines in Long Island, Knowlton presented the opportunity to his officers, and Hale was the only one to step forward.

== Battle of Harlem Heights and death of Knowlton ==
On September 16, 1776, a company of rangers led by Knowlton was scouting in advance of Washington's army at the Battle of Harlem Heights. While reconnoitering the British outposts they were engaged by elements of the light infantry brigade commanded by Major General Alexander Leslie. They managed a successful retreat and later mounted a counter-attack with the support of riflemen led by Major Andrew Leitch of Virginia. General Washington ordered the units to fall on the enemy's rear, while a feint in front engaged the British troops’ attention. Knowlton's force turned prematurely and made contact with the right flank of the British instead, losing the element of surprise. In the face of heavy fire from the British, Knowlton rallied his troops to carry on the attack. Both American commanding officers fell mortally wounded in front of their men.

During the battle, Knowlton was struck by a British musket ball in the small of his back or in the back of his head while leading a flanking maneuver against the Black Watch (42nd Royal Highland Regiment). As he lay dying, he reportedly told his son, who was also fighting in the battle: "You see, my son, I am mortally wounded; you can do me no good; go fight for your country". As he lay mortally wounded, Knowlton's primary concern remained the outcome of the engagement. He reportedly asked those attending him if the Continental troops had "drove the enemy," and famously stated to Adjutant General Joseph Reed while in his arms:

I do not value my life if we do but get the day.

— Thomas Knowlton, September 16, 1776 Reed, William B. (1847). Life and Correspondence of Joseph Reed. Vol. 1. Philadelphia: Lindsay and Blakiston. pp. 237–238.

The following day, September 17, General Washington issued General Orders that formally credited Knowlton's bravery, stating, "The gallant and brave Col. Knowlton... would have been an Honor to any Country, having fallen yesterday, while gloriously fighting."Washington, George (September 17, 1776). "General Orders, 17 September 1776". Founders Online. National Archives.

== Personal life and family ==
On April 5, 1759, he returned to Ashford to marry Anna Keyes (b. September 1, 1743), he was around 18 and she was 15 at the time.

In 1760, he had his first son, Frederick Knowlton. In total, they had 9 children including Salley (b. 1763), Thomas Jr. (b. 1765), Polly (b. 1767), Abigail (b. 1768), Sampson (b. 1770 – d. 1777), Anna Jr. (b. 1771 – d. 1772), Anna Jr. (b. 1773), and Lucinda (b. 1776).

At the age of thirty-three, Knowlton was appointed a Selectman of Ashford, Connecticut.

== Legacy and honors ==
Knowlton is recognized as a foundational figure in American history, serving as the "Father of American Military Intelligence." The modern Military Intelligence Corps traces its lineage directly to Knowlton's Rangers, and the official corps seal features the year "1776" in specific honor of the unit’s formation.

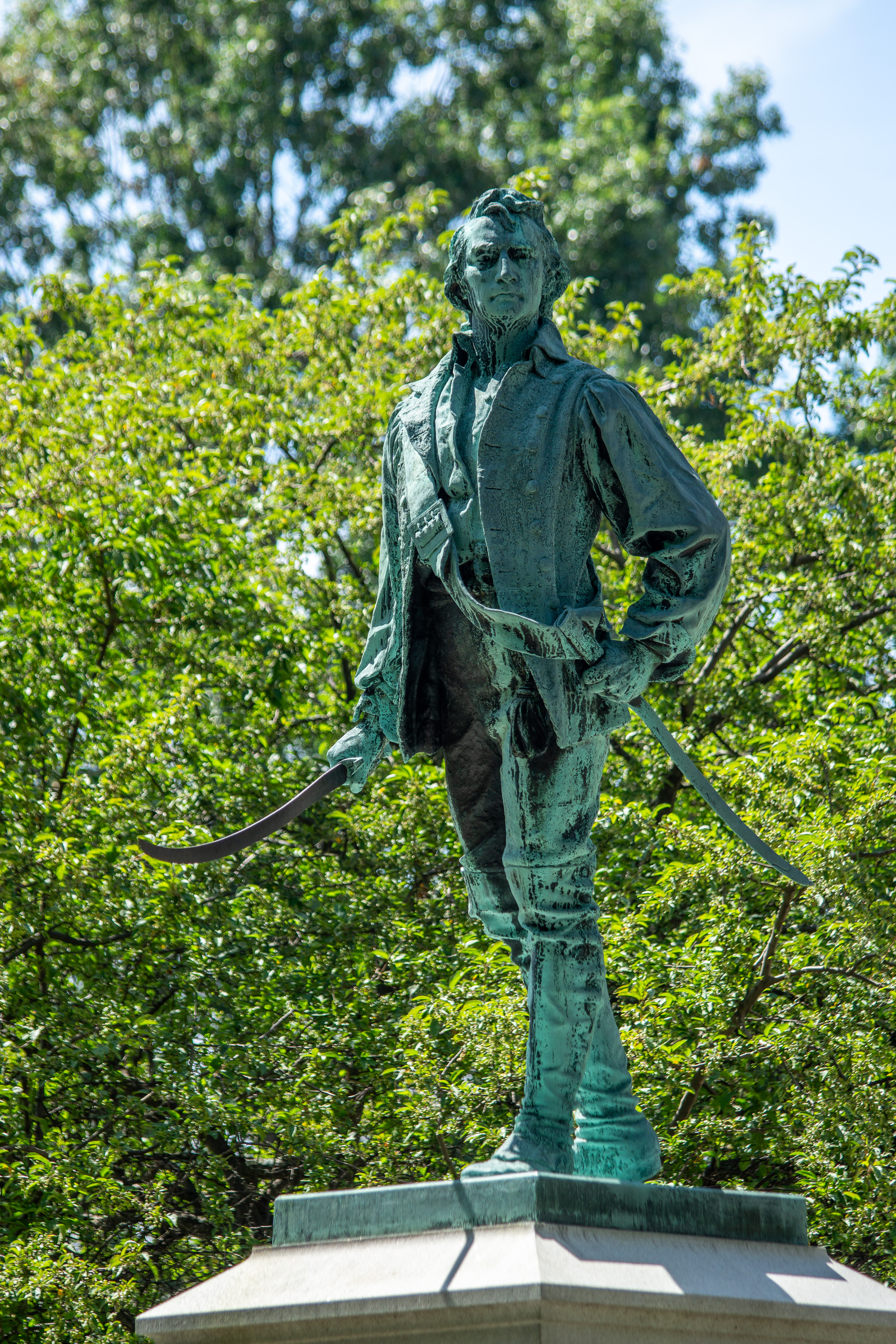
Statue of Knowlton in Hartford, Connecticut

In 1895, a bronze statue of Knowlton was dedicated on the grounds of the Connecticut State Capitol in Hartford. In Ashford, his service is preserved through the Knowlton Memorial Hall, which houses the Babcock Library and town offices. Knowlton was posthumously inducted into the Military Intelligence Hall of Fame in 1996.

== Knowlton Award ==
Coat of Arms of Thomas Knowlton

In 1995 the Military Intelligence Corps Association (MICA) established the LTC Thomas W. Knowlton Award to honor his role as "Father of Military Intelligence". The Knowlton Award recognizes individuals who have contributed significantly to the promotion of Army Military Intelligence in ways that stand out in the eyes of the recipients, their superiors, subordinates and peers. It is considered a "once in a lifetime" honor to intelligence professionals as these individuals must also demonstrate the highest standards of integrity and moral character, display an outstanding degree of professional competence, and serve the MI Corps with distinction.

Recipients include Marian Rejewski, the mathematician and cryptologist at the Polish General Staff's Cipher Bureau who in late 1932 reconstructed the German military Enigma cipher machine, and Albert Stubblebine.
