= Wiram Knowlton =

American judge (1816–1863)

The Honorable Wiram Knowlton

Justice of the Wisconsin Supreme Court
- ex officio
- In office August 1850 – June 1, 1853

Wisconsin Circuit Court Judge for the 6th Circuit
- In office August 1850 – August 6, 1856
- Preceded by: Position Established
- Succeeded by: George Gale

Member of the Council of the Wisconsin Territory for Crawford and St. Croix counties
- In office January 6, 1845 – January 4, 1847
- Preceded by: Theophilus La Chappelle
- Succeeded by: Benjamin F. Manahan

Personal details
- Born: January 24, 1816 Canandaigua, New York, U.S.
- Died: June 27, 1863 (aged 47) Menekaunee, Wisconsin, U.S.
- Resting place: Evergreen Cemetery; Prairie du Chien, Wisconsin
- Spouse: Candace Atwood (m. 1842; died 1847)
- Relatives: James H. Knowlton (brother)
- Occupation: lawyer, judge

Military service
- Allegiance: United States
- Branch/service: United States Volunteers
- Years of service: 1846–1848
- Rank: Captain, USV
- Battles/wars: Mexican–American War

Wiram Knowlton (January 24, 1816 – June 27, 1863) was an American lawyer, jurist, and Wisconsin pioneer. He was one of the first six Wisconsin circuit court judges, his circuit being the vast, lightly-populated western quarter of the new state; he served from 1850 to 1856. As a circuit court judge in this era, he was an ex officio justice of the Wisconsin Supreme Court (the Wisconsin Supreme Court before 1853 was composed of the state's elected circuit court judges).

His elder brother James H. Knowlton was also a Wisconsin pioneer politician, lawyer, and judge.

== Biography ==
Born in Canandaigua, New York, Knowlton moved to Janesville, Wisconsin Territory, in 1837 and began to study law. He was admitted to the bar in 1840 and started a law practice in Prairie du Chien, where he was also elected to the Wisconsin Territorial Council (upper house of the Territorial Legislature) from 1845 to 1847.

During the Mexican–American War, he raised a company of men using the W.H.C. Folsom House. He was elected captain of the company and they were stationed at Fort Winnebago for frontier duty, freeing up the regular garrison to be redeployed to the south. In July 1850, he was elected Wisconsin Circuit Court judge for the newly created 6th circuit and sworn into office in August. Because of this office, he also served as a justice of the Wisconsin Supreme Court, which at the time was composed of Wisconsin's circuit court judges. This changed in 1853, when a separate supreme court was created by an act of the Wisconsin Legislature. Knowlton died in Menekaunee, Wisconsin.

== Personal life and family ==
Wiram Knowlton was the fourth of six children born to Ephraim Hiram Baker Knowlton and his wife Anna (née Lepper). The Knowltons were descendants of Captain William Knowlton, who owned a ship by which his family emigrated from England to the Plymouth Colony about 1632.

Wiram Knowlton's elder brother, James H. Knowlton, was a member of the Wisconsin State Assembly and an early probate judge in Lafayette County, Wisconsin.

== Electoral history ==
=== Wisconsin Supreme Court (1852) ===
Wisconsin Supreme Court Election, 1852
Party	Candidate	Votes	%	±%
General Election, September 1852
Democratic	Samuel Crawford	10,520	53.48%	
Independent	Wiram Knowlton	9,151	46.52%	
Plurality		1,369	6.96%	
Total votes		19,671	100.0%	
Democratic win (new seat)				

Legal offices
New circuit	Wisconsin Circuit Court Judge for the 6th Circuit; August 1850 – August 6, 1856	Succeeded by George Gale
