= The Karate Kid (video game) =

1987 video game

- Box art featuring
- Developer: Atlus
- Publisher: LJN
- Programmers: Hideo Kuwamura; Kaoru Ogura
- Composers: Tsukasa Masuko; Hirohiko Takayama
- Series: The Karate Kid
- Platform: Nintendo Entertainment System
- Release: NA: November 1987
- Genre: Action
- Modes: Single-player, multiplayer

The Karate Kid is a 1987 licensed action game developed by Atlus and published by LJN for the Nintendo Entertainment System (NES) exclusively in North America despite being developed by a Japanese developer. It is based on The Karate Kid Part II (1986) and follows the player, as the karate student Danial LaRusso, progressing through four levels loosely based on events from the film. The gameplay is split between traversing through side-scrolling areas and fighting opponents one on one; the latter of which can be played separately with a second player.

== Gameplay ==
The Karate Kid is an action game based loosely on events from the 1986 martial arts drama film The Karate Kid Part II. The player controls karate student Danial LaRusso through four levels:

=== Level 1 ===
The game begins with Daniel LaRusso fighting in the All Valley Karate Tournament (the location for the first Karate Kid film's climax). He will have to go through four fighters in order to advance to the next stage. The opponent's energy bar increases as the player progresses through them. The final fight is presumably with Johnny Lawrence from the film.

=== Level 2 ===
Daniel then starts the second level which is set in Okinawa (the primary setting for The Karate Kid Part II). There, he must dispatch random thugs who die in one hit while progressing to Chozen at the end of the stage. For every few enemies dispatched, Daniel can collect large "C" and "D" symbols that allow him to use Crane Kicks and Drum Punches, respectively. They also replenish a low amount of Daniel's energy meter. There are also a few obvious and not-so-obvious entrances where Daniel can earn Drum Punches and Crane Kicks by either breaking ice-blocks, catching flies with chopsticks, or dodging a swinging hammer.

=== Level 3 ===
In the third stage of play, Daniel is in a stage that is nearly identical to the second (with some tricky jumps) during a typhoon. The typhoon causes a strong wind to interfere with the player's jumps and various objects (sticks, birds) to fly through the air and threaten the player's energy. They can be hit for extra points, however. The boss is Chozen Toguchi again and this time, there is a girl up on a pole that Daniel must save. It is not necessary to beat Chozen, only rescue the girl.

=== Level 4 ===
The final stage is the festival after the typhoon. Daniel wears a new outfit for this stage and the random enemies are now tougher, requiring two hits to be felled. There are also enemies with spears who take even more hits to defeat. The final boss, once again Chozen, has a new twist. Now he has Kumiko down on the ground beside him and if Daniel does not occasionally come into contact with her, she will slip off the platform and drown. This will result in a lost life. If Daniel can defeat the boss without Kumiko drowning the player will be treated to a brief ending. An image of Mr. Miyagi's head appears and is animated to look as if he's talking and saying: "You have successfully guided Daniel-san through all the challenges and have become a martial arts master!" Upon saying this, Miyagi then winks to the player.
