= The Karate Kid Part III =

1989 American martial arts drama film

- Theatrical release poster
- Directed by: John G. Avildsen
- Written by: Robert Mark Kamen
- Based on: Characters created by Robert Mark Kamen
- Produced by: Jerry Weintraub
- Starring: Ralph Macchio; Noriyuki "Pat" Morita
- Cinematography: Steve Yaconelli
- Edited by: John G. Avildsen; John Carter
- Music by: Bill Conti
- Production company: Columbia Pictures
- Distributed by: Columbia Pictures
- Release date: June 30, 1989 (U.S.)
- Running time: 111 minutes
- Country: United States
- Language: English
- Budget: $12.5 million
- Box office: $38.9 million

The Karate Kid Part III is a 1989 American martial arts drama film directed by John G. Avildsen and written by Robert Mark Kamen. It is the third entry in The Karate Kid franchise and a sequel to The Karate Kid Part II (1986). The film stars Ralph Macchio, Pat Morita, Robyn Lively and Thomas Ian Griffith in his film debut. The story follows John Kreese, with the help of his former army friend Terry Silver, as he attempts to gain revenge on Daniel LaRusso and Mr. Miyagi, which involves recruiting ruthless martial artist Mike Barnes and harming their relationship.

Following the release of the second film, Kamen wanted to make a prequel to the franchise. However, the producers refused and mandated a story more similar to the original film. As was the case with the first two films, the stunts were choreographed by Pat E. Johnson and the music was composed by Bill Conti.

The Karate Kid Part III was released by Columbia Pictures on June 30, 1989. The film received generally negative reviews from critics, with criticism aimed at its rehashing of elements found in the first film, though Griffith's performance as Silver received some praise. Though moderately successful at the box office, grossing $38.9 million on a $12.5 million budget, it marked a sharp decline from the $130 million earned by both of its predecessors respectively. It was followed by The Next Karate Kid in 1994, with Morita reprising his role as Mr. Miyagi. The film's storylines are continued in the sequel television series, Cobra Kai (2018–2025).

== Plot ==
After being abandoned by his students, (Note: As depicted in The Karate Kid Part II (1986)) a now-broke-and-destitute John Kreese visits Terry Silver, a fellow Green Beret who has become a toxic-chemical magnate. Silver vows to personally help him re-establish Cobra Kai, while getting revenge on Daniel LaRusso and Mr. Miyagi for defeating his dojo in the 1984 All-Valley Karate Tournament. (Note: As depicted in The Karate Kid (1984)) After sending Kreese to Tahiti for a vacation, Silver hires national karate champion Mike Barnes — known for his vicious personality and utter lack of sportsmanship — to challenge Daniel at the next All-Valley Tournament.

Returning to Los Angeles from Okinawa, Daniel and Miyagi discover that the South Seas apartment complex has been sold and demolished; this leaves Miyagi unemployed and Daniel homeless. With Daniel's mother Lucille nursing his ailing uncle Louie back in New Jersey, Daniel moves in with Miyagi.

Daniel uses his college funds to finance a bonsai shop for Miyagi, who gratefully makes him a partner in the business. Visiting a pottery store across the street, Daniel befriends the sole employee: Jessica Andrews, whose aunt Pat owns the store. Jessica agrees to a date that same night, during which he learns that she's visiting from Columbus, Ohio, where she already has a boyfriend. She and Daniel remain cordial.

While Miyagi introduces Daniel to kata training, Silver makes himself known to them both, mentioning that he and Kreese were stationed together in South Korea during the Vietnam War. Silver announces that Kreese has died, and apologizes on his behalf. Accompanied by Silver's goons Dennis and Snake, Barnes harasses Daniel and Jessica by forcing him to sign up for the All-Valley, which he continuously refuses. The henchmen wreck Miyagi's shop and steal his entire stock of bonsai trees, leaving an All-Valley tournament application hanging in its place. Daniel decides to dig up and sell a valuable bonsai, which Miyagi brought from Okinawa, in order to replace the missing trees. Abruptly, Barnes appears and forces Daniel to sign up for the tournament by trapping him and Jessica at the bottom of a cliff, while also damaging the bonsai. Daniel accepts Silver's offer to train him for the All-Valley, after Miyagi refuses to do so on principle.

At the Cobra Kai dojo, Daniel is subjected to a brutal training regimen which takes a massive physical and emotional toll on him while further alienating him from Miyagi. This culminates in a now-aggressive Daniel abusing Miyagi and attacking a stranger, who was bribed by Silver to provoke Daniel by making advances on Jessica at a dance club. Disturbed by his own actions, Daniel makes amends with Jessica as she's preparing to go home. She encourages him to patch things up with Miyagi, which he does. While lamenting over forgetting all of Miyagi's lessons, Daniel learns the bonsai that Barnes damaged has begun to bud and heal.

Returning to the Cobra Kai dojo, Daniel informs Silver that he's changed his mind about competing in the All-Valley. Silver angrily discards his ruse, reveals his agenda and brings out Barnes to attack Daniel, whose escape is blocked by Kreese. Just then, Miyagi arrives; after effortlessly defeating Barnes, Kreese, and Silver, he agrees to train Daniel for the All-Valley Tournament.

At the tournament, Silver announces his plan to re-establish Cobra Kai as a business franchise. In the final match, Silver has Barnes torture Daniel by alternately scoring points and losing them via illegal strikes. The match ends in a draw, necessitating sudden death overtime. Severely pummeled, Daniel wants to quit until Miyagi insists that Daniel's best karate is still inside him. Daniel perseveres and performs the kata, thus scoring on Barnes to win the All-Valley and foil Silver's revival of Cobra Kai. (Note: In the first season of Cobra Kai it is revealed that the actions of Cobra Kai in the All-Valley Tournament earned the dojo a lifetime ban from participating in future tournaments.)

== Cast ==
- Ralph Macchio as Daniel LaRusso
- Noriyuki "Pat" Morita as Mr. Miyagi
- Thomas Ian Griffith as Terry Silver
- Robyn Lively as Jessica Andrews
- Sean Kanan as Mike Barnes
- William Christopher Ford as Dennis de Guzman
- Jonathan Avildsen as Snake
- Martin Kove as John Kreese
- Randee Heller as Lucille LaRusso
- Pat E. Johnson as Referee
- Rick Hurst as Announcer
- Frances Bay as Mrs. Milo
- Joseph V. Perry as Louie LaRusso Sr.
- Jan Tříska as Milos Dadok
- Gabriel Jarret as Rudy
- Glenn Medeiros as Himself

== Production ==
Robert Mark Kamen had originally wanted The Karate Kid Part III to be a prequel with the two main leads, Ralph Macchio and Pat Morita, still involved. The original plot would have involved Daniel LaRusso and Mr. Miyagi traveling to 16th century China in a dream and meeting Miyagi's ancestors. Kamen envisioned the sequel to resemble a Hong Kong-style Wuxia film and would also have a female protagonist. However, the producers balked at the idea and Kamen was reluctant on rehashing "the same story all over again"; he only returned after Columbia Pictures agreed to pay him substantially more.

After Robyn Lively was cast as Jessica Andrews in The Karate Kid Part III in 1988, producers were forced to modify her role of protagonist Daniel's new love interest because Lively was only 16 at the time of filming and still a minor, while Macchio was 27 (although his character Daniel is 17). This situation caused romantic scenes between Jessica and Daniel to be rewritten so that the pair only developed a close friendship. Although he plays Vietnam veteran Terry Silver, who is roughly 20 years older than Daniel, Thomas Ian Griffith is actually four months younger than Macchio. John Kreese was initially intended to have a larger role in the film, but due to Martin Kove's filming schedule conflicts with Hard Time on Planet Earth, the character of Silver was written into the script.

The film featured the same crew from the first two films, except for two key people: executive producer R.J. Louis, who was replaced by Sheldon Schrager and cinematographer James Crabe, who was forced to pull out due to the AIDS virus making him severely ill at the time, and was replaced by Steve Yaconelli. On May 2, 1989, Crabe died from AIDS at the age of 57; the film was dedicated to his memory.

== Release ==
The film was released in the United States on June 30, 1989. In the Philippines, the film was released on September 6.

=== Critical reception ===
On Rotten Tomatoes, the film holds an approval rating of 18% based on 61 reviews and an average rating of 3.9/10. The website's critics consensus reads: "Inspiration is in short supply in this third Karate Kid film, which recycles the basic narrative from its predecessors but adds scenery-chewing performances and a surprising amount of violence". On Metacritic, the film has a weighted average score of 36 out of 100, based on 12 critics, indicating "generally unfavorable reviews". Audiences polled by CinemaScore gave the film an average grade of "B−" on an A+ to F scale.

Roger Ebert, who praised the first two films, did not enjoy Part III. His colleague, Gene Siskel, also did not recommend the film, though he commended the performance of Thomas Ian Griffith, which he thought was nearly enough to save it. Critic Kevin Thomas of the Los Angeles Times stated that "writer Robert Mark Kamen gave director Avildsen and his cast too little to work with". Caryn James of The New York Times was critical of the lack of character development for the film's protagonist, saying that he "has aged about a year in movie time and hasn't become a day smarter" and criticized the film for having "the rote sense of film makers trying to crank out another moneymaker".

A 2008 DVD review of the film from Scott Weinberg of the website JoBlo said it was the installment of the series "where the wheels started to come off", remarking that it "approaches the Karate Kid formula as if it's the world's last home-cooked meatloaf", deriding the "cartoonishness" of the villains, and saying that "it all feels cynical and hollow...which is NOT the vibe we still get from Part 1". Reviewing a 2001 UK DVD of the film, Almar Haflidason of the BBC praised the disc's picture and sound quality, but dismissed the film as a "desperate continuation of The Karate Kid franchise [which] shudders to a pathetic halt" and criticized its loss of "any warmth of the previous two films".

The Karate Kid Part III was nominated for 5 awards at the 1989 Golden Raspberry Awards: Worst Picture (Jerry Weintraub); Worst Screenplay (Kamen); Worst Director (John G. Avildsen); Worst Actor (Macchio) and Worst Supporting Actor (Morita).

=== Legacy ===
In 2015, director John G. Avildsen called the film "a horrible imitation of the original...hastily written and sloppily rewritten", adding that it "will baffle those who haven't seen the first two (movies) and insult those who have". Ralph Macchio was also disappointed with the film, stating that he "just felt for the LaRusso character; he never seemed to go forward", and that when doing The Karate Kid Part III it "felt like we were redoing the first movie as a sort of cartoon, without the heart and soul which sold the original. It didn't help that we had characters mysteriously popping up for the sake of dramatic convenience."

Griffith, Lively, Kanan, and Ford would reprise their roles in the sequel series Cobra Kai, across the fourth through sixth seasons.
