= Daniel LaRusso =

Protagonist of The Karate Kid franchise

- The Karate Kid character
- Ralph Macchio as Daniel LaRusso as he appears in The Karate Kid (left) and Cobra Kai (right).
- First appearance: The Karate Kid (1984)
- Last appearance: Karate Kid: Legends (2025)
- Created by: Robert Mark Kamen
- Portrayed by: Ralph Macchio
- Voiced by: Joey Dedio (animated series); Ralph Macchio (Cobra Kai: The Karate Kid Saga Continues)

In-universe information
- Occupation: Sensei; Car dealership owner
- Affiliation: Miyagi-Do Karate (1984–1985; 1985–present); Cobra Kai Karate (1985; 2020–present); Larusso Autogroup (2002–present)
- Fighting style: Gōjū-ryū
- Family: Lucille LaRusso (mother)
- Spouses: Amanda LaRusso (née Steiner)
- Significant others: Ali Mills; Kumiko
- Children: Samantha LaRusso (daughter); Anthony LaRusso (son)
- Nationality: American
- Teacher: Mr. Miyagi; Terry Silver (briefly)
- Students: Samantha LaRusso; Robby Keene; Demetri Alexopoulos; Chris; Eli "Hawk" Moskowitz; Miguel Diaz; Anthony LaRusso; Johnny Lawrence (briefly); Li Fong

Daniel LaRusso is a fictional character and the main protagonist of The Karate Kid media franchise portrayed by Ralph Macchio. He was created by American screenwriter Robert Mark Kamen. Daniel is introduced as the titular protagonist of The Karate Kid (1984) and its sequels, The Karate Kid Part II (1986) and The Karate Kid Part III (1989). Nearly three decades later, Macchio reprised the role in the sequel television series Cobra Kai (2018–2025), which concluded with its sixth season. Additionally, Macchio stars in Karate Kid: Legends (2025), marking his first return as Daniel in a film from the franchise since the third installment.

In the first film, Daniel is depicted as an Italian-American 17-year-old who moves from New Jersey to the San Fernando Valley with his widowed mother Lucille. After becoming attracted to Ali Mills, Daniel becomes the target of bullying at the hands of Ali's arrogant ex-boyfriend and local karate champion Johnny Lawrence. To overcome the harassment, Daniel seeks tutelage in karate at the hands of his apartment's maintenance man Mr. Miyagi and is ultimately able to defeat Johnny at the All-Valley Under-18 Karate Tournament. In the sequels, Daniel continues to train under Miyagi and accompanies him to Okinawa, while also continuing to come into conflict with Johnny's karate dojo, Cobra Kai.

In Cobra Kai, set decades after the original film, Daniel has become the owner of LaRusso Auto, the most profitable car dealership in the Valley, and has two children, Samantha and Anthony, with his wife Amanda. Whilst Daniel is generally content, despite the death of Miyagi, he becomes paranoid when Cobra Kai is reopened at the hands of Johnny and opens a new dojo called Miyagi-Do. After Johnny's old sensei John Kreese returns to the Valley to usurp Johnny as the sensei of the Cobra Kai dojo, Daniel begrudgingly forms an alliance with Johnny to help put an end to the dojo.

== Concept and creation ==
=== Writing ===
The concept for the character originated in the experiences of American screenwriter Robert Mark Kamen. At the 1964 World's Fair in New York he was bullied by a gang, an event that resulted in his decision to take up karate. After being trained by a Marine captain who taught him an aggressive fighting style, he moved on to Okinawan Gōjū-ryū, a more defensive martial art, where he was trained every day for four hours by a sensei who had himself been a student of Chōjun Miyagi. As a screenwriter, Kamen was mentored by Frank Price, chairman of Columbia Pictures, who called him about a potential story concept. He said that producer Jerry Weintraub had seen a news article about a nine-year-old who was being repeatedly bullied and started to attend karate classes where he was trained by mentor similar to Miyagi. Kamen then wrote the screenplay titled The Karate Kid, based on aspects of his own life. The final draft was completed on September 15, 1983. Rather than writing an autobiography, Kamen wanted to write a story about his feelings for karate and having the ideal teacher. He incorporated Okinawan Gōjū-ryū into the screenplay but fabricated certain aspects for cinematic effect based on the blocking moves that he had learned, including "paint the fence" and "wax on, wax off". He initially named the protagonist "Daniel Webber" but decided to change it to "LaRusso" after seeing Ralph Macchio at audition.

=== Casting and training ===
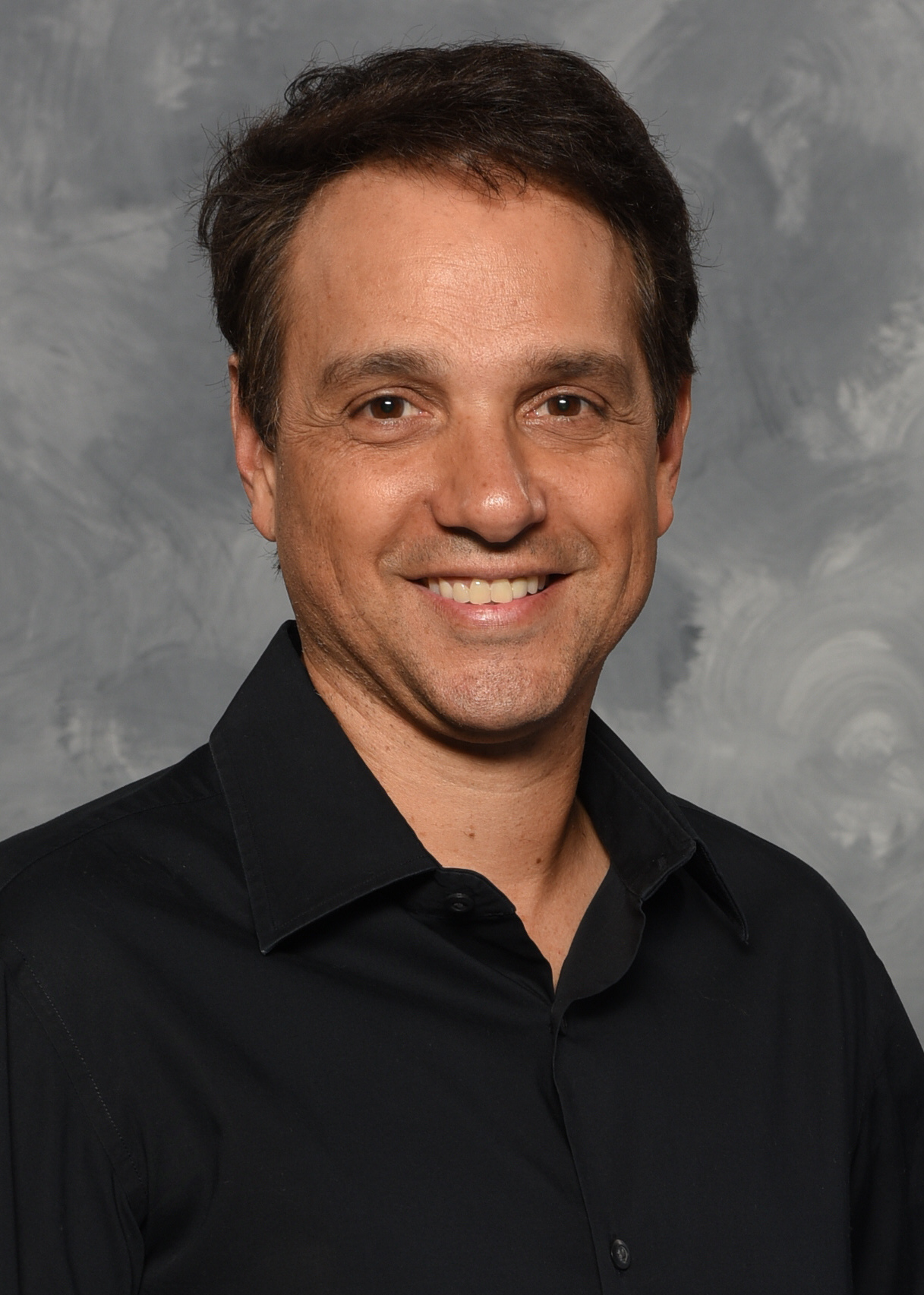
Ralph Macchio (pictured in 2017) portrays Daniel LaRusso in The Karate Kid films and Cobra Kai.

Several actors were considered for the title role of Daniel in September 1983, including Robert Downey Jr., Emilio Estevez, Nicolas Cage, Anthony Edwards, and Eric Stoltz. Casting director Bonnie Timmermann decided to bring 21-year-old Ralph Macchio to the role after remembering his performance in The Outsiders (1983). Macchio had little experience of martial arts, having only had a few lessons at a Jui Jitsu school when he was around ten years old. After auditioning for the role, director John G. Avildsen advised him to take karate lessons. Kamen described Macchio as "a skinny little string bean of a kid" who had no coordination for martial arts. After showing him some blocking and punching moves, Kamen realized that Macchio knew nothing about martial arts, but this suited the character as he wanted him to be characterized as the "paradigmatic wimp". Martial arts choreographer Pat Johnson trained Macchio before filming began on October 31, 1983, at Leo Carrillo Beach. Johnson trained Macchio and Pat Morita in the Okinawan karate style, while William Zabka and the Cobra Kai actors were trained separately by Johnson in a more aggressive style. He worked with Macchio to perform a crane kick, which involved holding out his arms and balancing on one leg. Kamen admitted that he had fabricated the crane kick and that it was impossible but "cinematic". The cast spent three months training for the fight sequences. Macchio recalled that by the time of filming the final fight in the film they were so well trained that it was like a "dance routine" and few changes were needed. Macchio found a particular ease and a natural chemistry working with Morita and learned about aspects of Japanese-American culture from him, including using the hachimaki during training.

== Commercial success and return ==
Following the success of the first film, Macchio reprised his role in The Karate Kid Part II (1986) and The Karate Kid Part III (1989). At the time of his casting, Columbia Pictures preempted the potential success of the first film with a three-film deal. Being in the early stages of his career, Macchio's part in The Karate Kid film transformed him into a box office star. Following the release of the first three films, Daniel LaRusso remained absent from the film franchise, being replaced by Hilary Swank in The Next Karate Kid (1994), and Jaden Smith in the 2010 reboot The Karate Kid. Macchio said that he was never invited to appear in The Next Karate Kid alongside Morita and assumed that it was due to Avildsen and Kamen not being involved in the project. Macchio avoided returning to the character for 34 years, stating that he had turned down various offers to protect the character's legacy. When executive producers Jon Hurwitz, Hayden Schlossberg and Josh Heald pitched the concept for Cobra Kai, Macchio said that he was interested in their story development as they were fans of the film series, but described it as a "faith jump" to return to the character. Macchio felt that the nature of bullying had changed since 1984, but thought it was important to tackle the issue for a younger generation of viewers. He also stipulated that it was important for Mr. Miyagi to be a part of Daniel's life, despite the absence of Morita, who died in 2005. Macchio was also inspired by Creed (2015), a film in the Rocky franchise. Both franchises were connected by Avildsen and a film featuring the sons of Rocky Balboa and Daniel had been considered but abandoned. In Cobra Kai, Macchio noted there were some slight changes to Daniel's personality: "He always had a kind of bravado and a little bit of a knee-jerk temper. But this was times 10 on Cobra Kai." After wrapping filming on the final season of Cobra Kai, Macchio went straight into the production of Karate Kid: Legends (2025), feeling the necessity of carrying the emotion of what Daniel's mentor Mr. Miyagi meant to him and "paying it forward".

== Overview ==
Fifteen-year-old Daniel LaRusso moves with his mother Lucille from Newark, New Jersey to Reseda, California after she accepts a job offer at a computer firm. Shortly after moving to California, Daniel meets and starts a rivalry with Johnny Lawrence, the two-time defending champion of the All-Valley Karate Championship when Daniel becomes friends with his ex-girlfriend Ali Mills. After being jumped by Johnny and his Cobra Kai friends, he is saved by Mr. Miyagi, the maintenance man at his apartment building. Miyagi agrees to become his karate mentor. Through his training, Daniel becomes skilled enough to defeat Johnny in the tournament's final match.

Over the summer, Daniel spends more time with Mr. Miyagi as they go to Okinawa, where Daniel meets a girl named Kumiko who becomes his love interest. He gets into a rivalry with Chozen, who is Sato's karate student and nephew. Daniel eventually defeats Chozen in a fight to the death, but instead of killing him, shows mercy to Chozen. After returning home, Daniel picks up one more karate championship in the All-Valley Tournament after being forced to compete in the tournament and defeats the national karate champion Mike Barnes, becoming a two-time champion, and ending Terry Silver and John Kreese's vision of opening up multiple Cobra Kai dojos all across the valley.

33 years later, Daniel is the owner of a successful car dealership in Southern California and is married to Amanda, with whom they have two children named Samantha "Sam" and Anthony. They live in a large home with a swimming pool in Encino. Despite his success as an adult, Daniel lacks the life balance that he had in his youth, due to the death of Mr. Miyagi in 2011. Daniel's interest in karate reignites after he learns of the return of the Cobra Kai dojo, now run by Lawrence. This drives Daniel to reopen Miyagi-Do and pass on his mentor's teachings to a new generation of students, resulting in rivalry between the two dojos.

== Characterization ==
"LaRusso's intentions have always been grounded and good. It's just he gets in his own way. His temper gets in his own way because his passion is so high, and his belief in what is right is heavy-handed at times because he has such strength in his beliefs."

— Ralph Macchio describing Daniel LaRusso in 2022

Recalling the original screenplay for The Karate Kid, Macchio expressed an affinity with his role as Daniel, saying that he "felt like someone I knew". He said that he shared an "East Coast bravado" with the character, which he used as a defensive strategy due to looking young for his age. Being from the suburbs of Long Island, Macchio put emphasis on his New York accent and used this to underline Daniel's attitude as he moves from east coast to west coast. In the first film, Daniel is new to the area and feels the need to defend his roots. Macchio noted that despite these similarities, Daniel is a character that would never quit a fight, whereas Macchio would have found a way to avoid it. He described his character as a "relatable underdog" and an "everykid next door" who overcomes the odds and ends up becoming a winner. Macchio worked to portray Daniel with a cocky but sweet personality, a character who has goodness in his heart despite putting on a hard exterior. His natural chemistry with Pat Morita was reflected onscreen in the bond between Daniel and Mr. Miyagi. In Cobra Kai, Macchio noted the similarities between Daniel and rival Johnny Lawrence, commenting that they are both good guys but the story explores the nuances of their characters. Thus, in the first season, he portrayed Daniel as a "jerk" in the midst of a mid-life crisis, who has to find balance and support in his family and friends. Macchio said that Daniel feels the presence of Mr. Miyagi through the support of his loved ones despite having lost his mentor. Cobra Kai begins by focusing on the rivalry between Daniel and Johnny, with each pursuing their own style of martial art. As Mr. Miyagi is a father figure to Daniel, he feels a deep responsibility to honour him and prevent the violence that he experienced in his youth from coming back to the San Fernando Valley, and this motivates him to get Cobra Kai closed down. Although Daniel finds inner peace in Okinawan karate, Macchio said that he is less patient than Mr. Miyagi and struggles with his inferior ability to teach, but eventually learns to find his own way.

== Appearances ==
=== The Karate Kid (1984) ===
Widowed mother Lucille LaRusso uproots herself and her only child, Daniel, from New Jersey to the South Seas Apartments in Reseda, California. Daniel is invited by his neighbor, Freddy Fernandez, to a beach party, where he meets Ali Mills. He is beaten in a fight by her ex-boyfriend Johnny Lawrence. During his first month in school, Daniel is constantly bullied by Johnny and his Cobra Kai gang. At the school's Halloween dance, Daniel attempts to get back at Johnny by placing a hose above the toilet stall getting him wet, but Daniel is chased by Johnny and his gang, who corner him and assault him until Mr. Miyagi, the apartment's maintenance man, intervenes and saves Daniel. The next day, Mr. Miyagi confronts Cobra Kai sensei John Kreese and proposes that Daniel and Johnny settle their feud in the upcoming All Valley Karate Championships tournament on December 19, 1984.

Daniel is initially upset with Mr. Miyagi over the arrangement, but Mr. Miyagi assures him that with the proper karate training, Daniel will no longer have to worry about Cobra Kai. Mr. Miyagi has Daniel do mundane chores at his house such as waxing his classic cars, sanding the wood floors, painting the fence, and painting the house. Not understanding his teacher's methods, Daniel threatens to quit, but Mr. Miyagi shows that the chores double as defensive techniques, which Daniel has learned through muscle memory. While training, Daniel develops a relationship with Ali. Mr. Miyagi allows Daniel to choose one of his classic cars as a gift on his 18th birthday and a reward for getting his driver's license and also gifts Daniel a Karate gi for the tournament.

At the tournament, Daniel unexpectedly advances toward the semi-finals. Kreese instructs Bobby Brown, one of his more compassionate students, to put Daniel out of commission. Bobby reluctantly delivers an illegal kick to Daniel's knee, getting himself disqualified while Johnny looks at Kreese in disgust. Just before Johnny is declared the winner by default, Ali informs the tournament announcer that Daniel will fight in the final match. During the fight, Daniel gains the upper hand and gives Johnny a bloody nose. Kreese orders Johnny to sweep Daniel's leg, an unethical move and he reluctantly agrees. In fear of his sensei, Johnny hits Daniel's bad leg with an elbow strike and receives a warning from the referee. Upon the restart of the round, Daniel wins the match after landing a crane kick to Johnny's face. Having gained respect for his nemesis, Johnny gives Daniel the trophy, as an enthusiastic crowd carries Daniel while Mr. Miyagi looks on proudly.

=== The Karate Kid Part II (1986) ===
As Daniel and Mr. Miyagi are leaving, they see Kreese berating Johnny for standing up to him and for placing second, breaking his trophy and then strangling him. Miyagi intervenes and defeats Kreese easily, comically tweaking his nose before walking away. Six months later, Daniel returns early one morning to Mr. Miyagi's house from his senior prom dressed in a tuxedo and driving the now badly beaten-up car Miyagi had given him. Surprised, Mr. Miyagi asks what happened, and Daniel angrily blames Ali for the damage and says that they broke up since she fell in love with "some football player from UCLA". Later, when Daniel learns that Mr. Miyagi is going to Okinawa to visit his dying father, Daniel uses his college fund to go with him. Upon their arrival, they meet Sato, a wealthy businessman and Mr. Miyagi's former best friend. Later, Daniel meets Kumiko, a teenager who aspires to move to Tokyo and pursue a career in dancing. He also encounters Sato's nephew Chozen Toguchi, and the two become enemies after Daniel inadvertently exposes the corruption in Chozen's grocery business. One day in town, Chozen challenges Daniel to chop a row of ice sheets; however, Daniel wins Chozen's wager by using Mr. Miyagi's breathing exercise and successfully breaking all of the ice sheets. Miyagi tells Daniel to keep his winnings for college.

The Toguchi family continues to terrorize the village until a typhoon hits Okinawa. During the storm, Sato is pinned by debris from his family's dojo and rescued by Daniel and Miyagi, while Chozen runs away. As a result, Sato lets go of his decades-old grudge with Mr. Miyagi and he offers to rebuild the village, disowning his nephew for refusing to help Daniel rescue a little girl from the typhoon. Chozen furiously crashes the village's Obon festival, taking Kumiko hostage and challenging Daniel to a fight to the death. Daniel and Chozen fight a brutal and bloody fight, while Miyagi, Sato, and the crowd use their handheld drums to motivate Daniel and defeat his opponent with the Miyagi family drum technique. After gaining the upper hand, Daniel grabs Chozen and threatens to end his life by saying, "Live or die, man?!" Chozen chooses death, but remembering the way Miyagi handled Kreese following the tournament, Daniel honks Chozen's nose and drops him to the ground. Daniel embraces Kumiko while the villagers cheer.

=== The Karate Kid Part III (1989) ===
Daniel and Mr. Miyagi return to Los Angeles from Okinawa to discover that their apartment building has been sold and is undergoing demolition, leaving Daniel homeless and Mr. Miyagi unemployed. Lucille is back in New Jersey to care for Daniel's uncle Louie. Mr. Miyagi invites Daniel to stay with him for a while, and Daniel uses the rest of his college fund to help his mentor set up a bonsai tree nursery. Daniel also befriends Jessica Andrews, who manages the pottery shop across the street.

Daniel receives an invitation to defend his championship title at the next All Valley Karate Championships, but Mr. Miyagi advises him to ignore it, seeing no point in the competition. Daniel is confronted by the prodigious and undefeated karateka Mike Barnes, who threatens him into defending his title and steals the shop's bonsai trees. Terry Silver, a friend of Kreese and co-founder of the Cobra Kai dojo, offers to train Daniel for the tournament. Daniel is unaware that this is an elaborate scheme devised by Kreese and Cobra Kai to exact revenge on him by physically weakening him into defeat at Barnes' hands. Silver hopes that this will revive Cobra Kai and promises to give Barnes partial ownership of the dojo in exchange for his help. Silver's methods start to corrupt Daniel, who becomes more aggressive and short-tempered as well as alienated from Miyagi and Jessica. Realizing this after he attacks a man at the nightclub who had been bribed by Silver, Daniel apologizes to Miyagi and Jessica and reconciles with them. Daniel confronts Silver and tells him that he no longer wishes to defend his title, after which Silver reveals his scheme. When Kreese reveals himself and Barnes attacks Daniel, Mr. Miyagi saves his pupil and agrees to train him for the tournament.

At the tournament, Barnes swiftly advances to face Daniel in the final round. He uses Silver and Kreese's tactic of scoring a point, then losing it with an illegal move (nearly getting disqualified in the process) until they reach the sudden death round. After Mr. Miyagi prevents him from conceding the match, Daniel performs a kata in the sudden death round. Barnes charges at Daniel, but Daniel flips him to the ground and strikes him to win the tournament. Daniel and Miyagi embrace and celebrate their victory.

=== Cobra Kai (2018–2025) ===
==== Season 1 ====
Thirty-three years later, Daniel is happily married to his wife Amanda Steiner, and has two children, Samantha "Sam" and Anthony. He and his wife own the LaRusso Auto Group, a chain of car dealerships in the San Fernando Valley. Daniel unexpectedly encounters Johnny when his car is wrecked. Daniel, unaware that Sam was a passenger when her friends accidentally caused the wreck, offers to fix his car for free, considering Johnny an old friend. He later discovers that Johnny has reopened the Cobra Kai dojo in Reseda. Fearing that Johnny will create a new generation of bullies, he starts to undermine Cobra Kai and begins to struggle with family and business issues. Daniel's cousin Louie hires a local biker gang to vandalize Johnny's car in retaliation for Johnny vandalizing Daniel's billboard, forcing Daniel to fire Louie and give Johnny a new car as compensation. Johnny's estranged son, Robby Keene, gets a job at LaRusso Auto Group to get back at his father for neglecting him in favor of Miguel. Unaware that Robby is Johnny's son, Daniel takes him in as his karate student. Daniel proves to be a positive influence on Robby, who later turns against his miscreant friends when they plot to rob the dealership. Upon learning that Robby is Johnny's son, Daniel furiously banishes Robby from his home and dealership as punishment for his dishonesty. Nonetheless, Robby participates in the All-Valley Karate Tournament against Cobra Kai as an independent fighter unaffiliated with any dojo. In the semifinals, Robby's left shoulder is badly injured when Cobra Kai student Hawk attacks him from behind and subsequently gets disqualified in the process. After Robby apologizes to Daniel for his deception, Daniel decides to reconcile with Robby and coaches him for the duration of the final match with Miguel under the Miyagi-Do name. Robby loses a close fight to Miguel, who fights dishonorably by exploiting Robby's injury from the semi-finals match with Hawk. With teacher and student reconciled, Daniel plans to expand Miyagi-Do with an official dojo to oppose Cobra Kai with Robby as his senior student.

==== Season 2 ====
Daniel opens the Miyagi-Do dojo and offers his lessons for free, threatening Cobra Kai's business. Daniel allows Robby to move into his home when Robby is evicted from his apartment and his mother Shannon abandoning him by going on vacation to Mexico with her boyfriend. Daniel proceeds to train him and Sam together. He discovers that Kreese has returned to Cobra Kai. Daniel has trouble acquiring students, most of whom are not receptive to his chore-based muscle memory training style and defensive techniques. Daniel tries to be the bigger man after Cobra Kai upstages their demonstration at the local Valley Fest. He also takes on Demetri as a student, which proves challenging due to his persistent whining. Without Johnny's knowledge, a small group of Cobra Kai students vandalize Daniel's dojo and his prized convertible and steal Mr. Miyagi's Medal of Honor. This pushes Daniel to confront Johnny at the Cobra Kai dojo, leading to numerous students walking out to join Miyagi-Do. Despite this success, Daniel's passion leads to him neglecting his auto business, forcing Amanda to run it alone. Despite an uneasy reconciliation with Johnny, the rivalry flares again after a misunderstanding caused by Robby bringing Sam to spend the night at Johnny's apartment after she gets drunk at a party, resulting in Daniel furiously cutting ties with Johnny and Robby. The animosity between the two begins to affect their respective students and the growing tension between the dojos finally explodes into a massive karate war on the first day of school when Cobra Kai student Tory Nichols picks a fight with Sam in retaliation for a drunken kiss with Miguel at Moon's party. Sam is hospitalized with broken ribs and lacerations on her right arm, while Miguel is paralyzed and accidentally crippled by Robby. This allows Kreese to take control of Cobra Kai and force Johnny out. Amanda furiously demands that Daniel close down the dojo and stop all karate activities to prevent future incidents. Feeling that he has tainted Mr. Miyagi's legacy, Daniel reluctantly obliges.

==== Season 3 ====
In the aftermath of the school fight, the LaRussos' reputation has been tarnished. Daniel finds Robby at Shannon's rehabilitation facility and has the police take Robby into custody to lessen his sentence. Robby angrily accuses Daniel of betrayal and ends their friendship. Upon learning that his business rival Tom Cole had a hand in dissolving his business partnership with Doyona International, Daniel heads to Tokyo to salvage his business. He visits Okinawa, where he reunites with Kumiko. There Kumiko reads him one of Mr. Miyagi's final love letters to her aunt Yukie and arranges a meeting with Chozen to reconcile. After a few sparring sessions, Chozen gives Daniel a martial arts move scroll describing pressure point techniques. Daniel's business partnership is saved when he learns that Yuna, the young girl that he saved in the typhoon, is now the Vice President of Sales for Doyona. Upon his return, Daniel attempts to bring down Cobra Kai through legal means, but fails when Kreese files a restraining order against Amanda. They attempt to enlist Armand Zakarian to evict Kreese, but he beats up Armand's nephews and retaliates by setting a cobra loose in the LaRussos' dealership. Daniel and Amanda resume classes at Miyagi-Do and tries to get Sam's support. During a fishing trip, Daniel opens up to her about his fight with Barnes in the 1985 All-Valley Tournament as a means of helping her confront her fear of Tory. When the council cancels support for the All-Valley Karate tournament, Daniel attempts to make a case for re-opening it, but is rejected. Miguel and Sam, who have rekindled their relationship, persuade the council members to let the tournament go on. When Daniel catches Miguel and Sam making out in the dojo the following day, Daniel has a talk with him. He is surprised to find that Miguel's upbringing mirrors his own and agrees to let Miguel continue dating Sam. Daniel reunites with Ali and introduces her to Amanda, unaware that Ali invited Johnny. During dinner, Ali prompts Daniel and Johnny to put aside their differences. Samantha and Miguel manage to get the students of Daniel's and Johnny's dojos together at the LaRusso house to bring down Cobra Kai, just in time to thwart an attack led by Tory and the Cobra Kai gang. Daniel goes to Cobra Kai to confront Kreese. He saves Johnny just as Kreese is trying to strangle him and takes on Kreese in a one-on-one fight. Daniel uses the pressure point strikes he learned from Chozen to immobilize Kreese. With Johnny's approval, Daniel poises to strike a fatal blow, but Miguel and Sam's arrival brings him back to his senses. Kreese, Johnny, and Daniel agree to temporarily cease hostilities to train for the tournament and make a deal that if Cobra Kai wins the next All-Valley tournament, Daniel and Johnny will stop teaching karate, but if Miyagi Do and Eagle Fang win, Kreese will leave and shut down Cobra Kai. Daniel is devastated to find that Robby has joined Cobra Kai. Finding common ground with Johnny, the pair train together with their students at the Miyagi-Do dojo.

==== Season 4 ====
The philosophical differences between Daniel and Johnny cause a rift in the Miyagi-Do/Eagle Fang union, leaving the students of both factions confused. They eventually reach an agreement to teach each other their own style of karate. Daniel teaches the Eagle Fang students while Johnny takes the Miyagi-Do students under his wing. Daniel forms a bond with Miguel as he teaches him to drive and fix his mother's car. Daniel and Johnny discover that Kreese has teamed up with Terry Silver. Their differences fail to subside and a drinking session leads to Johnny issuing a rematch with Daniel. The fight ends in a double-knockout with no clear winner before Johnny finally decides to end his partnership with Daniel after they have another argument. Daniel tries to teach Anthony Miyagi-Do karate but is disappointed when he goes behind his back to pay someone from TaskRabbit to wash the cars for him. Daniel and Amanda are horrified when they learn that Anthony has been suspended for bullying new student Kenny Payne. Daniel's cousin Vanessa deduces that Daniel and Amanda's lack of attention towards Anthony is the source of his problems. Daniel subsequently strikes discipline in Anthony by furiously breaking an iPad that Anthony snuck into his room. A rift forms between Daniel and Sam as she takes a liking to Johnny's style of karate. Daniel enters his students in the All-Valley Tournament alongside Eagle Fang and Cobra Kai. During the tournament, Daniel is dismayed when he discovers that Robby has taught his fellow Cobra Kai students the Miyagi-do style of karate and confronts him. Robby insists that he will do whatever it takes to win and get revenge on Daniel and Johnny for abandoning him. In response, Daniel gives him a lesson to never put passion before principle, because even if he wins, it will mean nothing. Daniel's own students use both styles of karate with success, so he agrees to team up with Johnny to defeat Cobra Kai during the final matches of both the boys and girls tournaments. Despite Eli defeating Robby for the Boys' Championship, both Miyagi-do and Eagle Fang lose to Cobra Kai. Silver secretly bribed the referee to rig the final match and frame Kreese for attempting to murder Stingray and takes control of Cobra Kai. Daniel decides to renege on his earlier deal with Kreese to stop teaching karate after losing, and decides to take Johnny's advice on going on the offense. While paying his respects to Mr. Miyagi at his grave, he reveals that he has teamed up with Chozen to finally take down Cobra Kai.

==== Season 5 ====
Daniel begins his scheme to take down Cobra Kai, but Johnny declines to assist. Silver attempts to dissuade Daniel by warning him that he will retaliate. Suspecting that Silver plans to reach out to Mike Barnes, Daniel approaches Barnes first, only to discover that he is now running a furniture store in Agoura Hills. Barnes apologizes to Daniel for his actions against him in 1985 and offers to help by giving incriminating information, but Silver retaliates by burning down Barnes' store. Silver works to drive a wedge between Daniel and Amanda by gaslighting Amanda into thinking Daniel is unhinged, causing Amanda to storm off and return to her hometown in Ohio. Amanda eventually reconciles with Daniel after learning about his negative history with Silver from her cousin Jessica Andrews. Johnny helps Daniel to see the impact of his actions on his family while Daniel indirectly helps Johnny to settle the differences between Miguel and Robby. After getting a tip from Tory that Kreese was framed, Daniel approaches Stingray to get him to confess against Silver, who responds by ambushing and severely injuring Daniel at Stingray's apartment. The fight leaves Daniel demoralized and unwilling to continue the fight against Silver. Knowing that they need Daniel's leadership, Amanda takes Daniel to Mr. Miyagi's house and gives him the advice. Robby, who has rejoined Miyagi-Do, reveals how much Daniel's teachings mean to him. Daniel is convinced not to give up and decides to re-open Miyagi-Do. At Amanda's suggestion, Daniel and Johnny reluctantly approach Kreese in prison and he reveals that Silver intends to enroll Cobra Kai in an elite international karate tournament, the Sekai Taikai, to make Cobra Kai a global franchise. Daniel, Johnny, Chozen, and Amanda attempt to convince the committee that Miyagi-Do and Eagle Fang are the better choice, culminating in both sides being invited in. Daniel and Johnny, who continue to operate their own separate dojos, are informed that they must choose a single name for the tournament. After learning that Johnny and Carmen are expecting a baby, Chozen, Daniel and Amanda spend the night celebrating at a nightclub with the couple. Barnes confronts Daniel by hijacking the limo and demands retribution against Silver for the destruction of his furniture store. Johnny and Chozen agree to help Barnes, while Daniel ends up stranded after Barnes drives the limo with Johnny and Chozen to confront Silver. Daniel's students break into Cobra Kai with Tory's help to steal security footage of Silver's attack on Stingray and upload it to the dojo's YouTube channel. With the footage having been erased, they alternatively upload footage of Silver's confession to Tory about bribing the 2019 All-Valley Tournament referee, breaking the Cobra Kai faith in Silver. Daniel is picked up by Stingray, who agrees to help take down Silver by giving him a ride to the Cobra Kai dojo. In a final showdown, Daniel defeats Silver using the Cobra Kai techniques that Silver had taught Daniel before finishing the fight with the crane kick. Silver is arrested, as the Miyagi-Do and Eagle Fang students celebrate their victory. Daniel and Johnny are informed that Kreese has faked his death to escape from prison.

==== Season 6 ====
After Silver is defeated and his Cobra Kai empire is no more, Daniel's life seems to be going uphill. He and Johnny are now preparing their students for the Sekai Taikai tournament. Daniel tells Amanda that after they win, he plans on retiring from being a sensei. He helps Johnny find a job when Johnny needs income to provide for his newfound family. While training for the tournament, Daniel discovers something about Mr. Miyagi's past, a chest full of boxing gloves and a newspaper clipping of an event that happened in 1947, in which Miyagi was allegedly involved in an assault and robbery of Jim Watkins. Shocked and dismayed to learn of this, Daniel becomes disillusioned. When the announcement is made that the Sekai Taikai will be held in Barcelona, Spain and each dojo must choose six of their best fighters with one boy and girl to serve as captains, they recruit Mike Barnes to judge. When Daniel finds out that Johnny fought Barnes to change his mind about cutting Devon Lee, and have a capture the flag challenge in the woods, this drives a wedge in his relationship with Johnny. When it is time to choose captains, Daniel referees Robby and Miguel's match, which Robby wins after Tory’s arrival helps him make a comeback from Miguel scoring the first two points, but as Johnny is refereeing Sam and Tory's match, Daniel orders the match stopped seeing that Tory is not clear headed and is fighting ruthlessly after the unexpecting passing of her mother, Johnny gets upset especially after not allowing Tory to finish the fight for the female captain spot on Miyagi-Do. In an argument with Johnny about how it is not the way to teach violence, Johnny finally snaps and angrily calls out Daniel for his hypocrisy at dehumanizing Mr. Miyagi saying that he was not a perfect angel, but a liar and a thief. In anger, Daniel punches Johnny, further straining his partnership with Johnny as he furiously vows to end it permanently once they finish the tournament. As they crown Robby and Sam as captains with traditional headbands, Daniel finds a similar headband in the chest covered with blood. In Barcelona, as Miyagi-Do arrives at the arena, they are all shocked to see Kreese and Kim Da Eun with the new South Korea version of Cobra Kai with Kwon Jae Sung as male captain and to everyone's shock, Tory as female captain.

At the start of the tournament, Miyagi-Do has trouble with keeping up with all the experienced dojos, especially South Korea's Cobra Kai, but both have difficulty with the defending champions, the Hong Kong based Iron dragons, led by Feng Xiao, aka Sensei Wolf, with Axel Kovacevic as male captain, and Zara Malik as female captain. Eventually, Daniel sent out to find more clues about Mr. Miyagi's past, following a lead of Sensei Serrano who was said to have competed in the Sekai Taikai at one time, and is living in Barcelona, that takes him to the city's back alley, but he was kidnapped and locked in the cage with a bunch of dogs, He manages to escape and take out the thug who kidnapped him, including one of them who is a Cobra Kai assassin. Although he misses the next tournament match, Miyagi-Do avoids elimination. Daniel later finds out through Chozen and Kim, along with Kreese that Terry Silver is sponsoring Wolf and the Iron Dragons, he reveals he orchestrated the kidnapping as a way of throwing Daniel off balance. The thug that kidnapped Daniel is revealed to be Dennis, who helped Barnes torment him previously. After Johnny and Miguel come back to Barcelona, they bring Kenny along since he would be replacing Devon on the team. Daniel informs the others of Silver's return and vows to take him down once and for all. Daniel, Johnny, and Chozen attempt to manipulate their enemies by stealing Kreese's eunjangdo and framing Silver for taking it in order to throw them off balance but the attempt was unsuccessful and Chozen is forced to return the eunjangdo. When Miyagi-Do defeat Cobra Kai to earn a spot in the semifinals, Silver presents Daniel with the results from the 1958 Sekai Taikai, which Mr. Miyagi competed in and finds out that his match ended with Mr. Miyagi killing his opponent. Daniel has a nightmare about fighting Mr. Miyagi in the tournament; he asks Mr. Miyagi why he never told him about this. Mr. Miyagi angrily responds that Daniel was never strong enough to accept the truth. Before the semifinals get underway, Gunther informs everyone that one of the finalist dojos, Tiger Strike, cheated by using performance enhancing drugs; this disqualifies them and gives Cobra Kai another chance. Daniel and Johnny become more upset over this and both begin to lose it until Miguel steps in and reminds them what they are there for. Johnny and Daniel fully rekindle and help train Robby and Sam. In the semifinals, Kwon and Zara both win their matches, and Robby fights Axel, but he is unable to land a point on him. Kwon takes the opportunity to elbow Robby in the ribs; as Gunther is trying to restore order, Tiger Strike shows up and starts a brawl. During the chaos, Daniel ends up battling and easily defeating Dennis, before helping Johnny against Wolf. When Johnny goes after Kreese, Daniel continues to fight Wolf. Wolf is about to finish Daniel when two other senseis crash into him. Once free from Wolf, he notices Kwon holding Kreese's eunjangdo, as he tries to get him before he uses it on Axel, he is too late to save him as he accidentally impales himself with it, killing himself. Everyone is in shock by this and Gunther furiously orders the feed cut.

After Kwon's death, the tournament is cancelled and everyone returns to their normal lives. Daniel wants nothing more to do with karate and even takes bonsai trees off the sales for customers. At the dealership, Silver ambushes Johnny, who tries to convince Daniel to finish the tournament, at a meeting with the three, Silver says he needs this one last win before he dies of terminal illness given that it is the only thing he has left in the world, he agrees to let Daniel choose the venue and agrees the valley should host it. Picking up where the tournament left off. Robby is able to land a few hits on Axel, but Axel under Wolf and Silver‘s orders reluctantly breaks Robby's right leg, causing Robby to be eliminated. Daniel has a nightmare of fighting skeleton people reminiscent of Johhny and his friends when he was bullied by them, before being safe by Mr. Miyagi's spirit, Daniel tearfully asked Mr. Miyagi why he never told him about his past and why did he leave him when he needed him most; Mr. Miyagi responds that despite everything that has happened, they cannot win this fight, and reminds Daniel that winning and losing was not the reason why he fought and he did not try to fight at all and is in that moment that Daniel realizes that he trained in karate so he would not have to fight and that others would not have to get the best with him with that knowledge. Daniel finally accepts that his mentor was not a perfect person, but still honors the teachings that he had given him. When Sam drops out of the tournament, this eliminates Miyagi-Do, but with the help of Kreese, Johnny takes back Cobra Kai returning under a good and honorable leash, and have Miguel become male captain with Tory as the female captain. Daniel even buys Johnny back the old Cobra Kai dojo and Daniel admits that when he first saw the Cobra Kai dojo, it brought up a lot of bad memories, but now he realizes that Cobra Kai will always exist and that he trust and Johnny will run it the right way to restore its honorable reputation. In the finals, both Tory and Miguel respectively win their fights defeating Zara and Axel to become world champions, this eventually puts both Cobra Kai and the Iron Dragons in a tie, which leads to a one final matchup that will determine the winner between Johnny and Wolf. Daniel and Chozen train Johnny. Around this point, he learns about the true circumstances of what Mr. Miyagi's alleged assault and robbery when his mother Lucille, gives Sam a pearl necklace as a graduation gift. Lucille explains the pearl necklace actually belonged to Mr. Miyagi‘s mother, whom he gave to his wife instead of selling it for money when he moved to America. When his wife died at the Manzanar internment camp in the 1940s, the guard, Jim Watkins, stole her necklace. Mr. Miyagi soon retrieved the necklace, but ended up beating Watkins in self-defense when the guard himself tried to attack him. As the final matchup between Wolf and Johnny gets on the way, it is clear that Wolf is physically younger and stronger and faster and able to hit Johnny when Daniel knows that Johnny is afraid and doesn’t know what to do. At the final tiebreaker point, Daniel gives Johnny a Cobra Kai speech about how fear does not exist in this dojo. This inspires Johnny enough to break out of his mental breakdown, by recalling what made him lose back in 1984 against Daniel, and he is able to go on the defensive. As Wolf misses as a result of Johnny sweeping the leg, Johnny is able to punch and kick Wolf until he is finally knocked down, winning the match and Cobra Kai is declared, for the first time, world champions. Johnny calls Daniel over to share the victory and Daniel says, "You’re alright Lawrence!" in callback to Johnny accepting his loss to Daniel in the first film. In the aftermath of the Sekai Takai, Daniel and Johnny work together with both Miyagi-Do and Cobra Kai dojos finding a balance between offensive and defensive techniques. In the ending, Johnny and Daniel are seen eating in a Japanese restaurant where Daniel and Johnny discuss the upcoming All Valley Tournament, proposing that Anthony should learn Cobra Kai while Devon learns Miyagi-Do. As Johnny leaves, Daniel then tries to catch a fly with chopsticks, also as a callback to the first film, only for Johnny to squish it saying, "No Mercy!"

=== Karate Kid: Legends (2025) ===
Macchio reprised his role as Daniel LaRusso in Karate Kid: Legends, the sixth film in the franchise. He appears opposite Jackie Chan in events that take place three years after Cobra Kai. Chan reprises his role as Mr. Han from the 2010 film and enlists the help of Daniel to train his top student and great-nephew Li Fong (played by Ben Wang) Miyagi-do karate. In the end, after Li wins the five boroughs tournament, he sends Daniel a pizza thanking him for his help, plus $1100, plus a tip as a joke, he offers to share it with Johnny Lawrence, who comes up with an idea for a new pizza chain called Miyagi dough, although Daniel scoffs at the idea.

== In other media ==
In 1989, Daniel LaRusso appeared in The Karate Kid animated television series, voiced by Joey Dedio. The plot recounts his global adventures alongside Mr. Miyagi and a character named Taki. In June 2010, Macchio appeared in Funny or Die's online short, "Wax On, F*ck Off", in which his loved ones stage an intervention to turn the former child star from a well-adjusted family man into an addict besieged with tabloid scandal in order to help his career with references to The Karate Kid. In 2013, Macchio and Zabka made guest appearances as themselves in the television sitcom How I Met Your Mother ("The Bro Mitzvah"). In the episode, Macchio is invited to Barney Stinson's bachelor party, leading to Barney shouting that he hates Macchio, and that Johnny was the real hero of The Karate Kid. In 2013, Macchio also voiced Daniel in an episode of Robot Chicken entitled "Caffeine-Induced Aneurysm". In 2018, LaRusso was inducted into the Fictitious Athlete Hall of Fame. Daniel LaRusso appears in a side-scrolling fighting game titled Cobra Kai: The Karate Kid Saga Continues, which was published by GameMill Entertainment on October 27, 2020. Macchio returned to voice the character for the game alongside Zabka voicing Johnny. The Karate Kid musical was announced to be in development for Broadway in January 2020, with Kamen working alongside songwriter Drew Gasparini and director Amon Miyamoto. In October 2024, Coldplay released the song "The Karate Kid", which includes lyrics about "Daniel". Macchio was invited by the band to fly to Australia to appear in the music video.

== Reception ==
In response to the release of the first film in 1984, critic Roger Ebert praised the friendship between Daniel and Mr. Miyagi as especially interesting, particularly the central sequence in which Daniel begins his training by doing household chores like painting the fence. Sarah Weldon of Entertainment Weekly described Daniel LaRusso as "everyone's favorite '80s hero" and the first film in the franchise as an "enduring coming-of-age film". MovieWeb writer Sonija Hinduja named Macchio's portrayal of the character as a "beloved mainstay in pop culture". Michael Schneider of Variety commented that elements of Daniel's story in The Karate Kid had become "iconic pop culture moments" that would always be associated with Macchio's performance, including the crane kick, "wax on, wax off" and "Daniel-san". Columnist Bill Simmons writing for ESPN opined that the first three films were the "holy trilogy" of The Karate Kid franchise and that the franchise "lived and died" with Daniel LaRusso. Den of Geek writer Gene Ching commented that The Karate Kid introduced martial arts into family entertainment and transformed Daniel and Mr. Miyagi into "crane-kicking icons". Yardbarker listed The Karate Kid as one of the most inspirational sports films and praised Daniel LaRusso for using karate to promote acceptance and confidence.

Daniel's competition winning crane kick to Johnny Lawrence's face in the finale of The Karate Kid has been the subject of longstanding media debate about whether the move was illegal and he should have been disqualified. Macchio himself opined that it went against competition rules but disagreed that Daniel was the real bad guy. This was later referenced in the characters' dialogue in Cobra Kai.
