= The Karate Kid (2010 film) =

Film by Harald Zwart

- Theatrical release poster
- Directed by: Harald Zwart
- Screenplay by: Christopher Murphey
- Story by: Robert Mark Kamen
- Produced by: Jerry Weintraub; Will Smith; Jada Pinkett Smith; James Lassiter; Ken Stovitz
- Starring: Jaden Smith; Jackie Chan; Taraji P. Henson
- Cinematography: Roger Pratt
- Edited by: Joel Negron
- Music by: James Horner
- Production companies: Columbia Pictures; China Film Group; Overbrook Entertainment; JW Productions
- Distributed by: Sony Pictures Releasing (United States); EDKO (China and Hong Kong)
- Release dates: June 7, 2010 (Mann Village Theater); June 11, 2010 (United States); June 22, 2010 (China); August 5, 2010 (Hong Kong)
- Running time: 140 minutes
- Countries: China; Hong Kong; United States
- Language: English
- Budget: $40 million
- Box office: $359.1 million

The Karate Kid is a 2010 martial arts drama film directed by Harald Zwart from a screenplay by Christopher Murphey, based on a story by Robert Mark Kamen. It serves as the fifth film in The Karate Kid franchise. The film stars Jaden Smith and Jackie Chan in the lead roles, with Taraji P. Henson, Wenwen Han, Zhenwei Wang, Luke Carberry, Zhensu Wu, Zhiheng Wang, and Yu Rongguang in supporting roles. The story follows 12-year-old Dre Parker from Detroit, who moves to Beijing, China with his widowed mother Sherry and runs afoul of the neighborhood bully Cheng. He makes an unlikely ally in the form of an ageing maintenance man, Mr. Han, a kung fu master who teaches him the secrets of self-defense. It was the final film produced by Jerry Weintraub to be released during his lifetime, as he died in July 2015.

Principal photography of the film took place in Beijing, China, beginning in July 2009 and ending in October. The Karate Kid premiered at the Mann Village Theater in Westwood, California on June 7, 2010, and was released in the United States on June 11, by Sony Pictures Releasing through its Columbia Pictures label, and on June 22 in China and August 5 in Hong Kong, by EDKO. The film received generally positive reviews from critics and grossed $359.1 million worldwide on a $40 million budget, making it the highest-grossing film of the series.

The film serves as a remake of the 1984 film of the same name following a similar narrative but with the setting moved to China, and the martial art changed (despite the film's title) from karate to kung fu. The announcement of the sixth film, Karate Kid: Legends (2025), with Chan and original star Ralph Macchio reprising their roles, retconned the film as a standalone sequel, placing it in the same fictional universe of the original films.

== Plot ==
12-year-old Dre Parker and his widowed mother Sherry move from Detroit to Beijing after she gets a job transfer at a car factory. Dre meets young violinist Meiying, and immediately becomes infatuated with her. However, Cheng, a rebellious 14-year-old kung fu prodigy whose family is close to Meiying's, keeps them apart by constantly attacking, teasing, and antagonizing Dre. After a field trip to the Forbidden City, Dre throws a bucket of dirty water over Cheng and his gang as revenge for Cheng's rebellious behavior towards him, causing them to chase and brutally beat Dre. Maintenance man Mr. Han intervenes and fends off the bullies, revealing himself to be a kung fu master.

Han heals Dre's injuries using the Chinese medicine methods of fire cupping. He explains that Cheng and his friends are not inherently bad, but are taught to be merciless by their teacher Master Li. Dre asks Han to teach him kung fu, and Han accompanies him to Li's Fighting Dragons studio to make peace. Li rebuffs the peace offer and Han teaches Dre kung fu by emphasizing movements that apply to life in general. Serenity and maturity, not punches and power, are the keys to mastering kung fu. He has Dre repeatedly take off and pick up his jacket to develop muscle memory. Han takes him to a Taoist temple where Dre drinks the water from a Taoist well and witnesses a woman make a cobra reflect her movements. After weeks of training, Han gives Dre a day off. Dre persuades Meiying to skip school with him. After Meiying's parents find out, they deem Dre a bad influence and forbid Meiying from seeing him again.

Dre finds Han drunk and depressed, smashing a Volkswagen Scirocco he was working on. He explains that he crashed it years ago, killing his wife and his 10-year-old son. To punish himself, he spends a year fixing the car, then destroys it again on every anniversary of the accident. Dre resolves to train harder and help his teacher overcome his trauma. Han helps Dre write and recite an apology in Mandarin to Meiying's father. Meiying's father accepts Dre's apology and in return lets Meiying attend Dre's tournament as promised earlier on.

At the tournament, the initially unconfident Dre starts defeating his opponents. Li orders his student Liang to injure Dre in the semifinals. Liang reluctantly does so by delivering crippling blows to Dre's leg. He is disqualified and Dre advances to the finals against Cheng. Dre pleads with Han to heal his leg with the fire cupping method. Realizing this is more about overcoming Dre's fear than anything else, Han complies.

As the final match starts, on Li's orders, Cheng attacks Dre's injured leg, causing Dre to lose balance, but he manages to get up and uses the snake stance he saw at the temple. Dre defeats Cheng with a strong kick to the head, earning the respect of Cheng and his classmates. Cheng, instead of the presenter, presents Dre with the champion's trophy, and the Fighting Dragon students bow to Han out of respect for him as a real kung fu master, leaving Li outraged and defeated.

== Cast ==
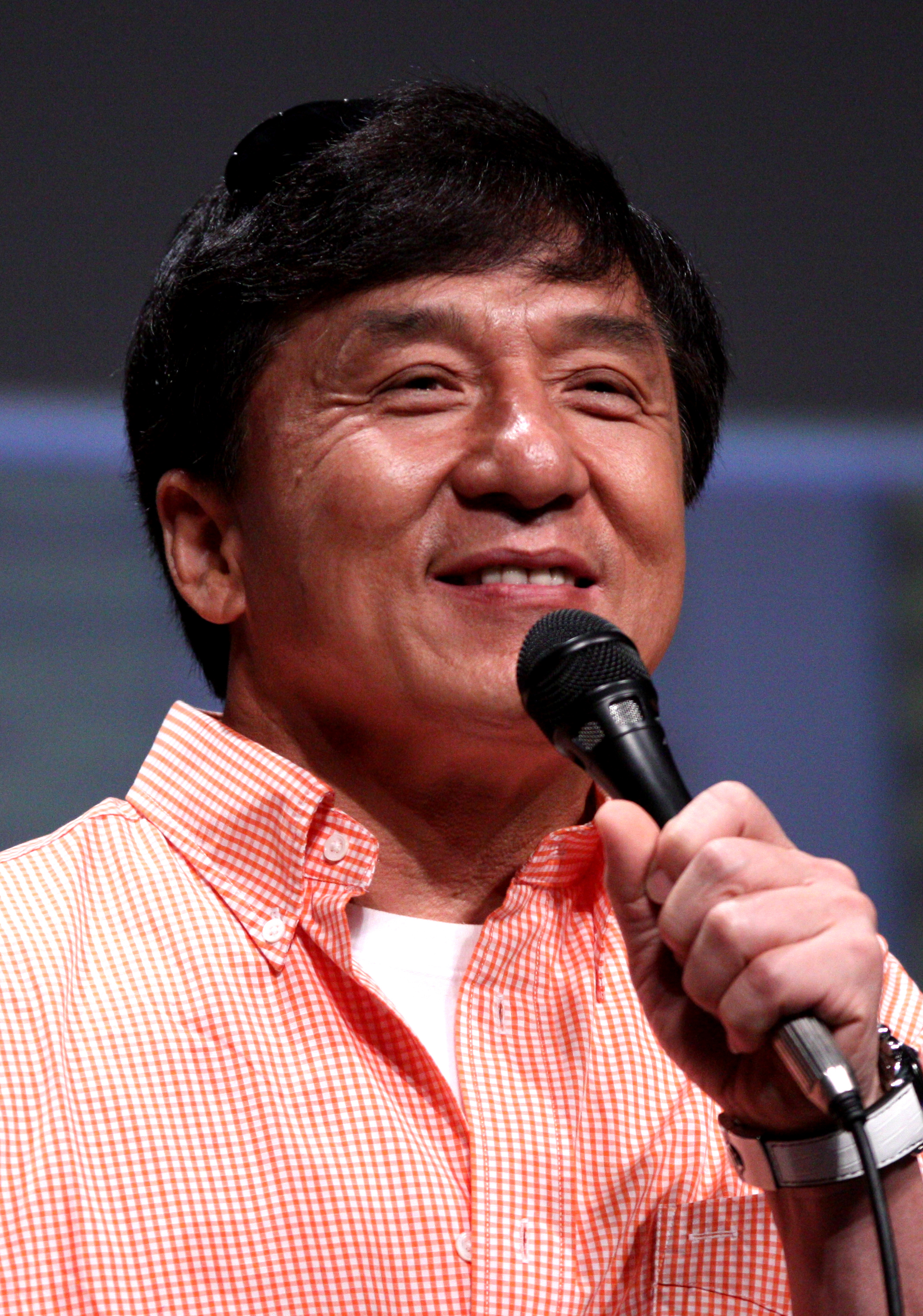
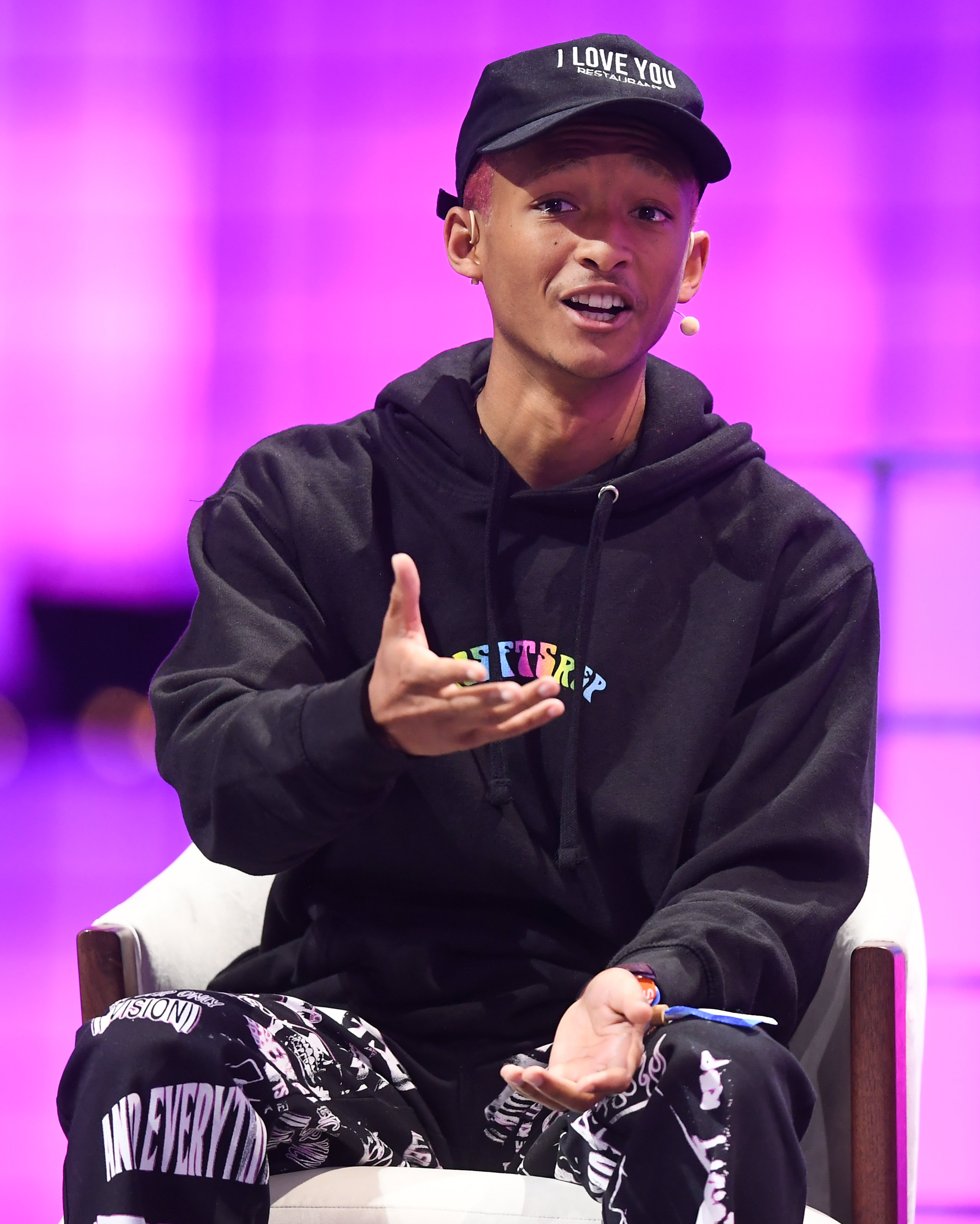
Lead actors Jackie Chan and Jaden Smith.
- Jackie Chan as Mr. Han (韩先生; 韓先生; Hán-xiānsheng), a Chinese maintenance man and kung fu master who becomes Dre's kung fu master. Based on Mr. Miyagi.
- Jaden Smith as Dre Parker (德瑞∙帕克; Déruì Pàkè). Based on Daniel LaRusso.
- Taraji P. Henson as Sherry Parker (雪莉∙帕克; Xuělì Pàkè), Dre's mother. Based on Lucille LaRusso.
- Wenwen Han (韩雯雯) as Meiying (美莹; Měiyíng), a violinist and Dre's love interest. Based on Ali Mills.
- Zhenwei Wang as Cheng (陆伟程; Lù Wěichéng) Based on Johnny Lawrence.
- Yu Rongguang as Master Li (李师傅 Lǐ-shīfu). Based on John Kreese.
- Luke Carberry as Harry (哈里; Hālǐ), a boy who befriends Dre. Based on Freddy Fernandez.
- Shijia Lü (吕世佳) as Liang (梁子浩; Liáng Zǐhào), a friend and classmate of Cheng's. Based on Bobby Brown.
- Ji Wang (王 姬) as Mrs. Po (博太太; Bó-tàitai), the principal of Dre's new school.
- Zhensu Wu (武振素) as Meiying's father. Based on Mr. Mills.
- Zhiheng Wang (王志恒) as Meiying's mother. Based on Mrs. Mills.
- Yi Zhao (赵 毅) as Zhuang (秦壮壮; Qín Zhuàngzhuàng), a friend and classmate of Cheng's. Based on Dutch.
- Zhang Bo (张 博) as Song (宋), a friend and classmate of Cheng's. Based on Tommy.
- Cameron Hillman as Mark (马克; Máke)
- Ghye Samuel Brown as Oz (奥兹)

== Production ==
=== Development ===
A remake of the Karate Kid entered the development in the late 2008. Variety reported at the time that the new film, to be produced by Will Smith, "has been refashioned as a star vehicle for Jaden Smith" and that it would "borrow elements from the original plot, wherein a bullied youth learns to stand up for himself with the help of an eccentric mentor". Jackie Chan told a Los Angeles Chinatown concert crowd in 2009 that he was leaving for Beijing to film the remake as Jaden Smith's teacher.

Despite maintaining the original title, the 2010 remake does not feature karate, which is from Okinawa (Japan), but focuses on the main character learning kung fu in China. Chan told interviewers that film cast members generally referred to the film as The Kung Fu Kid, and he believed the film would only be called The Karate Kid in America, and The Kung Fu Kid in China. This theory held true in the People's Republic of China, where the film is titled The Kung Fu Dream (Chinese: 功夫梦). In Japan and South Korea, the film is titled Best Kid (Japanese: ベスト・キッド; Korean: 베스트 키드) after the local title of the 1984 film in both countries.

Sony had considered changing the title of the film, but Jerry Weintraub, one of the producers, rejected the idea. Weintraub was also the producer of the original Karate Kid.

=== Filming ===
The Chinese government granted the filmmakers access to the Forbidden City, the Great Wall of China, and the Wudang Mountains. On some occasions, the filmmakers had to negotiate with residents who were not accustomed to filming activity. The film began filming in July 2009 and ended on October 16, 2009.

== Music ==
Icelandic composer Atli Örvarsson was originally hired to score the film, but he was replaced by American composer James Horner. The Karate Kid marked Horner's return to scoring after his work on the 2009 film Avatar. The score was released on June 15, 2010.

Justin Bieber and Jaden Smith recorded the film's official theme song, "Never Say Never", written by Adam Messinger, Bieber, Travis Garland, Omarr Rambert, and others, and produced by The Messengers (Adam Messinger and Nasri Atweh). The music video was released on May 31, 2010.

The film started with "Do You Remember" by Jay Sean featuring Sean Paul and Lil Jon. "Remember the Name" by Fort Minor was used in the trailer to promote the movie. Parts of the song, "Back in Black" by AC/DC and "Higher Ground" by the Red Hot Chili Peppers, were also used in the film. The song "Hip Song" by Rain is used for promotion in the Asian countries and it appeared in the trailer. The music video was released on May 22, 2010. "Bang Bang" by K'naan featuring Adam Levine and "Say" by John Mayer are also featured in the movie. It also features Lady Gaga's "Poker Face", Flo Rida's "Low" and Gorillaz' "Dirty Harry" (being performed in Chinese). An abbreviated form of Frédéric Chopin's Nocturne No. 20 is featured, arranged for strings, in Meiying's violin audition scene, along with Sergei Rachmaninoff's piano transcription of "Flight of the Bumblebee" by Rimsky-Korsakov.

== Release ==
The film premiered May 26, 2010, in Chicago, with appearances by Jackie Chan and Jaden Smith, and a brief surprise appearance from Will Smith.

In the mainland China version of the film, scenes of bullying were shortened by the censors, and a kissing scene is removed. John Horn of the Los Angeles Times said that the editing ultimately resulted in "two slightly different movies".

=== Home media ===
The Karate Kid was released on DVD and Blu-ray on October 5, 2010, by Sony Pictures Home Entertainment, and it was released on Mastered in 4K Blu-ray on May 14, 2013.

== Reception ==
=== Box office ===
The film was released on June 11, 2010, by Columbia Pictures to 3,663 theaters across the United States. The Karate Kid topped the box office on its opening day, grossing $18.8 million, and in its opening weekend, grossing $56 million in North America, beating The A-Team, which grossed an estimated $9.6 million on the same opening day, and $26 million in its opening weekend. It closed on September 18, after 101 days of release, grossing $176 million in the US and Canada along with an additional $182 million overseas for a worldwide total of $359 million, on a moderate budget of $40 million.

=== Critical response ===
Review aggregation website Rotten Tomatoes gives the film an approval rating of 67% based on 207 reviews, and an average rating of 6.17/10. The site's critics consensus reads: "It may not be as powerful as the 1984 edition, but the 2010 Karate Kid delivers a surprisingly satisfying update on the original". Metacritic, another review aggregator, assigned the film a weighted average score of 61 out of 100 based on 37 critics, indicating "generally favorable reviews". Audiences polled by CinemaScore gave the film an average grade of "A" on an A+ to F scale, the highest of the franchise.

Ann Hornaday described Jaden Smith as a "revelation", who "proves that he's no mere beneficiary of dynastic largesse. Somber, self-contained and somehow believable as a kid for whom things don't come easily, he never conveys the sense that he's desperate to be liked. Which is precisely why The Karate Kid winds up being so likable itself". Roger Ebert of the Chicago Sun-Times gave it a positive review, rating the film three and a half out of four stars, and calling it "a lovely and well-made film that stands on its own feet". Claudia Puig of USA Today and Owen Gleiberman of Entertainment Weekly each rated the film a 'B', stating "the chemistry between Jaden Smith and Jackie Chan grounds the movie, imbuing it with sincerity and poignance" and that the film is "fun and believable".

Simon Abrams of Slant Magazine gave the film one and a half stars and noted that "the characters just aren't old enough to be convincing in their hormone-driven need to prove themselves" and "this age gap is also a huge problem when it comes to the range that these kids bring to the project" and noted the portrayal of the child antagonist Cheng includes an "overblown and overused grimace, which looks like it might have originally belonged to Dolph Lundgren, looks especially silly on a kid that hasn't learned how to shave yet". Finally, Abrams noted: "What's most upsetting is Dre's budding romance with Meiying. These kids have yet to hit puberty and already they're swooning for each other".

=== Accolades ===
People's Choice Awards 2011

- Favorite Family Movie (Nominated)
- Favorite On-Screen Team – Jaden Smith & Jackie Chan (Nominated)
- Favorite Action Star – Jackie Chan (Won)

2011 Kids' Choice Awards

- Favorite Movie (Won)
- Favorite Buttkicker (Jackie Chan) (Won)
- Favorite Movie Actor (Jaden Smith) (Nominated)

2011 MTV Video Music Aid Japan

- Best Song from a Movie ("Never Say Never" by Justin Bieber featuring Jaden Smith) (Nominated)

2011 MTV Movie Awards

- Biggest Badass Star (Jaden Smith) (Nominated)

32nd Young Artist Awards

- Best Leading Young Actor in a Feature Film (Jaden Smith) (Won)

2010 Teen Choice Awards

- Choice Summer: Movie (Nominated)

== Sequel ==
Shortly after the film's release, a sequel was announced to be in development, with Smith, Chan, and Henson all reprising their roles. Breck Eisner was initially set to direct, but by June 2014, the film had gained new writers and lost Eisner as the director. In April 2017, Eisner returned as director, but in October, Chan stated that the initial script for the film did not work well.

In August 2023, it was reported that Chan would be reprising his role in Karate Kid: Legends. By November of the same year, Chan officially joined the cast alongside Ralph Macchio in their respective roles as Mr. Han and Daniel LaRusso. The studio announced a world-wide open casting call for an actor to star as the film's iteration of the titular character. Jonathan Entwistle directed the film with a script written by Rob Lieber, where the plot involves a teen from China moving to the United States and beginning to study martial arts. Karen Rosenfelt produced the film, with principal photography beginning in April 2024. Originally scheduled to be released on June 7, 2024, the film was delayed to December 13, 2024, in part as a result of the 2023 writers and actors strikes. It was delayed again to May 30, 2025, to avoid conflict with the sixth and final season of Cobra Kai.

== Video game ==
A mobile game based on the film was released for iOS devices by Sony Pictures on April 2, 2010.

== See also ==
- List of black films of the 2010s
