= The Karate Kid (franchise) =

American martial arts movie franchise

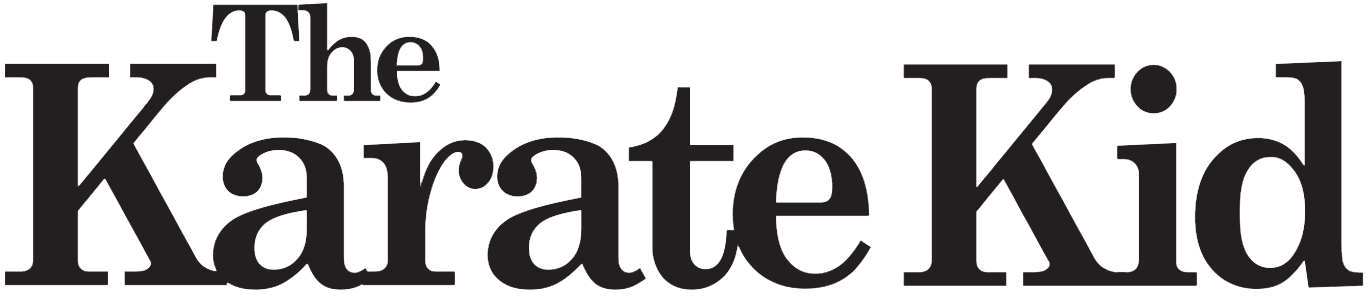
- Created by: Robert Mark Kamen
- Original work: The Karate Kid (1984)
- Owners: Columbia Pictures; Sony Pictures Television (Sony Pictures Entertainment)
- Years: 1984–present

Films and television
- Films: The Karate Kid (1984); The Karate Kid Part II (1986); The Karate Kid Part III (1989); The Next Karate Kid (1994); The Karate Kid (2010); Karate Kid: Legends (2025)
- Television series: Cobra Kai (2018–2025)
- Animated series: The Karate Kid (1989)

Games
- Video games: The Karate Kid Part II: The Computer Game (1986); The Karate Kid (1987); Cobra Kai: The Karate Kid Saga Continues (2020); Cobra Kai: Card Fighter (2021); Cobra Kai 2: Dojos Rising (2022)

Audio
- Soundtracks: The Karate Kid; The Karate Kid Part II; The Karate Kid Part III; The Next Karate Kid; The Karate Kid; Cobra Kai: Season 1; Cobra Kai: Season 2; Cobra Kai: Season 3; Cobra Kai: Season 4, Vol. 1; Cobra Kai: Season 4, Vol. 2

Miscellaneous
- Character(s): List of characters

The Karate Kid is an American martial arts drama franchise created by Robert Mark Kamen. The series follows the journey of various coming-of-age teenagers who are taught in the ways of martial arts by an experienced mentor in order to stand up for themselves after being bullied or assert their dominance towards others.

The original film series began as a trilogy, starting with the release of The Karate Kid (1984), after the success of which two direct sequels were produced: The Karate Kid Part II (1986) and The Karate Kid Part III (1989). In 1994, a standalone sequel with a new protagonist, The Next Karate Kid, was released. In 2010, a remake with a similar storyline but with a different set of characters, was released. Despite maintaining the original title, the film focused on kung fu, being set in China. A sixth film, Karate Kid: Legends, with Jackie Chan and Ralph Macchio reprising their original roles from the previous films, was released in 2025. This release retconned the 2010 film, placing it in the same fictional universe of the original films.

Cobra Kai (2018–2025) offers a continuation of the story that begins in the original films three decades later. While directly based on Kamen's characters, Josh Heald, Jon Hurwitz and Hayden Schlossberg created this series.

An animated series, as well as tie-in video games among other pieces of merchandise, have also been released alongside the films.

== Films ==
=== The Karate Kid (1984) ===
Daniel LaRusso and his mother have just moved to Reseda, Los Angeles from Newark, New Jersey at the start of the school year. Befriending classmate Ali Mills, he comes into conflict with Ali's ex-boyfriend and star pupil of the "Cobra Kai" dojo Johnny Lawrence and his gang. After being beaten up by the Cobra Kai gang in an after-school fight, Daniel finds an unlikely friend and karate sensei in his apartment complex's handyman, Mr. Miyagi, a proficient karate master. Making a deal with Johnny's merciless sensei, John Kreese, to end the fighting, Miyagi trains Daniel to compete at the All-Valley Karate Tournament.

=== The Karate Kid Part II (1986) ===
Immediately following the All-Valley Karate Tournament, Johnny is attacked by his furious sensei, John Kreese, in the parking lot. Mr. Miyagi intervenes, rescuing Johnny and passively humiliating Kreese in the process. Six months later, Miyagi receives a letter about his ailing father and plans to return to his home village on Okinawa Island. With Daniel in tow, Miyagi's past catches up with him as an old rivalry with a former friend is reignited.

=== The Karate Kid Part III (1989) ===
Six months after the 1984 All-Valley Karate Tournament, a down-and-out John Kreese visits his Vietnam War comrade, rich businessman Terry Silver. Silver sends Kreese on vacation to Tahiti, promising to re-establish the Cobra Kai dojo and get revenge on Daniel and Mr. Miyagi. Meanwhile, Daniel and Miyagi have returned home from Okinawa to find Daniel's apartment building being demolished and his mother back in New Jersey taking care of a sick relative; Miyagi invites Daniel to stay with him. When Miyagi refuses to train Daniel to defend his title at the tournament, Daniel happens across Silver who offers to train him Cobra Kai-style.

=== The Next Karate Kid (1994) ===
Mr. Miyagi (the only character from the previous films to return) travels to Boston, Massachusetts in order to attend a commemorative service for the Japanese-American soldiers who fought in the 442nd Infantry Regiment in World War II. While there, he reacquaints with Louisa Pierce, the widow of his commanding officer. Louisa introduces him to his rebellious teenage granddaughter Julie, whose anger issues – resulting from her parents' deaths – make life difficult for Louisa. Offering to help, Miyagi sends Louisa to his home in Los Angeles for respite while he works to mentor Julie. Julie initially rebuffs Miyagi's help, but warms to him after coming into conflict with the leader of her school's shady security fraternity, Ned.

=== The Karate Kid (2010) ===
In this remake of the 1984 film (later retconned, placing it in the same fictional universe of the original films), Dre Parker and his mother move from Detroit to Beijing after she transfers jobs from a car factory in the city. He befriends Meiying, a young musician who goes to his school, but draws the unwanted attention of Cheng, a kung fu prodigy whose family is close to Meiying's. Cheng and his friends relentlessly bully Dre at school to keep him away from Meiying, resulting in a fight on a school field trip where Dre is beaten up before being saved by his apartment building's maintenance man, Mr. Han. After failing to end the bullying by talking with Cheng and students's ruthless kung fu teacher Li, Mr. Han agrees to train Dre to compete at the upcoming open kung fu Tournament and defeat Cheng.

The film was originally said to be a Karate Kid film that the characters in the original films and in the Cobra Kai series would have watched, essentially a film made inside the Karate Kid universe instead of made about the said universe. The subsequent film Karate Kid Legends retconned this idea and tied it back into the main Karate Kid film series.

=== Karate Kid: Legends (2025) ===
A sequel to both the 2010 film and the original films, Mr. Han’s great-nephew and student Li Fong moves from Beijing to New York City with his mother after the death of his brother in a kung fu-related attack. Li befriends Mia Lipani, daughter of pizza shop owner and former local boxing champion Victor Lipani, bringing him into conflict with Mia’s ex-boyfriend Conor Day, a local karate champion. Li trains Victor in kung fu to aid him in a boxing match to pay off his debts, but following Victor's illegal defeat he decides to enter the Five Boroughs Karate Tournament with Mr. Han's encouragement. Mr. Han visits Daniel LaRusso and invites him to New York to train Li in both karate and kung fu for the Five Boroughs.

Film	U.S. release date	Director	Screenwriter	Story by	Producer(s)
The Karate Kid	June 22, 1984	John G. Avildsen	Robert Mark Kamen	Robert Mark Kamen	Jerry Weintraub
The Karate Kid Part II	June 20, 1986	John G. Avildsen	Robert Mark Kamen	Robert Mark Kamen	Jerry Weintraub
The Karate Kid Part III	June 30, 1989	John G. Avildsen	Robert Mark Kamen	Robert Mark Kamen	Jerry Weintraub
The Next Karate Kid	September 9, 1994	Christopher Cain	Mark Lee	Mark Lee	Jerry Weintraub
The Karate Kid	June 11, 2010	Harald Zwart	Christopher Murphey	Robert Mark Kamen	Will Smith, Ken Stovitz, James Lassiter, Jerry Weintraub & Jada Pinkett Smith
Karate Kid: Legends	May 30, 2025	Jonathan Entwistle	Rob Lieber	Rob Lieber	Karen Rosenfelt

== Television series ==
Series	Season	Episodes		Originally released			Showrunner(s)
Series	Season	Episodes		First released	Last released	Network	Showrunner(s)
The Karate Kid	1	13		September 9, 1989	December 16, 1989	NBC	Larry Houston
Cobra Kai	1	10		May 2, 2018		YouTube Red	Josh Heald, Jon Hurwitz & Hayden Schlossberg
Cobra Kai	2	10		April 24, 2019		YouTube Premium	Josh Heald, Jon Hurwitz & Hayden Schlossberg
Cobra Kai	3	10		January 1, 2021		Netflix	Josh Heald, Jon Hurwitz & Hayden Schlossberg
Cobra Kai	4	10		December 31, 2021		Netflix	Josh Heald, Jon Hurwitz & Hayden Schlossberg
Cobra Kai	5	10		September 9, 2022		Netflix	Josh Heald, Jon Hurwitz & Hayden Schlossberg
Cobra Kai	6	15	5	July 18, 2024		Netflix	Josh Heald, Jon Hurwitz & Hayden Schlossberg
Cobra Kai	6	15	5	November 15, 2024		Netflix	Josh Heald, Jon Hurwitz & Hayden Schlossberg
Cobra Kai	6	15	5	February 13, 2025		Netflix	Josh Heald, Jon Hurwitz & Hayden Schlossberg

=== The Karate Kid (1989) ===
In this animated children's television series, a miniature shrine with mystical properties has been stolen from its resting place in Okinawa. Joined by Taki Tamurai, Daniel and Mr. Miyagi are tasked with locating it and returning it home, traveling the globe on a series of adventures. The characters were not voiced by the original film actors, although Pat Morita voiced the opening narration.

With regard to Cobra Kai, executive producer and co-creator Jon Hurwitz revealed the animated series is not canon, however the shrine from the series appeared as an easter egg in Chozen Toguchi's Okinawa dojo during the third season of Cobra Kai.

=== Cobra Kai (2018–2025) ===
34 years after the 1984 All-Valley Karate Tournament, a down-and-out Johnny Lawrence, now in his 50s, has just lost his job. After getting arrested for rescuing his teenage neighbor Miguel Diaz from a group of bullies, then getting cut-loose and disowned by his stepfather, Johnny agrees to teach Miguel karate and reopens the Cobra Kai dojo, attracting social outcasts who build their self-confidence under his unorthodox tutelage. Meanwhile, Daniel LaRusso owns a successful chain of car dealerships and is happily married to his wife Amanda but struggles to keep a balanced life without the guidance of his now-deceased mentor, Mr. Miyagi. Johnny's estranged and troubled son, Robby Keene, hoping to get back at his father, comes under Daniel's wing – initially not knowing Robby's parentage – giving Robby a job at his car dealership and teaching him Miyagi-Do karate. Daniel and Johnny come into conflict after Cobra Kai's return is made public, while Daniel's daughter Samantha gets caught in the middle.

According to Josh Heald, Jon Hurwitz, and Hayden Schlossberg, the only characters that they would explore in the series were ones who featured in the first four films. The creatives stated that they internally reference these characters as a part of the "Miyagi-verse", and explained that they are those who interacted directly with Mr. Miyagi.

== Cast and characters ==
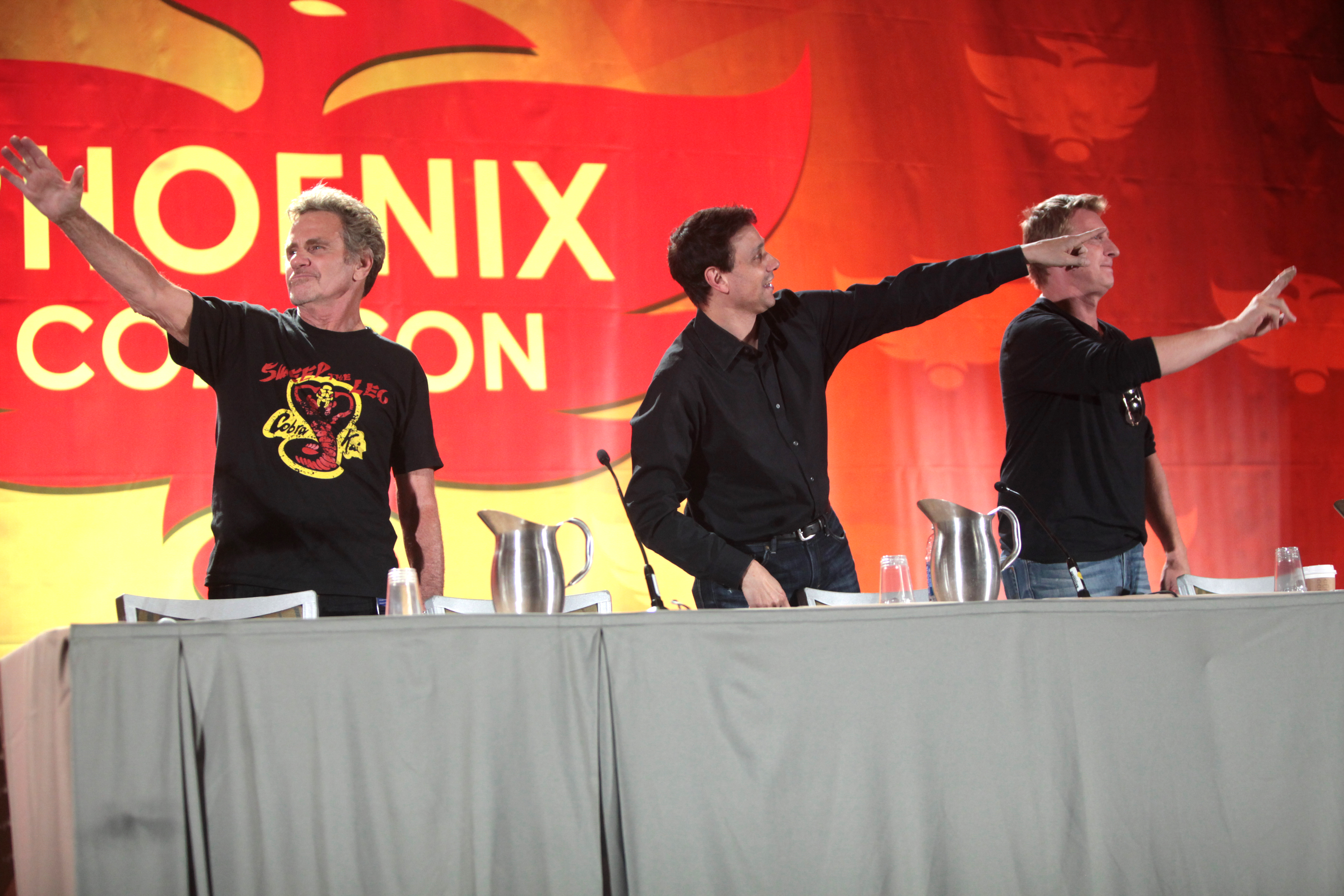
Martin Kove, Ralph Macchio & William Zabka (2016)

List indicators

This section includes characters who will appear or have appeared in the franchise.

- An empty grey cell indicates the character was not in the film, or that the character's official presence has not yet been confirmed.
- ^{A} indicates an appearance through archival footage or audio.
- ^{C} indicates a cameo role.
- ^{S} indicates an appearance through use of special effects.
- ^{U} indicates an uncredited appearance.
- ^{V} indicates a voice-only role.
- ^{Y} indicates a younger version of the character.
- ^{F} indicates a performer stood in as a character's body-double for fight sequences.

Character	Films						Television series		Video games		Broadway
Character	The Karate Kid	The Karate Kid Part II	The Karate Kid Part III	The Next Karate Kid	The Karate Kid	Karate Kid: Legends	The Karate Kid	Cobra Kai	Cobra Kai: The Karate Kid Saga Continues	Cobra Kai 2: Dojo's Rising	The Karate Kid The Musical
Principal cast
Daniel LaRusso	Ralph Macchio	Ralph Macchio	Ralph Macchio			Ralph Macchio	Joey Dedio^{V}	Ralph Macchio	Ralph Macchio^{V}	Ralph Macchio^{V}	John Cardoza
Mr. Miyagi	Noriyuki "Pat" Morita Fumio Demura^{F}	Noriyuki "Pat" Morita	Noriyuki "Pat" Morita Fumio Demura^{F}	Noriyuki "Pat" Morita Fumio Demura^{F}		Noriyuki "Pat" Morita^{A}	Robert Ito^{V}	Brian Takahashi^{Y}^{V} Noriyuki "Pat" Morita^{S}			Jovanni Sy
John Kreese	Martin Kove	Martin Kove	Martin Kove					Martin Kove Barrett Carnahan^{Y}	Brent Mukai^{V}	Martin Kove^{V}	Alan H. Green
John "Johnny" Lawrence	William Zabka	William Zabka	William Zabka^{A}			William Zabka^{C}		William Zabka Owen Stone^{Y} Thomas Parobek^{Y} Logan Coffey^{Y}	William Zabka^{V}	William Zabka^{V}	Jake Bentley Young
Ali Mills	Elisabeth Shue	Elisabeth Shue^{A}	Elisabeth Shue^{A}					Elisabeth Shue		Jessica Rau^{V}	Jetta Juriansz
Chozen Toguchi		Yuji Okumoto						Yuji Okumoto Shigi Ohtsu^{Y}		Yuji Okumoto^{V}	
Sato Toguchi		Danny Kamekona						Akihiro Kitamura^{Y} Danny Kamekona^{A}			
Kumiko		Tamlyn Tomita						Tamlyn Tomita			
Terrence "Terry" Silver			Thomas Ian Griffith					Thomas Ian Griffith Nick Marini^{Y}		Thomas Ian Griffith^{V}	
Michael "Mike" Barnes			Sean Kanan					Sean Kanan			
Jessica Andrews			Robyn Lively					Robyn Lively			
Julie Pierce				Hilary Swank							
Eric McGowen				Chris Conrad							
Ned				Michael Cavalieri							
Dre Parker					Jaden Smith						
Mr. Han					Jackie Chan	Jackie Chan					
Cheng					Zhenwei Wang						
Meiying					Wenwen Han						
Li Fong						Ben Wang					
Li Fong						Marco Zhang^{Y}					
Mia Lapaini						Sadie Stanley					
Victor Lapaini						Joshua Jackson					
Conor Day						Aramis Knight					
Miguel Diaz								Xolo Maridueña	Joe Zieja^{V}	Xolo Maridueña^{V}	
Samantha "Sam" LaRusso								Mary Mouser Reese TinLee^{Y}	Valerie Rose Lohman^{V}	Mary Mouser^{V}	
Robert "Robby" Keene								Tanner Buchanan	Spencer Greene^{V}	Spencer Greene^{V}	
Tory Nichols								Peyton List Charlotte Ann Tucker^{Y}	Jessica Rau^{V}	Peyton List^{V}	
Eli "Hawk" Moskowitz								Jacob Bertrand	Jacob Bertrand^{V}	Jacob Bertrand^{V}	
Demetri Alexopoulos								Gianni Decenzo	Gianni Decenzo^{V}	Gianni Decenzo^{V}	
Supporting cast
Lucille LaRusso	Randee Heller	Randee Heller^{A}	Randee Heller					Randee Heller			Kate Baldwin
Bobby Brown	Ron Thomas	Ron Thomas	Ron Thomas^{A}					Ron Thomas		Brent Mukai^{V}	
Tommy	Rob Garrison	Rob Garrison	Rob Garrison^{A}					Rob Garrison			
Dutch	Chad McQueen	Chad McQueen	Chad McQueen^{A}					Chad McQueen^{A}			
Jimmy	Tony O'Dell	Tony O'Dell	Tony O'Dell^{A}					Tony O'Dell			
Mrs. Mills	Sharon Spelman							Deborah May			
Freddy Fernandez	Israel Juarbe							Israel Jurabe^{A}			Luis-Pablo Garcia
Mrs. Milo	Frances Bay		Frances Bay^{C}					Frances Bay^{A}			
Head Referee	Pat E. Johnson	Pat E. Johnson	Pat E. Johnson					Pat E. Johnson^{A}			
Yukie		Nobu McCarthy						Nobu McCarthy^{A}			
Yuna		Traci Toguchi						Traci Toguchi			
Miyagi's father		Charlie Tanimoto									
Snake			Jonathan Avildsen					Jonathan Avildsen^{A}			
Dennis De Guzman			Christopher Paul Ford					Christopher Paul Ford			
Colonel Dugan				Michael Ironside							
Angel				Frank Welker^{V}							
Louisa Pierce				Constance Towers							
Charlie				Walton Goggins							
Principal Harold Wilkes				Eugene Boles							
Sherry Parker					Taraji P. Henson						
Master Li					Rongguang Yu						
Harry					Luke Carberry						
Dr. Fong						Ming-Na Wen					
Alan						Wyatt Oleff					
O'Shea						Tim Rozon					
Taki Tamurai							Janice Kawaye^{V}				
Carmen Diaz								Vanessa Rubio	Appeared	Jessica Rau^{V}	
Amanda Steiner-LaRusso								Courtney Henggeler	Valerie Rose Lohman^{V}	Valerie Rose Lohman^{V}	
Kenny Payne								Dallas Dupree Young		Zeno Robinson^{V}	

== Production ==
=== Development ===
The Karate Kid is a semi-autobiographical story based on the life of its screenwriter, Robert Mark Kamen. At age 17, after the 1964 New York World's Fair, Kamen was beaten up by a gang of bullies. He thus began to study martial arts in order to defend himself. Kamen was unhappy with his first teacher, who taught martial arts as a tool for violence and revenge. He moved on to study Okinawan Gōjū-ryū karate under a Japanese teacher who did not speak English, but was himself a student of Chōjun Miyagi.

As a Hollywood screenwriter, Kamen was mentored by Frank Price who told him that producer Jerry Weintraub had optioned a news article about the young child of a single mother who had earned a black belt to defend himself against the neighborhood bullies. Kamen then combined his own life story with the news article and used both to create the screenplay for The Karate Kid. Additionally, given John G. Avildsen's involvement with both films, Sylvester Stallone often joked with Kamen that the writer had "ripped off" the Rocky films with The Karate Kid.

DC Comics had a character called Karate Kid, who was created in 1966. The filmmakers received special permission from DC Comics in 1984 to use the title for the first film and subsequent sequels.

A number of actors were considered for the part of Daniel LaRusso (originally Daniel Weber), including Sean Penn, Robert Downey Jr., Charlie Sheen, Jon Cryer, Emilio Estevez, Nicolas Cage, Anthony Edwards, C. Thomas Howell, Tom Cruise, Eric Stoltz, and D. B. Sweeney. Ralph Macchio was ultimately cast on the strength of his performance as Johnny Cade in The Outsiders (1983). Macchio has stated that his performance as Johnny influenced the development of Daniel LaRusso in The Karate Kid.

The studio originally wanted the role of Mr. Miyagi to be played by Toshiro Mifune, who had appeared in the Akira Kurosawa films Rashomon (1950), Seven Samurai (1954), and The Hidden Fortress (1958), but Mifune did not speak English. Pat Morita later auditioned for the role, but was rejected for the part due to his close association with stand-up comedy and with his character Arnold on the sitcom Happy Days. After a few failed attempts, Morita grew a beard and patterned his accent after his uncle, which led to him being cast in the role.

=== Abandoned projects ===
In a 2020 interview with Collider, William Zabka revealed that Pat Morita pitched him an idea in 2005, for a fifth film. The plot would have revolved around Johnny Lawrence who is now a doctor and tasked with caregiving for Mr. Miyagi; who is in the final stages of his life and whose health is failing him. During the early days of development, Morita died and the project was abandoned.

In January 2022, Ralph Macchio revealed that he had previously been approached in 2012 about the potential for a The Karate Kid and Rocky crossover film. Intended to be directed by John G. Avildsen, the plot would have involved Daniel LaRusso's daughter and Rocky Balboa, Jr. opening a dojo together. Macchio stated that he and Milo Ventimiglia were pitched the idea, but described the concept as "awful". After Macchio expressed his disinterest in the story, the project subsequently fell into development hell before being abandoned in favor of Creed and Cobra Kai.

== Additional production and crew details ==
Film / Television	Crew/Detail					
Film / Television	Composer	Cinematographer	Editor(s)	Production companies	Distributing companies	Running time
The Karate Kid (1984)	Bill Conti	James Crabe	John G. Avildsen, Walt Mulconery & Bud S. Smith	Columbia Pictures, Jerry Weintraub Productions, Delphi II Productions	Columbia Pictures	2 hrs 7 mins
The Karate Kid Part II	Bill Conti	James Crabe	John G. Avildsen, David Garfield & Jane Kurson	Columbia Pictures, Delphi V Productions	Columbia Pictures	1 hr 53 mins
The Karate Kid Part III	Bill Conti	Steve Yaconelli	John G. Avildsen & John Carter	Columbia Pictures, Weintraub International Group	Columbia Pictures	1 hr 51 mins
The Karate Kid (TV series)	Shuki Levy & Haim Saban	Art direction: Victor Dal Chele & Russ Heath	Karen Rosenbloom & Donald P. Zappala	Columbia Pictures Television, Saban Entertainment, DiC Entertainment	National Broadcasting Company (NBC)	6 hrs 30 mins (30 mins/episode)
The Next Karate Kid	Bill Conti	László Kovács	Ronald Roose	Columbia Pictures, Jerry Weintraub Productions	Columbia Pictures	1 hr 47 mins
The Karate Kid (2010)	James Horner	Roger Pratt	Joel Negron	Columbia Pictures, JW Productions, Overbrook Entertainment, China Film Group Corporation, Emperor Film Productions	Sony Pictures Releasing	2 hrs 20 mins
Cobra Kai	Leo Birenberg & Zach Robinson	Cameron Duncan	Nicholas Monsour, Jeff Seibenick & Ivan Victor	Sony Pictures Television Studios, Hurwitz & Schlossberg Productions, Overbrook Entertainment, Heald Productions, Counterbalance Entertainment, YouTube Red Originals, YouTube Premium Originals, Netflix Originals	YouTube Red (Note: YouTube Red was the original distributor for season 1 of Cobra Kai.) YouTube Premium (Note: YouTube Premium was the original distributor for season 2 of Cobra Kai.) Netflix	25 hrs (30 mins/episode)
Karate Kid: Legends	Dominic Lewis	Justin Brown	Dana E. Glauberman	Columbia Pictures, Sunswept Entertainment	Sony Pictures Releasing	1 hr 34 mins

== Reception ==
=== Box office performance ===
The franchise as a whole has been a box office success.

Film	Release date	Box office gross				Budget	Ref
Film	Release date	United States and Canada	North American gross when adjusted for inflation	Other territories	Worldwide	Budget	Ref
The Karate Kid (1984)	June 22, 1984	$100,400,529 (Note: $100 million up until 1985. 2018 and 2019 re-releases grossed $400,529.)	$311,138,731	?	$300,442,786 (Note: The original trilogy grossed $300 million worldwide up until 1994. Between 2018 and 2020, the original film grossed a further $400,529 in the United States and Canada, and $42,257 in the United Kingdom and Australia.)	$8 million	
The Karate Kid Part II	June 20, 1986	$115,103,979	$338,078,627	?	$300,442,786	$13 million	
The Karate Kid Part III	June 30, 1989	$38,956,288	$101,181,768	?	$300,442,786	$12.5 million	
The Next Karate Kid	September 9, 1994	$8,914,777	$19,364,721	$7,100,000	$16,014,777	$12 million	
The Karate Kid (2010)	June 11, 2010	$176,591,618	$260,723,929	$182,534,404	$359,126,022	$40 million	
Karate Kid: Legends	May 30, 2025	$51,698,169	$51,698,169	$50,800,000	$102,498,169	$45 million	
Total		$491,665,360	$1,117,499,026	$238,434,404	$778,081,754	$130.5 million	
List indicator: A dark gray cell indicates the information is not available for the film.

=== Critical and public response ===
Except for the 1984 and 2010 films, the other films in the franchise received mixed or negative reviews. Cobra Kai received a consistently positive reception.

Film/Television	Rotten Tomatoes	Metacritic	CinemaScore
The Karate Kid (1984)	81% (97 reviews)	61 (15 reviews)	A
The Karate Kid Part II	48% (73 reviews)	55 (9 reviews)	A–
The Karate Kid Part III	18% (61 reviews)	36 (12 reviews)	B–
The Next Karate Kid	20% (51 reviews)	36 (15 reviews)	B+
The Karate Kid (2010)	67% (207 reviews)	61 (37 reviews)	A
Cobra Kai: Season 1	100% (50 reviews)	72 (11 reviews)	—N/a
Cobra Kai: Season 2	91% (32 reviews)	66 (7 reviews)	—N/a
Cobra Kai: Season 3	90% (52 reviews)	72 (15 reviews)	—N/a
Cobra Kai: Season 4	95% (41 reviews)	70 (8 reviews)	—N/a
Cobra Kai: Season 5	98% (48 reviews)	80 (4 reviews)	—N/a
Cobra Kai: Season 6	91% (44 reviews)	67 (11 reviews)	—N/a
Karate Kid: Legends	59% (172 reviews)	51 (36 reviews)	A–

=== Cultural influence ===
The series has been credited for popularizing Karate in the United States.

== In other media ==
=== Broadway ===
In January 2020, a Broadway musical adaptation of The Karate Kid was revealed to be in development. Amon Miyamoto serves as director, with an accompanying novel being written by the original film's screenwriter Robert Mark Kamen. Drew Gasparini serves as the lyricist and composer of the score, while Keone & Mari Madrid choreograph the play. Kumiko Yoshii, Michael Wolk serve as producers, with The Kinoshita Group. The cast includes Jovanni Sy as Mr. Miyagi, John Cardoza as Daniel LaRusso, Kate Baldwin as Lucille LaRusso, Alan H. Green as John Kreese, Jake Bentley Young as Johnny Lawrence, Jetta Juriansz as Ali Mills and Luis-Pablo Garcia as Freddie Fernandez. The musical debuted in St. Louis in June 2022, receiving mixed-to-positive reviews, and has since toured the United Kingdom and Toronto.

=== Merchandise ===
The film spawned a franchise of related items and memorabilia such as action figures, head bands, posters, and T-shirts. A novelization was written by B. B. Hiller and published in 1984. The novel had a scene that was in the rehearsal when Daniel encounters Johnny during school at lunch. Also at the end, there was a battle between Miyagi and Kreese in the parking lot after the tournament which was the original ending for the film and used as the beginning of The Karate Kid Part II. Hiller would also write novelizations for the second and third films. A storybook based on the second film, written by Christopher Brown, was also released. On May 7, 2019, The Karate Kid: The Classic Illustrated Storybook was published by Quirk Books under their Pop Classics series. It retold the events of the first film with art by Kim Smith.

In 2015, toy company Funko revived The Karate Kid action figures. Two versions of character Daniel Larusso, a version of character Johnny Lawrence and a version of Mr. Miyagi were part of the line. The toys were spotted at retailers Target and Amazon.com.

In 2021 and 2022, the toy company Playmates Toys released a series of crossover Teenage Mutant Ninja Turtles Vs. Cobra Kai two packs which featured two action figures, one character from each respective franchise, in opposition to each other.

In 2023, the toy company Hasbro released a series of Power Rangers X Cobra Kai crossover action figures that tied characters of both franchises together. Cobra Kai characters like Daniel Larusso and Johnny Lawrence wore ninja outfits similar to the Ninjetti/Ninja Mode costumes from Mighty Morphin Power Rangers' 1995 film and third season, while Putty Patrollers wore skeleton Halloween costumes like those worn by the Cobra Kai gang as seen in the first Karate Kid film.

In 2023, Asmodee released the board game Cobra Kai: Road to Victory.

=== Video games ===
A video game loosely based on the first two films was developed by Atlus and published by LJN for the Nintendo Entertainment System in 1987. A video game based on the second film, titled The Karate Kid Part II: The Computer Game, was released in 1986.

A mobile game based on the 2010 film was released for iOS devices by Sony Pictures on April 2, 2010.

Cobra Kai: The Karate Kid Saga Continues, a video game based on the television series Cobra Kai, was released for PlayStation 4, Xbox One, and Nintendo Switch in October 2020, while Microsoft Windows version was released in January 2021.

A mobile game entitled Cobra Kai: Card Fighter was released on iOS and Android devices in March 2021.

A sequel to Cobra Kai: The Karate Kid Saga Continues developed by Flux Games and published by GameMill Entertainment titled Cobra Kai 2: Dojos Rising was released on November 8, 2022, for Nintendo Switch, PlayStation 4, PlayStation 5, Windows via Steam, Xbox One, and Xbox Series X/S.

Characters and elements from Cobra Kai have appeared in the Roblox experience Netflix Nextworld.

On September 20, 2024, a 2D sprite-art-based beat 'em up game based on the original film trilogy, titled The Karate Kid: Street Rumble, was released for PlayStation 4, PlayStation 5, Xbox Series X/S, Nintendo Switch and Windows via Steam.

=== Comic book ===
A 4-issue comic book miniseries entitled Cobra Kai: The Karate Kid Saga Continues - Johnny's Story was published by IDW Publishing and released between October 2019 and January 2020, and was subsequently collected in trade paperback on July 8, 2020. It was written by Denton J. Tipton, with art by Kagan McLeod and colors by Luis Antonio Delgado.

=== Books ===
In 2022, Ralph Macchio published the memoir Waxing On: The Karate Kid and Me (Dutton), in which he reflects upon the making of and legacy of the Karate Kid films and Cobra Kai. Also in 2022, the behind-the-scenes book The Kick-A** Book of Cobra Kai was written by Rachel Bertsche and published by HarperCollins.
