= Cobra Kai: The Karate Kid Saga Continues =

2020 video game based on TV series Cobra Kai

- Developer: Flux Games
- Publishers: NA: GameMill Entertainment; EU: Maximum Games
- Series: The Karate Kid
- Engine: Unity
- Platforms: Nintendo Switch; PlayStation 4 Xbox One; Windows
- Release: PlayStation 4, Xbox One: WW: October 27, 2020; Nintendo Switch: NA: October 27, 2020; EU: November 24, 2020; Windows: WW: January 5, 2021
- Genre: Beat 'em-up
- Modes: Single-player, multiplayer

Cobra Kai: The Karate Kid Saga Continues is a 2020 side-scrolling beat 'em-up game based on the American television series Cobra Kai, which in turn is based on the film franchise The Karate Kid. Developed by Flux Games and published by GameMill Entertainment in North America and Maximum Games in Europe, it was released for Nintendo Switch, PlayStation 4, and Xbox One on October 27, 2020, and for Windows on January 5, 2021. The Nintendo Switch version was released in Europe on November 24, 2020. Ralph Macchio, William Zabka, Jacob Bertrand, and Gianni DeCenzo reprise their roles as Daniel LaRusso, Johnny Lawrence, Eli "Hawk" Moskowitz, and Demetri Alexopoulos respectively, while the rest of the other characters are voiced by different actors.

A sequel developed by Flux Games and published by GameMill Entertainment titled Cobra Kai 2: Dojos Rising was released on November 8, 2022 for Nintendo Switch, PlayStation 4, PlayStation 5, Windows via Steam, Xbox One, and Xbox Series X/S.

== Plot ==
Hawk and Demetri are in the principal's office for the complete chaos that happened all over the valley, while arguing over who's telling the truth over how it all started. The principal tells them that they're both going to get suspended unless they can make their story make sense, and to tell it all the way from the beginning.

=== Cobra Kai Story ===
Hawk starts his story by saying that it all started at the Mini-Golf & Arcade where Miguel got a note and thought it was from Sam telling him to meet her for a date, but it turned out to be a gang of thugs. After Miguel beat up the thugs, they drive away and a map flies out of their car, which Miguel shows to Johnny. Johnny and Miguel conclude that it might be Daniel trying to get revenge for his trauma in high school. They go to Smitty's Diner where they find Kyler. He was following instructions from an unidentified martial artist, saying to come to the diner if he wants revenge on Miguel. Their next destination is the mall because Miyagi-Do was using it as their next meeting spot where they might be preparing another trap, so they go to investigate. They defeat Demetri and a thug named Shawn. Afterwards, a mall cop shows up and captures Shawn, but everyone else manages to escape. They later head to the All-Valley Tournament campus after receiving a falsified tournament invitation. Upon arrival, Cobra Kai defeats Xander and Robby. Their next destination is Weinberg TV Studios where they find Johnny's stepfather, Sid. They learn that he partnered up with Miyagi-Do to make a movie. They then go to the high school, where they defeat Sam.

Their next destination is Oaks on the Beach Club, where they find Trey and get information that he was under instructions by the same martial artist to pass out falsified tournament fliers. Cobra Kai's next destination is the Beach Bonfire where they find Yasmine, who is upset at Cobra Kai for showing up at her party uninvited. They find out that the same martial artist had the All Valley Tournament sponsor her party and only requested for her to appear, prompting them to conclude that Miyagi-do is behind it. The next place they go to is 5th Avenue Bar, where they find Armand and get information on what he's up to with Miyagi-Do, but he tells them that he came to the bar for a business meeting with a buyer to tell him that he wanted to buy the strip mall because he had plans for true karate, but he missed his deal and blames Cobra Kai for it. Cobra Kai heads to the Valley Fest, concluding Daniel was the mastermind and promptly defeats him.

Hawk closes the story by telling the principal that there was an anonymous tip that said that Daniel was the one behind it all because he couldn't get over his traumas from high school, but Cobra Kai put an end to him and Miyagi-Do. Kreese became the president of the All Valley Karate Committee and helped Johnny get back on track and let him run the dojo as long as he agreed to abide by Kreese's rules in showing no mercy, a claim which Demetri objects to.

=== Miyagi-Do Story ===
Demetri starts his story by saying that it all started at the Mini-Golf & Arcade where Sam got a note and thought it was from Miguel telling her to meet him for a date, but it turned out to be a gang of thugs. After Sam beat up the thugs, they drive away and a map flies out of their car, which Sam shows to Daniel. Daniel and Sam conclude that it might be Johnny trying to get revenge for losing to Daniel in the tournament. They go to Smitty's Diner where they find Kyler. He was following instructions from an unidentified martial artist, saying to come to the diner if he wants to get back with Sam. They go to LaRusso Auto where they meet dealership rival Tom Cole, learning that was bribed by a local martial artist to trash the dealership and relocate the cars. Their next destination is the mall because Cobra Kai was using it as their next meeting spot where they might be preparing another trap, so they go to investigate. They defeat Hawk and a thug named Shawn. Afterwards, a mall cop shows up and captures Shawn, but everyone else manages to escape. They later head to the All-Valley Tournament campus after receiving a falsified tournament invitation. Upon arrival, Miyagi-Do defeats Xander and Miguel. Their next destination is Weinberg TV Studios where they find Johnny's stepfather, Sid. They learn that he partnered up with Cobra Kai to make a movie. They then go to the high school, where they defeat Tory.

Their next destination is Oaks on the Beach Club, where they find Trey and get information that he was under instructions by the same martial artist to pass out falsified tournament fliers. Miyagi-Do's next destination is the Beach Bonfire where they find Yasmine, who is upset at Miyagi-Do for showing up at her party uninvited. They find out that the same martial artist had the All Valley Tournament sponsor her party and only requested for her to appear, prompting them to conclude that Cobra Kai is behind it. The next place they go to is 5th Avenue Bar, where they find Armand and get information on what he's up to with Cobra Kai, but he tells them that he came to the bar for a business meeting with a buyer to tell him that he wanted to buy the strip mall because he had plans for true karate, but he missed his deal and blames Miyagi-Do for it. Miyagi-Do heads to the Valley Fest, concluding Johnny was the mastermind and promptly defeat him.

Demetri closes the story by telling the principal that there was an anonymous tip that said that Johnny was behind it all because he couldn't get over losing the tournament to Daniel. With Johnny apparently ousted, Cobra Kai turned into something else with Kreese as president of the All Valley Karate Committee with new rules for the tournament. Miyagi-Do stood its ground as one of the valley's best dojos, a claim which Hawk objects to.

=== True Ending ===
Daniel and Johnny blame each other for starting this whole mess until Kreese shows up and admits that he was the one who caused the mess and pitted Daniel and Johnny against each other. They decide to team up and fight Kreese together. After they beat Kreese up, Johnny puts him in a head lock with Kreese asking him if he would really do that to his sensei and tells Johnny that he always rooted for him, but Johnny didn't believe Kreese because he only cares about himself. As Johnny plans to finish off Kreese, Daniel tells him not to do it because that would make him no better, so Johnny decides to let Kreese go and they tell him to leave and never come back. Daniel and Johnny were both surprised at how Kreese used their history to turn them against each other like that and surprised that Kreese is still as evil as he always was. Daniel and Johnny decide to call a truce and make sure that this doesn't happen again. The principal doesn't believe one word that Hawk and Demetri are saying. They tell him that it's all true, but the principal tells them that everything's a mess and their best explanation being a retired mastermind veteran with a penchant for chaos sounds more like something out of a book. They keep telling him that it really happened, so he decides to give them detention where they can write their tale on paper. He jokingly says that their delusion would make a good TV show or a video game.

== Development ==
The game was announced in August 2020. A trailer for the game was released in the same month. The game was in the middle of its alpha phase when the COVID-19 pandemic was declared and forced the developers to begin working remotely. The developers have cited games that served as inspiration, including Teenage Mutant Ninja Turtles: Turtles in Time and The Combatribes for combat mechanics, Overwatch and Assassin's Creed Odyssey for skill upgrades, and Streets of Rage, River City Girls and Final Fight for level pacing and enemy design. The dodge move was also added late in development as the parry system was very badly rated by testers. The game features an entirely original soundtrack from the composers of the TV series, Leo Birenberg and Zach Robinson. An official soundtrack album was released digitally on the same day the game was released.

== Reception ==
Reception

Aggregate scores
Aggregator	Score
Metacritic	(NS) 63/100 (PS4) 67/100 (XONE) 60/100
OpenCritic	32% recommend

Review score
Publication	Score
Nintendo Life	7/10

On the review aggregation website Metacritic, the Nintendo Switch version of Cobra Kai: The Karate Kid Saga Continues has a score of 63% based on eight reviews, the PlayStation 4 version has a score of 67% based on eleven reviews, and the Xbox One version has a score of 60% based on seven reviews, all indicating "mixed or average" reviews. Fellow review aggregator OpenCritic assessed that the game received weak approval, being recommended by 32% of critics.
