= The Next Karate Kid =

1994 American martial arts drama film by Christopher Cain

- Theatrical release poster
- Directed by: Christopher Cain
- Written by: Mark Lee
- Based on: The Karate Kid by Robert Mark Kamen
- Produced by: Jerry Weintraub
- Starring: Noriyuki "Pat" Morita; Hilary Swank; Michael Ironside
- Cinematography: László Kovács
- Edited by: Ronald Roose
- Music by: Bill Conti
- Distributed by: Columbia Pictures
- Release dates: August 12, 1994 (Canada); September 9, 1994 (United States)
- Running time: 107 minutes
- Country: United States
- Language: English
- Budget: $12 million
- Box office: $15.8 million

The Next Karate Kid is a 1994 American martial arts drama film directed by Christopher Cain, produced by Jerry Weintraub, and written by Mark Lee. It is the fourth installment in The Karate Kid franchise and serves as a standalone sequel to The Karate Kid Part III (1989). The film stars Hilary Swank (in her first theatrical appearance in a starring role) as Julie Pierce, and Pat Morita reprising his role as Mr. Miyagi from the first three films (the only original cast member to return in this film and his final involvement with the Karate Kid franchise before his death in 2005), with Constance Towers, Chris Conrad, Michael Cavalieri, Walton Goggins, and Michael Ironside in supporting roles. Bill Conti, the composer of the previous films, returned to score the fourth. It is the first installment in the franchise not to feature Ralph Macchio in the lead role as Daniel LaRusso, and the first film not to be directed by John G. Avildsen, who directed the first three films.

Produced and distributed by Columbia Pictures, The Next Karate Kid was released on August 12, 1994, to negative reviews by critics and became the lowest-grossing film in the franchise.

== Plot ==
Five years after the second victory of Daniel LaRusso and the defeat of Mike Barnes, Mr. Miyagi travels to Arlington National Cemetery for a commendation for Japanese-Americans who fought in the 442nd Regimental Combat Team during World War II. He is referred to as "Keisuke Miyagi" during the ceremony. While there he also meets Louisa Pierce, the widow of his commanding officer Jack Pierce, and they both listen to the opening speech given by fellow veteran and Democratic Senator Daniel Inouye.

At Pierce's home in Boston, Miyagi is also introduced to Pierce's granddaughter, Julie, a teen struggling with anger issues due to her parents' death in a car crash. Her behavior has led to friction between Julie and her grandmother, along with her fellow students and teachers. She sneaks into the school at night to care for an injured Harris's hawk named "Angel," which she keeps in a pigeon coop on the roof.

Miyagi invites Louisa to stay at his house in Los Angeles to enjoy tending his garden while he remains in Boston as Julie's caretaker. At school, Julie meets and befriends Eric McGowen, a security guard-in-training and a pledge for a shady school security fraternity, the Alpha Elite. The members are taught to enforce the school rules, mostly using physical force, by a self-styled colonel, Paul Dugan. His toughest and most aggressive student is the short-fused Ned Randall, who makes unwelcome sexual advances upon Julie and even frames her for other infractions when he's rejected.

When Julie survives almost being hit by a car by jumping into a tiger position, she finally learns to confide in Miyagi when he recognizes her skill. She reveals she was taught karate by her father, who learned from her grandfather, Miyagi's student. She then requests Miyagi to become her teacher.

While trying to feed Angel one night, Julie is detected by the Alpha Elite who chase her through the school. Although she escapes them, she is arrested by the police and gets suspended for two weeks by Dugan.

Miyagi uses this time to take Julie to a Buddhist monastery to teach her the true ways of karate and how to manage her anger issues. At the monastery, Julie learns through direct lessons about balance, coordination, awareness, and respect for all life. She befriends the monks, who eventually have a birthday party for her, giving her a cake and an arrow that Miyagi had caught in mid-flight in a demonstration of Zen archery. They also concede to her wish that they visit her in Boston, where they go bowling with Miyagi. A local player challenges them, loses the match, and accepts their tutelage in how to bowl a strike blind in the art of Zen Bowling.

Upon returning to school, Julie discovers that Angel was found by Ned, who called Animal Control. Miyagi assists Julie in releasing the bird back into the wild, using the pain suppression technique from the first film to heal her broken wing.

In preparation for the prom, Miyagi teaches Julie how to dance, and buys her a dress. Julie goes to the prom with Eric, but under Dugan's orders, the Alpha Elite bungee-jump in. When one of the members breaks his arm, Eric shows concern, but Ned tells him to stay out of it.

Eric drives Julie home and kisses her. Ned follows them and smashes the windows of Eric's car with a baseball bat. Ned challenges him to a fight at the docks, and is joined there by Dugan and the Alpha Elite. They set fire to Eric's car and severely beat him, but he is saved by Julie and Miyagi.

Ned tries to grab Julie, but she challenges him to a fight. She holds her own, using the karate she has learned, even when Ned throws mud in her face. Julie defeats Ned and turns her back on him. Dugan bullies the rest of the group to continue the fight, but they refuse. Miyagi challenges Dugan to a fight and wins, leading the Alpha Elite to abandon him. The film concludes with Angel flying freely above the water.

== Cast ==
- Noriyuki "Pat" Morita as Mr. Miyagi
- Hilary Swank as Julie Pierce
- Michael Ironside as Colonel Dugan
- Constance Towers as Louisa Pierce
- Chris Conrad as Eric McGowen
- Sonny Trinidad as Abbot Monk
- Michael Cavalieri as Ned Randall
- Walton Goggins as Charlie
- Senator Daniel Inouye as Himself (cameo)
- Frank Welker as Angel the Hawk (voice)

== Production ==
In January 1993, it was reported that Christopher Cain would direct Karate Kid IV for producer Jerry Weintraub. Production began in June of that year in Washington, D.C. under the new title of The Next Karate Kid with Pat Morita slated to reprise his role as Mr. Miyagi and Hilary Swank as co-star.

== Release ==
The film was due to open wide in the United States and Canada in August 1994 however, was rescheduled to September. Despite the rescheduling, the film opened on August 12, 1994, in 32 French-language theaters in Canada where it grossed $95,260 in its opening weekend. It was suggested that Canadian studio representatives insisted that the film be released during summer although there were rumors that the studio forgot to pull all the dates. The film grossed $446,000 in Canada before expanding from 29 screens to 1,489 for its opening in the United States on September 9, 1994, where it grossed $2.6 million for the weekend, placing seventh at the US box office.

== Reception ==
=== Box office ===
The Next Karate Kid was the least successful movie of the series at the domestic box office. The total box office gross for The Next Karate Kid was $8.9 million ($16.71 million when adjusted for 2021 inflation), compared to $90.8 million ($247.27 million in 2021) for the original, $115.1 million ($274.72 million in 2021) for Part II, $38.9 million ($80.75 million in 2021) for Part III, and $171.8 million ($217.01 million in 2021) for the 2010 Karate Kid.

=== Critical reception ===
The Next Karate Kid was critically panned upon release in 1994, although many critics praised the performances of Morita and Swank.

On the review aggregator website Rotten Tomatoes, it holds an approval of 20% with an average score of 4.2/10 based on 51 reviews. The website's critical consensus reads: "The Next Karate Kid is noteworthy for giving audiences the chance to see a pre-Oscars Hilary Swank, but other than a typically solid performance from Pat Morita, this unnecessary fourth installment in the franchise has very little to offer". On Metacritic, the film has a weighted average score of 36 out of 100, based on 15 critics, indicating "generally unfavorable reviews". Audiences polled by CinemaScore gave the film an average grade of "B+" on an A+ to F scale.

=== Year-end lists ===
- Dishonorable mention – Dan Craft, The Pantagraph

== Home media ==
The film was released on DVD on August 28, 2001. A manufacture-on-demand Blu-ray release was released on September 6, 2016, as part of Sony's Choice Collection. It was later reissued as a "double feature" Blu-ray with The Karate Kid Part III by Mill Creek Entertainment on January 8, 2019.

== See also ==
- List of female action heroes and villains
- Million Dollar Baby
