= Jerry Weintraub =

American film producer (1937–2015)

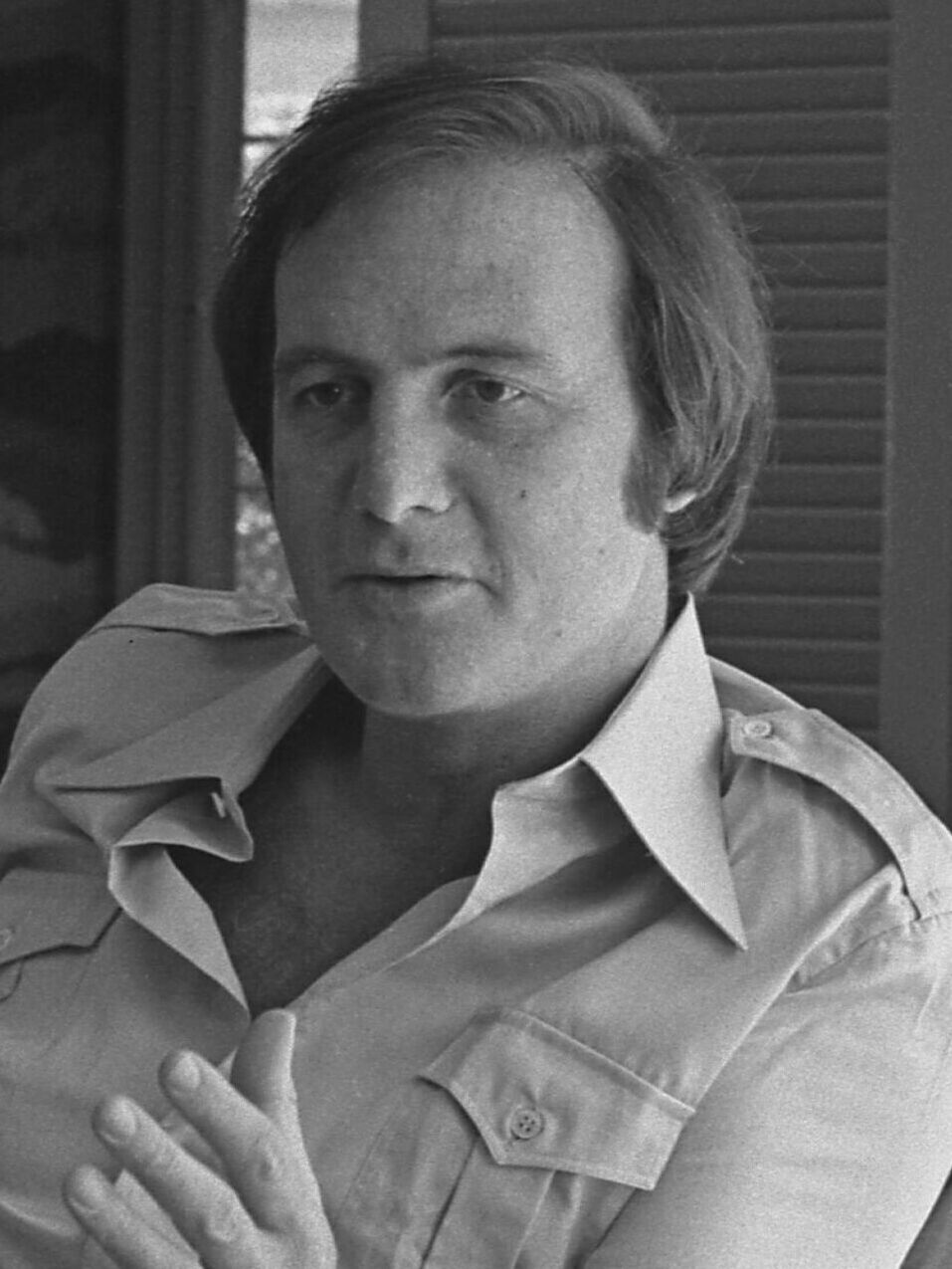
- Weintraub in 1975
- Born: Jerome Charles Weintraub; September 26, 1937; Brooklyn, New York, U.S.
- Died: July 6, 2015 (aged 77); Santa Barbara, California, U.S.
- Resting place: Hillside Memorial Park Cemetery
- Occupations: Film producer; talent agent; concert promoter; actor
- Years active: 1974–2015
- Spouses: Janice Greenberg (divorced) Jane Morgan (m. 1965, separated 1980s)
- Partner: Susan Ekins (1995–2015; his death)
- Children: 4

Jerome Charles Weintraub (September 26, 1937 – July 6, 2015) was an American film producer, talent manager and actor whose television films won him three Emmys.

He began his career as a talent agent, having managed known singer John Denver in 1970, developing Denver's success through concerts, television specials, and film roles, including Oh, God! (1977). Weintraub has been credited with making "show business history" by being the first to organize and manage large arena concert tours for singers. Among the other performers whose tours he managed were Elvis Presley, Frank Sinatra, The Four Seasons, Neil Diamond, Bob Dylan, Led Zeppelin, Three Dog Night and The Carpenters.

Following his years as a concert promoter, he began producing films. Among them were director Robert Altman's Nashville (1975), Barry Levinson's Diner (1982), the first five films from The Karate Kid franchise, as well as the remake Ocean's Eleven (2001), and its two sequels. Later, he was executive producer of HBO's series The Brink and HBO's Behind the Candelabra in 2013, which won an Emmy. In 2014, he won another Emmy as co-producer of Years of Living Dangerously, a television documentary about global warming. In 2011, HBO broadcast a television documentary about Weintraub's life, called His Way.

== Early years ==
Weintraub was born to a Jewish family in Brooklyn, and raised in the Bronx, the son of Rose (née Bass) and Samuel Weintraub. His father was a gem dealer. While growing up, he worked as a theater usher and as a waiter in the Catskills.

After several years at MCA, where he first started work as a mailroom clerk, he left and formed his own personal management company. While at MCA, he was assistant to Lew Wasserman, whom he reportedly thought of as a father figure.

In the 1960s, he co-founded the vocal group The Doodletown Pipers. Among the acts that Weintraub managed at this time were Paul Anka, Shelley Berman, Pat Boone, Joey Bishop, The Four Seasons, Jackson Browne, Jimmy Buffett, and singer Jane Morgan, whom he would later marry.

== Manager and concert promoter ==
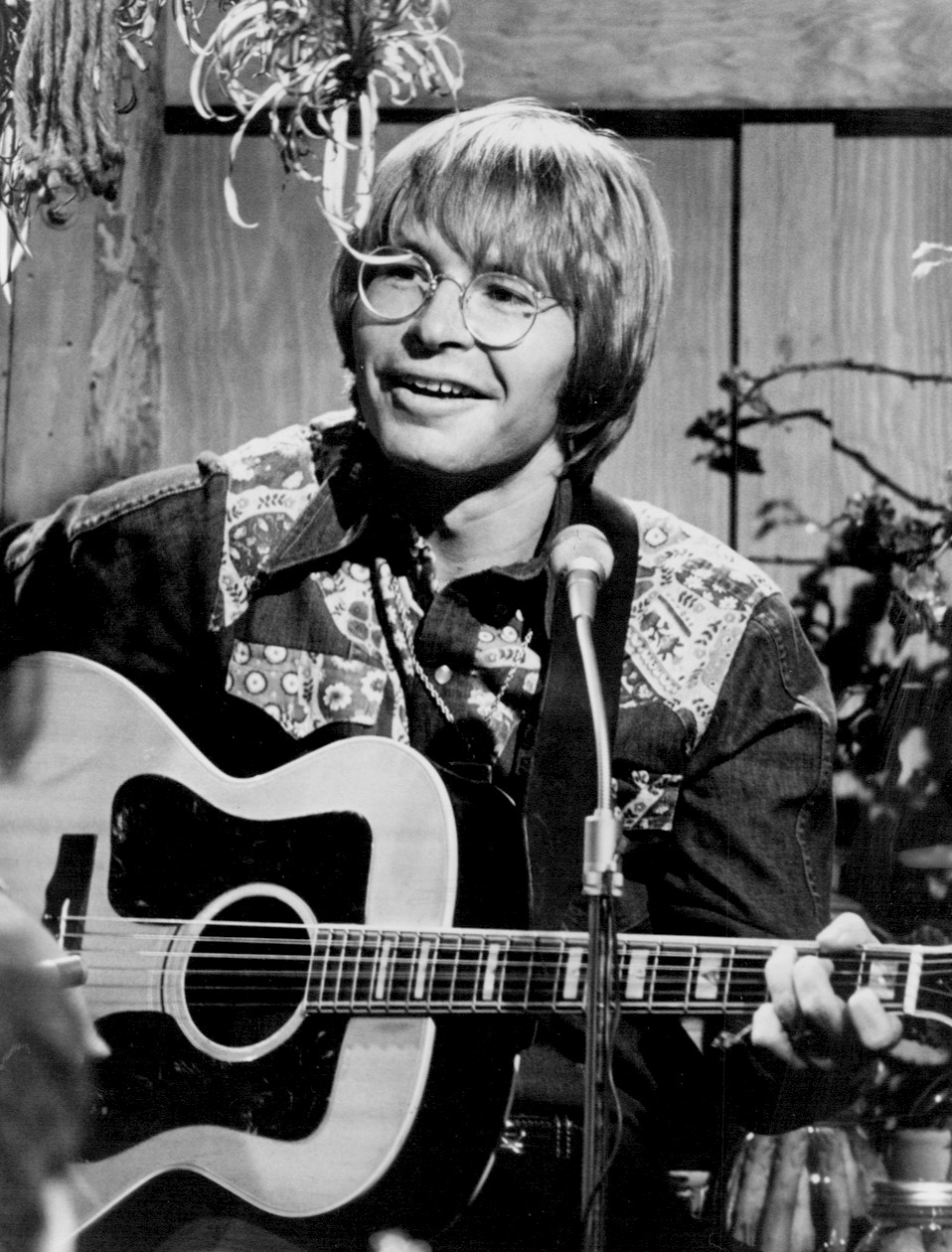
Weintraub received an Emmy for producing An Evening with John Denver in 1975.

Weintraub was the manager of singer and actor John Denver whom he signed in 1970. Weintraub first saw Denver performing at a small club in Greenwich Village and liked his easy, "mountaineer's" manner. Weintraub produced a dozen television music specials starring Denver, winning an Emmy for one of them. Later, he produced the film Oh, God! (1977), starring Denver and George Burns. After Denver became a major success as a singer, he bought Weintraub a Rolls-Royce as a thank you gift. Weintraub said, "I couldn't help thinking that it wasn't too long ago that neither of us had bus fare." Denver and Weintraub's professional relationship ended acrimoniously, however, he regretted not being reconciled with Denver before the singer's death.

In 1970, Weintraub convinced Elvis Presley and his manager, Col. Tom Parker, to do Presley's first national tour, something they had not considered, as Presley was by then a successful film star. The tour, with a modern sound system created for it, helped develop Weintraub's career as a concert promoter.

He next promoted a tour for Frank Sinatra in 1974, whom Weintraub first put in Madison Square Garden's boxing arena. For the previous six years, Sinatra had basically retired due to the failure of his last album. Weintraub convinced him to do a tour, which led to Sinatra's "transformation from saloon singer to stadium singer", wrote biographer Will Friedwald. "When Frank came out of retirement and started doing stadiums, he didn't know if he would draw," recalled guitarist Al Viola. "Weintraub deserves most of the credit (after Sinatra, that is) for pulling this off," says Friedwald.

Bob Dylan signed with Weintraub in 1978 after watching a Neil Diamond concert in Las Vegas, knowing that Weintraub managed the event. Dylan began a world tour beginning in Japan which continued through Europe and the US, performing 114 shows in front of two million people.

Biographer David Morrell writes, "We take this for granted now, but Weintraub's ability to organize these massive concerts made show-business history." Led Zeppelin manager, Peter Grant, recalls that Weintraub worked hard at putting on these large shows. "It was an event," Grant says. And "Jerry Weintraub loved it." Weintraub acknowledged his motivations: "When I believe in something, it's going to get done," he wrote in his autobiography.

Weintraub also managed or promoted concerts for such musical acts as Cuba Gooding Sr., the Main Ingredient, the Carpenters, the Moody Blues, and the Beach Boys.

== Film and television producer ==
When it comes to work, nobody works harder. When it comes to charities, nobody guilts better. And when it comes to friendship, he has no peers. That's Jerry's great talent. He doesn't just light up a room, he lights it on fire. He's a great producer, a great organizer, a great friend, and truly the greatest showman on earth.

— George Clooney

Weintraub's first film as a producer was Robert Altman's Nashville (1975). Until then, United Artists producer David Picker had dismissed the script and would not make the film. A short time later, Weintraub was hosting a party for John Denver in New York, and among the guests he invited was Altman, whom he admired but had never met. "Altman pulled Weintraub aside", recalled screenwriter, Joan Tewkesbury, "and over a shared joint", Altman told Weintraub about the script. After another meeting with Altman, Weintraub was hooked on the story. However, no studio wanted to work with Altman, telling Weintraub that the director was a "pain in the ass". Weintraub eventually managed to find investors and gave Altman the $2 million he needed to make the film.

Following Nashville, Weintraub's credits as producer over the next few years included Oh, God! (1977), September 30, 1955 (1978), Cruising (1980), All Night Long (1981), and Diner (1982).

In July 1985, he became chairman and chief executive officer of the board of trustees of the Los Angeles International Film Exposition (Filmex) but oversaw its demise with the board agreeing to merge with the American Cinematheque in January 1986 and all but one employee leaving.

The success of The Karate Kid (1984), led Kirk Kerkorian, then owner of MGM/UA, to appoint Weintraub as chairman and CEO of the neglected United Artists division in November 1985, with Weintraub acquiring a minority stake, but clashes between the two men led to Weintraub's departure after five months. The Karate Kid had several sequels, all produced by Weintraub, The Karate Kid Part II (1986), The Karate Kid Part III (1989) and The Next Karate Kid (1994).

Weintraub formed Weintraub Entertainment Group (WEG) in February 1987 with $461 million in financing from Columbia Pictures, Cineplex Odeon and others. WEG also signed a 20-year distribution deal with Columbia, and planned to release seven or more movies per year. In 1990 WEG filed for Chapter 11 bankruptcy, and Weintraub would then produce for Warner Bros. WEG also subsequently settled a suit brought against it by Columbia.

Weintraub's later films as producer were Happy New Year (1987), Pure Country (1992), The Specialist (1994), Vegas Vacation (1997), The Newton Boys (1998), The Avengers (1998), Soldier (1998), Nancy Drew (2007), The Karate Kid (2010), and the 2001 remake of Ocean's Eleven, for which he founded the company JW Productions. In addition to producing the sequels Ocean's Twelve (2004) and Ocean's Thirteen (2007), he appeared in all the Ocean's films. Weintraub had a small role in Vegas Vacation (1997) as "Gilly from Philly" a high roller casino gambler with two pals, and in The Firm (1993).

He was executive producer of HBO's series, The Brink, and HBO's Behind the Candelabra in 2013, an Emmy-winning drama about the last ten years in the life of pianist Liberace. In 2014, he also won an Emmy as co-producer of Years of Living Dangerously, a television documentary about global warming.

A television documentary film about Weintraub's life, called His Way, directed by Douglas McGrath, was broadcast on HBO in 2011. On a 2010 television appearance of The View, Weintraub made a handshake deal with Whoopi Goldberg to play the next God in a future Oh, God! sequel, should a favorable script become available. Weintraub had agreed to produce a new adaptation of The Legend of Tarzan for Warner Bros. which was released on July 1, 2016.

== Philanthropy ==
Weintraub led some very successful campaign fundraisers for the Republican Party and was good at fundraising. He was a major contributor to many charities, including the Los Angeles County Museum of Art, the Museum of Contemporary Art, the Music Center, the UCLA School of Dentistry and the Children's Museum of Los Angeles. In 1988, the American Friends of the Hebrew University gave Weintraub and his wife, Jane, the Scopus Award in gratitude for their support. He was also a major supporter of Chabad and was close with the Lubavitcher Rebbe.

He also began doing charitable work to help stop the ongoing genocide taking place in Darfur in 2007. Weintraub, Matt Damon, George Clooney, Don Cheadle, David Pressman, and Brad Pitt cofounded the nonprofit organization, Not On Our Watch, dedicated to preventing mass killings in Darfur and other areas of the world. They raised $9.3 million to aid their relief efforts.

== Personal life ==
Weintraub was married twice. His first wife was Janice Greenberg, a dentist's daughter from his Bronx neighborhood who had been singer Julius La Rosa's secretary. They had a son.

Weintraub's second wife was singer and actress Jane Morgan, who was 13 years his senior. Their relationship went from professional to personal and the two were married in 1965 when she was 41 and he was 28. They adopted three daughters. The couple separated in the 1980s, but never divorced. For 20 years until his death, Weintraub had been living with his partner, Susan Ekins.

Weintraub supported both political parties at various times in his life. However, it is widely noted that he was friends with both George H. W. Bush and Ronald Reagan. He also had a strong spiritual side, which he once described to television host Larry King. He was a devotee of The Lubavitcher Rebbe and believed in his mystical powers.

== Death ==
Weintraub died from cardiac arrest in Santa Barbara, California, on July 6, 2015, at the age of 77.

Following the announcement of his death, celebrities and friends paid tribute to Weintraub. "Jerry was an American original, who earned his success by the sheer force of his instinct, drive, and larger-than-life personality," said former president George H.W. Bush, a longtime friend. "He had a passion for life, and throughout the ups and downs of his prolific career it was clear just how much he loved show business."

"He was a force of nature," said actor and director Carl Reiner. Actor Don Cheadle wrote, "Jerry was to me equal parts Godfather, rainmaker, caretaker, PT Barnum and friend." George Clooney, star of the Ocean's movies, said that "in the coming days there will be tributes about our friend Jerry Weintraub. We'll laugh at his great stories, and applaud his accomplishments. And in the years to come, the stories and accomplishments will get better with age, just as Jerry would have wanted it. But not today. Today our friend died."

He is interred at Hillside Memorial Park Cemetery in Culver City, California.

== Filmography ==
He was a producer in all films unless otherwise noted.

=== Film ===
Year	Title	Credit	Notes
1975	Nashville	Executive producer	
1977	September 30, 1955		
1977	Oh, God!		
1980	Cruising		
1981	All Night Long		
1982	Diner		
1984	The Karate Kid		
1986	The Karate Kid Part II		
1987	Happy New Year		
1988	My Stepmother Is an Alien	Executive producer	
1989	The Karate Kid Part III		
1992	Pure Country		
1994	The Next Karate Kid		
1994	The Specialist		
1997	Vegas Vacation		
1998	The Avengers		
1998	Soldier		
2000	The Independent	Executive producer	
2001	Ocean's Eleven		
2004	Ocean's Twelve		
2007	Ocean's Thirteen		
2007	Nancy Drew		
2010	The Karate Kid		
2016	The Legend of Tarzan		Posthumous release

As an actor

Year	Title	Role
1993	The Firm	Sonny Capps
1997	Vegas Vacation	Jilly
2001	Ocean's Eleven	High Roller
2002	Full Frontal	Jerry
2002	Confessions of a Dangerous Mind	Larry Goldberg
2004	Ocean's Twelve	American Businessman
2007	Ocean's Thirteen	Denny Shields

Thanks

Year	Title	Role
2015	The Haunting of Pearson Place	Inspired by
2016	The Legend of Tarzan	For
2018	Ocean's 8	In loving memory of

=== Television ===
Year	Title	Credit	Notes
1974	Sinatra – The Main Event	Executive producer	Television special
1974	The John Denver Show	Executive producer	
1975	An Evening with John Denver	Executive producer	Television special
1975	Rocky Mountain Christmas	Executive producer	Television special
1976	John Denver and Friend	Executive producer	Television special
1976	Father O Father	Executive producer	Television film
1976	The Dorothy Hamill Special	Executive producer	Television special
1976	The Carpenters' Very First TV Special	Executive producer	Television special
1977	Neil Diamond: Love at the Greek	Executive producer	Television special
1977	The Starland Vocal Band Show	Executive producer	Television special
1977	Neil Diamond: I'm Glad You're Here with Me Tonight	Executive producer	Television special
1977	Szysznyk	Executive producer	
1977	The Carpenters at Christmas	Executive producer	Television special
1978	John Denver in Australia	Executive producer	Television special
1978	Pat Boone and Family	Executive producer	Television film
1978	Dorothy Hamill Presents Winners	Executive producer	Television special
1978	King of the Road	Executive producer	Television film
1978	The Carpenters...Space Encounters	Executive producer	Television special
1978	The Carpenters: A Christmas Portrait	Executive producer	Television special
1979	John Denver and the Muppets: A Christmas Together	Executive producer	Television special
1980	When the Whistle Blows	Executive producer	
1980	The Jimmy McNichol Special		Television special
1980	Rocky Mountain Reunion	Executive producer	Television film
1980	The Carpenters: Music, Music, Music	Executive producer	Television special
1980	Blue Jeans	Executive producer	Television film
1981	John Denver: Music and the Mountains	Executive producer	Television special
1983	Rocky Mountain Holiday with John Denver and the Muppets	Executive producer	Television special
1983	Diner	Executive producer	Television pilot
1983	John Denver: The Higher We Fly	Executive producer	Television film
1984	The Cowboy and the Ballerina	Executive producer	Television film
1989	The Karate Kid	Executive producer	
2005	L'Chaim: To Life Telethon	Executive producer	Television film
2013	Behind the Candelabra	Executive producer	Television film
2015	The Brink	Executive producer	
2016	The Sherry Wolf Show	Co-producer	
2014–2016	Years of Living Dangerously	Executive producer	Documentary
2016–2022	Westworld	Executive producer	

== Awards and honors ==
In 1986, the National Association of Theatre Owners named Weintraub the Producer of the Year. In 1991, he was named to the board of the Kennedy Center. Weintraub was one of the first independent film producers to be honored with a star on the Hollywood Walk of Fame. In 2007, a Golden Palm Star on the Palm Springs Walk of Stars was dedicated to him. 2012 he was honored with the Career Achievement Award of Zurich Film Festival.

== Bibliography ==
- Weintraub, Jerry (2011). When I Stop Talking, You'll Know I'm Dead: Useful Stories from a Persuasive Man. Twelve. ISBN 978-0446548168.
