= Cobra Kai season 3 =

Cobra Kai
- Season 3
- Promotional poster
- Showrunners: Josh Heald; Jon Hurwitz; Hayden Schlossberg
- Starring: Ralph Macchio; William Zabka; Courtney Henggeler; Xolo Maridueña; Tanner Buchanan; Mary Mouser; Jacob Bertrand; Gianni DeCenzo; Martin Kove
- No. of episodes: 10

Release
- Original network: Netflix
- Original release: January 1, 2021

Season chronology
- ← Previous; Season 2 Next → Season 4

The third season of Cobra Kai, stylized as Cobra KaIII, was released on Netflix on January 1, 2021, and consisted of 10 episodes. The series is a sequel to the original films of The Karate Kid franchise, focusing on the characters of Daniel LaRusso and Johnny Lawrence over 30 years after the original film. This is the first season to be released on Netflix after YouTube decided to sell the series following the first two seasons. YouTube ordered the season in 2019 and initially set a 2020 release date which was delayed after Netflix's acquisition.

The season is set in the aftermath of the school brawl, which has left Miguel paralyzed, Robby a wanted criminal, Cobra Kai under Kreese's thumb and Miyagi-Do shut down. As the students of Cobra Kai grow increasingly ruthless, many individuals must overcome their traumas and rivalries once and for all.

There were nine starring roles throughout the season which also featured guest actors returning to the franchise portraying characters from the first and second films. A soundtrack featuring music from the season was also released in January 2021. The season was met with positive reviews from critics. The season also received numerous award nominations including an Emmy nomination for Outstanding Comedy Series. It is considered an international success ranking on Netflix's top ten list in 85 countries and reaching 45 million viewers within the first four months of its release.

== Cast and characters ==
=== Main ===
- Ralph Macchio as Daniel LaRusso
- William Zabka as Johnny Lawrence
- Courtney Henggeler as Amanda LaRusso
- Xolo Maridueña as Miguel Diaz
- Tanner Buchanan as Robby Keene
- Mary Mouser as Samantha LaRusso
- Jacob Bertrand as Eli "Hawk" Moskowitz
- Gianni DeCenzo as Demetri Alexopoulos
- Martin Kove as John Kreese

=== Recurring ===
- Peyton List as Tory Nichols (Note: Despite only being credited as a recurring guest star, List was frequently listed alongside other starring cast members in promotional material.)
- Vanessa Rubio as Carmen Diaz
- Aedin Mincks as Mitch
- Khalil Everage as Chris
- Annalisa Cochrane as Yasmine
- Hannah Kepple as Moon Taylor
- Bret Ernst as Louie LaRusso Jr.
- Owen Morgan as Bert
- Nathaniel Oh as Nathaniel
- Okea Eme-Akwari as Shawn Payne
- Joe Seo as Kyler Park

=== Notable guests ===
- Diora Baird as Shannon Keene
- Barrett Carnahan as young John Kreese
- Terayle Hill as Trey
- Jeff Kaplan as Cruz
- Ed Asner as Sid Weinberg
- Dan Ahdoot as Anoush Norouzi
- David Shatraw as Tom Cole
- Ron Thomas as Bobby Brown
- Susan Gallagher as "Homeless" Lynn
- Tamlyn Tomita as Kumiko
- Yuji Okumoto as Chozen Toguchi
- Traci Toguchi as Yuna
- Dee Snider as himself
- Griffin Santopietro as Anthony LaRusso
- Bo Mitchell as Brucks
- Ken Davitian as Armand Zarkarian
- Terry Serpico as Captain George Turner
- Nick Marini as young Terry Silver
- Elisabeth Shue as Ali Mills
- Deborah May as Mrs. Mills

== Episodes ==
Cobra Kai season 3 episodes
No. overall	No. in season	Title	Directed by	Written by	Original release date
21	1	"Aftermath"	Jon Hurwitz & Hayden Schlossberg	Josh Heald & Jon Hurwitz & Hayden Schlossberg	January 1, 2021
Johnny is still trying to cope with the trauma of Miguel's accident, which ends up with him getting heavily intoxicated and later arrested and jailed after getting into a brawl fight at a bar. Meanwhile, two weeks after the school fight, the All-Valley Community is still shaken up, coming to grips with the consequences. The school has since put an anti-physical contact rule in action. Sam suffers from panic attacks and flashbacks following her fight with Tory and watching Miguel's fall accidentally caused by Robby while Johnny purposely hurts himself so he can sneak into the ICU and visit Miguel. When Daniel finds out Robby, who is expelled from school for crippling Miguel at the end of the school brawl and, on the run, stole a van from the dealership, Daniel and Johnny team up to find him. At the same time, Miguel finally wakes up from his coma. Note: This episode is dedicated in memory of Rob Garrison.
22	2	"Nature vs. Nurture"	Jon Hurwitz & Hayden Schlossberg	Teleplay by : Joe Piarulli & Luan Thomas; Story by : Josh Heald & Jon Hurwitz & Hayden Schlossberg & Joe Piarulli & Luan Thomas	January 1, 2021
Daniel and Johnny visit Shannon at her rehab center to look for Robby and are directed to visit Robby's former gang acquaintances in jail. The search eventually leads the pair to a group of thieves who have stolen the van from Robby, leading the pair to dispatch them in self-defense. However, their brief partnership ends due to Johnny continuously assaulting one of the thieves. Johnny attempts to visit the now-conscious Miguel, but Miguel, feeling betrayed, tearfully and angrily rebuffs him. Daniel finds Robby at the rehab center and has the police take him into custody in hopes of lessening his sentence, but Robby feels betrayed and cuts ties with Daniel. Meanwhile, Kreese attacks Tory's landlord so that he removes the pressure she has on taking care of her ill mother and ensures her loyalty to Cobra Kai. He also expels some students from Cobra Kai for objecting to feeding a hamster to a snake.
23	3	"Now You're Gonna Pay"	Lin Oeding	Teleplay by : Stacey Harman; Story by : Josh Heald & Jon Hurwitz & Hayden Schlossberg & Stacey Harman	January 1, 2021
Johnny solicits Bobby for advice on how to help pay for Miguel's surgery and visit Robby in juvenile hall. The Miyagi-Do students, led by Sam, carry out a car wash fundraising event to help fund Miguel's surgery, only for Hawk and some Cobra Kai students to show up after the event and steal the money. Johnny reluctantly approaches Sid to ask for the money to pay for the surgery but is rebuffed, so he steals one of Sid's valuable statues. Meanwhile, due to the school brawl incident, Daniel learns that his business rival, Tom Cole, has convinced Japanese car importer, Doyona International, to cut their business ties with Daniel, prompting him to visit the company headquarters in Tokyo for negotiations. Sam prepares for the Miyagi-Do students to fight back against Cobra Kai, while Johnny reluctantly misses his appointment to visit Robby in juvenile hall to stay with Miguel, causing Robby to feel abandoned and neglected.
24	4	"The Right Path"	Lin Oeding	Teleplay by : Michael Jonathan Smith; Story by : Josh Heald & Jon Hurwitz & Hayden Schlossberg & Michael Jonathan Smith	January 1, 2021
Daniel is rejected by Doyona due to the school brawl incident, so he decides to travel to Okinawa, Mr. Miyagi's hometown. At the same time, Johnny tries to reconcile with Robby, who is on community service, but their conversation quickly escalates when Johnny accidentally reminds Robby that he was the one who put Miguel in the hospital. At school, Hawk instigates fights with the Miyagi-Do students in retaliation for Robby's actions against Miguel during the school brawl before being threatened with Saturday detention, while the Miyagi-Do students receive Saturday detention. Daniel visits Tomi Village, which has been turned into a mall after the village's crops died out, where he is reunited with his former love interest, Kumiko, and unexpectedly encounters his rival, Chozen. Johnny then personally oversees Miguel's physical rehabilitation.
25	5	"Miyagi-Do"	Steven Tsuchida	Teleplay by : Bob Dearden; Story by : Josh Heald & Jon Hurwitz & Hayden Schlossberg & Bob Dearden	January 1, 2021
When Miyagi-Do student Chris is attacked at his job in Golf N' Stuff by Cobra Kai, Sam and the rest of the Miyagi-Do students attack Hawk's gang at the amusement park, only to be ambushed by Tory, as Hawk breaks Demetri's right arm in the process, traumatizing Sam, who still fears Tory. Meanwhile, Daniel and Chozen reconcile after undergoing some sparring sessions, with Chozen teaching Daniel the pressure point technique and giving him a martial arts scroll as a parting gift. Daniel later meets an adult Yuna, the little girl he saved from the typhoon 33 years prior. (Note: As depicted in The Karate Kid Part II (1986)) Learning that Yuna has become the Vice President of Sales for Doyona, she gladly offers to let him keep the dealership's relationship with Doyona. Robby gets involved in a fight with fellow juvenile inmate Shawn and his thugs, but both ultimately earn each other's respect for not snitching on each other. Johnny helps Miguel with his rehabilitation and takes him to a Dee Snider concert, allowing Miguel to regain feeling in his legs. Johnny later accepts Ali's friend request, while Amanda confronts Kreese and slaps him in retaliation for the laser tag fight that Hawk and his gang instigated, threatening to call the cops if he doesn't stop sending Cobra Kai students after Miyagi-Do.
26	6	"King Cobra"	Steven Tsuchida	Teleplay by : Joe Piarulli & Luan Thomas; Story by : Josh Heald & Jon Hurwitz & Hayden Schlossberg & Joe Piarulli & Luan Thomas	January 1, 2021
Kreese approaches various athletes to bolster the Cobra Kai ranks, including Kyler. Daniel and Amanda attempt to file a restraining order against Kreese but learn that Kreese has already filed one against Amanda after the confrontation. Despite Amanda filing a restraining order against Kreese, they approach Armand Zarkarian with bribes in a desperate attempt to evict Kreese, only for Armand to reluctantly void his deal with the LaRussos after a failed eviction attempt. Meanwhile, Miguel helps Johnny build up his Facebook profile to impress Ali, inadvertently meeting with Tory, who breaks up with Miguel after he disagrees with her desire for revenge against Sam and Miyagi-Do. Frustrated by this, Miguel takes it out on Johnny by calling him out on his hypocrisy about abandoning people after helping them but manages to stand up in the process. Seeing the truth in Miguel's words, Johnny uploads photos of his positive accomplishments with his students and Miguel's recovery before sending Ali a heartfelt message on Facebook.
27	7	"Obstáculos"	Jennifer Celotta	Teleplay by : Alyssa Forleiter; Story by : Josh Heald & Jon Hurwitz & Hayden Schlossberg & Alyssa Forleiter	January 1, 2021
Sam has a nightmare in which she and Tory duel in the Miyagi-Do dojo, which ends with Tory drowning Sam in the Miyagi-Do pond. After days of training, Miguel can finally walk freely again. Daniel spends the day with Sam to help her overcome her fear of Tory after she confesses the panic attacks to him, even going so far as to tell her the story of how he overcame his fear with Mr. Miyagi's help when he narrowly defeated Mike Barnes during the sudden death match of the 1985 All-Valley Tournament. (Note: As depicted in The Karate Kid Part III (1989)) When Miguel returns to school, he finds out about the Golf N' Stuff fight and cuts his ties with the Cobra Kai students and the dojo itself. Johnny then takes his most loyal students and makes a new dojo called "Eagle Fang Karate." The Cobra Kai students then confront Johnny, and Kreese decides to leave Johnny permanently.
28	8	"The Good, the Bad, and the Badass"	Jennifer Celotta	Teleplay by : Mattea Greene; Story by : Josh Heald & Jon Hurwitz & Hayden Schlossberg & Mattea Greene	January 1, 2021
The local city council removes the 2019 All-Valley Karate Tournament championship permit to politically distance itself from the aftermath of the school brawl, prompting Johnny, Daniel, and Kreese to make their cases, respectively. However, all three of them are dismissed from making their case when Amanda brings in personal attacks on Kreese. Sam and Miguel make their case about the need for Karate, prompting the city council to change their minds and reinstate the tournament. Sam and Miguel catch up in the aftermath, leading to a friendly sparring session. However, Robby, having completed his sentence and rebuffed Daniel and Johnny's previous attempts at reconciling, mistakenly sees the sparring session as Sam cheating on him again and believes that Tory was right about Sam and Miguel after all. Robby furiously ends his relationship with Sam and turns to Kreese for help, while Johnny and Carmen make up and resume their relationship.
29	9	"Feel the Night"	Josh Heald	Teleplay by : Michael Jonathan Smith; Story by : Josh Heald & Jon Hurwitz & Hayden Schlossberg & Michael Jonathan Smith	January 1, 2021
Ali returns to Los Angeles for the holidays and reunites with Johnny. The Cobra Kai students initially feel wary about Robby's presence following his actions against Miguel during the school brawl incident, but eventually warm up to him after he steals a snake at the local zoo as a present for Kreese (except for Hawk). Miguel and Daniel find some common ground between Johnny and Daniel's childhood. Later, Sam and Miguel, who have rekindled their own romance, create an alliance between Miyagi-Do and Eagle Fang to fight against Cobra Kai. At the same time, Johnny, Ali, Daniel, and Amanda go to the same country club for a Christmas party.
30	10	"December 19"	Josh Heald	Teleplay by : Bob Dearden; Story by : Josh Heald & Jon Hurwitz & Hayden Schlossberg & Bob Dearden	January 1, 2021
While Johnny and Ali mingle with Daniel and Amanda at a Christmas party, Cobra Kai students led by Tory bust into the LaRusso house. During the brawl, Miguel refuses to give up. Johnny's words ring through his ears, and he overcomes his limitations and knocks out Kyler. At the same time, Hawk, having had a change of heart, reconciles with Demetri and turns on Cobra Kai, and Sam finally conquers her fear, gaining the upper hand over Tory before Cobra Kai retreats. Johnny and Daniel separately learn of the ensuing conflict after the party, with Johnny instigating a fight with Kreese, who has been training Robby. Johnny briefly gains the upper hand, but Robby chooses to defend Kreese, leading to Johnny accidentally knock his son out. Kreese uses the opportunity to choke Johnny, but Daniel intervenes and gains the upper hand using the Miyagi pressure point technique he learned from Chozen, barely sparing Kreese after being stopped by Sam and Miguel. Kreese, with Robby firmly on his side, agrees to leave if Cobra Kai loses the upcoming tournament and later gives a call to Terry Silver. The next day, Daniel and Johnny train their students together at the Miyagi-Do Karate dojo in preparation for the tournament.

== Production ==
=== Development ===
YouTube renewed Cobra Kai for a third season in May 2019. The following year, Sony Pictures Television, the series distribution company, was looking to move the series to a different platform ahead of the season's release. At the time, it was said that YouTube was willing to release the third season but was not interested in renewing it for a fourth because the platform changed its model from streaming video on demand to advertising-based video on demand and as a result was shifting its focus from scripted programming to unscripted. Netflix and Hulu were named as potential buyers for the season. In June 2020, the series was moving to Netflix. Josh Heald, Jon Hurwitz, and Hayden Schlossberg returned as executive producers for the season through their production company, Counterbalance Entertainment, while Will Smith, James Lassiter, and Caleeb Pinkett served as executive produced through the Overbrook Entertainment production company. In addition, series stars Macchio and Zabka were co-executive producers. Ahead of the third season's release, Netflix renewed the series for a fourth season.

=== Casting ===
The season featured nine starring roles, all of which returned from the previous season. Peyton List continued to recur as Tory Nichols, a character introduced in the second season, and often appeared alongside the main cast in promotional events, material, and interviews. Elisabeth Shue returned to the franchise in a two-episode story arc reprising her role as Ali Mills from The Karate Kid. The Karate Kid Part II actors Ron Thomas, Tamlyn Tomita, Traci Toguchi, and Yuji Okumoto also returned during the season reprising their roles as Bobby, Kumiko, Yuna, and Chozen Toguchi, respectively. Actress Nichole Brown confirmed that she would not be returning to the series as Aisha Robinson after recurring throughout the first two seasons because the writers couldn't fit her into the story. Jon Hurwitz later stated in an interview that he was open to having the character appear in a later season. Paul Walter Hauser, who played Raymond "Stingray" in the previous season, was intended to return, but his commitments with Cruella, which was being filmed overseas, prevented him from reprising the role, as the film was shot concurrently to this season. Singer-songwriter Dee Snider guest starred in one episode performing as the band Twisted Sister.

=== Filming ===
Filming on the season was complete in 2019 prior to the series acquisition by Netflix. Principal photography for the season took place in Atlanta, Georgia. Additional locations included a two-day filming block in Okinawa, Japan in November 2019. The house where the character Daniel LaRusso and his family lives is located in Marietta, Georgia, and was featured on an episode of HGTV's My Big Amazing Renovation. Some filming also took place in Los Angeles, California, where the series is set, and surrounding suburbs.

=== Music ===
Featured music throughout the season primarily highlighted music from the 1980s. Guest star Dee Snider performed the song "I Wanna Rock".

==== Soundtrack ====
Cobra Kai: Season 3 (Soundtrack from the Netflix Original Series)
- Album cover.

Soundtrack album by Leo Birenberg & Zach Robinson
- Released: January 8, 2021
- Genre: Soundtrack
- Label: Madison Gate

Leo Birenberg & Zach Robinson chronology
Cobra Kai: Season 2 (Soundtrack from the Original Series) (2019)	Cobra Kai: Season 3 (Soundtrack from the Netflix Original Series) (2021)	Cobra Kai: Wax Off - EP (2021)

Madison Gate Records released a digital soundtrack album on January 8, 2021, entitled Cobra Kai: Season 3 (Soundtrack from the Netflix Original Series), to accompany the third season. A 2-CD Deluxe Edition soundtrack, featuring 19 additional bonus tracks, was released by La-La Land Records on January 19. Leo Birenberg and Zach Robinson continued to serve as composers for the third season. Birenbeng and Robinson stated in an interview that they wished to bring an eighties feel to the soundtrack and took inspiration from bands such as X Japan and DragonForce. The track "Miyagi Metal" incorporated themes from the original Karate Kid soundtrack, composed by Bill Conti.

===== Track listing =====
All music is composed by Leo Birenberg & Zach Robinson, except where noted.

No.	Title	Length
1.	"Miyagi Metal" (Bill Conti)	2:14
2.	"Come Back to Us"	1:38
3.	"Work Together"	1:47
4.	"Addition by Subtraction"	2:31
5.	"Chop Shop"	2:00
6.	"Return to Okinawa"	3:18
7.	"Diners, Drive-Ins, and Dojos"	1:33
8.	"Look at Me"	1:28
9.	"Live or Die, Man"	1:39
10.	"Crane Technique" (Conti)	3:01
11.	"Web MD"	1:08
12.	"Secrets of Miyagi-Do"	2:53
13.	"Be a Better Person"	1:26
14.	"Snake in the Grass"	2:04
15.	"The Cobra Effect"	2:33
16.	"Snap"	1:46
17.	"Can't Run Away from Your Problems"	1:45
18.	"Forming a Team"	1:36
19.	"Two-Time Champion"	1:32
20.	"Dark Hawk"	1:39
21.	"I'm a Sensei"	1:58
22.	"Nightmare"	1:55
23.	"We Deserve the Chance"	2:45
24.	"Dream Come True"	0:36
25.	"The Good, the Bad, and the Badass"	1:57
26.	"Start Over"	1:28
27.	"The Right Path"	2:59
28.	"Dojo from Hell"	1:49
29.	"Carol of the Cobras"	2:16
30.	"Must Not Lose to Fear"	1:44
31.	"The Call of the Cobras"	2:12
32.	"Snake Bitten"	2:18
33.	"Duel of the Snakes"	2:56
34.	"Ourboros"	4:47
35.	"Challenger"	3:09
36.	"Duel of the Snakes (Mega-Edit) (Note: Included as the first bonus track on the La-La Land Records release.)"	9:58
37.	"Miyagi Metal ('Shred'-along) (Note: Not included on the La-La Land Records release.)"	2:16
Total length:		87:21

La-La Land Records bonus tracks
No.	Title	Length
1.	"Duel of the Snakes (Mega-Edit)"	9:58
2.	"Out of Town" (Conti)	0:42
3.	"Clarence"	1:37
4.	"Make Things Right"	0:33
5.	"Go Get It"	0:57
6.	"Ghost of the Past"	1:09
7.	"Learn to Strike First"	1:06
8.	"I Forgive You" (Conti)	1:56
9.	"Hey Johnny"	0:58
10.	"Johnny's Photos"	0:27
11.	"Cobra Kai Material"	1:26
12.	"You Need Help"	1:36
13.	"Nasty Nephews"	0:33
14.	"I'm Scared"	1:44
15.	"Caught"	1:01
16.	"Prisoners"	2:56
17.	"Demetri's Speech"	0:58
18.	"Fight's Over"	1:05
19.	"Must Follow Passion"	1:59
20.	"The Nature, the Tradition"	0:27
Total length:		33:22

== Marketing and release ==
YouTube initially slated the season for a 2020 release. After the series was sold to Netflix the first two seasons were released on the streaming platform in late 2020 with the third season to be released at a "later date". As part of the move, the first two seasons remained available to stream to subscribers of YouTube Premium. Originally to be released on January 8, 2021, this date was changed to January 1, coinciding with New Year's Day.

== Reception ==
=== Critical response ===
Professional ratings
Aggregate scores
Source	Rating
Metacritic	72/100
Rotten Tomatoes	90%
Review scores
Source	Rating
The A.V. Club	B−
Entertainment Weekly	B
Radio Times	5/5 stars
IGN	8/10
The Telegraph	4/5 stars

On the review aggregator website Rotten Tomatoes, the season holds a 90% approval rating with an average rating of 8 out of 10 based on 51 reviews. On Metacritic, the season has a weighted average score of 72 out of 100, based on reviews from 15 critics, indicating "generally favorable" reviews. CNN's Brian Lowry wrote that the third season "kicks up the nostalgia factor into an even higher gear while remaining every bit as soapy, playful and disarmingly funny". Jen Chaney of Vulture held a similar opinion writing that the series feeds to Generation X nostalgia but that the season also provided an underlying theme that nostalgia is toxic. Saidat Giwa-Osagie with Radio Times said the episodes during the season were the most comedic so far and that the finale episode resolved more than the preceding two finales. Meanwhile, IGN's Matt Fowler opined that the season "achieves a resoundingly fun balance between triumphant and corny". Alex McLevy, writing for The A.V. Club, felt that some plotlines were planned poorly but that the season returned to its basic themes leading to an enjoyable season. Entertainment Weekly writer Darren Franich held a slightly dissenting opinion saying that the season wasn't Cobra Kai's best but that the episodes remained satisfying. Franich also wrote that Nichole Brown's absence in the season led to an "uneasy representational tilt". Melanie McFarland from Salon also felt the season declined from the previous two but still referred to it as a worthwhile viewing experience. Paul Tassi, a senior contributor for Forbes, said that the season "continues to defy the odds" by wrapping up previous plot points from The Karate Kid but also making continuous progress on new storylines. The Telegraph's Ed Power wrote in a similar review that the series will please the older and younger generations.

=== Awards and nominations ===
Following the season's release the series was nominated for Favorite Family TV Show at the 2021 Kids' Choice Awards on Nickelodeon, but the award was lost to Netflix's Stranger Things. For the 2021 MTV Movie & TV Awards, the series received a nomination for Best Show while a fight scene in the final episode earned a Best Fight nomination. Both awards were lost to WandaVision on Disney+. At the 27th Screen Actors Guild Awards, the season picked up a nomination for Outstanding Performance by a Stunt Ensemble in a Television Series which was lost to The Mandalorian, also on Disney+. During the 1st Hollywood Critics Association TV Awards the series gained a nomination for Best Streaming Series, Comedy. This nomination was ultimately awarded to Apple TV+'s Ted Lasso although Cobra Kai was granted an honorary award during the ceremony, known as the Legacy Award. An Outstanding Comedy Series nomination was gained for the 73rd Primetime Emmy Awards. Meanwhile, the finale episode, "December 19", picked up an additional three nominations from the 73rd Primetime Creative Arts Emmy Awards. These nominations included Outstanding Sound Editing for a Comedy or Drama Series (Half-Hour) and Animation, Outstanding Sound Mixing for a Comedy or Drama Series (Half-Hour) and Animation, and Outstanding Stunt Performance. Each of these awards were lost to Netflix's Love, Death & Robots, Ted Lasso, and The Mandalorian, respectively. Three other nominations for The Show of 2021, The Drama Show of 2021, and The Bingeworthy Show of 2021 were all received for the 2021 People's Choice Awards, which were lost to Loki, Grey's Anatomy, and Squid Game, respectively.

=== Viewing figures ===
Netflix reported in January 2021 that the series was on track for over 41 million households to have seen at least some of the season within the first 28 days of its release. (Note: Netflix counts a single viewer as any account holder who has viewed two continuous minutes of a title uninterrupted.) This caused the series to become the number one overall title on Netflix in 28 countries and holding a top ten slot in 85 countries. In addition, Cobra Kai was pushed to the top spot on two of Nielsen's weekly top ten lists for subscription-based platforms, the series held the top spot on the Top 10 Programs Overall and Top 10 Originals lists for the week of January 4–10, 2021. By the end of the first quarter in April, the total number of households had risen to 45 million.
