= Ali Mills (character) =

Fictional character from The Karate Kid franchise

- The Karate Kid character
- Elisabeth Shue as Ali Mills in The Karate Kid.
- First appearance: The Karate Kid; June 22, 1984
- Last appearance: "December 19"; Cobra Kai; January 1, 2021
- Created by: Robert Mark Kamen
- Portrayed by: Elisabeth Shue
- Voiced by: Jessica Rau (Cobra Kai 2: Dojos Rising)

In-universe information
- Gender: Female
- Occupation: Pediatric Surgeon
- Family: Mr. and Mrs. Mills (parents)
- Spouse: Dr. Gregory Schwarber (separated)
- Significant others: Daniel LaRusso (1984-1985); Johnny Lawrence (1982-1984)
- Children: Ava Schwarber (daughter); Lucas Schwarber (son)
- Nationality: American

Ali Mills is a fictional character portrayed by Elisabeth Shue in the film The Karate Kid (1984), and in the third season of its sequel series Cobra Kai (2021).

== Overview ==
=== Background ===
Ali Mills grew up in a wealthy family in Encino, Los Angeles. During high school in the early 1980s, she was a cheerleader who enjoyed playing games at a local arcade. Ali dated a rich kid named Johnny Lawrence for two years until they broke up in 1984. Shortly after the breakup, she began to date Daniel LaRusso who had just moved to Reseda, until they broke up after the Senior Prom in 1985. Ali was later a student at UCLA and then in medical school. She became a pediatric surgeon, and settled in Denver, Colorado with her husband, Dr. Gregory Schwarber (an oncologist whom she met in medical school). They had two children, Lucas and Ava.

In December 2018, Ali returned home and had a short reunion with Johnny, and later Daniel, revealing that she is currently in the process of divorcing Gregory. She reveals to Johnny that her parents are not happy about the upcoming divorce, joking they would want her to still marry someone “suitable” like Johnny.

== Young Ali Mills ==
=== High school relationship and breakup with Johnny ===
Johnny (in Cobra Kai) describes both his relationship with Ali and their 1984 breakup (events alluded to but not shown in The Karate Kid). In Season 1, Episode 8 of Cobra Kai, Johnny tells his student Miguel that he first met Ali in the Summer of 1982, when Johnny and his Cobra Kai friends went to see the movie Rocky III. They noticed a group of girls in front of them and one of his friends, Dutch, began to throw Milk Duds at them as an "alpha move". The girls became angry and one of them - Ali - got up and began yelling at Dutch, pouring her buttered popcorn all over him. Johnny said that was the first time he met Ali, and thought that she was a "firecracker". After turning Johnny down many times, Ali finally said yes to a date. Johnny took her to Golf N' Stuff, where they kissed on the Ferris wheel. He said that they were "madly in love" and dated for two years. Ali gave Johnny the black headband he wears in karate. However, the summer before senior year, they had a big fight. While Johnny thought they would "work things out", Ali met Daniel instead, and Johnny believed that she had cheated on him (when they were just friends at the time).

In Season 2, Episode 6 of Cobra Kai, Johnny and his friends (Bobby Brown, Jimmy and Tommy, who they helped to sneak out of the hospital for a 24-hour road trip) talk about his breakup with Ali: on the night that Dutch got so drunk that he smashed a dart board, Johnny also got so drunk that he missed Ali's birthday - ultimately leading up to the "big fight" that ended their relationship. Later that evening, Tommy confesses that he also had a crush on Ali (whom he met in homeroom during freshman year) but never had the courage to ask her out. After Johnny began dating her, Tommy was inspired to become a Cobra Kai so that he could gain Johnny's courage, although he got over Ali as he did not wish to have her come between him and a fellow Cobra. In turn, Johnny admits that he never got over Ali, though Johnny dated many women after her. Ali was the only one with whom Johnny was able to "let his guard down".

In Season 3, Episode 9 of Cobra Kai, Johnny and Ali reunite after he finds her on Facebook. After realizing that they have not seen each other since he lost the tournament (The Karate Kid), they catch up on the past three decades. Johnny apologizes to her for the mistakes he made while they were dating, and Ali tells him that she cannot even remember why they were angry with each other.

=== High school relationship and breakup with Daniel ===
Ali first notices Daniel at a beach party the day before the first day of senior year of high school (The Karate Kid). Daniel's friends tell him that she is "off-limits" because Ali is part of the rich clique. However, they bond when Daniel teaches her a few soccer moves. Johnny is infuriated when he sees Ali with Daniel (although Ali ended the relationship a few weeks prior, he did not believe it was over) and races his motorcycle into their conversation. Despite Ali repeatedly telling him to leave her alone, Johnny continues to insist she talk to him. Daniel tries to stick up for Ali and is badly beaten by Johnny, who is experienced in karate. Ali attempts to help him, but Daniel tells her that he is okay.

Daniel and Ali meet the next day at their high school on the soccer field as she prepares to attend cheerleading practice. It is during this conversation that she introduces herself as "Ali — with an 'I'", to which he responds that he is "Daniel — with an 'L'". While practicing with her teammates, Ali even looks on in concern as Daniel gets kicked out of soccer practice for getting into yet another fight with Johnny's friends for tripping him. As they continue to get to know each other, Daniel discovers that Johnny is Ali's ex-boyfriend (as of weeks). As her interest in Daniel deepens, Ali encourages him to stand up to Johnny, whom she feels is a bully and realizes is frequently beating Daniel up. She tells Daniel, "It's just that he [Johnny] thinks he can do whatever he wants to people". Ali also tells Daniel that she would "love to see him [Johnny] get a dose of his own medicine". Unfazed by Johnny's outbursts, Ali frequently tells him off or yells at him, and is angry that he will not leave her alone.

Ali's down-to-earth nature is highlighted during her first date with Daniel, when she is picked up by Daniel's mother Lucille in an old car that stalls. Not only does Ali immediately get along with Lucille, but willingly helps her and Daniel start the car up again. This interaction is a stark contrast with Ali's parents who interrogate Daniel when they meet him and are not impressed that he lives in Reseda rather than Encino. This difference in social class is further emphasized at the end of the date, when Daniel is teased by other teenagers because he is picked up by his mother in their old car (an incident that bothers him more than Ali).

Social class is further reinforced when Ali asks Daniel to meet her after dinner with her parents at an elite country club. Johnny, also at the club, tries to get her attention and is aided by Ali's parents (who snobbishly prefer Johnny to Daniel). However, Ali is hostile after she is made to dance with Johnny by her mother, and hits him in the face when Johnny forces a kiss on her (a move he made to infuriate Daniel who was watching in the kitchen). She yells at Johnny, "Don't you ever do that to me again!", and storms away. Daniel also attempts to run away but gets spaghetti spilled on himself after accidentally crashing into the kitchen staff.

A few days later, equipped with a driver's license and a car from Mr. Miyagi, Daniel finds Ali at the Arcade, and they argue as Daniel is angry over the kiss he witnessed and Ali is angry about the entire incident. Daniel accuses her of being a snob who is behaving badly because he isn't "rich with a fancy car". This statement infuriates Ali, as it contradicts her real nature, which she summarizes by telling Daniel: "You know, Daniel, I didn't go out with you because of a car or where you live ... I thought maybe you were different". She makes him understand that the discomfort with the class differences between them comes from him and not from her. Daniel also learns that Ali rejected Johnny's kiss, after her friend Susan tells him that Ali punched Johnny with "her right hook- you think she sprained her wrist doing her nails?" Daniel apologizes, and they kiss. Ali agrees to support him at the tournament the next day.

Ali arrives at the tournament with Daniel and Mr. Miyagi, and tells the officials that she needs to be at the ringside because she is Mr. Miyagi's translator. Since neither Daniel nor Miyagi know the actual rules of competitive karate, Ali quickly teaches Daniel what he needs to know before the competition begins. Daniel eventually proceeds to the finals and defeats Johnny. Ali rushes to hug Daniel afterward as the crowd celebrates his victory.

However, Daniel and Ali broke up six months later, with each character offering different reasons for the breakup.

- Daniel's version of the breakup:

In 1985, Daniel offers his version at the beginning of The Karate Kid Part II. He returns to Mr. Miyagi's house from the senior prom in the now badly beaten up car that Mr. Miyagi gave to him. As he enters the house, Mr. Miyagi says that it "must have been some senior prom" and asks him what happened. In response, Daniel exclaims angrily that he let Ali borrow his car and she ruined it. She later tells him she's just fallen in love with a football player from UCLA.

- Ali's version of the breakup:

A few decades later, Ali, who is in the Valley for the holidays, reunites with Daniel at a country club and meets his wife, Amanda. Ali, Johnny, Daniel, and Amanda then have dinner together, and Ali offers her version of their mutual experiences during high school. Amanda and Johnny are both interested in knowing the facts behind Ali and Daniel's breakup. Ali clarifies that it had nothing to do with Johnny, explaining that instead, she got into UCLA and met up with a male friend of hers who went there (which Daniel mistook as an affair). At this moment, Daniel interrupts Ali and sarcastically repeats the phrase, "your friend". Ali reaffirms that the guy was her friend, and then points out Daniel jumped to conclusions but concedes that she might have egged him on about their situation. Daniel becomes defensive and tells Ali he thought she was in love with the guy. Ali then reminds Daniel that she had warned him the brakes on Mr. Miyagi's car were faulty and asks if he claimed that Ali was responsible for the car crashing. Ashamed, Daniel lies, saying, "No, of course not."

=== Daniel and Johnny ===
In Season 1, Episode 1 of Cobra Kai, Johnny Lawrence and Daniel LaRusso meet accidentally after Johnny's car is towed to Daniel's auto business, 33 years after the events of The Karate Kid in August of 2017. Prosperous and successful Daniel appears happy to see him, while Johnny (who was just fired from his construction job and is living in a small apartment in Reseda, California) is very uncomfortable. Daniel introduces Johnny to his employees as a "guy who really had it in for me" when they were in high school. Johnny replies that he behaved that way because Daniel "move[d] in on my girl", referring to the fact that he and Ali had dated before she met Daniel. In response, Daniel asks, "She actually wasn't really your girl anymore, was she?", as Ali and Johnny had broken up shortly before Daniel met her at the beach.

== Adult Ali Mills ==
=== Season 1 ===
==== Episode 9 ====
Johnny and Daniel end up in a bar and begin to talk about their shared childhood over drinks. Daniel reveals to Johnny that Ali is currently a pediatric surgeon who has since moved to Denver with her husband Gregory Schwarber, an oncologist whom she met in medical school. Daniel says he has not seen Ali in decades, which Johnny thinks is odd because Daniel knows so much about someone he has not talked to in so long. Daniel explains he learned of Ali from her Facebook account, and learns that Johnny has no idea what Facebook is. Daniel opens up Facebook, explains how it works to Johnny, and shows him Ali's account. It displays her name as "Ali Mills Schwarber" and shows a picture of Dr. Schwarber (whom Daniel and Johnny make fun of). Daniel mentions that he did not send Ali a friend request, as he believes Amanda would frown on him reconnecting with ex-girlfriends, and does not see a purpose in doing so in the first place.

=== Season 2 ===
==== Episode 8 ====
One night while drinking in a bar, Johnny (who has since learned about Facebook and set up an account) types a Facebook message to Ali, which he hesitates to send as he thinks the message is too desperate. However, Johnny ends up pressing the send button accidentally (and without his knowledge) after someone bumps into him.

==== Episode 10 ====
After losing the Cobra Kai dojo to Kreese (who had a talk with the landlord, and finds out that the landlord does not like Johnny), and seeing his unconscious neighbor and star student Miguel Diaz on life support due to Miguel's spinal injuries accidentally caused by his estranged son Robby Keene at the end of the school fight, Johnny drives to the beach and throws his smart phone away into the sand in a fit of rage. Johnny is thus unaware that Ali has sent him a Facebook "friend request" in response to the message that he had unknowingly sent earlier.

=== Season 3 ===
==== Episode 5 ====
Miguel takes pictures of himself and Johnny at a concert and tells Johnny that he can see them on Facebook. When Johnny tells Miguel that he does not have Facebook anymore because he threw his phone away, Miguel explains to Johnny that he can access Facebook through his computer. Later, while working on his laptop, Johnny opens up Facebook to look at the concert photos and finally sees Ali's "friend request", which he accepts.

==== Episode 6 ====
After Johnny accepts her Facebook "friend request", Ali messages him via Facebook Messenger. She notes that lots of time has passed since high school, and says that she is happy with her family and career, and could "still kick your ass at air hockey". Ali also says that while they used to see each other every day in high school, she does not know anything about what Johnny is like now and wonders what he is up to.

Johnny initially composes a novel-length response in "all caps" (after "liking" all of her photos), a response which sends Miguel into a panic. He asks Johnny for photos so that they can develop a better Facebook Profile. After looking through Johnny's box of 1980's "pin-up" style photos of himself, Miguel decides that they should take contemporary pictures, and Johnny decides to base them on the kind of photos that Ali posts. However, Johnny ultimately posts pictures of himself with his karate students.

==== Episode 9 ====
Ali is visiting her parents for the holidays, and her mother asks her to attend the Christmas party at the country club, which Ali agrees to do. She had also responded to Johnny's Facebook message with a note saying that she is in town and that they should meet for lunch. During lunch, they realize they had not seen each other since Johnny’s defeat at the karate tournament (at the end of The Karate Kid).

Johnny confesses to Ali that he wasted his life, first during his 20s and 30s partying too much, and then after his girlfriend at the time became pregnant, Johnny was unable to cope with being a father. Ali also confesses that she has "messed up" many things in her life, because she was always playing a series of roles: "Ali the Good Doctor, Ali the Good Mom, Ali the Good Wife". Next, Ali reveals that she and her husband are separated and divorcing each other, but says that it is neither of their faults. Johnny apologizes for his behavior in high school and for the mistakes that he made in their relationship.

The two hang out at "Golf N' Stuff" like they used to, take selfies, discuss their children, and nearly kiss. However, Ali receives a phone call from her mother reminding her about the Christmas party, and she invites Johnny to join her. When Johnny arrives at the party at the country club, he sees Ali talking to Daniel.

==== Episode 10 ====
Ali at the holiday party (Cobra Kai, Season 3, Episode 10).

While Daniel is ordering drinks at the Christmas party, he hears a voice saying, "Daniel — with an 'L'". Daniel turns to see Ali, whom he has not seen since high school. They joke that it is funny to run into each other at the same country club that Daniel (the "kid from Reseda") was forced out of when he came to find Ali, and hug. At that moment, Johnny enters and almost has an accident with a waiter carrying bowls of spaghetti (all references to similar events in reverse in The Karate Kid).

Unaware that Daniel and Johnny had been in touch, Ali "reunites" them, but is soon witness to their continued rivalry. She meets Amanda, who somewhat sarcastically tells Ali about the "karate wars" between Daniel and Johnny. They bond over their mutual amusement over how absurd it seems.

Ali, Johnny, and Daniel then tell stories of high school over dinner. During this time, Ali reveals that what actually caused her breakup with Daniel was his jealousy over a college friend of hers (which Daniel mistook for a love affair). Ali also reveals that she did not crash Daniel's car, but instead that the brakes had gone out, something that Ali had tried to warn Daniel would happen. While Amanda is paying for dinner, Ali lectures Daniel and Johnny on their behavior by pointing out that they both share much more in common than they like to think. Ashamed, Daniel and Johnny both agree that they are at fault, and will try harder. Daniel again apologizes to Ali for the mistakes of the past as he says goodbye, and she tells Daniel that she tends to only think of the good times they had together.

Next, Ali says goodbye to Johnny. They talk about his relationship with Carmen (which Amanda told Ali about), and how happy Ali is for Johnny. As an act of closure, she tells him that it is good to visit the past, to know where you are now, but he has to move forward. Johnny agrees, saying that "we have to live for today" and Ali adds "and the future, whatever that might bring". Ali tells Johnny that she has faith in him and "will always be there for him". Ali pushes him towards his car saying, "So get out of here, you have a future to find". Johnny agrees and leaves to find Carmen, while Ali returns to the country club to find her parents.

== Commentary ==
Elisabeth Shue attended Wellesley College. She transferred to Harvard University in 1984, from which Shue withdrew to pursue her acting career (she was inspired by a friend to work in television commercials as a way to pay for college) one semester short of earning her degree (she eventually graduated in 2000). It was during this time that she auditioned for the part of Ali Mills in The Karate Kid. Among the younger cast members, Shue remembers Ralph Macchio [Daniel LaRusso] as someone who was considered "a big star compared to the rest of us. We were all like: Woah, he has a manager". Shue also recalls "being incredibly jealous that Ralph got to learn karate and I didn't. I made fun of him a little bit, like: I could kick your ass". In contrast, Shue was put through a different kind of physical conditioning for the beach scene: "I remember having to wear a bathing suit for that scene, which was a big deal because I felt so uncomfortable. When we first started filming, I was given a trainer (Jake Steinfeld, of Body by Jake fame) and asked to stay in shape".

Thirty-six years after the original film, Shue returned to the franchise during the final two episodes of the third season of Cobra Kai (although characters referred to her in Seasons 1 and 2). In 2019, Shue stated that "in Karate Kid 2, my character was kind of pushed aside in a way that didn’t feel so great. So it’s funny how the idea of Ali coming back [started]...at first, I thought, ‘Well, her character really left the world of The Karate Kid in a way that wasn’t so great...would people care about her coming back?’” She ultimately joined Cobra Kai due to the encouragement from director Dan Trachtenberg. She also decided to return because the writers planned to contest Daniel's version of the breakup in The Karate Kid II. Josh Heald, Jon Hurwitz and Hayden Schlossberg stated that they "didn't like [Daniel's reason]. Elisabeth didn't like that reason. So we tried to think of a way to make a way that didn't make Daniel out to be a liar but also gave Ali her own side of the story". Hurwitz also added that "hearing what happened at the start of that movie was such a bummer for us ... so we knew when we brought her on the show we would find a way to explain and get her side of the story". In addition, in chapter three of his 2022 memoir on Waxing On: The Karate Kid and Me, Ralph Macchio explores both Daniel's version of the breakup and his own personal lack of awareness at the time of the impact it had on Shue. He adds in an interview given after the release of the memoir that he "never looked at it from the perspective of Ali’s character or from the perspective of Elisabeth as an actor...as an older person, there was a recognition of missteps, of things I should have done differently." He also acknowledged that at that time, "women in movies were often thought to be disposable...I see that now. Then? I didn’t see it. It was a case of youth being wasted on the young. I was swept up in everything that was happening in my life."

Shue enjoyed her experience in Cobra Kai, stating that it was "like the movie never stopped... It just felt like our chemistry and our connections were exactly the same as they were". Zabka concurred noting that, "I think I lived everybody's fantasy of being Daniel LaRusso at Golf N' Stuff with Ali Mills on his arm … to kind of recreate those moments was so much fun and we just laughed the whole time. She's awesome, Elisabeth. We were good friends when we made [1984's The Karate Kid] and lost touch over the years. But it was just an instant chemistry". Macchio enjoyed the sense of closure that the reunion brought, such as the "moment where I come back and I want to apologize for years back and she cuts me off. When I turn to leave, it's such a genuine moment on her face and they put the Karate Kid little love story music under it, and it just really was an 'awww' moment for me. It sort of tied it up. I didn't know it when we shot it because I'm leaving and it was me turning away, and you just stay on her for that moment and there was a whole story in her eyes there that I thought really captured the heart of that sweet little adolescent romance from 36 years ago".
