= Kumiko (character) =

Fictional character from the Karate Kid franchise

Kumiko Tanaka
- The Karate Kid character
- Kumiko as she appears in The Karate Kid Part II
- First appearance: The Karate Kid Part II (1986)
- Last appearance: "Miyagi-Do" (Cobra Kai season 3) (2021)
- Created by: Robert Mark Kamen
- Portrayed by: Tamlyn Tomita

In-universe information
- Gender: Female
- Occupation: Dancer; Dance Teacher
- Family: Yukie (aunt)
- Significant other: Daniel LaRusso (briefly in 1985)
- Nationality: Japanese

Kumiko Tanaka is a fictional character portrayed by Tamlyn Tomita in the film The Karate Kid Part II (1986), and in the third season of the sequel series Cobra Kai (2021).

== Overview ==
Kumiko grew up in Tomi Village, in Okinawa Prefecture and was childhood friends with Chozen Toguchi. As a teenager, she lived with her Aunt Yukie and was a dance teacher for the young girls in the village. She had ambitions of being a professional dancer, but due to the lack of dance schools in the region & her reluctance to leave her home, she feels incapable of realizing that dream. After she falls in love with Daniel LaRusso, she develops a difficult relationship with Chozen. However, after Daniel defeats Chozen and he becomes suicidal, Kumiko (along with Sato) help Chozen to find purpose in life again.

She eventually joins the Hijikata Tatsumi Dance Company, and travels the world, only to return home to care for Aunt Yukie when she becomes sick. After Aunt Yukie passes away, Kumiko inherits her home, settles back in Okinawa, and becomes a dance teacher for children. While she had many marriage proposals, she never married or had children.

== The Karate Kid Part II ==
In 1985, Kumiko and her Aunt Yukie reside in Tomi Village in Okinawa Prefecture. She is first introduced to the audience when she welcomes Mr. Miyagi and Daniel LaRusso (who accompanies Miyagi) to her home upon their arrival to the village. This marked Miyagi's return to Okinawa for the first time in 45 years after learning that his father is dying from a letter delivered by Yukie, who has tended to his father's care during his final days. Her aunt was a love interest of Miyagi during their youth despite being arranged for marriage to Sato, a member of a wealthy family that grew up to be a rich industrialist and the village's landlord. The fallout from Sato's disgrace and his need to redeem his lost honor brought about a 45-year rivalry that rekindled upon Miyagi's return, yielding ripple effects on the village's livelihood at large, and specifically through Sato's nephew, Chozen Toguchi, who targets Daniel directly and Kumiko indirectly through escalating acts of harassment in defense of his family's honor.

While Miyagi is providing a tour of Tomi Village to Daniel, Kumiko is seen teaching young girls how to perform the O-bon dance, which is a Japanese way of honoring the dead, as part of a regular after-school dance program that she runs.

Daniel and Kumiko begin to spend time together. Kumiko teaches Daniel some o-bon dance moves one evening which elicits mockery from an onlooking Chozen Toguchi who compares it to geisha dancing. After beating Daniel for dishonoring him after he was exposed for cheating the villagers during his sharecropping collection, Kumiko tosses a tomato at Chozen's back as he walks away. This prompts Chozen to take off his stained shirt and toss it in front of Kumiko, lewdly uttering, "You keep for your collection! I know you like it!" As Kumiko and Daniel walk home after the assault, she tells him that Chozen has always been as abrasive and bereft of any sense of honor since they were kids. Upon arriving home, both see Yukie and Miyagi in the midst of a tea ceremony from afar which Kumiko explains to Daniel "means that they are falling in love again".

The following day, Kumiko shows Daniel around Naha city. While in the city, both view a TV screen from an electronics store window with a video of a ballerina dancing. Kumiko uses the video to express to Daniel her dream of becoming a dancer and travelling the world, although there are no dance schools where she lives. Later that evening, the two attend a 50's dance party. After sharing a dance to "Rock Around the Clock", Daniel asks Kumiko if she is arranged to marry anyone like her aunt Yukie was, but Kumiko informs him that it is an old custom and that she is free to marry anyone. In turn, Kumiko asks if Daniel is arranged for marriage, to which Daniel responds that he is a "free agent", meaning he is available. Daniel than holds her hand, indicating his romantic interest towards her, but Chozen arrives and wants his money back. He punches Daniel while one of Chozen's goons holds Kumiko, but Daniel beats him and takes his money back, then punches one of Chozen's goons as he escapes with Kumiko.

Back in Tomi Village, the feud between Miyagi and Sato escalates to the point of Daniel getting assaulted by Chozen and his men, prompting Miyagi to cut his visit short and make plans to leave Okinawa with Daniel the next day. A saddened Kumiko is seen dropping grains of rice into the shores of water as an offering to the gods in exchange for Daniel's quick return to the village, in adherence to an old custom of families doing this for their family members fishing overseas. In response, Daniel probes Kumiko about her dance school dream, trying to convince her to come back to the United States with him to pursue it. Kumiko expresses her reticence about leaving her home, which Daniel counters by saying "home is where you hang your hat". When Kumiko asks if she'd love it there and if America would love her back, Daniel responds, "Well, I know one part of it does". Later that evening, she and Daniel express their true feelings to one another by performing the same tea ceremony they witnessed performed between Yukie and Miyagi. The ceremony ends with a kiss, showing that the two are falling in love with each other.

The tea ceremony is abruptly stopped when a typhoon strikes the village. Everyone is forced to take cover but Sato is trapped when his shrine is leveled by the storm. Miyagi and Daniel rush to rescue him. After carrying Sato to safety, Daniel successfully rescues a little girl, who had been stranded on top of a bell tower. Sato orders Chozen to help, but when he refuses, Sato rushes to assist Daniel himself. He then disowns his nephew for refusing to assist, and an enraged Chozen runs off into the storm in disgrace. The next morning, as the villagers are rebuilding, Sato returns with his bulldozers to help rebuild the village. Sato hands over the land title to the village and asks for Miyagi's forgiveness, which he accepts. Daniel and Kumiko approach Sato about hosting the upcoming O-bon festival in a ceremonial castle, to which he agrees and invites Daniel to join in the celebration.

While Kumiko is performing a dance at the festival, a vengeful Chozen ziplines into the presentation, takes Kumiko hostage, and demands to fight Daniel to the death. Daniel accepts, and Kumiko makes an effort to intervene by choking Chozen with a piece of cloth before being knocked out by him. Daniel wins the fight, and he and Kumiko romantically embrace as the crowd cheers.

Daniel states in the beginning of The Karate Kid Part III that Kumiko was offered a dancing career in Tokyo that she could not refuse, much to Daniel and his mother's disappointment.

== Cobra Kai ==
=== Season 3 ===
==== Episode 4 ====
Kumiko in Cobra Kai

In 2018, after learning that his business rival Tom Cole has convinced Doyona Industries to cut their business ties with Daniel due to Robby's affiliation with Miyagi-Do and actions against Miguel at the end of the school brawl, he travels to Tokyo, Japan to try to persuade them not to. His attempt fails, however, prompting Daniel to travel to Okinawa and revisit old memories of Mr. Miyagi. He returns to Tomi Village to find that it has been turned into a mall and sees Kumiko dancing. When she completes her dance, she is surprised to see Daniel, whom she recognizes immediately.

Over tea, she tells Daniel that after graduation, she joined the Hijikata Tatsumi Dance Company, and traveled around the world. She said that London was her favorite place, because she got to see The Cranberries open for Radiohead in 1995. After returning to Okinawa to take care of Aunt Yukie, she started teaching. After Aunt Yukie died, Kumiko inherited her home (and does not want to sell it). She also said that Aunt Yukie wanted her to get married, but she preferred to be a "free agent", explicitly referencing Daniel's use of the term to her when they first met. When Daniel said that he was surprised that she didn't receive proposals, she said that "many tried, but none of them fought to the death for me". They both feel like time hasn't passed, when they realize it has been over 30 years. Kumiko notes that "maybe if we had Facebook and Instagram back then, we would've never lost touch".

They then talk about why Daniel came back to Okinawa. He says he has a wonderful family and career, but many things have been going wrong, and he used to always go to Mr. Miyagi for help. He wishes Mr. Miyagi were still here to guide him. Kumiko then states that she might be able to "make that happen". She takes him to Yukie's home and shows him a box of love letters from Mr. Miyagi to Yukie (which he began writing after they left Okinawa 30 plus years ago). Daniel almost breaks down when he finds a letter written the week Mr. Miyagi died. In the letter, Mr. Miyagi says that he was lost until he met Daniel, who is a "guiding light" for him. He says he is proud of Daniel (who has welcomed him into his family), and that Daniel is passing on Miyagi-do training to Samantha (and that he feels like Samantha's grandfather). Daniel finds great solace in the letter and thanks Kumiko.

The next day, Kumiko meets Daniel in a restaurant, and says that the letters she read to him the night before brought Mr. Miyagi back to life. She tells him that her aunt Yukie used to tell her that if you "put good out in the world, good will come back to you". She then says that while she knows he is facing a difficult moment with his business, things will work out. At that moment, his former rival, Chozen Toguchi, appears in the doorway.

==== Episode 5 ====
Daniel's former rival, Chozen, approaches Daniel and Kumiko, and bows. The three then sit together in awkward silence, as Chozen says that he never married and has no children. When he leaves to get a drink for Daniel, Kumiko confesses that she invited him to meet Daniel. When he reminds Kumiko that Chozen once fought him to the death while also threatening her life, she tells him that it was a long time ago and Chozen has changed. As Daniel is skeptical that people can change, Kumiko says that it looks like they have a lot to talk about and she leaves them to spend the day together. Daniel comes to learn that Kumiko is right; Chozen has changed and is following a more productive path, serving as a Karate instructor for Miyagi-Do karate in Okinawa. The two reconcile, and he teaches Daniel a special technique that will eventually save his life towards the end of Season 3.

As Daniel is leaving, Kumiko tells him that she hopes they both he and Chozen learned something from each other (which he realizes was her plan). She then introduces the woman standing next to her as "a friend of ours". When Daniel doesn't recognize her, she tells him not to worry, it's been a long time and says "I was a child then, and it was during a typhoon". Daniel realizes that she is Yuna, the girl he rescued decades ago. While getting to know each other again, he finds out that she is Senior Vice President of Sales for Doyona International. He turns to Kumiko and looks at her with appreciation as she reminds him of Aunt Yukie's saying: "Put good out into the world, and good will come back to you". Daniel then asks Yuna if he can buy her a drink, to which she responds: "I should hope so. I'm about to save your business".

=== Season 5 ===
==== Episode 9 ====
While talking with Johnny Lawrence, Chozen reveals that he has been in love with Kumiko for a long time. When Daniel asks about this confession, Chozen says that when he and Kumiko were children, they would play together. After Daniel defeated him, Chozen became suicidal and felt ashamed of his actions. In addition to the support of Sato, Kumiko helped him recover. Chozen has never told Kumiko how he feels as he believes that his actions towards her are unforgivable.

Daniel reassures Chozen that he's redeemed himself for the things that he did, and that Kumiko knows it, too. After Daniel encourages Chozen to pursue a relationship with Kumiko, he leaves the restaurant and calls her. He tells Kumiko that his one mistake when coming to America was not taking her with him (much like Miyagi and Yukie), before getting nervous and hanging up.

=== Season 6 ===
Chozen is depressed when Kumiko never returns his calls. He later books a flight to Okinawa to see her. However, when he arrives to her home to see her, he is heartbroken when a man in a towel answers the door, implying she is dating this man.

Weeks later, back at Miyagi-Do, he finally receives a letter from Kumiko, telling Chozen she loves him as a friend only and she's in love with someone else.

== Commentary ==
Tamlyn Tomita attended UCLA, where she studied history and planned to become a history teacher. While a junior at UCLA, she participated in Nisei Week (where she was crowned its 1984 queen). It was during this time that she responded to "Helen Funai, a former 1963 queen of the pageant and also a dancer, actress, singer", who made a request that she audition for a part in The Karate Kid II. She promised her parents that she would finish UCLA and then explore acting.

Tomita later noted that "when I did the film in 1985, I was a nobody. I knew nothing about moviemaking or storytelling or political correctness or authentic representation of one's culture, especially when it comes from my own particular culture". She also said, the tea ceremony scene drew upon her college coursework: "When I was at UCLA there was a once-in-a-lifetime opportunity to take a class in Urasenke-style tea ceremony. I was studying Japanese history at the time. I thought this would be fun. I took that course in 1984. When I auditioned for Karate Kid in 1985, I told them I had taken a tea ceremony class and they thought I was lying and I went, 'No, I know the tea ceremony!'" She noted that at that time, she was an absolute novice and that "Pat [Morita] and Ralph and Nobu [McCarthy] and Yuji [Okumoto], those actors taught me everything I know. [Director] John Avildsen taught me everything I needed to know in terms of the story and the arc. Robert Kamen, the writer, he was always open to talking about his experience in Okinawa, and that contrast and comparison to my family -- my mom's family being from Okinawa. I was literally learning and working on the job at the same time".

Macchio, who portrays Daniel LaRusso, advocated for the return of Kumiko and Chozen Toguchi in Cobra Kai. When she was asked to return during Season 3, Tomita states that she said, "I would love to, this would be so fun, but the only caveat is that because I'm older, because I'm a little bit more knowledgeable and I'm going to fight for it anyway — I need to be able to inject a truer picture of Okinawa. Because I didn't know anything back then, and the only sense of Okinawa [in The Karate Kid Part II] is coming through [screenwriter] Robert Mark Kamen's interpretation of his time spent in Okinawa. I know Pat [Morita] did as much as he could, but he's a [second generation] Nisei of Japanese descent, which is different". Tomita states that Cobra Kai's writers were open to having her involved in the development of Kumiko and "rectifying the portrayal of Okinawa" and was given the "red carpet treatment". Tomita asked for (and was given) the script in advance so that she could "translate things from Japanese to hōgen, or Uchinanchu, which is the Okinawan dialect". She also met with the Okinawa Association of America, in order to get "the correct Okinawan choreography to 'Tinsagu nu Hana', which is the song that me and my mom made up the dance to in Karate Kid II because I wasn't choreographed for that section of the film". Tomita also notes that working with Macchio again was "like slipping on a favorite pair of socks, or a beloved pair of shoes that still fit, that still are comfortable, and they still look good. [Laughs] That's the important part. It was so easy". She also said that "it was a joyful, wondrous feeling to step into those shoes again with Ralph. It makes me cry because we all collectively missed Pat. Without Pat, this world really wouldn't have existed. That's what is a credit to those Three Amigos [the writers]". Tomita remembers that Macchio was helpful and supportive during the original audition. Macchio also commented on the decision to return to Daniel's relationship with Kumiko in Cobra Kai, stating that he "always felt that I wanted to go back, I wanted to explore what happened to Daniel and Kumiko because I always felt if I ever went back to this well -- this is for years, decades on end -- it's a story that was just kind of dropped... The Karate Kid III was something else. So it never made sense completely to me why Miyagi wouldn't have gone back to Yukie and why Daniel and Kumiko might not have had [a chance]. You had 30 years so I said 'Let's fill in those blanks'".
