= Chozen Toguchi =

Fictional character from The Karate Kid franchise

- The Karate Kid character
- Chozen Toguchi as he appears in The Karate Kid Part II
- First appearance: The Karate Kid II (1986)
- Last appearance: "Ex-Degenerate"; Cobra Kai; February 13, 2025
- Portrayed by: Yuji Okumoto; Shigi Ohtsu (young)

In-universe information
- Title: Sensei
- Occupation: Karate instructor (sensei)
- Affiliation: Miyagi-Do karate in Okinawa
- Fighting style: Goju-ryu
- Family: Sato (uncle, deceased); Unnamed Father (deceased)
- Nationality: Ryukyuan people

Chozen Toguchi is a fictional character in The Karate Kid franchise, who appears as the main antagonist of the motion picture The Karate Kid Part II (1986), and a supporting character (beginning with Season 3) of the series Cobra Kai (2021). He is portrayed by Yuji Okumoto, whose performance has received widespread acclaim.

In The Karate Kid Part II, the character is introduced as the nephew of Mr. Miyagi's best friend-turned-rival Sato, who comes into conflict with Daniel LaRusso throughout the film, eventually challenging him to a fight to the death, with Daniel overcoming him and ultimately sparing his life.

In Cobra Kai, an adult Chozen is shown to have repented for his past mistakes, and he makes amends with Daniel when the latter visits Okinawa during a trip to Japan, ultimately becoming a friend. Chozen then comes to the United States to help Daniel take down the aggressive karate dojo Cobra Kai, frequently misunderstanding American customs, and later fighting Cobra Kai sensei Terry Silver head-on. He eventually becomes a sensei of Miyagi-Do, where he helps the dojo fight in the global karate tournament, the Sekai Taikai.

== Overview ==
Chozen Toguchi grew up in Tomi Village, in Okinawa Prefecture, and was raised by his Uncle Sato. It is implied that his father committed suicide when he was young. He and Kumiko were also childhood friends who used to play together. He also studied Karate under Sato, who was himself a student of Mr. Miyagi's father.

As a child, Chozen would cheat during his Uncle Sato's Karate lessons. As a teenager, Chozen was quick-tempered, had difficulties with Kumiko, and was Daniel's rival (The Karate Kid Part II). After his defeat, he was suicidal, but Sato and Kumiko helped him to recover and find purpose.

As an adult, Chozen became the Sensei for Miyagi-Do karate in Okinawa (which he inherited after Sato died). He is on friendly terms with Kumiko and has romantic feelings for her. He never married and does not have children.

== Early life ==
Chozen was raised by his Uncle Sato, as his father died when he was young. Early in his childhood, he was trained by Sato in Miyagi-Do Karate and quickly became his best student in his dojo. One day, Sato was holding a training session in which he had to repeatedly bang their fingertips into a bucket of sand. However Sato realizes that Chozen is cheating as he has placed a small pillow in the sand to soften the blow. Sato throws the pillow out and calls Chozen a coward telling him that "a man without honor is no man", and asking him whether he is a coward or a man. As he turns away, Chozen sneaks the pillow back into the sand and continues the drill. He also developed a friendship with Kumiko, a girl from Tomi Village, as they played hide and seek games together; Kumiko would always find him. As he grew older, however, he became more dishonorable and quick-tempered.

== The Karate Kid Part II ==
In 1985, Daniel LaRusso and Mr. Miyagi arrive at Tomi Village (Okinawa) as Mr. Miyagi's father is dying. He tells Daniel that when he was young, he fell in love with a woman named Yukie, who was arranged to marry Sato (his childhood best friend, the son of the richest man in the village, and fellow karate student of his father). Upon announcing his intentions to marry Yukie, Sato challenged him to a fight to the death to save his honor. Rather than fight, however, Mr. Miyagi left the country, though Sato is still holding a grudge.

In Okinawa, Mr. Miyagi and Daniel are greeted by Chozen, who takes them to meet Sato rather than to the village. Sato then threatens Mr. Miyagi, who dismisses it. Sato then allows them to go so that Mr. Miyagi can see his father, but after that he will return. Arriving at the village, Miyagi and Daniel are welcomed by Yukie and her niece Kumiko, and discover that Sato owns and runs the village. Mr. Miyagi also discovers that Yukie never married Sato because she still loves him.

After Miyagi's father dies, Sato gives him three days to mourn out of respect before their fight. Mr. Miyagi shows Daniel the secret to his family's karate - a handheld drum that illustrates the "drum technique", a block-and-defense karate move that Daniel begins to practice. Some time later, Daniel accidentally exposes corruption in Chozen's grocery business. Chozen accuses Daniel of insulting his honor and begins to harass him. After several encounters, their feud comes to a head when Chozen vandalizes the Miyagi family property and attacks Daniel. Daniel and Mr. Miyagi decide to leave and return to the U.S., but Sato threatens to destroy the village if Mr. Miyagi doesn't fight him, so a date is set. However, a typhoon cancels the fight, and Daniel and Mr. Miyagi rescue Sato, effectively ending the feud. When Sato sees a young girl trapped in the bell tower, he tells Chozen to help Daniel rescue her. As Chozen is too reluctant to do so due to his resentment towards Daniel, Sato helps Daniel rescue her instead and disowns Chozen who runs out into the storm.

The next day, Daniel and Kumiko approach Sato about hosting the upcoming O-bon festival in a ceremonial castle, to which he agrees and invites Daniel to join in the celebration. While Kumiko is performing a dance at the festival, Chozen ziplines into the presentation, takes Kumiko hostage, and demands to fight Daniel. Mr. Miyagi reminds Daniel that this isn't a tournament, this is for real and to the death. Daniel still agrees to go.

After an intense fight, Chozen overwhelms Daniel. Miyagi, Sato and the crowd respond by using handheld drums they brought to the celebration, inspiring Daniel. Seemingly confused, Chozen closes in for the kill, but Daniel is able to deflect Chozen's attacks and land counter-attacks using the drum technique. Daniel grabs the vanquished Chozen and threatens to end his life by saying, "Live or die, man?!" Chozen chooses death, but, remembering the way Miyagi handled Kreese earlier, Daniel honks Chozen's nose and drops him to the ground.

== Cobra Kai ==
=== Season 3 ===
==== Episode 4 ====
In 2018, after Daniel learns that his business rival Tom Cole has convinced Doyona Industries to cut their business ties with LaRusso Auto Group due to Daniel's reputation being tarnished by Robby's affiliation with Miyagi-Do and actions against Miguel during the school brawl, he travels to Tokyo, Japan to try to persuade them not to. His attempt fails, however, prompting Daniel to travel to Okinawa and revisit old memories of Mr. Miyagi. He returns to Tomi Village to find that it has been turned into a mall and sees Kumiko dancing. They meet for tea and catch up on the past few decades. Daniel confides in Kumiko and tells her of his troubles with Doyona, as well as his loss of confidence in general.

The next day Kumiko meets Daniel. While they talk in a bar, Chozen appears in the doorway.

==== Episode 5 ====
Chozen in Cobra Kai

Chozen approaches Daniel and Kumiko, and bows. The three then sit together in awkward silence, as Chozen says that he never married and has no children. When he leaves to get a drink for Daniel, Kumiko confesses that she invited him to meet Daniel, saying that he has changed since they last met. She then leaves them to spend the day together.

Chozen takes Daniel to a mountain top, and Daniel recognizes it as the place where Karate was born through Miyagi Shimpo sensei. Daniel then tells the story that Mr. Miyagi told him, of Miyagi Shimpo sensei traveling to China and returning 10 years later with the "secret" of Miyagi-Do Karate. While Daniel is confident that Mr. Miyagi taught him everything, Chozen is skeptical and asks Daniel to follow him.

They arrive at the Miyagi-Do Dojo where Daniel finds original scrolls containing the family techniques. Chozen explains that Mr. Miyagi's father taught Sato, who then taught him. After Sato died, Chozen inherited all of the Miyagi family artifacts. However, Chozen suddenly takes the scroll from Daniel's hand, saying that Daniel is a foreigner who cannot take their secrets. When Daniel says that Mr. Miyagi treated him like a son, Chozen challenges him to a fight to see how much Daniel really knows. Daniel is then surprised to find himself beaten when Chozen uses unknown techniques, and Chozen tells him that Mr. Miyagi did not teach him everything.

Chozen then tells Daniel the real story behind Miyagi-Do Karate. Centuries ago, the Miyagi ancestors were at war with Japanese invaders, so they designed their own techniques designed to kill their enemies. Chozen suspects that Mr. Miyagi thought that Daniel would not be able to learn the more deadlier aspects that seemed to defy Mr. Miyagi's "self-defense" approach.

As they continue to fight, Chozen uses techniques that disable Daniel's arms and legs, leaving Daniel at his mercy. He tells Daniel that he has waited a long time for getting payback on Daniel, but instead comically honks his nose (a reference to when Daniel honked Chozen's in The Karate Kid Part II). Chozen then drops all pretense of anger and Daniel realizes that it was all a facade, as Chozen adopts a friendlier demeanor. He then explains to Daniel that the move he used was a pressure point technique and agrees to teach him these techniques. He tells Daniel: "If an enemy insists on war, then you take away their ability to wage it".

As they say goodbye, Daniel is utterly amazed at his new perspective of Miyagi-Do Karate, and says he understands why Mr. Miyagi never taught it to him. Chozen praises Mr. Miyagi, says he hopes he will be like him, and becomes overcome with guilt when he recalls his actions and how he treated Daniel three decades ago. He says that after their fight, he was suicidal, only rescued by the encouragement of Sato to prove himself, and that is what he has been doing ever since, becoming a sensei in Okinawa and passing on the teaching of Miyagi Do to his students. Daniel then says that he forgives him for the events of the past, and Chozen is grateful for it. He then offers Daniel the scroll, telling him "You keep for your collection" (a callback to when he said the same thing to Kumiko, though in a lascivious context, during Karate Kid II).

At the end of Season 3, Daniel saves his own life by using these techniques against a surprise and murderous attack from Kreese.

=== Season 4 ===
==== Episode 10 ====
After Miyagi-Do and Eagle Fang Karate lose to Cobra Kai in the 2019 All-Valley Karate Tournament, Daniel decides to go back on his previous deal to shut down Miyagi-Do and decides to go on the offensive to get the dojo shut down. While visiting Miyagi's grave, it is revealed that Chozen has willingly teamed up with Daniel and they bow to Mr. Miyagi's grave.

=== Season 5 ===
==== Episode 1 ====
Daniel has Chozen live in his house as they figure out a way to prevent Terry Silver's Cobra Kai from taking over the Valley. After being introduced to Terry Silver, Chozen asks Daniel to take him to the new Cobra Kai dojo. While Chozen did not personally experience what Daniel did back in 1985, he realizes that Silver is a student of Kim Sun-Yung, a master of Tang Soo Do while watching him spar against an opponent. However, he knows that Kim Sun-Yung taught a different method, one which he explains to Daniel is based on deception, without honor or mercy, a style considered controversial by other martial artists including Sato. When Daniel is surprised that Mr. Miyagi never told him about any of this, Chozen tells him that because Miyagi left during World War II, he would not have known about Kim-Sun Yung, who only came to public notice during the Korean War. Thus, Chozen knows that Silver is very dangerous. The two then concoct a plan to expose Silver, which involves him posing as a local sensei that Silver is looking to hire.

==== Episode 2 ====
Chozen introduces himself to Silver using the name Jokichi Tatsuya, nicknamed "Sensei Joe", a local sensei originating from Kyoto. He works with Tory, but senses that her heart is not in it. She then asks him why he is a sensei, to which Chozen replies, "honor". Tory is surprised and asks if that is the only reason, to which Chozen replies that honor is everything. He then tells Silver that he is training Tory and that as a teacher his task is to train the mind and then body. He also tells Tory that if she wants to break free of troubles she must face them directly. Chozen then does a demonstration which leads Silver to ask if he knows Tang Soo Do. Chozen says that he does and receives an invitation to dinner at Silver's mansion.

Daniel helps him prepare for the dinner, but is nervous. He says that Silver is a man without honor. Chozen understands and says that when he was young, Sato tried to teach him about honor, but at the time he wasn't ready as he was a coward who had no honor himself.

During dinner, Silver confirms Chozen's suspicion that his karate master was Kim Sun-Yung. Chozen tells him that he was raised by his uncle as his father died when he was young, implied to have been by suicide. Silver slowly seduces Chozen into letting his guard down, inadvertently blowing his cover when Silver suggests a toast; Chozen says "Karii", the Okinawan term for cheers instead of "Kanpai", the Japanese word for cheers.

The next day in the dojo, Silver reveals that he knows Chozen's true identity due to this mistake, and has the remaining senseis attack him. Chozen easily defeats all of them within minutes. He then turns to Silver and threatens him to leave Miyagi-Do and the LaRusso family alone or he will fight back.

==== Episode 3 ====
Daniel takes Chozen, Louie, and Anoush for a game of golf at the country club which Chozen easily wins. Terry suddenly appears at the club and warns Daniel to stop interfering with Cobra Kai. Terry then tells him that if he continues, he is playing with fire. Chozen looks directly at Terry and makes a comical remark that he is gasoline. Silver leaves confused.

The next day at Miyagi-Do, Daniel and Chozen try to figure out what to do. Since Silver said he has many people to call, Chozen suggests that they contact these people first. Daniel immediately thinks of Mike Barnes. They then go to Mike's house where Daniel tells Chozen about his past with Mike Barnes. They follow him to his place of work, a furniture store in Agoura Hills and Chozen waits in the car while Daniel goes to investigate inside.

Unbeknownst to Chozen, Barnes had turned his life around, is married, and turns out to be the owner of the store. He also took responsibility for what happened in 1985 and apologized to Daniel. Worried when Daniel doesn't appear, Chozen goes inside and sees what he thinks is a fight, when in reality Mike and Daniel are joking about a re-match. Chozen then attacks Barnes and his workers, until Daniel finally stops the fight and apologizes to Mike. Chozen tells Mike that the couch that they are sitting on is very comfortable and Mike offers it for $2000 even though the price is $1200 due to Chozen attacking him and his staff.

==== Episode 4 ====
While Daniel and Amanda go to an auction, Chozen stays at home to keep a watch on the house. He also becomes deeply involved in the reality series, 90 Day Fiancé, while doing so.

==== Episodes 5 and 6 ====
When Amanda leaves town over Daniel's agenda against Silver, Chozen suggest they track down Raymond "Stingray" Porter over supposedly lying about his assault based on a newspaper clipping, but Stingray is uncooperative. This results in Daniel destroying some of Stingray's property until Chozen points out that he won't speak because he is afraid. When Daniel decides to give up his vendetta, Chozen plans to head back to Japan, but he cancels his trip when Silver brutalizes Daniel. When Daniel decides to give up, Chozen teams up with Johnny to take on one of Silver's new Cobra Kai senseis, but flee when Kim Da-Eun, who is the grand-daughter of Kim Sun-Yung, shows up with the other senseis. They realize they need Daniel to help them fight, so they arrange all of the Miyagi-do and Eagle Fang students to inspire Daniel to carry on.

==== Episode 7 ====
Daniel and Johnny go to visit Kreese in prison. Chozen gives the students an exercise by giving each of them an egg for them to protect. Chozen is successful at breaking all of their eggs so he forces them to do the lesson again. Anthony gets the idea to put all of the eggs in a basket and work as a team to protect them, successfully fending off Chozen. He then explains that the exercise was meant to provide an advantage over Cobra Kai in their defense.

==== Episode 9 ====
While out at a club with Daniel, Johnny, Amanda, and Carmen to celebrate Carmen's pregnancy, Chozen gets drunk and lets slip to Johnny that he has feelings for Kumiko. Johnny relays those feelings to Daniel, who learns that Kumiko was the one who helped Chozen reconnect with Sato. Daniel encourages Chozen to let her know. Chozen leaves a drunken voicemail confessing his feelings and saying that he should have brought her with him to the United States. While in a party limo en route to another bar with Daniel and Johnny, Chozen finds the car doors to be locked when they seem to be going in the wrong direction and suspects that Silver has kidnapped them.

==== Episode 10 ====
In the highway, Barnes is revealed to be the hijacker, who wants revenge over his life being ruined after his furniture store was burned, even accusing him, Johnny and Daniel if they're at fault even though they didn't. When they explain that Silver was responsible, Barnes suggests they get payback on him, which Chozen and Johnny agree to, while Daniel refuses to, and leave him behind in the middle of the freeway. At Silver's house, Barnes is quickly knocked out and Johnny fights the other Cobra Kai senseis. Chozen faces off against Silver in hand-to-hand combat and later weapons, Chozen a pair of sais and Silver a katana. Chozen is able to knock Silver down and is about to kill him when he is distracted by Johnny's screams, allowing Silver to slice Chozen's back and seemingly leave him for dead. However, he is later rescued by Barnes and Johnny, who defeat the other senseis. Chozen ultimately survives and is put into an ambulance, being helped out by Barnes and Johnny just as they arrive at the Cobra Kai Encino dojo where Terry Silver had recently been defeated by Daniel and arrested for his crimes.

=== Season 6 ===
Chozen spends the summer in the LaRusso household and the massive wound on his back inflicted by Terry Silver's katana required him to get 80 stitches. After making a full recovery, he aids Johnny and Daniel in training their students for the Sekai Taikai tournament, which will take place in Barcelona, Spain. He tries to keep the order whenever Daniel and Johnny disagree on something related to their dojo, such as its official name or each other's opposing training methods. Chozen, Daniel and Amanda discover a box with numerous of Mr. Miyagi's belongings, one of which is an old and rusty headband that reveals Mr. Miyagi was captain of Miyagi-Do during the Sekai Taikai in the 1940s. Before Daniel, Johnny and their six best students depart to Barcelona for the tournament, Chozen schedules a flight to Okinawa to reunite with Kumiko.

Much to his shock, Kumiko is revealed to have already found a boyfriend, causing Chozen to go on a downward spiral and drown his sorrow in alcohol. He eventually reunites with his co-senseis and their students in Barcelona and manages to recover from his heartbreak in order to help the students regain focus in the competition. He secretly has one-night stand with Kim Da-Eun despite their dojos being rivals and the two of them join Kreese and Daniel as they discover Terry Silver had been freed from prison and become the business partner of Sensei Wolf and his formidable dojo, the Iron Dragons, to get his vengeance on Daniel, Johnny and Miyagi-Do for his downfall. Though Miyagi-Do eventually manages to take Cobra Kai out of the competition thanks to the students' full focus, mutual trust and impressive teamwork, Kreese, Kim Da-Eun and their students receive another chance when Russian dojo Tiger Strike is eliminated for the use of performance-enhancement drugs.

During the male captains match between Robby and Iron Dragon Axel Kovacevic, Senseis Ivanov and Oksana lead their Tiger Strike students back into the competition, knock out representative Gunther and his fellow chiefs and ignite an all-out war between dojos. Chozen joins forces with Kim Da-Eun to take down the Tiger Strike senseis and the madness comes to an end when Cobra Kai top student Kwon Jae-Sung fatally stabs himself by accident with Kreese's eunjangdo dagger.

Weeks later, at Miyagi-Do, Chozen receives a letter from Kumiko who tells him that she loves him as a friend only and she's in love with someone else, leaving Chozen heartbroken. To cheer him up, Daniel and Amanda take him out for wine tasting and introduce him to their friend, Winnie Taylor. Winnie ensures Chozen there is somebody special out there for him, which Chozen confesses there is. He witnesses the untimely marriage of Johnny and Carmen, as well as the birth of their daughter, Laura.

In the series finale, he and former rival-turned-friend, Kim Da-Eun, who is now reformed, become a couple.

== Commentary ==
Yuji Okumoto had appeared in the films Real Genius and Better Off Dead before appearing in The Karate Kid Part II as Chozen Toguchi. The experience stayed with him, as he noted that "when you play such an iconic bad guy in a successful film, you kind of keep that memory always with you. You always wonder what happened to this character, where did he go after this all went down, where he lost his honor and all that stuff…I never forgot about Chozen, because he was a big part of my life".

Okumoto received a call in September 2019 asking if he was interested in joining Cobra Kai. While he had hoped that Chozen would be written into the narrative, he was concerned with "how Chozen would be portrayed". He wanted to make certain that "the character is well-written, well-developed…that they paid deference to the character and his development. So they sent me the script and initially I thought it needed a little work. But I gave a little bit of input and the writers and also the producers, they really did a great job in capturing the essence of Chozen and how he would probably be after 30-odd years". Okumoto was pleased by the investment of the writers in his perspective on the character, noting that "they actually took the notes and incorporated into developing the character. And they really had a great grasp on the direction, which made my job lot easier". He also thinks that "Chozen has gone through a lot of soul searching after losing his fight with Daniel. I think that he saw the light, and — this is just my take — I think through the dedication that he put into getting back into martial arts for the right reasons, I think he started to understand what the true meaning of martial arts is, and what the true meaning of honor is". Okumoto also enjoyed working with Ralph Macchio again, saying that "it's like reuniting with an old friend… I can't say enough about how fortunate I was to be brought onto the show and to be reunited with him". He further stated that "it felt like we're back on the set of Karate Kid II. Working with Ralph especially, he's just so professional. No ego, you conversate [sic] and have a good time, and reminisce about a lot of this stuff. And we talked about, you know, our kids, family stuff. And so it was really a wonderful experience". Regarding Chozen, Okumoto says that he "wanted him to evolve as a character… [and] didn't want him just to be there as a person to push the story along. I wanted him to go through a journey, to go through a soul-searching".
