= Cobra Kai season 2 =

Cobra Kai
- Season 2
- Promotional poster
- Showrunners: Josh Heald; Jon Hurwitz; Hayden Schlossberg
- Starring: Ralph Macchio; William Zabka; Courtney Henggeler; Xolo Maridueña; Tanner Buchanan; Mary Mouser; Jacob Bertrand; Gianni DeCenzo; Martin Kove
- No. of episodes: 10

Release
- Original network: YouTube Premium
- Original release: April 24, 2019

Season chronology
- ← Previous; Season 1 Next → Season 3

The second season of Cobra Kai, stylized as Cobra KaII, was released on YouTube Premium on April 2, 2019, and consisted of 10 episodes. The series is a sequel to the original films of The Karate Kid franchise, focusing on the characters of Daniel LaRusso and Johnny Lawrence over 30 years after the original film. This is the final season to be originally released on YouTube's streaming service as Netflix would acquire the streaming rights to Cobra Kai following YouTube's decision not to renew the series past a third season.

Picking up immediately where the previous season left off, the season follows Johnny after his victory at the All-Valley as his success with Cobra Kai is juxtaposed against two new threats: a new karate dojo started by Daniel known as Miyagi-Do, as well as the return of Cobra Kai founder John Kreese.

The season had nine starring roles, six of which returned from the first season and the other three consisting of previously recurring and guest cast members, Jacob Bertrand, Gianni DeCenzo, and Martin Kove, all of whom received promotions. Leo Birenberg and Zach Robinson composed a soundtrack album to accompany the season. The season received generally positive reviews from critics, although they deemed it to be inferior to the first season. The season also received multiple awards and nominations including an Emmy award, and achieved record setting viewing figures.

== Cast and characters ==
=== Main ===
- Ralph Macchio as Daniel LaRusso
- William Zabka as Johnny Lawrence
- Courtney Henggeler as Amanda LaRusso
- Xolo Maridueña as Miguel Diaz
- Tanner Buchanan as Robby Keene
- Mary Mouser as Samantha LaRusso
- Jacob Bertrand as Eli "Hawk" Moskowitz
- Gianni DeCenzo as Demetri Alexopoulos
- Martin Kove as John Kreese

=== Recurring ===
- Vanessa Rubio as Carmen Diaz
- Nichole Brown as Aisha Robinson
- Paul Walter Hauser as Raymond "Stingray" Porter
- Aedin Mincks as Mitch
- Khalil Everage as Chris
- Hannah Kepple as Moon Taylor
- Owen Morgan as Bert
- Dan Ahdoot as Anoush Norouzi
- Peyton List as Tory Nichols
- Nathaniel Oh as Nathaniel

=== Notable guests ===
- Griffin Santopietro as Anthony LaRusso
- Diora Baird as Shannon Keene
- Susan Gallagher as "Homeless" Lynn
- Ken Davitian as Armand Zarkarian
- Kim Fields as Sandra Robinson
- Terayle Hill as Trey
- Jeff Kaplan as Cruz
- Rob Garrison as Tommy
- Ron Thomas as Bobby Brown
- Tony O'Dell as Jimmy
- Randee Heller as Lucille LaRusso
- Rose Bianco as Rosa Diaz
- Selah Austria as Piper Elswith

== Episodes ==
Cobra Kai season 2 episodes
No. overall	No. in season	Title	Directed by	Written by	Original release date
11	1	"Mercy Part II"	Jon Hurwitz & Hayden Schlossberg	Josh Heald & Jon Hurwitz & Hayden Schlossberg	April 24, 2019
Following a brief fight, Kreese tries to convince Johnny to allow him to rejoin Cobra Kai, but Johnny refuses due to their past, particularly Kreese assaulting Johnny as punishment for losing the 1984 All-Valley Tournament to Daniel. (Note: As depicted in The Karate Kid Part II (1986)) Carmen notices Miguel's darker nature during the fight but still approves of Johnny training him. Robby learns about the history of Miyagi-Do, and Daniel plans to open up a dojo, to his wife's reluctance, as Johnny scolds Miguel and Hawk on their dishonorable techniques at the tournament. Daniel brings Sam into his karate dojo, while Johnny tries to patch things up with Robby. However, Robby, who believes Johnny had his students fight dirty against him, humiliatingly rejects him by claiming that Daniel is a better man than Johnny ever was. Kreese finally apologizes and convinces Johnny to let him join Cobra Kai as an assistant sensei.
12	2	"Back in Black"	Jon Hurwitz & Hayden Schlossberg	Josh Heald & Jon Hurwitz & Hayden Schlossberg	April 24, 2019
Miguel tries reaching out to Sam to no avail while Daniel begins training Robby and Sam, but Amanda calls him out for caring more about teaching Karate than doing his job. Johnny continues to use harsh methods to train his students, including forcing them to move a full cement truck to train their leg strength, impressing Kreese. Daniel invites Robby to move in with him after seeing the state of his home, although Amanda reminds him Johnny is still around. Daniel confronts Johnny outside the Cobra Kai dojo, where Kreese mockingly offers his condolences on Mr. Miyagi's death and warns Daniel that their fight is "inevitable."
13	3	"Fire and Ice"	Michael Grossman	Teleplay by : Stacey Harman; Story by : Josh Heald & Jon Hurwitz & Hayden Schlossberg & Stacey Harman	April 24, 2019
Johnny uses a computer for the first time and sees a Miyagi-Do ad on YouTube where Daniel is promoting Miyagi-Do Karate for free, while attacking Cobra Kai. Two teenagers want to join Miyagi-Do, but when Daniel tells them to wax on and off the fence, they decide to join Cobra Kai instead. Meanwhile, Miguel learns that Robby is Johnny's son and confronts Johnny about it, who confides in him that on the day Robby was born back in 2002, he wasn't there for him because Johnny's mother (at the time, the only person he cared about) had passed away. Afraid of being a father, he failed Robby on his first day and vows never to fail Miguel. When Daniel, Sam, and Robby perform their Miyagi-Do demonstration at Valley Fest, Cobra Kai interrupts with their own demonstration, which outshines Miyagi-Do's, making them more popular.
14	4	"The Moment of Truth"	Michael Grossman	Teleplay by : Kevin McManus & Matthew McManus; Story by : Josh Heald & Jon Hurwitz & Hayden Schlossberg & Kevin McManus & Matthew McManus	April 24, 2019
Demetri, seeing that all his friends have taken up karate, goes to Cobra Kai, where he gets beaten by Kreese and ultimately joins Miyagi-Do instead. Later, in the Cobra Kai dojo, new student Tory Nichols proves to be Miguel's equal, eventually bonding with both Miguel and Aisha. Miguel tries to tell Johnny his worries about Kreese's influence, but Johnny reassures him that everyone deserves a second chance. Daniel tries to convince other people to join Miyagi-do but fails, while Sam develops a feud with Tory, who embarrasses her at a party. Robby tries to stage a fight with his former friends to convince people to join Miyagi-Do but is hit in the back of the head. Though Daniel arrives to save him, Robby had recorded the fight, but Daniel asks him not to upload it, explaining that students should join Miyagi-Do out of necessity.
15	5	"All In"	Josh Heald	Josh Heald & Jon Hurwitz & Hayden Schlossberg	April 24, 2019
Demetri reveals that he wants to learn karate so he can stand up to Eli, who has been starting to bully him. Hawk sees a Yelp review of Demetri giving Cobra Kai a negative rating and goes to confront him at the mall, but Sam and Robby arrive to defeat Hawk and the other Cobra Kais. Demetri eventually improves his karate skills, while Moon, Hawk's girlfriend, breaks up with him for his violent behavior. Later, Kreese suggests to a vengeful Hawk to vandalize Daniel's dojo. Meanwhile, Miguel starts a romantic relationship with Tory. Carmen convinces Johnny, still heartbroken over Robby and Daniel's fatherly relationship, to let go of his rivalry. The next day, a horrified Daniel discovers the destruction of Miyagi-Do, including Mr. Miyagi's Medal of Honor stolen and the vandalization of his '48 Ford Super De Luxe. He goes to Cobra Kai to confront Johnny, assuming he is involved. As a result, some students leave Cobra Kai to join Miyagi-Do.
16	6	"Take a Right"	Josh Heald	Josh Heald & Jon Hurwitz & Hayden Schlossberg	April 24, 2019
Johnny makes everyone do burpees until someone confesses before he gets a call from one of his old friends. Both Demetri and Robby hold grudges against Chris, a new student of Miyagi-do and former Cobra Kai who attacked Demetri at the mall. Daniel reveals that he once was part of Cobra Kai, recounting his negative history with Terry Silver while training for the 1985 All-Valley Tournament, (Note: As depicted in The Karate Kid Part III (1989)) stating that while Cobra Kai is bad, not all students are, convincing them to end their conflicts. Johnny travels to San Bernardino, where he meets up with his old Cobra Kai mates Bobby, Tommy, and Jimmy, to support Tommy, who has a terminal illness, revealing to them that he reopened Cobra Kai with Kreese, with Bobby encouraging him to move on from Cobra Kai. In Johnny's absence, Kreese takes over and trains Cobra Kai to be more ruthless; Miguel calls Kreese out for it, but Kreese claims that mercy is not beneficial in real life. Tory opens up to Miguel that her mother had to work as a waitress to support Tory and her brother, and her mom would take leftovers to feed them, but when her mom's boss found out, she got fired, which led to Tory's aggressive behavior. After a night of camping, Johnny and his friends awake to find that Tommy has died in his sleep.
17	7	"Lull"	Jennifer Celotta	Teleplay by : Kevin McManus & Matthew McManus; Story by : Josh Heald & Jon Hurwitz & Hayden Schlossberg & Kevin McManus & Matthew McManus	April 24, 2019
Kreese informs Daniel that he will be training Cobra Kai for the upcoming war against Miyagi-Do, despite Daniel's protest that they're just kids. Upon returning from his trip, Johnny takes his Cobra Kai students into the woods to participate in "Capture the Headband." During this, Johnny becomes distraught over Tory's aggressiveness, while Miguel spots Hawk wearing Miyagi's Medal of Honor. Realizing that he was the one who vandalized the Miyagi-Do dojo, Hawk taunts Miguel on his feelings for Sam, leading to a scuffle with Miguel emerging victorious. Miguel takes the Medal of Honor but is ambushed and has his headband taken off by a new adult Cobra Kai student, Stingray. Johnny personally warns Miguel not to take the dark path under Kreese's influence. Later, Miguel goes to return the Medal of Honor at the LaRusso house, where Robby and Sam have started a romance. He asks Robby to return the medal to Daniel and tell Sam he's sorry before leaving. Fearing that this will sabotage his newfound relationship with Sam, Robby keeps it a secret. After realizing that Kreese hasn't changed and is trying to corrupt students as he did in the past, Johnny expels him from Cobra Kai.
18	8	"Glory of Love"	Jennifer Celotta	Teleplay by : Joe Piarulli & Luan Thomas; Story by : Josh Heald & Jon Hurwitz & Hayden Schlossberg & Joe Piarulli & Luan Thomas	April 24, 2019
Johnny fantasizes about Carmen but is dismayed to meet Carmen's boyfriend. After expelling Kreese, he teaches his students to show mercy and honor. Meanwhile, Demetri finds the Medal of Honor, which Robby planted in the dojo backyard to prevent Sam from returning to Miguel, who sets up Johnny on a dating app. After failing miserably on his dates, Johnny sends a message to his ex, Ali Mills. At the skate mall, Miguel and Robby go on separate dates with Tory and Sam, where the tension between the two girls heats up, resulting in Sam and Robby getting kicked out of the roller rink due to Sam sweeping Tory in retaliation for Tory pushing her. Daniel apologizes to his wife, while Johnny beats up Carmen's boyfriend, who was planning to dump Carmen soon, and soon asks Carmen out on a date.
19	9	"Pulpo"	Jon Hurwitz & Hayden Schlossberg	Teleplay by : Michael Jonathan Smith; Story by : Josh Heald & Jon Hurwitz & Hayden Schlossberg & Michael Jonathan Smith	April 24, 2019
Robby's mom, Shannon, returns, apologizing to Robby about how she has been treating him, and reveals that her boyfriend left her and that she's going into rehab. Both Cobra Kai and Miyagi-Do kids go to a party hosted by Moon just before school starts, where the rivalry between Sam and Tory intensifies after Tory witnesses Sam drunkenly kiss Miguel after Sam finds out that Miguel returned the Medal of Honor to Robby. Outraged at Moon's new relationship with a girl named Piper, Hawk also intensifies his feud with Demetri, who humiliates Hawk in retaliation. The cops arrive just as the two dojos are about to fight, causing everyone to flee the party. Elsewhere, Johnny and Carmen go on a date at a restaurant before unexpectedly seeing Daniel and Amanda arrive. While Amanda and Carmen are away, Daniel and Johnny discuss getting rid of Kreese, and Johnny finds out that Daniel has enrolled Robby in high school, much to his appreciation. The two couples bond overnight, with Daniel and Johnny seemingly putting their rivalry aside. Afterward, Johnny gets a visit from Robby and an intoxicated Sam.
20	10	"No Mercy"	Jon Hurwitz & Hayden Schlossberg	Teleplay by : Joe Piarulli & Luan Thomas; Story by : Josh Heald & Jon Hurwitz & Hayden Schlossberg & Joe Piarulli & Luan Thomas	April 24, 2019
Johnny allows Robby and Sam to sleep at his place for the night after the party to hide from the LaRussos. When Daniel finds out, he goes to Johnny's apartment to get her, and he and Johnny get into a fight, causing a furious Daniel to cut ties with Johnny and Robby. On the first day of school, Stingray applies to be the local security guard, while Robby confesses to Sam about his trick with the Medal of Honor, but leaves for class before Sam can confess to him about her encounter with Miguel. Tory hijacks the PA system and calls out Sam for kissing Miguel at the party, shocking everyone, including Robby. She then starts a fight with Sam, dragging their respective dojos into an all-out school brawl, during which Demetri fends off a ballistic Hawk and Tory attempts to injure Sam with a jagged wristband. The latter ultimately defeats Tory, and Miguel gains the upper hand on Robby but shows him mercy. An enraged Robby kicks Miguel off a balcony, accidentally paralyzing and rendering him unconscious. Miguel is put on life support while Robby flees. As a result, Carmen breaks up with Johnny, and the remaining Cobra Kai students, who blame Johnny for teaching Miguel mercy and honor, join Kreese, who reveals that the landlord allowed him to take over and have full ownership of the dojo during Johnny's trip. Amanda also demands Daniel stop Miyagi-Do and karate, forcing him to dismantle the Miyagi-Do dojo. In the meantime, a guilt-ridden Johnny abandons his car and throws his phone away. Unbeknownst to Johnny, Ali sent him a friend request on Facebook.

== Production ==
=== Development ===
Six days after the first season's release, YouTube renewed the series for a second season in May 2018. Series creators Josh Heald, Jon Hurwitz, and Hayden Schlossberg continued to serve as showrunners, executive producers, writers, and directors for the season. Production began in late that year and the season consists of ten episodes. James Lassiter and Caleeb Pinkett also returned as executive producers alongside production companies Overbrook Entertainment and Sony Pictures Television Studios. Following the season's release YouTube renewed the series for a third season.

=== Casting ===
Ralph Macchio and William Zabka continued to appear as Daniel LaRusso and Johnny Lawrence, respectively. Xolo Maridueña, Tanner Buchanan, Mary Mouser, and Courtney Henggeler were also confirmed to return. Martin Kove, who had guest starred in the first-season finale, joined the season as a series regular, reprising the role John Kreese, from the first three films in the franchise. Jacob Bertrand and Gianni DeCenzo who recurred throughout the first season were also promoted to series regulars. Paul Walter Hauser and Peyton List were cast in recurring roles for the season. Additionally, other actors from the film franchise including Rob Garrison, Ron Thomas, Tony O'Dell, and Randee Haller made guest appearances during the season.

=== Filming ===
The season utilized soundstages at Pinewood Atlanta Studios where filming took place on October 17–19, 2018. Principal photography also took place earlier that month around Marietta, Georgia, on October 15. Additional filming later took place in Union City on November 8. Filming was also spotted at the closed Rio Bravo restaurant from November 28–29. Additional filming locations for the season included the Tybee Island pier, the North DeKalb Mall, Westview Cemetery, and Marietta City Hall. The Los Angeles, California neighborhoods Encino, Norwalk, Reseda, and Tarzana also served as filming locales. Filming concluded in December.

=== Music ===
Featured music from the season primarily highlighted music from the 1980s, including the bands AC/DC, Airbourne, and Bananarama, as well as present day bands such as Fifth Harmony.

==== Soundtrack ====
Cobra Kai: Season 2 (Music from the Original Series)
- Album cover.

Soundtrack album by Leo Birenberg & Zach Robinson
- Released: April 24, 2019
- Genre: Soundtrack
- Length: 78:08
- Label: Madison Gate Records

Leo Birenberg & Zach Robinson chronology
Cobra Kai (Score from the Original Series) (2018)	Cobra Kai: Season 2 (Music from the Original Series) (2019)	Cobra Kai: Season 3 (Soundtrack from the Netflix Original Series) (2021)

Madison Gate Records released a digital soundtrack album, on April 24, 2019, to accompany the season. La-La Land Records released a deluxe edition of the soundtrack via CD, featuring nine additional tracks, on January 19 the same year. Leo Birenberg and Zach Robinson continued to serve as composers for the second season.

===== Track listing =====
All music is composed by Leo Birenberg & Zach Robinson, except where noted.

No.	Title	Length
1.	"Miyagi-Do Fix-Up"	2:33
2.	"Snake Fight"	2:19
3.	"The Wheel Technique"	1:54
4.	"Like a Dance"	3:12
5.	"The Internet"	1:25
6.	"I Got Old"	2:53
7.	"An Old Friend" (Bill Conti)	1:25
8.	"Shochu-Geiko"	1:24
9.	"Tory with a Y"	1:58
10.	"Furious Hawk"	1:11
11.	"Medal of Honor"	1:24
12.	"Into the Snake Pit"	2:26
13.	"Military Exercise - Who's Gonna Break"	2:13
14.	"New Students"	0:59
15.	"Fatherly Advice"	1:48
16.	"Mall Fight" (Conti)	1:39
17.	"You're the Champ"	1:34
18.	"We are All Miyagi-Do" (Conti)	2:48
19.	"Busted"	0:49
20.	"Worthy Opponent"	2:12
21.	"Kan-Geiko"	1:04
22.	"Sam and Robby" (Conti)	1:24
23.	"Mercy and Honor"	2:23
24.	"Apartment Skirmish"	1:06
25.	"Black Paint on a White Wall"	1:40
26.	"I'm Coming for You, Bitch"	1:38
27.	"Hallway Hellscape"	3:37
28.	"Scale the School"	0:51
29.	"Hawk's Prey"	1:29
30.	"Rematch"	2:08
31.	"Fallen Soldier" (Conti)	2:39
32.	"Voicemail"	1:00
33.	"In It No Matter What"	1:39
34.	"It Belongs to Me"	3:20
35.	"Cruel Summer" (Composed by: Sara Dallin, Siobhan Fahey, Keren Woodward, Steve Jolley and Tony Swain, Performed by: Kari Kimmel)	2:26

La-La Land Records bonus tracks
No.	Title	Length
36.	"Hawk's Tattoo"	1:51
37.	"Comic Store"	1:15
38.	"Make a Move"	0:30
39.	"Cement Truck"	0:43
40.	"Awkward"	0:39
41.	"Lifting the Rock"	0:47
42.	"The Lull Between Battles"	1:32
43.	"Coyote Creek"	0:48
44.	"Rehab"	1:59
45.	"Miyagi-Do Commercial"	0:50
Total length:		78:08

== Marketing and release ==
YouTube Premium released a six-minute commercial parodying ESPN's 30 for 30 in April 2019, featuring the main cast members and select ESPN personalities analyzing the 1984 match between Daniel and Johnny. When the season's renewal was announced it was reported that the season would premiere on the subscription-based streaming video on demand platform YouTube Red. Prior to the season's release the streaming service name was changed to YouTube Premium. The season was released on April 24. A potential move of the series to Netflix was also explored prior to the season's release when YouTube chose to shift its focus on original content from scripted to unscripted. As part of this shift episodes of the season were made free to view beginning in September as YouTube also shifted to an advertisement supported service rather than subscription supported. This was the final season to release as an original series on YouTube with all subsequent seasons ultimately moving to Netflix. YouTube did however maintain the rights to continue streaming the first two seasons on a non-exclusive basis, alongside Netflix which released the first two seasons on August 28, 2020.

== Reception ==
=== Critical response ===
Professional ratings
Aggregate scores
Source	Rating
Metacritic	66/100
Rotten Tomatoes	90%
Review scores
Source	Rating
The A.V. Club	C
Den of Geek	4/5 stars
Entertainment Weekly	B+
IGN	8.7/10
IndieWire	B−
Rolling Stone	2.5/5 stars
The Telegraph	4/5 stars

On the review aggregator website Rotten Tomatoes the season holds a 90% approval rating with an average rating 7.4 out of 10, based on 31 reviews. The website critical consensus reads: "While Cobra Kai's subversive kick no longer carries the same gleeful impact of its inaugural season, its second round is still among the best around -- no amount of mid-life crisis and teenage ennui's ever gonna keep it down". On Metacritic, the season has a weighted average score of 66 out of 100, based on reviews from 7 critics indicating "generally favorable" reviews. Alex McLevy writing for The A.V. Club said that the season felt to be a "witty relaunch of a beloved film" and that with "half the humor and double the melodrama" of the first season McLevy compared it to that of a soap opera. Alan Sepinwall from Rolling Stone similarly wrote that the season is "leaning too hard on nostalgia and a soapy teen love triangle". Den of Geek' Andrew Husband disagreed saying that although the season had its issues, that it had "some of the most exciting creative storytelling" of recent television. Kristen Baldwin from Entertainment Weekly wrote that despite the series being based on a 1980s film, it doesn't live in the past, and that the season "hits viewers with bursts of nostalgia endorphins, leaving us giddy and defenseless against the next emotional wallop". IGN reviewer David Griffin stated that he was initially skeptical of Martin Kove's addition to the main cast but that his character later adds a dynamic to the season and raises its stakes. Hanh Nguyn of IndieWire said the season helps "capture the energy of 1980's cinema" and praised the addition of cast members such as Peyton List, who Nguyn said brings a "fresh and energetic immediacy to the conflicts". When reviewing the first two seasons together after its release on Netflix, The Telegraph's Ed Power wrote that the series "is aware, that times have changed and that in the grown-up world there are problems that can't be solved by a punch to the solar plexus or a sneaky scissor kick".

=== Awards and nominations ===
At the 71st Primetime Creative Arts Emmy Awards the season was nominated for an Emmy award in the Outstanding Stunt Coordination for a Comedy Series or Variety Program category, but the award went to GLOW, a television series on Netflix. A 2019 Teen Choice Awards nomination was also picked up for Choice Summer TV Series, which was ultimately awarded to the third season of Stranger Things, which also airs on Netflix. The extended promotional trailer, "Cobra Kai 30 for 30", was nominated for a Clio Award, an award program that specifically issues awards for advertising; This award was lost to Netflix's When They See Us for an advertisement named "Room to Room".

=== Viewing figures ===
Within three days of the season's release it was reported that it was 136% more in demand than the first season was in the same three-day period. The season was the most in demand original streaming series during the first seven days of its release, beating the second place holder, Hulu's The Act, by 41%. It was also reported that the season generated more demand than the second season releases of The Handmaid's Tale, The Marvelous Mrs. Maisel, and Atlanta in their seven-day window. "Mercy Part II", the season's premiere episode, had been seen by 20 million viewers within six days, the fastest period for a YouTube original to do so at the time. A week later the season remained the most in demand original streaming series, raising 20% from the week prior (Parrot Analytics). Prior to the season's release on Netflix data showed that it was already the most demanded series on the service, beating both The Frozen Ground and Lucifer which had already been released. Once the first and second season were released on Netflix together the series gained 2.17 billion streaming minutes after seven days across its then 20-episodes. The following month the series topped Netflix's most-viewed series list for the entire 30-day period. Netflix reported that 50 million accounts viewed at least two minutes of an episode during that time period.
