= Robot Stories =

- Promotional poster
- Directed by: Greg Pak
- Written by: Greg Pak
- Produced by: Karin Chien; Kim Ima
- Starring: Tamlyn Tomita; James Saito; Wai Ching Ho; Greg Pak; Sab Shimono
- Cinematography: Peter Olsen
- Edited by: Stephanie Sterner
- Music by: Rick Knutsen
- Distributed by: Pak Film
- Release date: January 20, 2003 (Slamdance)
- Running time: 85 minutes
- Country: United States
- Language: English
- Box office: $131,451

Robot Stories is a 2003 American independent anthology science fiction comedy-drama film written and directed by Greg Pak. The film consists of four stories in which human characters struggle to connect in a world of robot babies and android office workers.

== Plot ==
The film is divided up to four short stories:

=== My Robot Baby ===
A young Marcia hides in the closet from her parents' fighting due to a mistake she has made. Marcia apologizes when her mother finds her in the closet; her mother tells Marcia to never fall in love, get married, and have children. Twenty-five years later, Marcia is married to Ray and they are looking towards adopting a child. After going to an adoption clinic, they apply for an adoption trial where they take care of a robotic baby before they can adopt a human child. Marcia begins to struggle when she is alone to take care of the robot baby, as she becomes flustered with what to do when the baby cries. Marcia brings the robot baby to her father, a handyman, and sees if he can tamper with the electronics of the robot. However, Marcia's father worries that the doctors of the adoption clinic will detect the alteration of the robot. Nonetheless, Marcia persists on getting the baby reprogrammed and leaves the baby to her father while Marcia goes to work. As Marcia comes home to the robot baby now automated, she attempts to talk to the baby. However, the robot baby goes berserk and attacks Marcia. Marcia finds the robot baby in the closet, then remembers her young self hiding in the closet as her own mother was angry. Marcia then cries and is able to hug her robot baby, finding closure to her past.

=== The Robot Fixer ===
Bernice witnesses her son, Wilson, in a severe accident that left him in a coma. Upset, she heads to Wilson's apartment and cleans up the place with her daughter, Grace. Bernice finds Wilson's old toy robot collection and attempts to find the missing parts through yard sales and hobby shops. Throughout the search, Bernice remembers flashbacks of how little she really knows of Wilson, as the young Wilson would play with his robot toys and not hear Bernice's callings. As Bernice learns that Wilson will inevitably die, Bernice scrambles to find the last robot, specifically, a missing wing from the only "girl" robot her son's collection. (In a flashback, Bernice remembers carelessly vacuuming up the now missing wing). She finds the complete female robot shop at a local hobby shop, only to find it is not for sale, as it is very rare. In an act of desperation, she steals the wing, attaches it to Wilson's toy, and pretends to fly it through the air, perhaps as a way to accept that her son is now truly gone, and is making his way toward heaven. To apologize for the theft, she sends all of Wilson's toys to the shop/collector, but keeps the angel like female robot as a way to stay connected to her son, even though she now finally accepts his death.

=== Machine Love ===
An office worker android, Archie, arrives at a workplace to do computer work. As he attempts to make acquaintance with people in the office workplace, he is rejected and shunned because he is a robot. Bob, the technician in charge of Archie, forgets to turn off Archie one night, letting him wander about the empty office complex after he finishes his work. He spots another office worker android across the street and stares at her all night. This becomes a reoccurring event for Archie, as Bob keeps forgetting to turn off Archie. As morning arrives, the workers are angry that Archie is not doing his work as he is low on power. Bob is then forced to turn Archie off, but Archie signals to Bob that he wants to meet the other office worker android across the street. As the two robots meet, they talk to each other and interact in a sexual manner.

=== Clay ===
John, an old sculptor, is told that he has only one year left to live. The doctors have recommended him to merge his consciousness into the digital world so he can live forever. He goes home and talks about his life expectancy to his wife (who has died in the past and is now a virtual hologram). The following day, John's son asks him to merge his consciousness in order for John to assist him, but John refuses as he wants to keep using his physical senses to make sculptures. John visits his wife in virtual space to ask her where she is, to which she responds multiple locations. John, unable to accept life after death through virtual reality, dies.

== Cast ==
- Tamlyn Tomita as Marcia
- Gina Quintos as young Marcia
- James Saito as Ray / Groper
- Wai Ching Ho as Bernice
- Greg Pak as Archie
- Julienne Hanzelka Kim as Lydia
- Sab Shimono as John
- Eisa Davis as Helen
- Ron Domingo as Tommy
- Cindy Cheung as Grace
- Louis Ozawa Changchien as Wilson
- Angel Desai as Amanda
- Bill Coelius as Bob
- Vin Knight as Doug
- Karen Tsen Lee as Mrs. Ito
- Glenn Kubota as Mr. Ito
- John Cariani as Salesman

== Production ==
Principal photography began on September 10, 2001, one day prior to the 9/11 attacks.

== Themes ==
=== Authenticity as Ideology ===
The characters in Robot Stories all have ideological developments, which they accept in some form. In Robot Baby, Marsha forgives herself from the past by accepting the robot baby as a child that she can care for. Her revelation that she is becoming what she feared from her past was the climax of her change, leading to her discovery of her true identity. In The Robot Fixer, Bernice notes how she never had a strong connection with her son due to their contrasting ideologies. It led her to rediscover who her son really is and to bring the relationship closer as her son nears death. Machine Love provides Archie a way to connect with others when others would not connect with him due to his “race” as a robot. By finding another robot working at a different corporation, Archie would finally be able to communicate without rejection. Clay allows John to decide the meaning of life in a world where consciousness can be permanently stored. As a sculptor, John is unable to cope with the fact that life without a physical body was not authentic life as the emotions of his wife have slowly become artificial to him while physical activities can no longer be a challenge. Hence, he finds that eternal consciousness is not worth living for.

== Reception ==
The film received largely positive reviews and has a score of 74% on Rotten Tomatoes, based on 43 reviews with an average rating of 6.6 out of 10, the consensus being that "Although its 4 stories vary in quality, Robot Stories is still worth a look for Twilight Zone fans".

Wesley Morris from The Boston Globe in his review said "In Robot Stories, technology hasn't colonized human life, it's finding ways to make living (and loving) better".

The San Francisco Chronicle in their glowing review said that "This is a science fiction film, but like all excellent movies in the genre, the focus never strays from the human heart."

The TV Guide review awarded it with three and a half out of four, and wrote that the film is "ostensibly about artificial life forms, each of these four short, expertly crafted stories offers a poignant perspective on what it means to be human".

The Christian Science Monitor's review of Robot Stories said that it was "Four stories with automatons as important characters...The last is the most touching, but all are skillfully made."

Robot Stories received much praise for the direction by Greg Pak. Variety magazine said "Pak understands the short form well, mercifully avoiding blatant O'Henry twists while pulling off neat reversals of expertly set-up genre expectations", and Elvis Mitchell of The New York Times wrote of Pak's directing saying that "The most startling aspect of Robot Stories is not the mix that the director built from spare parts left on the curb but the evolving dramatic acumen of its maker; he's a talent with a future."
