= Tamlyn Tomita =

Japanese-American actress (born 1966)

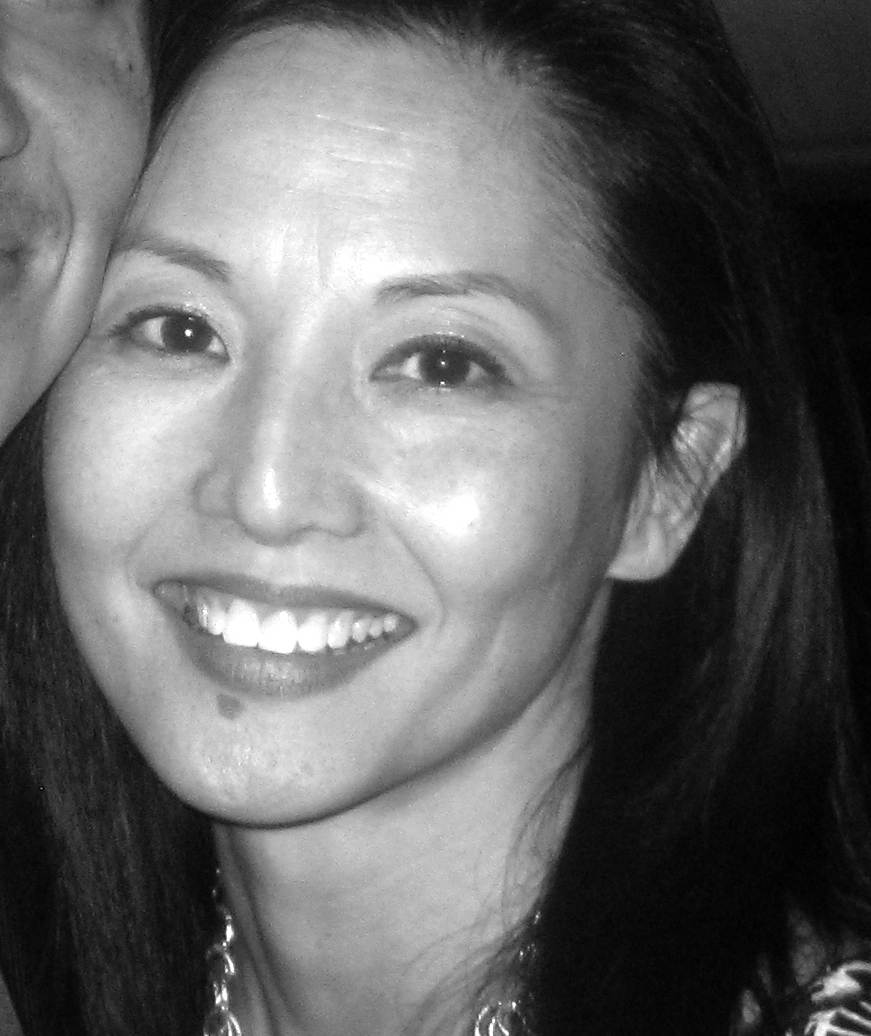
- Tomita in 2010
- Born: Tamlyn Naomi Tomita; January 27, 1966 (age 60); Okinawa City, Ryukyu Islands (now Japan)
- Education: University of California, Los Angeles
- Occupation: Actress
- Years active: 1986–present
- Spouse(s): Daniel Blinkoff (m. 2021)

Tamlyn Naomi Tomita (born January 27, 1966) is a Japanese-American actress. She made her screen debut as Kumiko in The Karate Kid Part II (1986) and reprised the character for the streaming series Cobra Kai (2021). She is also well known for her role as Waverly in The Joy Luck Club (1993). Additional films include Come See the Paradise (1990), Picture Bride (1994), Four Rooms (1995), Robot Stories (2003), The Day After Tomorrow (2004) and Gaijin 2: Love Me as I Am (2005).

Tomita also has played several recurring roles on television series, including 24, Glee, Teen Wolf, Eureka, and How to Get Away with Murder. She starred on the Epix drama series Berlin Station (2016), and in 2017 began starring in the ABC medical drama The Good Doctor. In 2020, she had a recurring role in Star Trek: Picard. She also released a solo album "Sweet Surprise" exclusively in Japan.

== Early life and education ==
Tamlyn Tomita, a second generation Japanese-American (nisei), was born January 27, 1966, on a U.S. military base in Okinawa and grew up in Los Angeles. Her Japanese-American father was in an internment camp during World War II. He met her mother while stationed in Okinawa between the Korean and Vietnam Wars. Her mother was of half-Native Okinawan and half-Filipino descent, born in Manila and emigrated to Okinawa after World War II. Her father became an LAPD officer upon returning to Los Angeles.

Tomita graduated from Granada Hills High School and attended University of California, Los Angeles (UCLA), where she studied history and planned to become a history teacher. While a junior at UCLA, she participated in Nisei Week, where she was crowned its 1984 queen. She and several other Japanese-American girls were asked by Helen Funai, the 1963 pageant queen, to audition for the role of Kumiko in The Karate Kid II. She promised her parents that she would finish college, and then explore acting.

== Career ==
=== Film ===
After The Karate Kid Part II (1986), Tomita had major roles in a number of independent movies. Her biggest role was in the 1990 drama film Come See the Paradise. In 1993, she co-starred opposite Ming-Na Wen in the ensemble cast drama The Joy Luck Club and the next year she had a role in the 1994 independent film Picture Bride. In 1995 Tomita appeared alongside Antonio Banderas in the Robert Rodriguez-directed segment of the vignette anthology comedy Four Rooms.

In the 21st century, Tomita has had roles in other independent films and co-starred in several major Hollywood productions, including playing Janet Tokada in The Day After Tomorrow. In 2005, she starred in the Brazilian drama film Gaijin 2: Love Me as I Am and also had a leading role in the independent film Robot Stories in 2003. She was also in Only the Brave about the Japanese American segregated fighting unit, the 442nd Regimental Combat Team of World War II, which included two other Karate Kid stars, Yuji Okumoto and Pat Morita.

=== Television ===
Tomita appeared as a character named Ming Li on the NBC daytime soap opera Santa Barbara from May to September 1988. In 1994, she guest-starred in the first episode of season 3 of Highlander: The Series. In 2008, she made her return to daytime soaps with a recurring role on ABC's General Hospital. In 2012, she had another recurring role on NBC's Days of Our Lives.

From 1996 to 1997, Tomita was a regular cast member in the short-lived UPN drama series, The Burning Zone. In 1993, she appeared in the pilot movie for Babylon 5 as Lt. Commander Takashima, second-in-command of the titular space station, but she declined the opportunity to continue as a cast member of the subsequent series. During her career she has guest starred on shows such as Seven Days; Quantum Leap; Living Single; Murder, She Wrote; Chicago Hope; Will & Grace; Nash Bridges; The Shield; Strong Medicine; Stargate SG-1; Stargate: Atlantis; The Mentalist; Private Practice; True Blood; Zoo; Tour of Duty; Criminal Minds; and many other dramas and comedies. She had longer term recurring roles on Crossing Jordan, JAG, 24, Eureka, Heroes, Law & Order: Los Angeles, Glee, Teen Wolf, Resurrection, How to Get Away with Murder, and Chasing Life.

In 2016, Tomita played a series regular role on the Epix drama series Berlin Station. From 2017 to 2019 she was a recurring character on the ABC medical drama The Good Doctor.

Tomita began a recurring role as the Vulcan/Romulan hybrid Commodore Oh on the CBS All Access web television series Star Trek: Picard in 2020.

In 2021, she reprised her 1980s role as Kumiko for two episodes in Season 3 of Cobra Kai, a television sequel to the Karate Kid films.

== Personal life ==
Tomita has been married twice. After her first marriage ended in divorce, she started a long-term relationship with actor Daniel Blinkoff, and they had been together for 13 years as of 2017; as of August 2021, they were married and had founded the Outside In Theatre in the Highland Park neighborhood of Los Angeles.

== Filmography ==
=== Film ===
List of film performances by Tamlyn Tomita
Year	Title	Role	Notes
1986	The Karate Kid Part II	Kumiko	Debut role
1987	Hawaiian Dream	Karren Saito	
1990	Vietnam, Texas	Lan	
1990	Come See the Paradise	Lily Yuriko Kawamura / McGann	
1993	The Joy Luck Club	Waverly Jong	
1994	Picture Bride	Kana	
1994	Notes on a Scale		
1995	Four Rooms	Wife	Segment: "The Misbehavers"
1995	Requiem	Fong	Short film
1997	The Killing Jar	Diane Sanford	
1997	Touch	Prosecutor	
1998	Hundred Percent	Thaise	
1998	Soundman	Butch's Wife	
1998	Living Out Loud	Mrs. Nelson	
1999	Life Tastes Good	Julie Sado	
2000	Betty Anderson	Detective Miyamoto	Short film
2003	Robot Stories	Marcia	
2003	Day of Independence	Choir Member	Short film
2004	The Perfect Party	Mom	
2004	The Day After Tomorrow	Janet Tokada	
2005	Gaijin 2: Love Me as I Am	Maria Yamashita Salinas	
2005	True Love & Minosa Tea	Rebecca Nakasone	Short film
2006	Only the Brave	Mary Takata	
2006	Peace	Sandy Sakai	Short film
2007	Pandemic	Melissa Lo	Short film
2008	The Eye	Mrs. Cheung	
2008	Finding Madison	Beth	
2009	Why Am I Doing This?	Donna	
2009	Tekken	Jun Kazama	
2010	The Mikado Project	Viola	
2010	Nómadas		
2010	Starlight Inn	Grace Kim	Short film
2011	The Charles Kim Show	Herself	Short film
2012	White Room: 02B3	Five	Short film
2014	Awesome Asian Bad Guys	Tamlyn / Pamlyn (2013)	
2014	Teacher of the Year	Vivian Lew	
2014	Operation Marriage	Lee	Short film
2015	Daddy	Sharlene Hong	
2016	The Good Neighbor	Heather Cromwell	
2016	The Unbidden	Lauren Lee	
2016	Seppuku	Linda	Short film
2017	Real Artists	Anne Palladon	Short film
2019	The Living Worst	Chita Montague	
2020	I Will Make You Mine	Julia	
2024	Ultraman: Rising	Mina / Emiko Sato	Voice

=== Television ===
List of television performances or appearances by Tamlyn Tomita
Year	Title	Role	Notes
1987	Tour of Duty	VC Peasant Woman	Episode: "Sitting Ducks"
1987–1988	Santa Barbara	Lily Murakami, Ming Li	31 episodes
1988	Hiroshima Maiden	Miyeko Matsuda	Television film
1988	To Heal a Nation	Maya Ying Lin	Television film
1989	The Karate Kid	Additional Characters (voices)	Episode: "My Brother's Keeper"
1990	Hiroshima: Out of the Ashes	Sally	Television film
1992	Quantum Leap	Tamlyn Matsuda	Episode: "Temptation Eyes"
1992	Raven	Kim Tanaka	Episode: "Return of the Black Dragon"
1993	Babylon 5: The Gathering	Lt. Cmdr. Laurel Takashima	Television film
1994	Time Trax	Toshi	Episode: "Return of the Yakuza"
1994	Vanishing Son II	Lanchi	Television film
1994	One West Waikiki	Taylor Chun	Episode: "'Til Death Do Us Part"
1994	Highlander: The Series	Midori Kent/Maia Koto	Episode: "The Samurai"
1994	Living Single	Mary	Episode: "Bristle While You Work"
1994	Vanishing Son IV	Lanchi	Television film
1994	Murder, She Wrote	Det. Sharon Matsumoto	Episode: "Death in Hawaii"
1994	Roseanne	Waitress	Episode: "Isn't It Romantic?"
1995	Vanishing Son	Lan Chi	Episode: "Single Flame"
1995	Sisters	Kiri Adams	2 episodes
1996	Chicago Hope	Tina – Sutton's Ex #3	Episode: "Ex Marks the Spot"
1996–1997	The Burning Zone	Dr. Kimberly Shiroma	Series regular, 11 episodes
1997	The Sentinel	Suzane Tomaki	Episode: "Smart Alec"
1997	Raven: Return of the Black Dragons	Kim Tanaka	Television film
1998	Chicago Hope	Jennifer Watanabe	Episode: "McNeil and Pray"
1999	Seven Days	Michelle	Episode: "Walter"
1999	Will & Grace	Naomi	Episode: "I Never Promised You an Olive Garden"
1999	The Last Man on Planet Earth	Agent Kara Hastings	Television film
2000	Runaway Virus	Monique Chao	Television film
2000	Nash Bridges	Amy Chin	2 episodes
2000	The Michael Richards Show	Ming	Episode: "USA Toy"
2001	Destiny		Television film
2001	FreakyLinks	Emma Reed	Episode: "Subject: The Final Word"
2001	Walking Shadow	Rikki Wu	Television film
2001	Providence	Mary Cassidy	Episode: "Civil Unrest"
2001	Crossing Jordan	Dr. Grace Yakura	3 episodes
2002	The Shield	Wanda Higoshi	Episode: "Pilot"
2002	For the People	Dr. Chaney	Episode: "Come Blow Your Whistle"
2002–2003	JAG	Lt. Cmdr. Tracy Manetti	Recurring role, 7 episodes
2002–2003	24	Jenny Dodge	Recurring role, 5 episodes
2003	The Agency	Elizabeth—Female Kidnapper	2 episodes
2003	Threat Matrix	Special Agent Nicole Hill	Episode: "Under the Gun"
2004	Strong Medicine	Dr. Nash	Episode: "Goodbye/Rest in Peace"
2004–2005	North Shore	Xiao	2 episodes
2005	Jane Doe: Now You See It, Now You Don't	Helen Morrison	Television film
2006	Commander in Chief	Randy	Episode: "No Nukes Is Good Nukes"
2006	Stargate SG-1	Shen Xiaoyi	2 episodes
2006, 2008	Stargate Atlantis	Shen Xiaoyi	2 episodes
2006–2007, 2009	Eureka	Kim Anderson	Recurring role, 5 episodes
2007	Women's Murder Club	Sachiko Johannes	Episode: "Maybe Baby"
2007–2008, 2010	Heroes	Ishi Nakamura	3 episodes
2008–2009	General Hospital	Giselle	6 episodes
2008	Saving Grace	Tori Chen	Episode: "Have a Seat, Earl"
2008	Twenty Good Years		Episode: "Come Fly with Me"
2008	Two Sisters	Shakti	Television film
2009	Monk	Eileen Hill	Episode: "Mr. Monk Fights City Hall"
2009	The Mentalist	Lauri Medina	Episode: "Bloodshot"
2009	Criminal Minds	Dr. Linda Kimura	Episode: "Amplification"
2009	CSI: Miami	Dr. Sarah Fordham	Episode: "Seeing Red"
2009	Private Practice	Katie's Lawyer	Episode: "Strange Bedfellows"
2010	Memphis Beat	Noreen Drake	Episode: "I Want to Be Free"
2010–2011	Law & Order: LA	Miwako Nishizawa	Recurring role, 10 episodes
2011	The Chicago Code	Prosecutor	Episode: "Bathhouse & Hinky Dink"
2011	The Protector	Katrina	Episode: "Bangs"
2011	Glee	Julia Chang	Episode: "Asian F"
2012	Days of Our Lives	Dr. Ellen Yu	6 episodes
2012	Make It or Break It	Dr. Lim	Episode: "Listen to the Universe"
2012	Touch	Kazuko Osugi	Episode: "Gyre, Part 1"
2012	Hollywood Heights	Sarah Medeiros	2 episodes
2013	Bones	Dr. Alice Crawford	Episode: "The Doll in the Derby"
2013	True Blood	Ms. Suzuki	2 episodes
2014–2017	Teen Wolf	Noshiko Yukimura	Recurring role, 16 episodes
2014	Resurrection	Dr. Toni Willis	Recurring role, 5 episodes
2014–2015	How to Get Away with Murder	Judge Carol Marrow	2 episodes
2014	NCIS: Los Angeles	Homeland Security Agent Shana Rollins	Episode: "Leipei"
2015	Chasing Life	Dr. Mae Lin	Recurring role, 5 episodes
2015	Zoo	Minako Oz	Episode: "The Silence of the Cicadas"
2016	Berlin Station	Sandra Abe	Series regular, 10 episodes
2017–2019	The Good Doctor	Allegra Aoki	Series regular (seasons 1–2); Special guest (season 3); 23 episodes
2018	Counterpart	Doctor	Episode: "Love the Lie"
2018	The Man in the High Castle	Tamiko Watanabe	Recurring role, 6 episodes
2020	Star Trek: Picard	Commodore Oh	3 episodes
2020	DuckTales	Inspector Tezuka	Episode: "Astro B.O.Y.D."
2021	Cobra Kai	Kumiko	2 episodes
2023–2026	Monarch: Legacy of Monsters	Caroline Randa	Guest role, 5 episodes
2024	Avatar: The Last Airbender	Yukari	Episode: "Warriors"
2024	Dead Boy Detectives	The Principal	Episode: "The Case of the Hungry Snake"
2026	Chicago Med	Celeste Frost	Guest role, 3 episodes
2026	Star Wars: Maul – Shadow Lord	Drea Lawson	Voice role, Episode: "Chapter 5: Inquisition"

=== Video Games ===
List of video game performances/appearances by Tamlyn Tomita
Year	Title	Role	Notes
2002	James Bond 007: Nightfire	Makiko Hayashi	

=== Web Series ===
List of web series performances/appearances by Tamlyn Tomita
Year	Title	Role	Notes
2026	Ace Combat 8: Wings of Theve - Hour Zero	Madison Haskell	Episode 3
