= The Karate Kid Part II =

1986 American film

- Theatrical release poster
- Directed by: John G. Avildsen
- Screenplay by: Robert Mark Kamen
- Based on: Characters created by Robert Mark Kamen
- Produced by: Jerry Weintraub
- Starring: Ralph Macchio; Noriyuki "Pat" Morita
- Cinematography: James Crabe
- Edited by: John G. Avildsen; David Garfield; Jane Kurson
- Music by: Bill Conti
- Production company: Delphi V Productions
- Distributed by: Columbia Pictures
- Release date: June 20, 1986
- Running time: 113 minutes
- Country: United States
- Language: English
- Budget: $12.5 million
- Box office: $130 million

The Karate Kid Part II is a 1986 American martial arts drama film written by Robert Mark Kamen and directed by John G. Avildsen. It is the second installment in The Karate Kid franchise and the sequel to the 1984 film The Karate Kid, starring Ralph Macchio and Pat Morita. The Karate Kid Part II follows Daniel LaRusso (Macchio), who accompanies his karate teacher Mr. Miyagi (Morita) to see his dying father in Okinawa, only to encounter an old friend-turned-rival with a long-harbored grudge against Miyagi.

Following the success of the first installment, preparation for a sequel began immediately. Upon completion of the final script, Macchio and Morita were re-signed and additional casting took place between May and July 1985. Principal photography began in September in Los Angeles, and filming completed in December. Locations included Oahu, which was used to represent Okinawa in the film.

The Karate Kid Part II was theatrically released in the United States by Columbia Pictures on June 20, 1986. The film received mixed reviews, with critics praising Morita's performance as well as the new location and characters, while others criticized elements of the storyline, the antagonists, and some of the action scenes. The film was a commercial success, grossing $130 million worldwide (the same amount as the first film), making it one of the highest-grossing films of 1986. A sequel titled The Karate Kid Part III was released in 1989.

== Plot ==
Shortly after his dojo's loss to Daniel LaRusso in the 1984 All-Valley Karate Tournament, (Note: As depicted in The Karate Kid (1984)) a furious John Kreese attacks his student, Johnny Lawrence, in the parking lot over the loss after he stood up to him while the other pupils defend Lawrence. Miyagi intervenes and passively incapacitates Kreese, then threatens to strike a deadly blow but instead tweaks his nose. Seeing Kreese's humiliation, Johnny and the other students abandon him and Cobra Kai.

Six months later, Daniel visits Miyagi after his senior prom and explains that Ali has broken up with him in favor of a UCLA football player. Miyagi receives a letter notifying him that his father is dying, prompting him to return to his home village on Okinawa Island.

Miyagi tells Daniel that he fell in love many years ago with a woman named Yukie. She was arranged to marry his best friend Sato, son of the wealthiest man in the village and fellow karate student of his father. Upon announcing his intentions to marry Yukie, Sato challenged him to a fight to the death. Instead, Miyagi left the country. Daniel decides to accompany him back to Okinawa.

Upon arrival, Miyagi and Daniel are greeted by Chozen Toguchi, who drives them to one of Sato's warehouses and reveals that he is Sato's nephew. Sato appears and demands that Miyagi fight him, which Miyagi adamantly refuses.

Arriving at the village, Miyagi and Daniel are welcomed by Yukie and her niece Kumiko. They discover that Sato has become a rich industrialist whose supertrawlers have destroyed the local fish population, impoverishing the other villagers. They are forced to rent property from Sato, who owns the village's land title. Yukie reveals that she never married Sato because of her love for Miyagi.

Miyagi's father dies, and Sato gives him three days to mourn out of respect before their fight. Miyagi shows Daniel the secret to his family's karate – a den-den daiko (handheld drum) that twists back and forth, illustrating the "drum technique", a counter-striking karate move that Daniel begins to practice. Daniel and Kumiko begin to develop a romance.

Daniel unintentionally exposes corruption in Chozen's grocery business during an encounter in the village. Chozen accuses him of insulting his honor, and they have a series of confrontations. The feud escalates when Chozen and his cronies attack Daniel and vandalize Miyagi's family property, but Miyagi fends them off.

Miyagi and Daniel plan to return home before the situation worsens, but Sato threatens to destroy the village if Miyagi refuses to fight him. He finally agrees on the condition that Sato relinquishes land ownership to the villagers, and Sato agrees.

A typhoon strikes the village on the day of the fight, forcing everyone to seek shelter. Sato's house collapses, leaving him trapped in the wreckage. Miyagi and Daniel rush to rescue him, and Daniel later ventures back out to save a child trapped on a nearby bell tower. Sato orders Chozen to help, but when he refuses, Sato rushes to assist Daniel himself. He publicly shames his nephew and disowns him, and an enraged Chozen runs off into the storm in disgrace.

Sato returns the next day with a work crew to help rebuild the village, asking Miyagi's forgiveness and handing over the deed. He also agrees to host the O-bon festival in a nearby ceremonial castle, inviting Daniel to join. During the celebration, a vengeful Chozen ziplines into the presentation and takes Kumiko hostage, demanding that he and Daniel fight to the death. Daniel fights bravely but is eventually overwhelmed by Chozen.

Miyagi, Sato, and the crowd respond by twisting den-den daikos in unison, inspiring Daniel to use the drum technique to defeat Chozen. He then grabs the vanquished Chozen and threatens to end his life, while Chozen urges Daniel to kill him. However, mirroring how Miyagi bravely stood up to Kreese and defeated him after the tournament, Daniel instead playfully tweaks Chozen's nose and drops him to the ground. The onlookers cheer as he and Kumiko embrace.

== Cast ==
- Ralph Macchio as Daniel LaRusso
- Pat Morita as Mr. Miyagi
- Nobu McCarthy as Yukie
- Tamlyn Tomita as Kumiko
- Danny Kamekona as Sato
- Yuji Okumoto as Chozen Toguchi
- Charlie Tanimoto as Miyagi Chōjun
- Joey Miyashima as Toshio
- Marc Hayashi as Taro

Opening sequence

- Martin Kove as John Kreese
- William Zabka as Johnny Lawrence
- Tony O'Dell as Jimmy
- Ron Thomas as Bobby
- Rob Garrison as Tommy
- Chad McQueen as Dutch
- Pat E. Johnson as Referee
- Bruce Malmuth as Announcer

Other notable cast appearances include BD Wong (credited as "Bradd Wong") as an Okinawan boy who invites Daniel and Kumiko to a dance club and Clarence Gilyard as one of the participants in the ice-breaking scene. Also, Traci Toguchi, who is credited as "Girl Bell Ringer", is the child rescued by Daniel in the typhoon, and is later identified as "Yuna" in the Cobra Kai season three episode "Miyagi-Do".

== Production ==
The opening scene takes place immediately following the finale of the first film to seamlessly tie the two together. It was originally planned as the ending for the first film, although it was not shot until after the second film's production began.

=== Filming ===
Principal photography took place in Oahu, Hawaii, in the northeastern area of the island known as the "windward side". The local countryside in modern-day Okinawa had been drastically changed due to the presence of military bases, so other locations in both Japan and Hawaii were scouted as alternative filming locations. Filmmakers selected a property in Oahu that was privately owned by a retired local physician who agreed to allow a portion of the land to be used in the film. To form the Okinawan village portrayed in the film, seven authentic replicas of Okinawan houses were constructed along with more than three acres of planted crops. Fifty Okinawa-born Hawaii residents were also recruited as film extras. Filming began on September 23, 1985, and ended on December 20.

== Music ==
The musical score for The Karate Kid Part II was composed and conducted by Bill Conti, who wrote the score for the previous installment, and is the only one of the trilogy not to feature the pan flute of Gheorghe Zamfir (a decision the composer regretted, according to the anniversary album liner notes), and performed by the Hollywood Studio Symphony. The film's signature tune was Peter Cetera's song "Glory of Love", which was a No. 1 hit in the United States and received an Academy Award nomination for Best Song. When Daniel and Miyagi are being driven by Chozen and his crony Toshio after they arrive in Okinawa, Chozen tunes in the radio of the car until he reaches a station playing "Fascination", the same song to which Ali and Johnny were slow dancing at the high-end country club in the original film and would later be heard in The Next Karate Kid during Miyagi and Julie's dance. The soundtrack was the final album released by United Artists Records.

1. "Glory of Love" (Peter Cetera)
2. "Rock 'n' Roll Over You" (The Moody Blues)
3. "Fish for Life" (Mancrab)
4. "Rock Around the Clock" (Paul Rodgers)
5. "Let Me at 'Em" (Southside Johnny)
6. "This Is the Time" (Dennis DeYoung)
7. "Earth Angel" (New Edition)
8. "Love Theme from The Karate Kid Part II" (Bill Conti)
9. "Two Looking at One" (Carly Simon)
10. "The Storm" (Bill Conti)

=== Charts ===
Chart (1986)	Peak position
Australia (Kent Music Report)	96
Canada Top Albums/CDs (RPM)	86
US Billboard 200	30

== Reception ==
=== Box office ===
The Karate Kid Part II opened in 1,323 theaters across North America on June 20, 1986. In its opening weekend, the film ranked first in its domestic box office grossing $12,652,336 with an average of $9,563 per theater. The film earned $20,014,510 in its opening week and ended its run earning a total of $115,103,979 domestically.

In the United Kingdom, the film grossed £2,313,517 ($3,391,272) at the box office. The film grossed a total of $130 million worldwide, matching the box office total of the original film.

In terms of box office admissions, the film sold 31,025,300 tickets in the United States. It also sold 2,625,169 tickets in France and Germany, and 2,518,483 tickets in Spain and Sweden, adding up to at least 36,168,952 tickets sold in the United States and Mainland Europe.

=== Critical response ===
The film had a mixed response from critics. At the review aggregator website Rotten Tomatoes, it holds a 48% approval rating, with an average score of 5.2 out of 10 based on 73 reviews. The website's critical consensus reads: "Like countless sequels, The Karate Kid Part II tries upping the stakes without straying too far from formula -- and suffers diminishing returns as a result". Metacritic, which uses a weighted average, assigned the season a score of 55 out of 100 based on 9 critics, indicating "mixed or average reviews". Audiences responded more positively; CinemaScore reported that filmgoers gave the film an average grade of "A-" on an A+ to F scale.

Movie-gazette.com gave the film a positive review, stating the film was a "worthy follow-up to the first Karate Kid film, with added interest provided by its exotic locations and characters". The Los Angeles Times also gave the film a positive review, particularly praising Pat Morita's performance as Miyagi and calling the actor "the heart of the movie". Film historian Leonard Maltin agreed with the strength of the performances, but called the film "purposeless... corny in the extreme — all that's missing from the climax is hounds and ice floes — but made palatable by winning performances. Best for kids". At the Movies gave the film a mixed review, with both critics praising the character Miyagi and the new locale, but feeling the character work gave way to predictable action scenes with dull villains. Roger Ebert recommended the movie overall while Gene Siskel did not.

=== Accolades ===
At the 1987 ASCAP Awards, Bill Conti won Top Box Office Films for the original music, which was released on United Artists Records. It also received an Academy Award nomination for Best Original Song for "Glory of Love".

== Merchandise ==
As with the first film, a novelization for the sequel was written by B.B. Hiller. A movie storybook written by Christopher Brown was also released.

=== Video games ===
A video game adaptation titled The Karate Kid Part II: The Computer Game was released in 1987 by publisher Microdeal on Atari ST and Amiga. It is a fighting game in which the user plays the role of Daniel in fights based on movie scenes. There are also two bonus levels with digitized images from the movie: Miyagi catching flies with chopsticks and Daniel breaking an ice block.

The 1987 Nintendo Entertainment System video game The Karate Kid includes several elements based on The Karate Kid Part II. Stages 2–4 of the game are based on The Karate Kid Part II, as are two bonus games in which the player must break up to six ice blocks. The drum technique exercise shown in the movie is also featured as a challenge in which the gamer must dodge the swinging axe as many times as possible.
