= Yuji Okumoto =

American actor (born 1959)

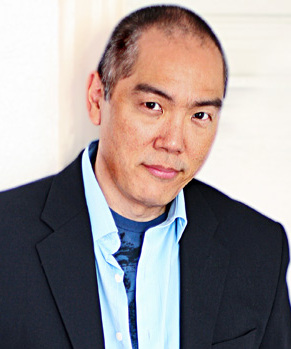
- 2010 press photo
- Born: Donald Yujiro Okumoto; April 20, 1959 (age 67); Los Angeles, California, U.S.
- Education: California State University, Fullerton
- Occupation: Actor
- Years active: 1985–present
- Notable credit(s): Cobra Kai and The Karate Kid
- Height: 180 cm (5 ft 11 in)
- Spouse: Angela Mar
- Children: 3

Donald Yujiro Okumoto (born April 20, 1959) is an American actor. He is best known for his role as Chozen Toguchi in the film The Karate Kid Part II (1986) and its sequel television series Cobra Kai (2021–2025).

He has also appeared in the films Better Off Dead, Real Genius (both 1985), True Believer (1989), American Yakuza (1993), Contact (1997), The Truman Show (1998), Pearl Harbor (2001), Only the Brave (2006), Inception (2010) and Driven (2018).

== Early life ==
Donald Yujiro Okumoto (ドナルド・奥本裕次郎, Donald Yūjiro Okumoto; born April 20, 1959) was born to Japanese parents Yoshiharu and Yemiko Okumoto in Los Angeles on April 20, 1959. His father was a Japanese immigrant who worked as a short-order cook and later a gardener in Los Angeles after World War II, and his mother was born in America, making Okumoto both a Nisei and a Sansei.

He began karate at age 13, studying under various sensei. By the time of The Karate Kid Part II, the 27-year-old Okumoto held a brown belt in Karate, and had learned basic skills in other martial arts, including Taekwondo and Judo. His Judo Instructor was Hayward Nishioka, his Chitō-ryū Karate Sensei was Yukinori Kugimiya, his Kajukenbo Instructor was Sensei Ron Takaragawa, and his Yau Kung Moon Sifu was Kevin Quock.

He graduated from Hollywood High School and Cal State Fullerton, where he studied acting.

== Career ==
His performance in the play Indians led to being signed by an agent, and eventually a role on The Young and the Restless. His first roles were in The Check is in the Mail, Real Genius, and Better Off Dead. Perhaps his most well-known role is as Daniel's rival, Chozen Toguchi in the 1986 film, The Karate Kid Part II. Other credits include his role as Shu Kai Kim, a character based on Chol Soo Lee, in the 1989 film True Believer, Pete Kapahala in the 1999 Disney Channel original movie Johnny Tsunami, Japanese navy lieutenant (海軍大尉, Kaigun-Daii) Zenji Abe in Pearl Harbor, and Bruce Takedo in the television series, Bones.

In 2005, he was Yukio Nakajo in Lane Nishikawa's film Only the Brave about the Japanese American segregated fighting unit, the 442nd Regimental Combat Team of World War II. This film also included two other Karate Kid stars, Tamlyn Tomita and Pat Morita. He is a producer for the 2020 independent film The Paper Tigers, in which he has a small role as well.

In 2021, Okumoto reprised his Karate Kid II role as Chozen Toguchi, who, beginning with Season 3 of Cobra Kai, is now a friend and ally of Daniel.

== Restauranter ==
In 2002, Okumoto, together with his wife and mother-in-law, opened a Hawaiian restaurant called Kona Kitchen in Maple Leaf, Seattle. A second location opened in Lynnwood, Washington in 2019.

== Personal life ==
Okumoto lives in Seattle, Washington, with his wife Angela Okumoto (née Mar) and their three daughters.

Okumoto said he believes "Perfectionism is the death of good acting."

== Filmography ==
=== Film ===
Year	Title	Role	Notes
1985	Crime Killer	Vietnam Soldier	
1985	Real Genius	Fenton	
1985	Better Off Dead	Yee Sook Ree	
1986	The Check Is in the Mail...	Bellboy	
1986	The Karate Kid Part II	Chozen Toguchi	
1988	Aloha Summer	Kenzo Konishi	
1989	True Believer	Shu Kai Kim	
1991	3×3 Eyes	Chou / Transvestite #2 (voice)	English dub
1992	Nemesis	Yoshiro Han	
1993	Silent Cries	Mickey	Uncredited
1993	Robot Wars	Chou-Sing	
1993	Brainsmasher... A Love Story	Wu	
1993	American Yakuza	Kazuo	
1994	Bloodfist V: Human Target	Tommy	
1994	Blue Tiger	Lieutenant Sakagami	
1994	Red Sun Rising	Yuji	
1995	Hard Justice	Jimmy Wong	
1995	3×3 Eyes: Legend of the Divine Demon	Naparva (voice)	English dub
1997	Blast	FBI Agent	
1997	Mean Guns	Hoss	
1997	Contact	Electrical	
1997	The Game	Nikko Hotel Manager	
1998	The Truman Show	Japanese Family Man	
1998	Sorcerers	Secretary	
2000	Fortress 2: Re-Entry	Sato	
2000	I'll Remember April	Matsuo Yomma	
2001	Pearl Harbor	Zenji Abe	
2001	Ticker	Embassy Consul	
2005	The Crow: Wicked Prayer	'Pestilence'	
2006	Big Momma's House 2	Parsons	
2006	Only the Brave	Sergeant Yukio 'Yuk' Nakajo	
2006	End Game	Dr. Lee	
2007	Cookies for Sale	Grumpy Man	Short
2008	Mask of the Ninja	Nikano	
2008	Touch	Ken	Short
2009	Black Coffee	David	Short
2009	Anatomy of a Fly	Politician	Short
2010	Inception	Saito's Attendant	
2014	Awesome Asian Bad Guys	Yuji	
2015	Beta Test	The Surgeon	
2017	Unspoken: Diary of an Assassin	Unknown	
2018	Driven	Judge Takasugi	
2018	Ultra Low	Yuji	
2020	The Paper Tigers	Wing	Also producer
2025	The Cobra Kai Movie Part II	Himself	Short

=== Television ===
Year	Title	Role	Notes
1986	T. J. Hooker	Howie Kalanuma	Episode: "Blood Sport"
1987	Simon & Simon	Masaki	Episode: "Desperately Seeking Dacody"
1988	Hunter	Jimmy	2 episodes
1990	Murder in Paradise	Unknown	Television film
1990	Only One Survived	Peter Fujko	Television film
1990	Midnight Caller	Lee Minh	Episode: "Home to Roost"
1991	American Playhouse	Teruo Kuroda	Episode: "Hot Summer Winds"
1991–95	3×3 Eyes	Naparva, Chou, Yakumo's Coworker (voices)	English dub
1991–93	Knots Landing	Art Nam	6 episodes
1994	Menendez: A Killing in Beverly Hills	Lester Kuriyama	Television film
1995	Lois & Clark: The New Adventures of Superman	Chen Chow	Episode: "Chi of Steel"
1995	Vanishing Son	Nguyen	Episode: "Holy Ghosts"
1995	Murder, She Wrote	Kim Huan	Episode: "Murder a la Mode"
1996	Kindred: The Embraced	Lieutenant Kwan	2 episodes
1996	Superman: The Animated Series	Security Guard	Voice, episode: "A Little Piece of Home"
1996	Walker, Texas Ranger	Chang	Episode: "Higher Power"
1997	Players	Mr. Hayashi	Episode: "Rashocon"
1998	The Sentinel	Lo	Episode: "Love Kills"
1998	JAG	Jiro Kitamura	Episode: "Innocence"
1999	Just Shoot Me!	Kevin Tanaka	Uncredited, episode: "Miss Pretty"
1999	Johnny Tsunami	Pete	Television film
2000	Martial Law	Mr. Strinc	Episode: "Scorpio Rising"
2000	Max Steel	Unknown	Voice, episode: "Seraphim"
2000	Guilty as Charged	Davis	Television film
2001	The District	Officer	Episode: "A Southern Town"
2001	A Kitty Bobo Show	Graffiti	Voice, pilot
2001	V.I.P.	Morton Zhou	Episode: "Crouching Tiger, Hidden Val"
2003	Partners	One Eye	Television film
2007	The Unit	Mr. Michael	Episode: "The Broom Cupboard"
2007	Johnny Kapahala: Back on Board	Pete	Television film
2008	Heroes and Villains	Naomasa Ii	Documentary, episode: "Shogun"
2008	Mask of the Ninja	Nakano	Television film
2009	Katana	Kenji	Episode: "Pilot" (also producer and writer)
2009	Bones	Bruce Takedo	Episode: "The Girl in the Mask"
2011–13	Young Justice	Tseng Dangun, Singh Manh Li, Xaiping	Voice, 3 episodes
2012	The Mentalist	Mr. Liu	Episode: "Red is the New Black"
2013	Grimm	Sheriff Gaffen	Episode: "One Night Stand"
2013	Z Nation	Bernt	Episode: "Philly Feast"
2018	New Girl	Mr. Yukimura	Episode: "Godparents"
2021–25	Cobra Kai	Chozen Toguchi	Recurring role (seasons 3–6)

=== Video games ===
Year	Title	Voice role
1995	Johnny Mnemonic: The Interactive Action Movie	Shinji
2001	Throne of Darkness	Swordsman
2003	True Crime: Streets of LA	Additional voices
2022	Cobra Kai 2: Dojos Rising	Chozen Toguchi
