= Nicole Berger (American actress) =

American actress, model, and pianist (born 2003)

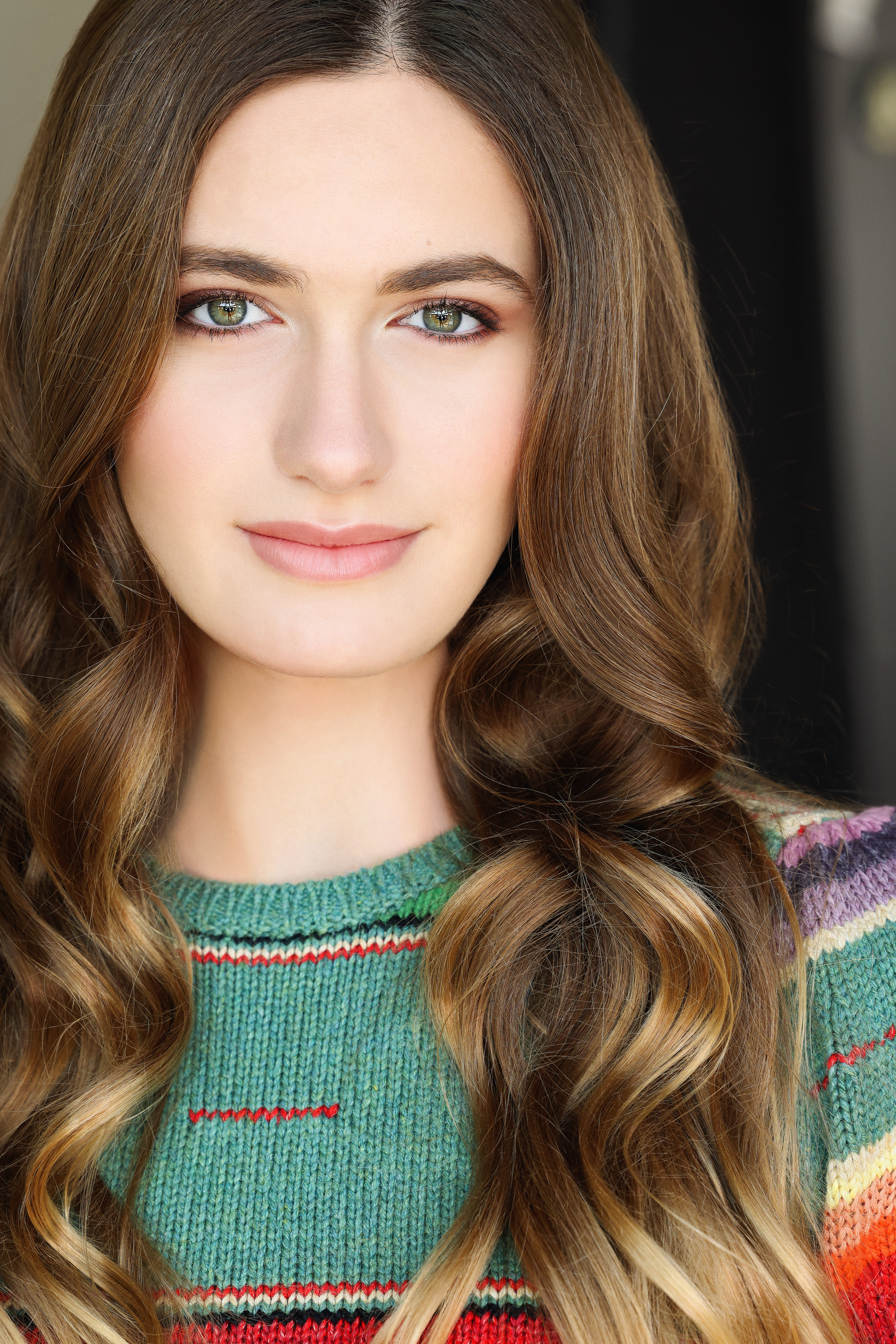
- Berger in 2021
- Born: Nicole Elizabeth Berger; November 27, 2003 (age 22); New York City, New York, U.S.
- Occupation: Actress
- Years active: 2008–present
- Father: Harvey J. Berger

Nicole Elizabeth Berger (born November 27, 2003) is an American actress, model, and pianist who splits her time between Los Angeles, New York and Palm Beach. Her first acting role was in the comedy Goldberg P.I. starring Jackie Mason. She is known for portraying Clover in the crime drama of the same name directed by Jon Abrahams and the guardian angel Esmeralda in The Place of No Words. In 2021, she was chosen as the Best Teen Actress in a Streaming Film released in 2021 by the Young Artist Academy Award for her work in Clover. She also starred as Cecily in the indie thriller Runt, opposite Cameron Boyce. In addition to acting, Berger is a pianist and has modeled for several brands, including Saks Fifth Avenue, Swarovski and Toys R Us.

== Career ==
At the age of 5, Berger began her career as a model, working for brands such as Saks Fifth Avenue, Swarovski, and Toys R Us and 7 For All Mankind. Nicole began taking violin and piano lessons when she was in kindergarten. Berger made her acting debut in Goldberg P.I. at age six.

In 2014, Berger was cast as Beatrice in The Longest Week, a comedy-drama starring Jason Bateman and Olivia Wilde, where she portrayed Olivia's character as a child.

In 2015, her piano skills helped her land the role of Grace Clarke in the film All At Once. In the film, Grace is a piano prodigy who is taken in by a family friend, played by Jon Abrahams, after her parents are killed in the attack on the Twin Towers in New York on 9/11. In the film, Berger played the piano parts herself. All At Once debuted at the Napa Valley Film Festival in 2016 and was shown again at the 2016 Buffalo Dreams Fantastic Film Festival. The film was released to DVD and streaming in 2018.

In 2017, Berger was cast in the crime drama Clover, directed by Jon Abrahams. In the film, she plays the titular character who kills a man and goes on the run. The film was released on video and streaming services in April 2020. For her work in Clover, Berger won the 2021 Young Artist Academy Award for Teen Actress in a Streaming Film Role. After Clover, Berger portrayed the guardian angel, Esmeralda, in The Place of No Words, directed by Mark Webber, which premiered at the Tribeca Film Festival in April 2019.

In July 2018, Berger was cast as Cecily in the indie thriller, Runt, opposite the late Cameron Boyce. The film follows Cameron Boyce's character Cal as he deals with experiences that make him a callous person. Berger's character, Cecily, befriends Cal and helps him navigate life decisions. The film premiered at the Mammoth Film Festival in February 2020, and was released in theaters and on streaming in October 2021.

Also in 2018, Berger worked on an independent film, Ali's Realm, where she played Ali, a young woman who witnesses her friend Charlie die and then befriends him, an imaginary character who appears as an alien. Ali's Realm was chosen for the 2020 New York Film Festival. and Berger won an Award for Best Actress from the Los Angeles Film Awards in December 2020.

In May 2019, Berger filmed Five Teenagers Walk Into A Bar, where she played an almost-famous Instagram model who is one of five teens abandoned in a desert during a field trip. The film premiered in October 2020 at the L.A. Shorts International Film Festival.

== Personal life ==
Berger was born on November 27, 2003, in New York City. She splits her time between New York City, Palm Beach, Florida, and Los Angeles, California, with her parents, Chrysanthi Casseres Berger and Harvey J. Berger, and her sister, Isabella.

Berger attended Fiorello H. LaGuardia High School of Music & Art and Performing Arts as a drama major.

== Filmography ==
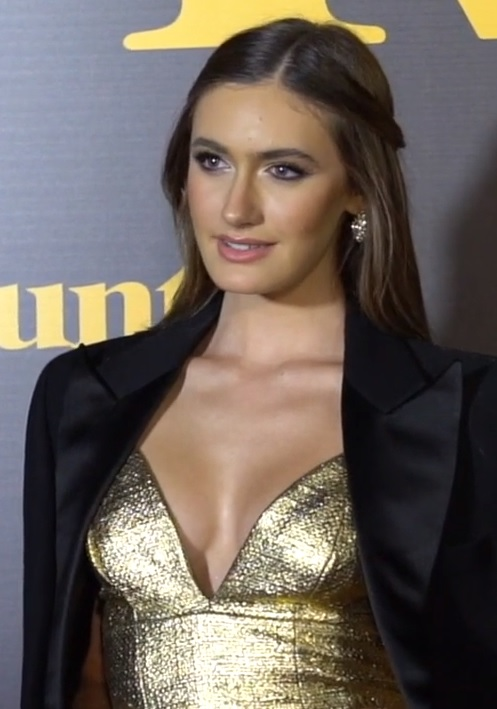
Nicole Elizabeth Berger at Runt Film Premiere, LA, 2021

Film roles
Year	Title	Role	Notes
2011	Goldberg – P.I.	6 year old	
2014	The Longest Week	Young Beatrice	
2015	Prescient	Lydia	
2016	All at Once	Grace	Lead debut
2019	The Place of No Words	Esmeralda	
2020	Runt	Cecily	
2020	Clover	Clover	
2020	Five Teenagers Walk Into a Bar	Natalie	Short film
2020	Ali's Realm	Ali	Short film
2024	Black Spines	Jessica	
TBA	Contra	Lisa	
TBA	Eleven Missing Days †		Filming
