= Joan Brugge =

American biologist

- Education: Northwestern University; Baylor College of Medicine
- Scientific career
- Workplaces: Harvard Medical School; State University of New York; ARIAD Pharmaceuticals; University of Pennsylvania
- Academic advisors: Raymond L. Erikson

Joan S. Brugge is the Louise Foote Pfeiffer Professor of Cell Biology and the Director of the Ludwig Center at Harvard Medical School, where she also served as the Chair of the Department of Cell Biology from 2004 to 2014. Her research focuses on cancer biology, and she has been recognized for her explorations into the Rous sarcoma virus, extracellular matrix adhesion, and epithelial tumor progression in breast cancer.

== Education ==
Brugge originally intended on pursuing a career as a mathematics instructor. While she was attending Northwestern University as an undergraduate student, her sister developed a brain tumor. This event sparked a newfound passion for biology and specifically cancer research. While Brugge was completing her undergraduate degree in biology, she became interested in tumor virology, which refers to the study of how viruses can affect and in some cases produce cancerous cells. This focus led her to the Baylor College of Medicine in Houston, Texas, which housed one of the only virology programs in the country at the time. Brugge graduated with her doctorate degree in virology in 1975.

== Career ==
After the completion of her doctorate degree, Brugge joined Dr. Ray Erikson at the University of Colorado for her postdoctorate work. It was there that she and Tony Purchio discovered the protein product of the Rous Sarcoma virus v-SRC gene. Brugge subsequently identified the protein product of the cellular gene (c-Src) from which v-Src derived. These discoveries were major breakthroughs in cancer research, as v-SRC and c-Src were the first viral and cellular oncoprotein identified and paved the way to subsequent studies on the mechanism of oncogenic transformation.

In 1979, Brugge took an assistant professor position at the State University of New York (SUNY) at Stony Brook, eventually becoming a Professor of Microbiology. She continued her studies on the Rous sarcoma virus (RSV) that she had discovered in her postdoctorate work. Much of her research centered on finding the role of pp60src, which is the protein that is coded for by RSV. Brugge then moved on to the same position at the University of Pennsylvania in 1989. During this time, she was also named an Investigator for the Howard Hughes Medical Institute, which is an assembly of medical scientists and researchers that advances biomedical research for the benefit of the general public.

In 1992, Brugge joined ARIAD Pharmaceuticals in Cambridge, Massachusetts as its Scientific Director. ARIAD primarily focuses on making drugs for the treatment of cancers with limited treatment options. After five years in industry, however, Brugge chose to return to the academic world in order to place a bigger focus on her own research. She took a position as a Professor in the Department of Cell Biology at Harvard Medical School in 1997, and served as the Chair of the department from 2003 to 2014. Brugge has redirected her most recent research efforts because, in her own words, "we were kind of lured into areas that were pretty far from cancer, so I really wanted to go back to cancer." Her lab focuses on elucidating the cellular processes and signaling pathways that are involved in the initiation and progression of epithelial tumors, primarily of the breast and ovary.

== Awards and honors ==
Brugge is a member of the American Society of Cell Biologists (ASCB). She received the society's annual Sandra K. Masur Senior Leadership Award in 2001 and was inducted as a Fellow in 2016. Brugge was awarded an American Cancer Society Research Professorship in 2001, and her work has been funded by the Breast Cancer Research Foundation. Some of Brugge's other recognitions include:

- 2017 - American Cancer Society Medal of Honor for Basic Research
- 2014 - The Brinker Award for Scientific Distinction, Susan G. Komen Foundation
- 2014 - Elected Fellow, American Association for Cancer Research Academy
- 2013 - The Bloomingdale's Award, Breast Cancer Research Foundation
- 2013 - Elected Fellow, Massachusetts Academy of Sciences
- 2012 - Komen Scholar, Scientific Advisory Board, Susan G. Komen Foundation
- 2011-2014 - Board of Directors, American Association for Cancer Research
- 2011 - AACR Distinguished Lectureship in Breast Cancer Research
- 2004 - National Institutes of Health MERIT Award
- 2002 - Senior Career Recognition Award, American Society of Cell Biology
- 2001 - Elected Member, Institute of Medicine
- 2001 - Elected Member, National Academy of Sciences, Washington, DC
- 2000 - Elected Fellow, American Academy of Arts and Sciences

== Selected publications ==
- Brugge, JS, and RL Erikson. "Identification of a transformation-specific antigen induced by an avian sarcoma virus." Nature 269.5626 (1977): 346–8.
- Brugge, JS, E Erikson, RL Erikson. "The specific interaction of the Rous sarcoma virus transforming protein, pp60src, with two cellular proteins." Cell 25.2 (1981): 263–72.
- Bolen, JB, CJ Thiele, MA Israel, W Yonemoto, LA Gipsich, and JS Brugge. "Enhancement of cellular src gene product associated tyrosyl kinase activity following polyoma virus infection and transformation." Cell 38 (1984): 767–77.
- Thomas, SM, M DeMarco, G D'Arcangelo, G Halegoua and JS Brugge. "Ras is essential for nerve growth factor- and phorbol ester-induced tyrosine phosphorylation of MAP kinases." Cell 68 (1992): 1031–40.
- Golden, A, and JS Brugge. "Thrombin treatment induces rapid changes in tyrosine phosphorylation in platelets." Proc. Natl. Acad. Sci. USA 86 (1989): 901–5.
- Debnath, J, KR Mills, NL Collins, MJ Reginato, SK Muthuswamy, and JS Brugge. "The role of apoptosis in creating and maintaining luminal space within normal and oncogene-expressing mammary acini." Cell 111.1 (2002): 29–40.
- Schafer, ZT, AR Grassian, L Song, Z Jiang, Z Gerhart-Hines, HY Irie, S Gao, P Puigserver, and JS Brugge. "Antioxidant and oncogene rescue of metabolic defects caused by loss of matrix attachment." Nature 461.7260 (2009): 109–13.
- Muranen, T, LM Selfors, DT Worster, MP Iwanicki, L Song, FC Morales, S Gao, GB Mills and JS Brugge. "Inhibition of PI3K/mTOR leads to adaptive resistance in matrix-attached cancer cells." Cancer Cell 21.2 (2012): 227–39.
