= Cyrus Arnold =

American actor (born 2003)

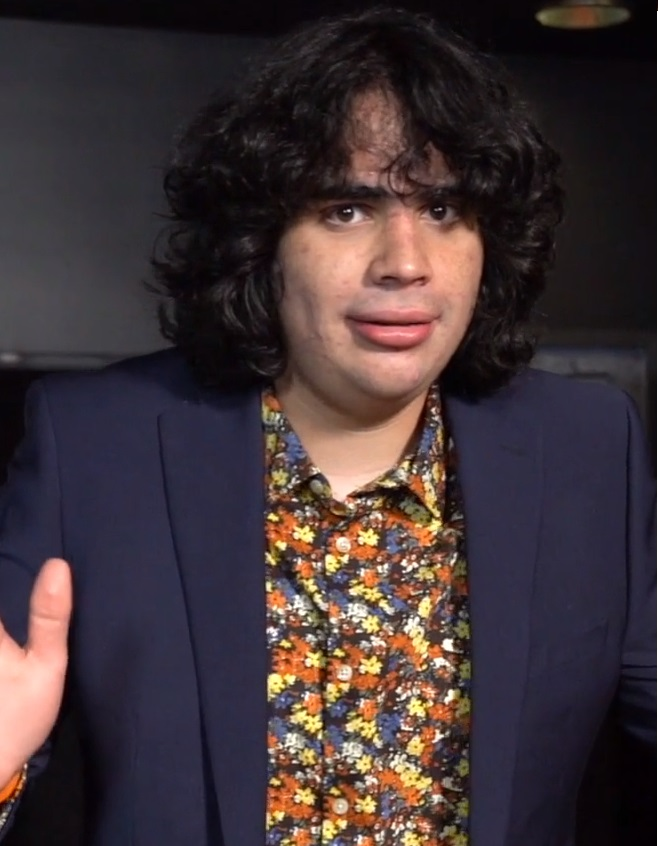
- Arnold in 2021
- Born: January 2, 2003 (age 23); Burbank, California, U.S.
- Occupation: Actor
- Years active: 2011–present

Cyrus Arnold (born January 2, 2003) is an American actor. He began his career as a child actor, primarily guest-starring on various television programs, including playing BJ Malloy on the Nickelodeon sitcom Sam & Cat (2013–2014), before being cast as Derek Zoolander Jr. in the comedy film Zoolander 2 (2016) and David "Truck" Johnson III in the second season of the Fox series The Exorcist (2017).

Arnold has also appeared in other films such as Hardcore Henry (2015), Runt (2020), 8-Bit Christmas, Diary of a Wimpy Kid (both 2021), Mr. Harrigan's Phone (2022), and Family Switch (2023), as well as voicing Jawbreaker in the Nickelodeon animated series Transformers: EarthSpark (2022–2025).

== Early life ==
Arnold was born in Burbank, California, the son of Lea Anne Wolfe and Blake Arnold. He has a younger brother. Arnold was just 8 years old when he had his first taste of acting.

== Career ==
Arnold made his television debut in 2013 at the age of 10, in an episode of the IFC television series Comedy Bang! Bang!. Shortly after that, he had a recurring role in the Nickelodeon sitcom Sam & Cat where he played BJ Malloy, the childhood "friend" of Dice, played by Cameron Ocasio. He subsequently had guest roles in the television shows About a Boy, Richie Rich, Bones, Goldie & Bear, Fresh Off the Boat, Veronica Mars, and Outmatched.

Arnold made his film debut as a young bully in Hardcore Henry. The film premiered at the 2015 Toronto International Film Festival in September 2015, and was released theatrically on April 8, 2016. Also in 2016, he played Derek Zoolander Jr., the estranged son of Derek Zoolander (played by director Ben Stiller) in the comedy Zoolander 2. In August 2017, he was cast in a recurring role as David "Truck" Johnson III in the second season of the Fox series The Exorcist.

Arnold had a starring role as Borgie in the indie film Runt, opposite Cameron Boyce and Nicole Berger. The film premiered at the Mammoth Film Festival in February 2020, and was released on October 9, 2021. He also had a starring role in the indie film Run Hide Fight, which premiered at the Venice Film Festival in September 2020, and was released by The Daily Wire on their subscription platform on January 14, 2021. Also in 2021, he was cast in an episode of the Disney+ series Just Beyond, appeared in the HBO Max film 8-Bit Christmas as Josh Jagorski, and voiced a character in the animated Diary of a Wimpy Kid film. In 2022, he portrayed Kenny Yankovich in the Netflix film Mr. Harrigan's Phone, a film adaptation of the short story of the same name from the If It Bleeds collection by Stephen King. He also began voicing Jawbreaker in the Nickelodeon series Transformers: EarthSpark. In 2023, he was cast in the comedy film Family Switch, also for Netflix.

== Filmography ==
=== Film ===
Year	Title	Role	Notes
2015	Hardcore Henry	Nat/Young Bully #2	
2016	Zoolander 2	Derek Zoolander Jr.	
2017	Men	Leslie	Short film
2020	Runt	Borgie	
2020	Run Hide Fight	Kip Quade	
2021	8-Bit Christmas	Josh Jagorski	
2021	Diary of a Wimpy Kid	Carter (voice)	
2022	Mr. Harrigan's Phone	Kenny Yankovich	
2022	Murmur	Angel	
2023	Baby Blue	August/Beans	Also co-producer
2023	Family Switch	Hunter Drew	

=== Television ===
Year	Title	Role	Notes
2013	Comedy Bang! Bang!	Terry Jetski	Episode: "Andy Richter Wears a Suit Jacket & a Baby Blue Button Down Shirt"
2013–2014	Sam & Cat	B.J. Malloy	2 episodes
2014	About a Boy	Kid #1	Episode: "About a House for Sale"
2015	Richie Rich	Alfonso	Episode: "Good Deeds"
2017	Bones	Evan	Episode: "The New Tricks in the Old Dogs"
2017	The Exorcist	David "Truck" Johnson III	Recurring role (9 episodes)
2018	Goldie & Bear	Colton (voice)	Episode: "Horsin' Around"
2019	Fresh Off the Boat	Ben	Episode: "Rancho Contento"
2019	Veronica Mars	Barton Netherfield, Jr.	Episode: "Entering a World of Pain"
2020	Players	Caleb	3 episodes
2020	Outmatched	Atticus	Episode: "Couple's Friends"
2020	Royalties	Kevin	Episode: "I Am So Much Better Than You at Everything"
2021	Just Beyond	Trevor Larkin	Episode: "Standing Up for Yourself"
2022–2025	Transformers: EarthSpark	Jawbreaker Malto (voice)	Main role
