= Erika Christensen =

American actress (born 1982)

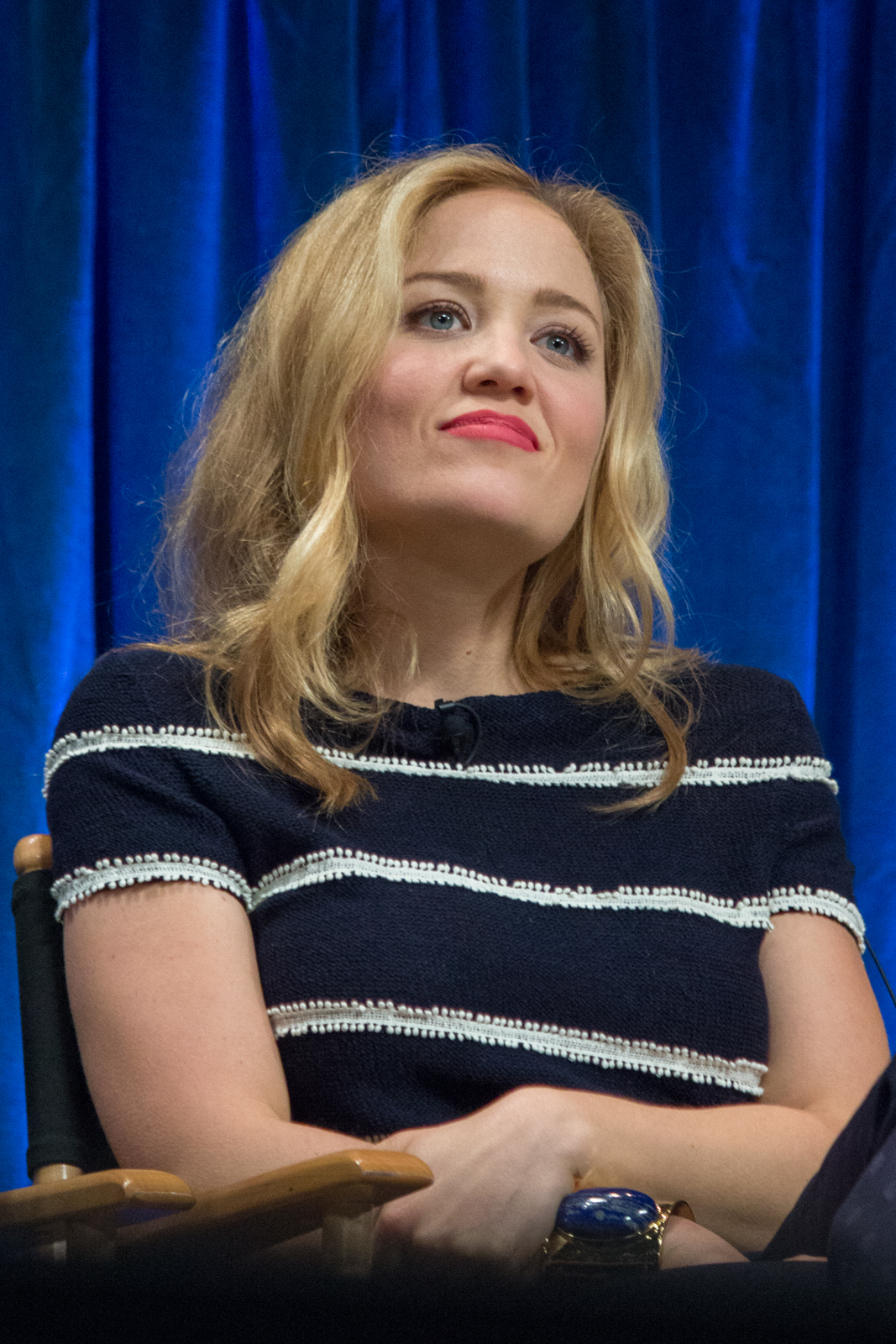
- Christensen in March 2013
- Born: Erika Jane Christensen; August 19, 1982 (age 44); Seattle, Washington, U.S.
- Occupation: Actress
- Years active: 1997–present
- Spouse: Cole Maness (m. 2015)
- Children: 2

Erika Jane Christensen (born August 19, 1982) is an American actress. Her filmography includes roles in Traffic (2000), Swimfan (2002), The Banger Sisters (2002), The Perfect Score (2004), Flightplan (2005), How to Rob a Bank (2007), The Tortured (2010), and The Case for Christ (2017). For her performance in Traffic, she won the MTV Movie Award for Breakthrough Female Performance and the Screen Actors Guild Award for Outstanding Performance by a Cast in a Motion Picture along with her co-stars.

In 2006, she starred on the short-lived drama series Six Degrees on ABC. From 2010 until its ending in 2015, Christensen starred as Julia Braverman-Graham on the NBC family drama series Parenthood. In 2014, she won a Gracie Award for her performance in the role. In 2015, Christensen portrayed Betty Beaumontaine on ABC's short-lived crime drama series Wicked City and in 2017, she portrayed Ali Petrovich on another short-lived ABC crime drama series, Ten Days in the Valley.

Since 2023, she has been appearing as Angie Polaski in ABC's Will Trent.

== Early life ==
Christensen was born in Seattle, Washington, the daughter of Kathy (née Hendricks), a construction manager, and Steven Christensen, an insurance worker and human resources executive. She has an older half-brother, Nick, and two younger twin brothers, Dane (who appeared in the 2005 film The Upside of Anger) and Brando.

Christensen lived in Seattle until age four, when her family relocated to suburban Los Angeles, California. She started out acting on television in commercials for McDonald's and Volvo. Christensen is a member of the Church of Scientology. Her parents became Scientologists in their 20s while living in Seattle, and raised her as a Scientologist. Her parents also decided to home school her.

== Career ==
=== 1997–2006: Beginnings ===
Christensen began her professional career with a supporting role in the comedy film Leave It to Beaver, and a one-episode guest appearance on the drama series Nothing Sacred, both of which were released/aired in 1997. She went on to guest star in numerous other television series in the late 1990s, including Frasier, The Practice, 3rd Rock from the Sun, and Touched by an Angel. She also starred in the Disney Channel original movie Can of Worms in 1999. Also in 1999, she starred as Abigail Winthrop on the short-lived CBS sitcom Thanks. That same year, she featured in Michael Jackson's music video for his song "Childhood", alongside actress Jena Malone.

For her performance as cocaine user Caroline Wakefield in Steven Soderbergh's crime drama film Traffic (2000), she received the awards for Breakthrough Female Performance at the MTV Movie Awards, Standout Performance – Female at the Young Hollywood Awards, and Outstanding Performance by a Cast in a Motion Picture at the Screen Actors Guild Awards. Also in 2000, Christensen guest starred in single episodes of Time of Your Life, Movie Stars, FreakyLinks, and The Pretender. In 2001, she had a recurring role on the sitcom The Geena Davis Show. She also appeared in an episode of the Fox sitcom That '70s Show, reuniting her with her Traffic co-star Topher Grace. She was named one of People's "Breakthrough Stars of 2001". The following year, Christensen starred in three feature films: the teen thriller Swimfan, the crime drama Home Room, and the comedy The Banger Sisters.

In 2003, Christensen starred in MTV's television film adaptation of Wuthering Heights, based on the Emily Brontë novel of the same name. She also recorded multiple songs for the film's soundtrack. In 2004, she starred in the teen heist film The Perfect Score, and the horror film Riding the Bullet. In 2005, Christensen recorded a version of "Let's Fall in Love" with John Stevens for his debut album Red. Also in 2005, Christensen co-starred in the films The Upside of Anger as Andy Wolfmeyer, co-starring Kevin Costner and Joan Allen; The Sisters as Irene Prior, with Maria Bello and Elizabeth Banks; and Flightplan as Fiona, starring Jodie Foster. The following year, she starred in the series Six Degrees, which debuted on the ABC fall schedule on September 21, 2006. Low ratings caused its cancellation after one season, leaving five episodes unaired.

=== 2007–2015: Parenthood ===
In 2007, she appeared in the comedy-drama film Gardener of Eden, and the independent crime comedy How to Rob a Bank. In 2008 and 2009, she guest starred as a special agent on Law & Order: Special Victims Unit, a college student with dissociative identity disorder on Lie to Me, and a victim of domestic abuse on Mercy. Christensen made a cameo in the Joaquin Phoenix-directed music video "Tired of Being Sorry" for Balthazar Getty's band Ringside. In 2009, she was part of the cast of the film adaptation of Veronika Decides to Die, and starred in the romantic drama Mercy alongside James Caan and Dylan McDermott.

In 2010, Christensen co-starred with Jesse Metcalfe in the horror-thriller film The Tortured.

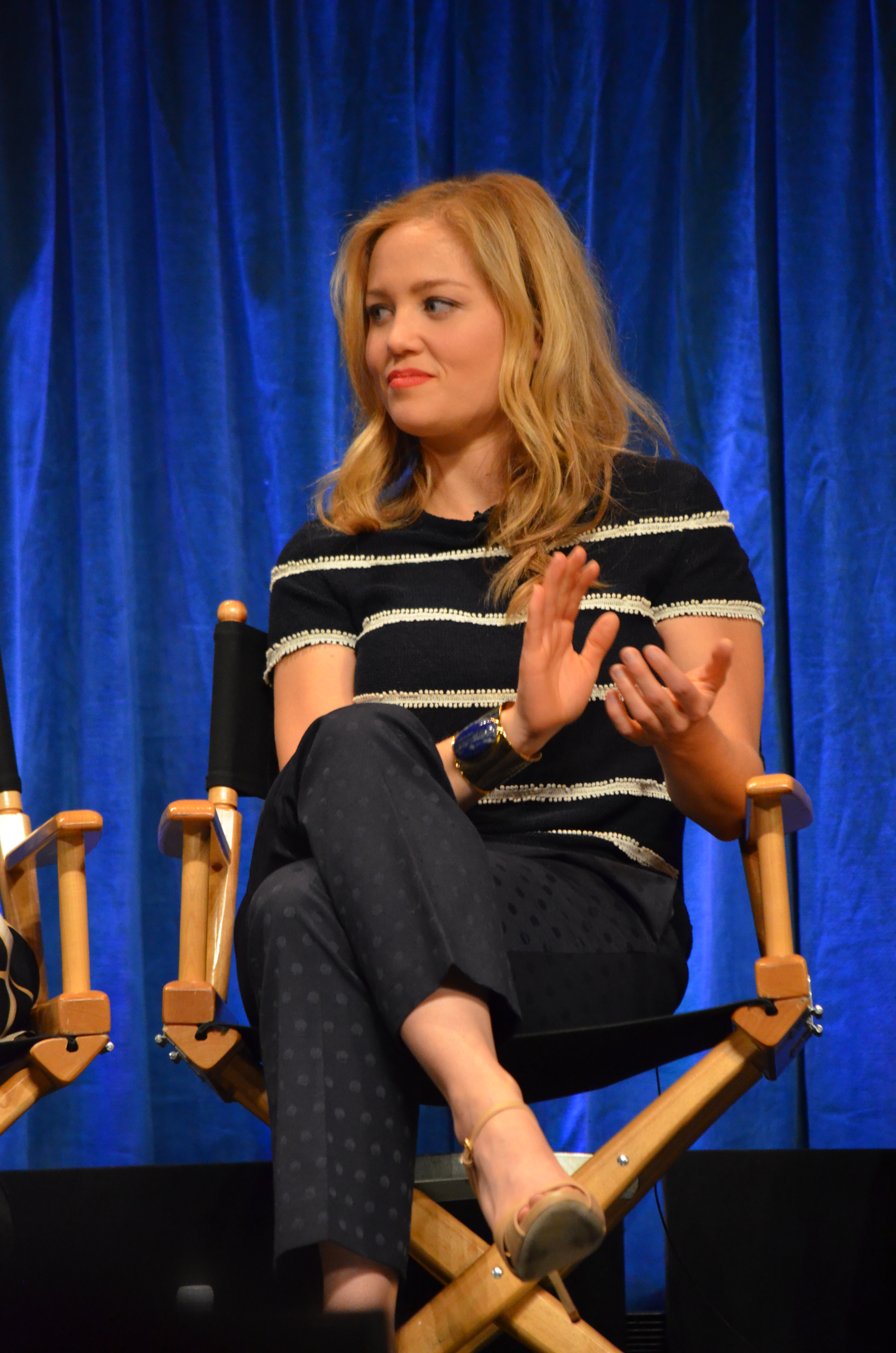
Christensen at the 2013 PaleyFest for Parenthood

Christensen was a regular cast member on the NBC drama television series Parenthood, which debuted on March 2, 2010, and concluded on January 29, 2015. She portrayed the role of Julia Braverman-Graham, the youngest daughter of the Braverman family. She won the 2014 Gracie Award for Outstanding Female Actor in a Supporting Role in a Drama Series for her performance in the series.

In 2013, Christensen starred in the musical film How Sweet It Is, directed by Brian Herzlinger, and was a guest judge on 2 episodes of the cooking competition series Knife Fight. The following year, she appeared on the celebrity game show Hollywood Game Night, and lead the cast of the Hallmark Channel television film My Boyfriends' Dogs, based on the Dandi Daley Mackall novel of the same name.

In February 2015, she was cast in the short-lived ABC crime drama series Wicked City as Betty Beaumontaine, a single mother who becomes romantically involved with a serial killer. Also in 2015, she partnered with food company Lean Cuisine to launch their brand overhaul. In September 2015, Christensen was among several celebrities to appear in the music video "Love" for Dash Mihok's band Diz and the Fam.

=== 2016–present ===
Christensen led the cast of the Hallmark Channel television film Anything for Love co-starring with Paul Greene. The film was released on February 14, 2016. The following month, she starred in the music video "All Is Forgiven" for Sal Masekela's band Alekesam. Christensen next appeared as part of the all-star cast of HBO's courtroom drama film Confirmation, directed by Rick Famuyiwa and co-starring Kerry Washington, Wendell Pierce, and Greg Kinnear. The same year, Christensen starred in Jon Abrahams' directorial debut film Two for One, which had its world premiere at the Napa Valley Film Festival.

In 2017, she co-starred with Mike Vogel and Robert Forster in the Lee Strobel biopic The Case for Christ, in the role of Strobel's wife Leslie. That same year, Christensen began starring as Ali Petrovich in the ABC drama series Ten Days in the Valley, alongside Kyra Sedgwick. She starred in Jon Abrahams' second film, the comedy mob thriller Clover, alongside Mark Webber, Julia Jones, and Ron Perlman.

== Personal life ==
In November 2014, Christensen became engaged to cyclist Cole Maness. They married on September 5, 2015, in Palm Springs, California, and reside in Los Feliz, Los Angeles. The couple has two daughters.

== Honors ==
On May 17, 2023, Christensen received the Mark of Excellence award at the Annual Medinova NY Dinner Gala, hosted by MC Ciano Joasil, a non-profit organization raising funds for hospitals in underserved areas of Haiti.

== Filmography ==
=== Film ===
Year	Title	Role	Notes	Refs.
1997	Leave It to Beaver	Karen L. Connelly		
2000	Traffic	Caroline Wakefield		
2002	Home Room	Deanna Cartwright		
2002	Swimfan	Madison Bell		
2002	The Banger Sisters	Hannah Kingsley		
2004	The Perfect Score	Anna Ross		
2004	Riding the Bullet	Jessica Hadley		
2005	The Upside of Anger	Andy Wolfmeyer		
2005	The Sisters	Irene Prior		
2005	Flightplan	Fiona		
2007	Gardener of Eden	Mona Huxley		
2007	How to Rob a Bank	Jessica		
2008	Struck	Bus Stop Girl	Short	
2009	Mercy	Robin		
2009	Veronika Decides to Die	Claire		
2010	Melon	Catherine	Short	
2010	The Tortured	Elise Landry		
2013	How Sweet It Is	Sarah Cosmo		
2016	All at Once	Tiffany Fontinella	Working title: Two for One	
2017	The Case for Christ	Leslie Strobel		
2020	Clover	Gertie		
2022	Kimi	Samantha Gerrity		
2022	Cheaper by the Dozen	Kate		

=== Television ===
Year	Title	Role	Notes	Refs.
1997	Nothing Sacred	Romy Carrol	Episode: "House of Rage"	
1998	The Practice	Melissa	Episode: "The Pursuit of Dignity"	
1998	Frasier	Teenager	Episode: "Frasier's Curse"	
1998	3rd Rock from the Sun	Brianna	Episode: "Collect Call for Dick"	
1999	Can of Worms	Katelyn Sandman	TV movie	
1999	Thanks	Abigail Winthrop	Main role	
1999	Touched by an Angel	Ivy	Episode: "Voice of an Angel"	
2000	Time of Your Life	Flynn Halloway	Episode: "The Time She Turned 21"	
2000	Movie Stars	Tawny	Episode: "La Vida Loca"	
2000	The Pretender	Leigh Wright	Episode: "Corn Man"	
2000	FreakyLinks	Cassie	Episode: "Subject: Coelacanth This!"	
2001	The Geena Davis Show	Isabel	3 episodes	
2001	That '70s Show	Stacey	Episode: "Red and Stacey"	
2003	Wuthering Heights	Cate Earnshaw	TV movie	
2005–2009	Robot Chicken	Various characters	3 episodes	
2006–2007	Six Degrees	Mae Anderson	Main role	
2007	I'm In Hell	Jennifer	TV movie	
2008	Law & Order: Special Victims Unit	Special Agent Lauren Cooper	Episode: "Signature"	
2009	Lie to Me	Sophie Howell	Episode: "The Core of It"	
2009	Mercy	Dana Harper McPhearson	Episode: "Destiny, Meet My Daughter, Veronica"	
2010–2015	Parenthood	Julia Braverman-Graham	Main role	
2014	My Boyfriends' Dogs	Bailey Daley	TV movie	
2015	Wicked City	Betty Beaumontaine	Main role	
2016	Anything for Love	Katherine Benson	TV movie	
2016	Confirmation	Shirley Weigand	TV movie	
2016	The Follower	Chelsea Angel	TV movie	
2017	Ten Days in the Valley	Ali Petrovich	Main role	
2018	Adopted	Rebekah	Episode: "Julie's New Husband"	
2019	To Have and to Hold	Alice	TV movie main role	
2023–present	Will Trent	Angie Polaski	Main role	

=== Music videos ===
Year	Title	Role	Artist	Director	Refs.
1995	"Childhood"	Girl	Michael Jackson	Nicholas Brandt	
2004	"Everything" (original/The Perfect Score version)	—N/a	Fefe Dobson	Chris Robinson	
2010	"Tired of Being Sorry"	Bridesmaid	Ringside	Joaquin Phoenix	
2015	"Love"	Woman	Diz and the Fam	Dash Mihok	
2016	"All Is Forgiven"	Woman	Alekesam	Toby Louie	
2016	"Where's the Love?"	Herself	Black Eyed Peas featuring The World	Michael Jurkovac	
2019	"Whenever You're Around"	Woman	Bootstraps	Sam Jaeger	

== Awards and nominations ==
Year	Award	Category	Work	Result	Refs.
1998	YoungStar Awards	Best Performance by a Young Actress in a Drama Series	Nothing Sacred	Nominated	
2001	Young Hollywood Awards	Standout Performance – Female	Traffic	Won	
2001	Teen Choice Awards	Film – Choice Breakout Performance	Traffic	Nominated	
2001	Screen Actors Guild Awards	Outstanding Performance by a Cast in a Motion Picture	Traffic	Won	
2001	Online Film & Television Association Awards	Best Youth Performance	Traffic	Nominated	
2001	MTV Movie Awards	Breakthrough Female Performance	Traffic	Won	
2014	Gracie Awards	Outstanding Female Actor in a Supporting Role in a Drama Series	Parenthood	Won	

== Works cited ==
- Christensen, Erika (September 11, 2018). "Inside of You with Michael Rosenbaum" (Interview). Interviewed by Michael Rosenbaum – via Player.FM.
