= My Boyfriends' Dogs =

- Official poster
- Based on: My Boyfriends' Dogs by Dandi Daley Mackall
- Written by: Jon Maas; Gary Goldstein
- Directed by: Terry Ingram
- Starring: Erika Christensen; Teryl Rothery; Jeremy Guilbaut; Emily Holmes; Joyce DeWitt; Michael Kopsa
- Music by: Michael Richard Plowman
- Country of origin: United States
- Original language: English

Production
- Producer: Christian Bruyère
- Editor: Tony Dean Smith
- Running time: 84 minutes
- Production companies: Gross-Weston Productions; Howard Braunstein Films

Original release
- Network: Hallmark Channel
- Release: October 18, 2014

My Boyfriends' Dogs is a 2014 American made-for-television comedy film directed by Terry Ingram, written by Jon Maas and Gary Goldstein, and based on the Dandi Daley Mackall novel of the same name. The film stars Erika Christensen as Bailey Daley, with Teryl Rothery, Emily Holmes, Jeremy Guilbaut, Joyce DeWitt, and Michael Kopsa. It was broadcast on the Hallmark Channel in the United States on October 18, 2014.

== Plot ==
The owners of a small diner are surprised at closing time when a woman (Christensen) in a wedding dress arrives with 3 dogs and begs to come into the restaurant. What follows is her retelling of how she arrived at this junction in her life and how, through the search for the right man, she ended up as a runaway bride with three dogs.

== Summary ==
Bailey (Erika Christensen) meets Wade (Jesse Hutch), who has a dog named Adam, a golden retriever. She also meets Cole (Tyron Leitso), who owns Cole's Pet Stop. She meets Jonathan (Oliver Rice) at an art gallery; he has a dog named Eve, a dalmatian.

Bailey and Amber (Emily Holmes) meet Eric (Jeremy Guilbaut) at yoga class. Eric teaches Bailey how to golf. Eric's mother picks a dog called "Shih-Tzu". Bailey named Eric's dog Shirley after her sister. Bailey now has three dogs of her own.

Eric and Bailey get married but Bailey decides to run away with her dogs. She can't find the right guy for her. Nikki tells Bailey her stories: she works at a restaurant waiting for her prince charming walking through the door. Cole is sitting with a book every night.

== Cast ==
- Erika Christensen as Bailey Daley
- Teryl Rothery as Dina
- Jeremy Guilbaut as Eric
- Emily Holmes as Amber
- Joyce DeWitt as Nikki
- Michael Kopsa as Louie
- Jesse Hutch as Wade
- Tyron Leitso as Cole
- Oliver Rice as Jonathan
- Jeb Beach as Travis
- Malcolm Stewart as Martin Strang
- Linda Sorenson as Grandma Strang
- P. Lynn Johnson as Eleanor Strang
- Samuel Patrick Chu as Evan
- Louriza Tronco as Tessa

== Reception ==
The film received mixed reviews from television critics. David Hinckley of New York Daily News wrote: "You wouldn't think a Hallmark movie that stars a plucky, winsome blond and several lovable dogs could miss. My Boyfriends' Dogs almost does. It's got too much of the right stuff to be a complete mutt, but most Hallmark movies are better written and crafted than this one." Nancy Dunham of The Washington Times gave a mixed review, writing: "Erika Christensen brings a sense of realism to the role, even when some dialogue seems a bit preachy and scenes might stretch credibility a tad far... Like Walt Disney films, My Boyfriends' Dogs isn't going to make a huge impact on art, but it might show the best way to be true to one's heart."
