= Aramis Knight =

American actor (born 1999)

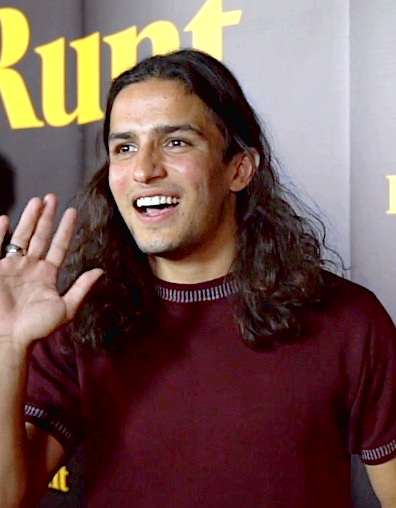
- Knight at Runt premiere in 2021
- Born: October 3, 1999 (age 26); Los Angeles, California, U.S.
- Occupation: Actor
- Years active: 2005–present

Aramis Knight (born October 3, 1999) is an American actor. After appearing as a child actor on television shows, including Boston Legal (2005), Dexter (2008), Lost (2010), The Middle (2010), and Psych (2011), he has since starred on television in Into the Badlands (2015–2019) and Ms. Marvel (2022) and on film in Runt (2020), Centurion: The Dancing Stallion (2023), and Karate Kid: Legends (2025).

== Early life ==
Knight was born on October 3, 1999, in Los Angeles, California and grew up in Woodland Hills. He is of Pakistani, English, Irish, and German descent.

== Career ==
Knight has appeared on television in Boston Legal (2005), Dexter (2008), Lost (2010), The Middle (2010), Psych (2011), NCIS (2011), and Scorpion (2015). His film credits include Rendition (2007) and Crossing Over (2009). Knight portrayed Bean, the best friend of main character Ender Wiggin, in the science fiction/fantasy film Ender's Game (2013).

Knight has also done voice acting for multiple projects, including Shrek Forever After and Happy Feet Two.

From 2015 to 2019, Knight played the lead role of M.K., "a boy with unexplained magic powers", in Into the Badlands (2015–2019). Into the Badlands is an AMC television series described as "a high-octane sci-fi martial arts series" and as a "post-apocalyptic martial arts drama". Knight, along with other cast members, received several weeks of martial arts training for his role.

Knight also starred as Kareem / Red Dagger in the 2022 television series Ms. Marvel.

On film, Knight has starred as Vic in Runt (2020), as Danny Sanchez in Centurion: The Dancing Stallion (2023), and as Conor Day in Karate Kid: Legends (2025).

== Filmography ==
=== Film ===
Year	Title	Role	Notes
2007	Rendition	Jeremy El-Ibrahimi	
2009	Crossing Over	Juan Sanchez	
2010	Valentine's Day	Romeo Midnight	Uncredited
2012	The Dark Knight Rises	Kid with Apple	
2013	Ender's Game	Bean	
2020	Runt	Vic	
2023	Centurion: The Dancing Stallion	Danny Sanchez	
2025	Karate Kid: Legends	Conor Day	

=== Television ===
Year	Title	Role	Notes
2005	Boston Legal	Tito Perez	2 episodes
2005	Invasion	Hispanic Boy	Pilot
2006	Day Break	Jenga Player	Episode: "What If They Run"
2006	Cold Case	Emilio Valens	Episode: "The War at Home"
2008	Dexter	Carlos	Recurring role
2009	Ghost Whisperer	Gus	Episode: "Dead Listing"
2009	Hatching Pete	Wendell Pate	Disney Channel Original Movie
2010	The Whole Truth	Justin Brogan	Recurring role
2010	Sons of Tucson	Boy #2	Episode: "Kisses and Beads"
2010	The Middle	Mitch	Episode: "TV or Not TV"
2010	Lost	Sam	Episode: "Sundown"
2011	General Hospital	Young Sonny	Recurring role
2011	Psych	Justin	Episode: "Shawn Rescues Darth Vader"
2011	Rizzoli & Isles	Joey Mateo	Episode: "Brown Eyed Girl"
2011	Parenthood	Judah	Episode: "Amazing Andy and His Wonderful World of Bugs"
2011	NCIS	Nick Miller	Episode: "Freedom"
2014	Girl Meets World	Brandon	Episode: "Girl Meets Friendship"
2015	Scorpion	Paco	Episode: "Going South"
2015–2019	Into the Badlands	M.K.	Main role
2022	Ms. Marvel	Kareem / Red Dagger	Main cast
