= How to Rob a Bank (2007 film) =

- Directed by: Andrews Jenkins
- Written by: Andrews Jenkins
- Produced by: Rick Lashbrook, Darby Parker, Arthur Sarkissian, Tim O'Hair
- Starring: Nick Stahl; Erika Christensen; Gavin Rossdale; Terry Crews; Adriano Aragon; David Carradine
- Distributed by: IFC First Take
- Release dates: June 25, 2007 (Los Angeles Film Festival); January 25, 2008 (United States)
- Running time: 81 minutes
- Country: United States
- Language: English
- Box office: $1,006 (United States)

How to Rob a Bank (and 10 Tips to Actually Get Away with It) is an American independent crime comedy film. It finished filming in March 2006. It premiered at the 2007 Los Angeles Film Festival, and opened in limited release in the United States on February 8, 2008. The film is about a man who gets caught in the middle of a bank robbery, ending up in the vault with one of the robbers he then treats as a hostage. After grossing $1,006 in the domestic market, the film was released on DVD on September 2, 2008. The film makes many references to the famous British pop band Duran Duran.

== Plot ==
As he tries to access an ATM to retrieve his last twenty bucks, Jason “JINX” Taylor runs into a snag: the transaction fee will overdraw him, and he cannot get his money out of the bank. Jinx fumes about this and other hidden charges which complicate his life, as it is revealed he is locked in a bank vault, with the beautiful tied-up Jessica apparently his hostage. Jessica is kept gagged with tape on her mouth. But, as Jinx rails against corporations and how they stack the deck, we realize that the situation is very different from what it appears: in fact, it is Jessica, not Jinx, who was robbing the bank, with a group of armed robbers led by Simon. However, Jinx’s entry into the scenario had upset the heist, leading to him and Jessica being inadvertently locked inside the vault. Jinx's phone call for help has prompted police, by Officer DeGepse, to surround the bank. Jinx makes contact with Simon by cell phone, and the situation becomes clearer, as he realizes that Jessica has access to a special inside-the-vault computer and its codes, meaning only she can open the vault door. Simon becomes increasingly upset when he is unable to induce Jinx to help open the vault (so the robbers can clear out the safe deposit boxes). And DeGepse is equally frustrated by the standoff, particularly as it is Jinx, not he, who seems to gain control over the situation.

As events progress, Jinx realizes that he and Jessica actually think very much alike, both feeling used; this new kinship leads them to plot an escape. A call comes in from Nick, the true mastermind of the robbery, and Jinx and Jessica realize that Nick needs them to issue a PIN for him to access funds which have been skimmed (from fees, of course) over the course of years. With Simon increasingly unstable, Jinx is able to manipulate both him and DeGepse while also making a deal with Nick to provide a PIN (controlled by Jinx and Jessica) to go with Nick’s account information. Jinx manages to talk the robbers into letting Jessica and him out, and then persuades the police they were hostages who had nothing to do with the robbery. In the ensuing confusion, they slip away to meet Nick and escape with their cut of the cash.

== Cast ==
- Nick Stahl as Jason Taylor, or Jinx, The Innocent Civilian.
- Erika Christensen as Jessica, The Hostage.
- Gavin Rossdale as Simon, The Leader of the Bank Robbers and the main antagonist of the film.
- Terry Crews as Officer DeGepse, in charge of the negotiations.
- Leo Fitzpatrick as Gunman, a henchman.
- Adriano Aragon as Officer Linstrom, DeGepse's partner.
- David Carradine as Nick, the mastermind and main villain of the film.

== Reception ==
On the review aggregator website Rotten Tomatoes, 33% of 15 critics' reviews are positive. Metacritic, which uses a weighted average, assigned the film a score of 27 out of 100, based on 5 critics, indicating "generally unfavorable" reviews.

Los Angeles Times critic Sam Adams felt the film had "lame dialogue," not saved by its brisk delivery. "Stahl’s character may gripe about being nickel and dimed, but “How to Rob a Bank” commits wholesale robbery of the 81 minutes it takes to watch." New York Daily News praised Stahl's performance, but deemed it a "flashy, ultimately empty heist flick."
