= La Corte de Familia =

- Created by: Mario Proenza; Enrique Vicencio; Sheldon Baer
- Presented by: Jose Luis Gonzalez (2000–2001); Patricia de Leon (2001–2003); Fidel Juarez Garcia (2003–2005)
- Starring: Judge; Cristina Pérez; Bailiffs; Alexa Tejeda (2000–2003); Michael Riggins (2003–2005)
- Narrated by: Cesar Ramirez
- Theme music composer: Pierre Garreaud
- Country of origin: United States
- No. of seasons: 5

Production
- Executive producer: Mario Proenza
- Running time: 30 minutes
- Production company: Auckland Entertainment

Original release
- Network: Telemundo
- Release: 2000 – 2005

Related
- La Corte del Pueblo; Cristina's Court

La Corte de Familia (translated Family Court) is a Spanish-language reality court show that aired on Telemundo from 2000 to 2005. The show was presided over by judge Cristina Pérez. The show is a spin-off (and sister show) of La Corte del Pueblo.
