= Karate Kid: Legends =

2025 film by Jonathan Entwistle

- Theatrical release poster
- Directed by: Jonathan Entwistle
- Written by: Rob Lieber
- Based on: The Karate Kid by Robert Mark Kamen
- Produced by: Karen Rosenfelt
- Starring: Jackie Chan; Ben Wang; Joshua Jackson; Sadie Stanley; Ming-Na Wen; Wyatt Oleff; Aramis Knight; Ralph Macchio
- Cinematography: Justin Brown
- Edited by: Dana E. Glauberman; Colby Parker Jr
- Music by: Dominic Lewis
- Production companies: Columbia Pictures; Sunswept Entertainment
- Distributed by: Sony Pictures Releasing
- Release dates: May 7, 2025 (Cinépolis Mitikah); May 30, 2025 (United States)
- Running time: 94 minutes
- Country: United States
- Language: English
- Budget: $45 million
- Box office: $117 million

Karate Kid: Legends is a 2025 American martial arts drama film starring Jackie Chan and Ralph Macchio, while starring Ben Wang as the main lead. It is the sixth film in The Karate Kid franchise, serving as a follow-up to The Karate Kid (2010) and the television series Cobra Kai (2018–2025). Both Chan and Macchio reprise their roles from the franchise. The story follows Li (Wang), a kung fu prodigy who, after moving to New York and confronting a local karate champion, receives help from his former master Mr. Han (Chan) and karate sensei Daniel LaRusso (Macchio). It is the first film in the series not to be produced by Jerry Weintraub, who died in 2015.

The film was confirmed to be in development in September 2022, with Jonathan Entwistle set to direct and Rob Lieber set to write the screenplay in November 2023. Casting took place from November 2023 to April 2024. Principal photography took place from April to June 2024.

Karate Kid: Legends premiered at the Cinépolis Mitikah in Mexico City, Mexico on May 7, 2025, and was released in the United States by Sony Pictures Releasing on May 30. It received mixed reviews from critics and grossed $117 million worldwide.

== Plot ==
In the summer of 1985, (Note: During the events of The Karate Kid Part II (1986); erroneously labeled as "1986" in film.) Mr. Miyagi tells then-adolescent Daniel LaRusso about the origins of Miyagi family karate and the relationship between the Miyagi and Han families. Mr. Miyagi's 17th-century ancestor, Shimpo Miyagi, ended up in China while fishing off the coast of Japan. The Han family took him in and taught him kung fu, which he used to develop Miyagi family karate upon his return to Okinawa.

In 2023, Mr. Han is the revered shifu, master of a wuguan, kung fu school in Beijing. Among his students is his great-nephew, Li Fong. Li's mother is a doctor, who arrives to tell Li and Mr. Han that she has accepted a job in New York City and makes Li promise to stop practicing martial arts when Li's brother, Bo, was stabbed to death by a vengeful defeated opponent after a tournament a year prior.

In New York, Li struggles to adjust at school and meets Mia Lipani, the daughter of former local boxing champion, Victor Lipani, who now owns a pizza shop. As their friendship begins to grow, they are confronted by Mia's aggressive ex-boyfriend and a local karate champion, Conor Day. After Conor punches Li in the face, his mother hires a tutor, Alan, who becomes his best friend. Li later confronts Conor again at school, but he realizes that Conor is a more powerful fighter. Li tries a jumping, spinning kick called a "dragon kick", learned from Bo, but Conor counters and defeats him.

One night, Li witnesses Victor being attacked by thugs sent by his creditor, O'Shea, who owns the karate dojo where Conor trains. Forced to intervene, Li defeats the attackers. Victor decides to return to boxing to pay off his debt and save his pizzeria and asks Li to train him. Li is hesitant, but agrees after discussing it with Mr. Han over the phone and later becomes Victor's employee in the pizzeria. During Victor's comeback match, the opponent, following orders from O'Shea, knocks him out with illegal blows, sending Victor to the hospital. Li, who is paralyzed by memories of Bo's death, fails to step in to help at the hospital, earning Mia's disappointment. Li's mother, who works at the hospital, also expresses her disappointment in Li's continued involvement in martial arts.

Mr. Han arrives in New York to confront Li, who has avoided several of his phone calls. Upon learning the truth, Mr. Han encourages Li to return to martial arts to enter the upcoming Five Boroughs Tournament, both to help his friends and to confront his past. Han visits Los Angeles to ask Daniel for help. Despite initially refusing, Daniel joins them in New York. Meanwhile, Victor fully recovers from his injuries, and Mia and Li mend their relationship which has budded into a romance.

Li trains in both kung fu from Mr. Han and Miyagi-Do karate from Daniel. Alan lends Li his rooftop garden as his makeshift training ground. Mr. Han and Daniel develop a new variation of the dragon kick to lure the opponent into a counterattack, which Li can then dodge and reverse-counterattack.

Li begins fighting in the Five Boroughs Tournament and makes his way to the finals against Conor. O'Shea sends thugs to attack Li, but Mr. Han and Daniel defend him. Mr. Han also convinces Li's mother that martial arts are beneficial for Li, as they help him overcome his tragic past. Li and Conor face off in an intense eight-point match. Conor initially dominates the match, but through his resilience and with both Shifu Han and Sensei LaRusso in his corner, Li eventually turns the tide of the match and manages to tie with Conor. In the final round, Li executes his adapted dragon kick maneuver, winning the match and overcoming his fears. Conor retaliates with a sneak attack, but Li swiftly defeats him and shows him mercy, earning Conor's respect.

Later, Victor opens a second pizzeria location and Mr. Han returns to China. In Los Angeles, Daniel receives a frozen pizza delivery from Li with a note and picture inside as a thank-you gift, where he and Johnny Lawrence debate whether New York pizza is better than California pizza. Johnny pitches a new business idea; a dojo-themed pizzeria called Miyagi-Dough, much to Daniel's embarrassment.

== Cast ==
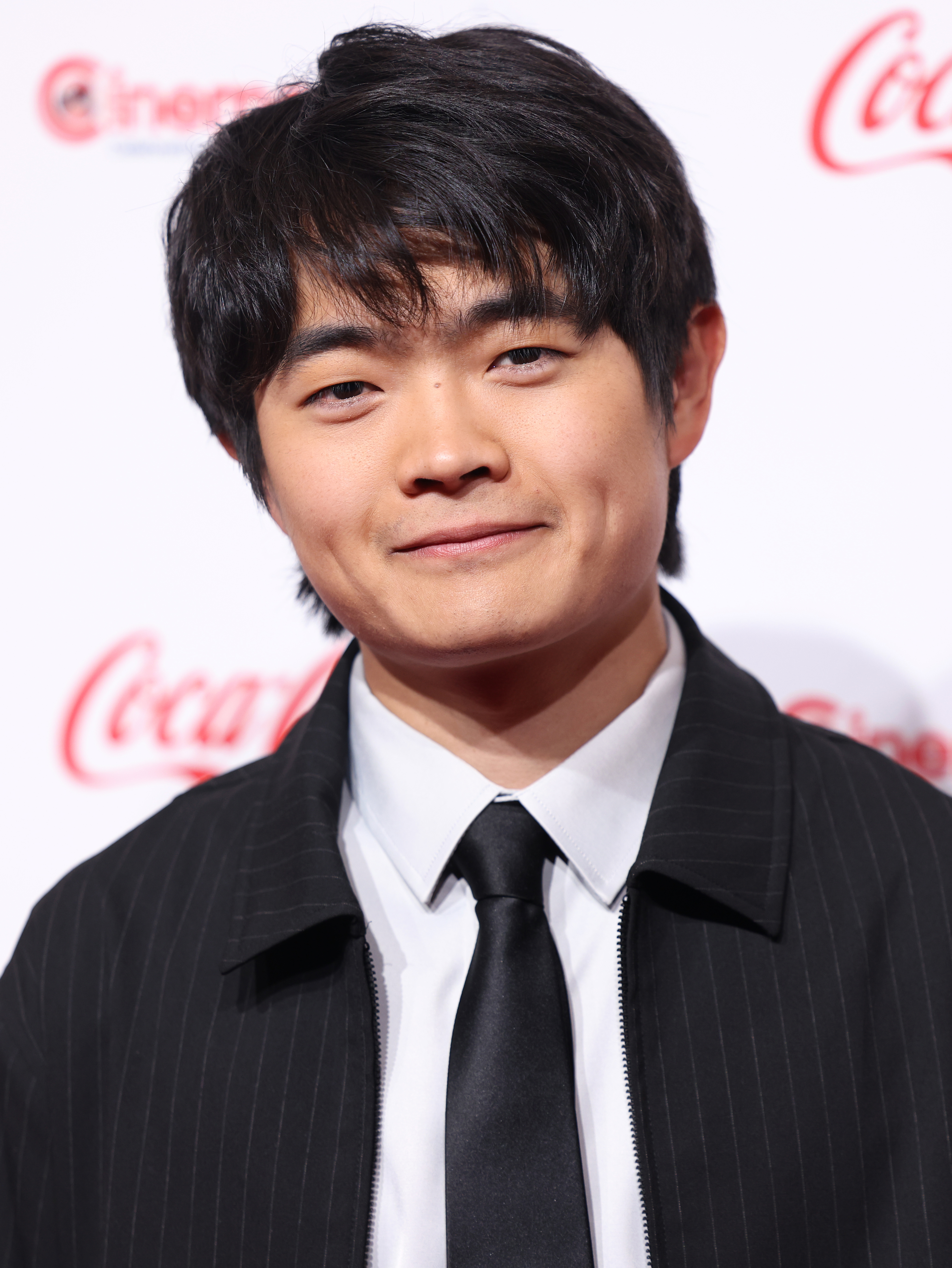
Ben Wang plays the main character, Li Fong.

- Jackie Chan as Mr. Han, a revered shifu of a wuguan in Beijing
- Ralph Macchio as Daniel LaRusso, a sensei of Miyagi-Do Karate in California
- Ben Wang as Li Fong, a young Chinese boy mentored by his great-uncle Mr. Han
  - Marco Zhang as a young Li Fong
- Joshua Jackson as Victor Lipani, Mia's father and former local boxing champion
- Sadie Stanley as Mia Lipani, Victor's daughter
- Ming-Na Wen as Dr. Fong, Li's mother and Mr. Han's niece
- Aramis Knight as Conor Day, a karate prodigy and Li's bully and rival
- Wyatt Oleff as Alan, Li's tutor and friend
- Shaunette Renée Wilson as Ms. Morgan, Li's schoolteacher in New York
- Tim Rozon as O'Shea, a loan shark who is Victor's creditor and Conor's sensei.
- Oscar Ge as Bo Fong, Li's deceased older brother, who was killed in a street fight prior to the beginning of the film.

Additionally, Pat Morita appears as Mr. Miyagi in archival footage from The Karate Kid Part II and William Zabka reprises his role as Johnny Lawrence from previous appearances in the franchise.

== Production ==
=== Background ===
The Karate Kid (1984), starring Ralph Macchio as Daniel LaRusso, was followed by two sequels: The Karate Kid Part II (1986), and The Karate Kid Part III (1989). The Karate Kid (2010), a remake of the first film, followed a similar storyline with a different set of characters, including Jackie Chan as Mr. Han. Macchio reprised his role in the television series Cobra Kai (2018–2025), which served as a sequel to the original films.

=== Development ===
A sequel to the 2010 film was announced shortly after its release with Jaden Smith, Taraji P. Henson, and Chan set to reprise their roles. Breck Eisner was tapped to direct in April 2014. By then, two drafts of the screenplay had been written by writing duo Ethan Reiff and Cyrus Voris as well as Zak Penn. Eisner left the project three months later and a new screenplay by Jeremiah Friedman and Nick Palmer was commissioned. In April 2017, Eisner returned to the project but by October, Chan expressed dissatisfaction with the film's script.

In September 2022, a new feature film was confirmed to be in development, being described as "the return of the original Karate Kid franchise". In November 2023, it was reported that Jonathan Entwistle was set to direct the film, with a screenplay written by Rob Lieber and with Karen Rosenfelt serving as the producer. Karate Kid: Legends features a storyline set three years after the events of Cobra Kai.

=== Casting ===
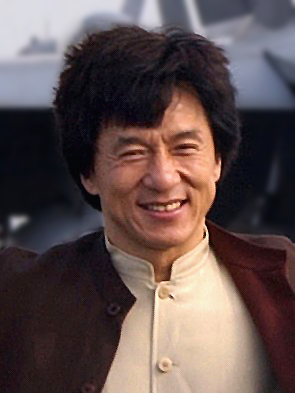
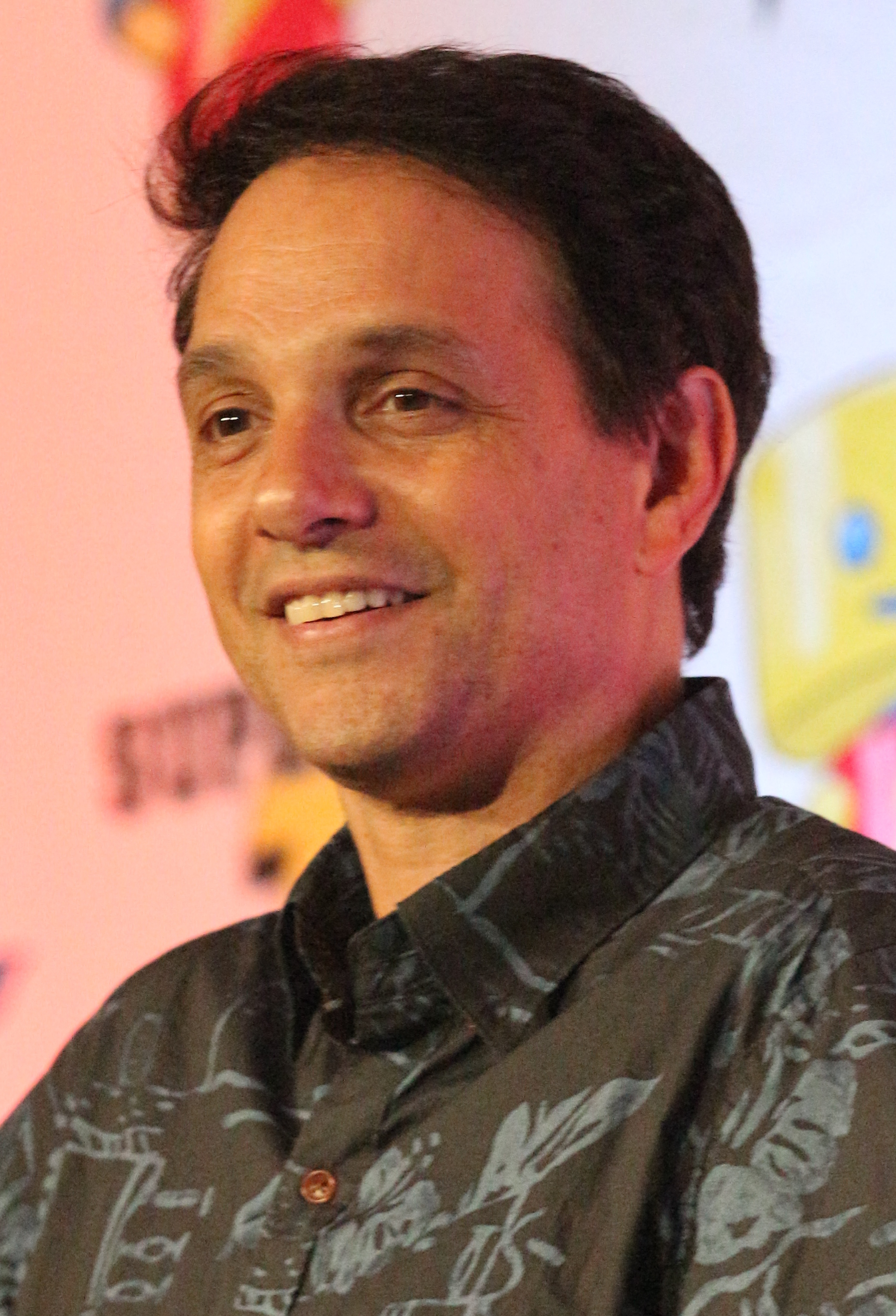
Jackie Chan and Ralph Macchio reprise their roles as Mr. Han and Daniel LaRusso respectively.

In August 2023, Chan was reported to be reprising his role in the film. In late November 2023, Chan and Macchio were officially cast. The announcement confirmed that the 2010 film shares the same universe from the original films and Cobra Kai. In addition, Chan and Macchio announced a world-wide open casting call for an actor to star as the film's iteration of the titular character, described as a Chinese teen who moves to the East Coast and begins studying martial arts.

In February 2024, Ben Wang was cast as the titular character, Li Fong. In March, Joshua Jackson, Sadie Stanley, and Ming-Na Wen were cast in undisclosed roles. In April, Aramis Knight and Wyatt Oleff joined the cast.

=== Filming ===
Principal photography began in Montreal on April 1, 2024, and wrapped filming on June 3. The film was shot under the working title Victory Boulevard.

== Music ==
Dominic Lewis was hired to compose the score by December 2024, becoming the fourth composer in the history of the franchise, following Bill Conti, who scored the first four films, James Horner, who scored the 2010 film, and Leo Birenberg and Zach Robinson who scored Cobra Kai. In addition to his score, Lewis also wrote and performs original songs for the film, as well as incorporating Conti's original themes from the first Karate Kid film.

== Release ==
Karate Kid: Legends premiered in Mexico City on May 8, 2025, and was released in the United States and Canada on May 30. The film was originally set to be released on June 7, 2024, but due to the 2023 SAG-AFTRA strike, it was delayed to December 13, 2024. It was moved once again to May 2025, with Kraven the Hunter taking over the release date, to avoid conflict with the final season of Cobra Kai. Sony Pictures Home Entertainment released Karate Kid: Legends for premium digital rental and purchase on July 8, 2025, followed by physical releases on DVD, Blu-ray, and Ultra HD Blu-ray formats on August 26, 2025. Under Sony's ongoing "Pay-1" window agreement, the film made its subscription streaming debut on Netflix on September 27, 2025.

== Reception ==
=== Box office ===
Karate Kid: Legends grossed $52.5 million in the United States and Canada, and $64.5 million in other territories, for a worldwide total of $117 million.

In the United States and Canada, Karate Kid: Legends was released alongside Bring Her Back, and was projected to gross $25–30 million from 3,809 theaters in its opening weekend. The film made $7.7 million on its first day, including $2.3 million from Thursday night previews. It went on to debut to $21 million, finishing third behind holdovers Lilo & Stitch and Mission: Impossible – The Final Reckoning. The slight underperformance was blamed on franchise fans becoming accustomed to the series being on Netflix after Cobra Kai, as well as Lilo & Stitch sharing the family demographic in theaters.

=== Critical response ===
On the review aggregator website Rotten Tomatoes, 57% of 198 critics' reviews are positive, with an average rating of 5.6/10. The website's consensus reads: "Leaning heavily on the nostalgic appeal of Jackie Chan and Ralph Macchio's return to the Karate Kid franchise, Legends could be more disciplined with its technique but still lands some crowd pleasing strikes." Metacritic, which uses a weighted average, assigned the film a score of 51 out of 100, based on 36 critics, indicating "mixed or average" reviews. Audiences polled by CinemaScore gave the film an average grade of "A-" on an A+ to F scale.
