= Thanks (TV series) =

1999 American TV series

- Created by: Phoef Sutton; Mark Legan
- Starring: Tim Dutton; Kirsten Nelson; Cloris Leachman; Jim Rash; Erika Christensen; Amy Centner; Andrew Ducote
- Composer: Randy Hale
- Country of origin: United States
- Original language: English
- No. of seasons: 1
- No. of episodes: 6

Production
- Executive producers: Phoef Sutton; Mark Legan
- Running time: 30 minutes
- Production companies: Mauretania Productions; Touchstone Television

Original release
- Network: CBS
- Release: August 2 – September 6, 1999

Thanks is an American television sitcom that debuted on CBS on August 2, 1999, and ran for six episodes from 8:30 to 9:00pm ET on Monday nights until September 6, 1999. The program explores the trials and tribulations of the Winthrops, a 17th-century Puritan family, in Plymouth, Massachusetts. Characters take their names from John Winthrop, the famed governor of the original Bostonian Puritan community, and John Cotton, another prominent Puritan religious leader.

== Cast ==
- Tim Dutton as James Winthrop
- Kirsten Nelson as Polly Winthrop, the wife of James
- Jim Rash as John Cotton
- Erika Christensen as Abigail Winthrop, the first daughter of James & Polly
- Amy Centner as Elizabeth Winthrop, the second daughter of James & Polly
- Andrew Ducote as William Winthrop, the son of James & Polly
- Cloris Leachman as Grammy Winthrop, the mother of James
- Robert Machray as Magistrate

== Episodes ==
No.	Title	Directed by	Written by	Original release date
1	"Pilot"	Andrew D. Weyman	Phoef Sutton & Mark Legan	August 2, 1999
The Puritans must decide whether to stay in America or go back to England.
2	"Tobacco"	Andrew D. Weyman	Phoef Sutton & Mark Legan	August 9, 1999
The townspeople become addicted to tobacco.
3	"Privacy"	Andrew D. Weyman	Phoef Sutton & Mark Legan	August 16, 1999
The Winthrops build on a new room for Grammy.
4	"Marriage"	Brian K. Roberts	Phoef Sutton & Mark Legan	August 23, 1999
Cotton's mail-order bride arrives.
5	"Spring"	Jay Sandrich	Phoef Sutton & Mark Legan	August 30, 1999
Grammy falls in love with a cad.
6	"Thanksgiving"	Jay Sandrich	Phoef Sutton & Mark Legan	September 6, 1999
The Winthrops prepare for the Thanksgiving with the help of Squanto.
