= The Guard (TV series) =

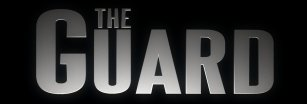
- Genre: Drama
- Starring: Steve Bacic; Jeremy Guilbaut; Zoie Palmer; Sonya Salomaa; David James Elliott
- Country of origin: Canada
- Original language: English
- No. of seasons: 3
- No. of episodes: 22

Production
- Executive producers: Charles Bishop; Stephen Hegyes; Raymond Storey; Shawn Williamson
- Running time: 60 minutes (including commercials)
- Production company: Halifax Film

Original release
- Network: Global
- Release: January 22, 2008 – July 6, 2009

The Guard is a Canadian drama television series portraying the life of the Canadian Coast Guard along the British Columbia Coast. Filming takes place in Squamish, British Columbia with Howe Sound standing in for the fictional Port Hallet and a real 14.6 m Coast Guard lifeboat Cape St. James has been renamed Cape Pacific for the series.

The show primarily revolves around the four main characters: Miro Da Silva (Steve Bacic), Laura Nelson (Claudette Mink - Season 1; Sonya Salomaa - Seasons 2 and 3), Andrew Vanderlee (Jeremy Guilbaut), and Carly Greig (Zoie Palmer). There is also a strong supporting cast, including Gordon Michael Woolvett (as Barry Winter), who worked with Bacic previously on Andromeda, Julie Patzwald, and Eve Harlow, the latter two of whom won a 2008 and 2009 Leo Award, respectively, for their roles on the show.

The show focuses on both the professional and personal lives of the lead characters, confronting issues such as addiction, post traumatic stress disorder, and family problems.

It was picked up by Ion premiering March 13, 2010. By late April, it was put on hiatus on the basis that it "did not find a broad enough audience on the network", explained a spokesperson. It subsequently aired for a period on the ION Life digital channel.

== Episodes ==
While there is agreement that 22 episodes of The Guard have been produced, the organization into seasons has provided some controversy. Originally, Halifax Film announced a first season consisting of 7 episodes. Halifax announced on October 9, 2008 that season 2 would consist of 15 episodes beginning on 29 October 2008. In the final press kit, it states, "The Guard returns with a new season of 15 one-hour episodes on October 29 in its new timeslot Wednesday at 10 PM on Global TV." However, in this same press kit (edited after the series was completed), Halifax Film opts to relabel the episodes for marketing purposes in other markets so that season 1 consists of 13 episodes, while season 2 consists of 9 episodes.

Many television viewers, however, regard the most appropriate organization to consist of three seasons. The first season consisting of 7 episodes was shown in the period 22 January 2008 to 4 March 2008. This was followed by a hiatus of 7.5 months where no new programs were shown. The second season consisted of 7 episodes in the period 29 October 2008 to 10 December 2008. Again, there was a hiatus, this time for over five months, until a third season, consisting of 8 episodes, was shown in the period 18 May 2009 to 6 July 2009. No further new episodes were shown after this date.

=== Season 1 (2008) ===
No. overall	No. in season	Title	Directed by	Written by	Original release date
1	1	"Waheguru"	Ernie Barbarash	Raymond Storey	January 22, 2008
When a car carrying a Sikh family plunges into the river, the rescue throws the Port Hallet Coast Guard into the eye of an emotional storm. Rescue swimmer Andrew Vanderlee tries to cope with post-traumatic stress, as he relives unsettling moments of the tragedy. After a night of drinking, Carly Greig, a rescue specialist who grew up on a fish boat, meets a free-spirited, recovering addict named Wendell. Newly promoted Captain Miro Da Silva, seeks comfort through online sex, throwing him into the financial mess of a credit card scam. And First Mate Laura Nelson struggles to cope with her boyfriend David’s declining health and her resentment of Miro, who won the Captaincy that’s rightfully hers.
2	2	"Live Free"	Lynne Stopkewich	Raymond Storey	January 29, 2008
A routine lifeboat drill on a Greek freighter turns into a struggle of life and death, when a cable snaps, trapping a young crewman in an underwater air pocket. Haunted by a previous recovery, Andrew sees visions of Dharma, the dead Sikh woman as he attempts to rescue the trapped man. Carly considers selling her Dad’s fishing boat, which forces her to confront the ghosts of her childhood—the poor kid from the docks. Miro challenges his “body-conscious baggage” when during a fire fighting mission he meets Gwen, the sensual owner of an “all-ages, clothing optional family compound.”
3	3	"Coming Through Fog"	Lynne Stopkewich	Raymond Storey	February 5, 2008
The Coast Guard crew learns about the resiliency of love, when a sailboat gets caught on high seas in a storm. David pushes Laura to consider custody of Tina, when it’s clear he’s losing his battle with progressive MS. After a visit to his Father in the nursing home, Miro is haunted by memories of Miro Senior’s infidelity. Andrew’s marriage suffers as he falls deeper into a debilitating depression and Carly comes close to losing Wendell when she pushes him away in embarrassment.
4	4	"When I'm Sixty Four"	Ernie Barbarash	Raymond Storey	February 12, 2008
Carly gets her back up when Canadian Forces Search & Rescue Technicians (SAR Techs) aggressively move in on the rescue of an elderly couple in a sinking cabin cruiser. Laura attempts a team building dinner party that’s a bust before it even starts. Carly discloses her troubled childhood to Wendell, and drunk again, ends up in a meaningless sexual encounter with the aggressive SAR Tech. Despite his efforts to tame his emotional ghosts, Andrew’s nightmares escalate and he quits counselling. When Miro’s commitment-phobia throws him into relationship troubles with Gwen, he picks up a teenage flag girl to bring to Laura’s party.
5	5	"When All Else Fails"	Ernie Barbarash	Peter Smith	February 19, 2008
When a drug addicted woman is tossed overboard, Carly insists the crew keep searching for her, after she’s been in the water long past survival time. Sliding into financial ruin, Miro’s truck is repossessed and Gwen encourages him to moonlight as a handyman. Afraid of intimacy, Carly tries to sabotage her relationship with Wendell by confessing she had sex with another guy. Tina skips curfew, forcing Laura to leave the base during shift. Still caught in the back draft of post traumatic stress, Andrew loses his temper with Amy, who kicks him out of the house.
6	6	"Just Say No"	Kristoffer Tabori	James Taylor Phillips	February 26, 2008
A rescue becomes personal for Laura when she is called upon to save the life of Jen, an undercover cop, who is Tina’s biological mother. With tequila as incentive, Andrew and Carly study for the upcoming base inspection and accidentally share a passionate kiss. While attempting to repair Laura’s backyard shed, Miro enlists Tina’s help and ends up being a positive influence.
7	7	"The Beacon"	Anthony Atkins	Abigail Kinch	March 4, 2008
When a retired lighthouse keeper with Alzheimer’s goes missing, it stirs up Carly’s guilt for abandoning her father. Ursula finds Tina in a compromising position in Miro’s hotel room and gives Miro the boot, landing him in Laura’s guest house. Carly finds Wendell camping out, about to revert to drugs.

=== Season 2 (2008) ===
No. overall	No. in season	Title	Directed by	Written by	Original release date
8	1	"The Hold"	Anthony Atkins	Michael MacLennan	October 29, 2008
Miro breaks the rules when he takes the MLB on a chase of a battered trawler that may have guns aboard and the crew ends up rescuing the victims of a human trafficking operation. Meanwhile, Andrew’s marriage is threatened when he comes clean to Amy about kissing Carly.
9	2	"Zero Footprint"	Anthony Atkins	Story by : Raymond Storey & Aren X. Tulchinsky; Teleplay by : Abigail Kinch	November 5, 2008
The crew is called out on an emotionally complicated medical emergency when Ira, an environmentalist hippie living on remote Zetus Island produces a DNR order for his brother, Daniel, who has gone into cardiac arrest. Ira insists Laura not administer any medical intervention, even though, without help, Daniel will die. Carly’s relationship with Wendell becomes strained when Robyn, a woman from his past, shows up in Port Hallet.
10	3	"Sounds of Loneliness"	Peter DeLuise	Peter Smith & Raymond Storey	November 12, 2008
The symptoms of Post Traumatic Stress reach a fevered pitch for Andrew. Isha, the sister of the woman he tried to rescue from the submerged car, begs Andrew to help her prove that her sister and nephews were murdered by her brother-in-law. Robyn blackmails Wendell into giving her his life savings of seven hundred dollars and she leaves for good. Gwen has big news for Miro.
11	4	"Fight or Flight"	Peter DeLuise	James Taylor Phillips	November 19, 2008
The crew’s attempts to save the lives of the passengers of a downed float plane are frustrated when a new OIC blows out the MLB’s propeller and SAR Tech Helicopters are hours away. After a few beers to unwind from a very hard day, Miro and Laura have sex – with each other.
12	5	"Wake"	Anthony Atkins	Peter Smith	November 26, 2008
Carly’s mental health day turns into a rescue mission when she discovers a missing injured boy on a remote island, but her attempts to save him are slowed as she fights the effects of a head injury.
13	6	"The Big Day"	Anthony Atkins	Raymond Storey	December 3, 2008
The arrival of Port Hallet’s new OIC, Jim McGregor catches the crew off guard. Laura is a beautiful bride but, when she runs out of her own wedding to save a fisherman on a burning boat, David is left with a difficult decision. Meanwhile, Wendell runs from the law and steals a boat.
14	7	"Fistful of Rain"	John L'Ecuyer	Peter Mitchell	December 10, 2008
Tension mounts in Port Hallet as the local commercial fishermen are shut out by moratorium that excludes First Nations fishing. Carly, a fisherman's daughter, sympathizes with the locals but finds herself forced to turn against them when they attempt to sink a native fishing boat. Meanwhile, a fresh crop of summer cadets from Coast Guard College arrive at the base ready to compete for positions on the MLB.

=== Season 3 (2009) ===
No. overall	No. in season	Title	Directed by	Written by	Original release date
15	1	"Body Parts"	John L'Ecuyer	Daegan Fryklind	May 18, 2009
Port Hallet is a buzz when an internet porn director shows up with three "actresses" to shoot a Girls Gone into the Wild video. Their filming is interrupted when their boat hits a deadhead and the Coasties are forced to race to their rescue. Meanwhile, Laura is thrown for a curve when David's ex-wife Jen arrives to investigate a dismembered sneaker-clad foot that washed up on the beach…and then hooks up with Miro.
16	2	"He is Heavy, He's My Brother"	Scott Smith	Peter Mitchell	May 25, 2009
Andrew begrudgingly agrees to go on a fishing trip with his brother to "celebrate" his recent divorce. When alcohol, a gas barbecue and his brother’s rowdy friends mix, the boat explodes. Miles from shore, Andrew begins a marathon swim with his severely injured brother, while the rest of the crew begin a frantic search for their missing cohort. Meanwhile, Carly is shocked to discover that her estranged mother lived in nearby Port Marlow.
17	3	"Last Night"	Scott Smith	Peter Smith	June 1, 2009
Laura finds herself bonding with Caitlin Fanney, an eccentric conspiracy theorist who lives alone on an isolated island. Miro doesn’t believe that the woman, who makes wild claims about people trying to run her off her land, is stable enough to live on her own. Laura disagrees and ends up spending the night on the island to see for herself, and when strange things start to happen, she realizes that maybe Caitlin isn’t crazy after all. Meanwhile, Steffi gets a chance to prove herself when she and Carly attempt to foil a pair of dynamite fishermen.
18	4	"Boom"	Stacey Curtis	James Taylor Phillips	June 8, 2009
A fisherman excitedly reels in what's sure to be his prize-winning salmon, only to realize he's snagged a human leg, a discovery which brings Jen (David’s ex-wife) back to town. Meanwhile, Tina’s initially thrilled when she’s asked to join some older kids at an island party, but things quickly turn serious when one of the drunken partiers tries to force himself on her, causing their speeding boat to slam into a log boom.
19	5	"Lovesick"	Stacey Curtis	Peter Mitchell	June 15, 2009
The MLB responds to what seems like a routine call, only to discover that all of the occupants on the boat are sick. When one of the passengers dies from a mysterious illness, medical officers quarantine the crew and passengers in the Coast Guard base. Tensions mount as our Coasties deal with what seems to be a deadly virus.
20	6	"Out of the Woods"	Jason Furukawa	James Taylor Phillips	June 22, 2009
A family vacation goes terribly wrong when a cliff ledge breaks, sending the hikers plummeting into a ravine. The Port Hallet Coasties respond, but quickly realize they’re trapped themselves and all they can do is keep this family alive as they wait for an airlift. Meanwhile, Carly is shocked when Wendell returns unannounced to Port Hallet after being released from Military Prison. Wendell assumes things will go back to the way they were before he left, but Carly isn’t so sure.
21	7	"At Sea"	Anne Wheeler	Peter Smith	June 29, 2009
Miro finds himself second-guessing his abilities as a Captain when he hesitates while responding to a sinking fishing boat. Laura meanwhile goes on the defensive when the MLB breaks down during the rescue. Although initially invigorated after being able to bring a young fisherman back to life, Rob begins to regret his actions when he realizes the boy is brain dead.
22	8	"Full Circle"	Anne Wheeler	Raymond Storey	July 6, 2009
Rob shocks and disappoints the crew when he proclaims that he’s leaving the Coast Guard. Meanwhile, the Coasties find themselves questioning what to do after Laura hits a woman with the MLB during a daring rescue. To make matters worse, it looks like a rescue is going to force Miro to go back on a promise, and miss the birth of his son.
