= All at Once (2016 film) =

- Film poster
- Directed by: Jon Abrahams
- Written by: Michael Testone
- Produced by: Michael Testone; Matthew Quinn; Jon Abrahams
- Starring: Jon Abrahams; Annie Potts; Erika Christensen; Lydia Hearst; Summer Phoenix; Mickey Sumner; Martin Donovan; Stephen Henderson; Nicole Elizabeth Berger
- Cinematography: Matthew Quinn
- Edited by: Aaron Yanes
- Music by: Alberto Boff
- Production company: Virtuoso Films
- Distributed by: Virtuoso Films
- Release dates: November 9, 2016 (Napa Valley Film Festival); April 6, 2018 (United States)
- Running time: 112 minutes
- Country: United States
- Language: English
- Budget: $1.5 million

All at Once is an American drama film, directed by and starring Jon Abrahams. The film, written by Michael Testone, also stars Annie Potts, Erika Christensen, Lydia Hearst, Summer Phoenix, Mickey Sumner, Martin Donovan, and Stephen Henderson.

The film had its world premiere at the Napa Valley Film Festival on November 9, 2016.

== Premise ==
A young artist in New York City accepts guardianship of his two best friends' young daughters after their parents perish in the September 11 attacks. Eleven years later, he moves back to his hometown of Buffalo, New York to raise the two girls after suffering from the financial strains of living in the City.

== Cast ==
- Jon Abrahams as James Maxwell
- Annie Potts as Ginny Maxwell
- Erika Christensen as Tiffany Fontinella
- Scott Caan as Alexander Clarke
- Lydia Hearst as Amy
- Summer Phoenix as Samantha
- Mickey Sumner as Bridget
- Martin Donovan as Giovanni Sacco
- Stephen Henderson as Robert
- Liza Colón-Zayas as Linda Ramirez
- Mia Serafino as Beth Clarke
- Sasha Frolova as Alexis Clarke
- Nicole Elizabeth Berger as Grace Clarke
- Christian George as Lou Fontanelle
- Antoine Lanier as Norman
- Diane Gnagnarelli as Joanie

== Production ==
Principal photography began on July 27, 2015, in Manhattan. Filming moved to Buffalo, New York on August 1, 2015. Production was announced at a press conference featuring an appearance from Buffalo's mayor, Byron Brown, alongside a representative of the Buffalo Niagara Film Office and members of the cast and crew (including Jon Abrahams, Erika Christensen, and the director of photography Matthew Quinn).

== Release and reception ==
The film had its world premiere at the Napa Valley Film Festival on November 9, 2016. It was released in the United States on April 6, 2018.
