= Centurion: The Dancing Stallion =

- Directed by: Dana Gonzales
- Written by: Boon Collins
- Produced by: Dana Gonzales; Boon Collins; Randolf Turrow; David Tanner
- Starring: Amber Midthunder; Aramis Knight; Patricia de Leon; Sal Lopez; Billy Zane
- Distributed by: Lionsgate
- Release date: April 25, 2023
- Running time: 98 minutes
- Country: United States
- Language: English

Centurion: The Dancing Stallion is a 2023 American drama film written by Boon Collins, directed by Dana Gonzales and starring Amber Midthunder, Aramis Knight, Patricia de Leon, Sal Lopez and Billy Zane, who served as co-executive producer. Rob Schneider served as an executive producer of the film.

== Cast ==
- Aramis Knight as Danny Sanchez
- Amber Midthunder as Ellissia Hall
- Patricia de Leon as Isabella Hall
- Adam Irigoyen as Francisco
- Billy Zane as Jeffrey Hall
- Sal Lopez as Jorge Rodriguez
- Michael Cimino as Miguel

== Production ==
In May 2019, it was announced that Midthunder was cast as the lead. In June 2019, it was announced that De Leon was cast in the film.

== Release ==
The film was released on demand and digital on April 25, 2023.

== Reception ==
Jennifer Borget of Common Sense Media awarded the film four stars out of five.

Natalia Winkelman of The New York Times gave the film a negative review: "...any challenging questions are pushed aside in favor of third-act mechanics."
