= Jeremy Guilbaut =

Canadian actor (born 1980)

- Born: June 2, 1980 (age 45); Vancouver, British Columbia, Canada
- Occupation: Actor
- Years active: 1997–present

Jeremy Guilbaut (born 2 June 1980) is a Canadian actor. He most recently appeared in the television series The Guard and also appeared in Edgemont. His other credits include Battlestar Galactica and Millennium. He is often seen in movies associated with the Hallmark Channel and its subsidiary Hallmark Movies & Mysteries Channel and was recently seen in the 2019 movie The Last Bridesmaid.

== Filmography ==
=== Film ===
Year	Title	Role
2000	Air Bud 3	Steve Stearns
2005	Two for the Money	Mitch
2013	The Bouquet	Noah
2016	My boyfriends' dogs	Eric
2018	What Keeps You Alive	Executive Producer
2019	Z (Post-Production)	Executive Producer

=== Television ===
Year	Title	Role	Notes
1997	Perfect Body	Guy in Hallway	Television Film
1997	Breaker High	Alvin Shpeer	2 episodes; Guest role (Season 1)
1998	Millennium	Brant Carmody	Episode 3.3: 'TEOTWAWKI'
1999	Hayley Wagner, Star	Peyton	Television Film
2000	The Adventures of Shirley Holmes	Maurice	Episode 4.7: 'The Case of the Perfect Boyfriend'
2000	Higher Ground	Unknown	Episode 1.14: 'The Kids Stay in the Picture'
2000-2001	Daring & Grace: Teen Detectives	Dick Daring Jr	13 episodes; Main role (Season 1)
2001	Seven Days	Steve	Episode 3.17: 'Kansas'
2001	The Outer Limits	Brent Kearns	Episode 7.18: 'Lion's Den'
2001	The Miracle of the Cards	Steve Shergold	Television Film
2001-2005	Edgemont	Derek MacMahon	18 episodes; Recurring role (Seasons 2–5)
2002	Breaking News	Ski Instructor	Unknown
2002	Snow Queen	Kai	Television Film
2005	Tru Calling	Hank	Episode 2.1: 'The Perfect Storm'
2005	Battlestar Galactica	Lt. Joe 'Hammerhead' Palladino	2 episodes; Guest role (Season 2)
2006	Merlin's Apprentice	William	2 episodes; Mini Series
2007	The Party Never Stops: Diary of a Binge Drinker	Grad Student	Television Film
2008-2009	The Guard	Andrew Vanderlee	22 episodes; Main role (Seasons 1–3)
2009	Private Practice	Dan	Episode 3.7: 'The Hard Part'
2011	Fringe	Agent Warrick	2 episodes; Guest role (Seasons 3–4)
2012	The L.A. Complex	Mark	5 episodes; Recurring role (Season 2)
2013	Whisper of Fear	Sean	Television Film
2013-2015	Blackstone	Syd Samuels	4 episodes; Guest role (Seasons 3–5)
2014	The Good Mist	Sheriff Grady Williams	Television Film
2014	A Ring by Spring	Dave	Hallmark Channel Television Film
2014	My Boyfriends' Dogs	Eric	Hallmark Channel Television Film
2015	The Unauthorized Beverly Hills, 90210 Story	Will	Television Film
2015	The Christmas Note	Jason	Hallmark Movies & Mysteries Channel Television Film
2015	The Whispers	Mr. Brewster	2 episodes; Guest role (Season 1)
2016	All Things Valentine	Kit	Hallmark Channel Television Film
2016	Sandra Brown's White Hot	Chris Hoyle	Television Film
2016	Autumn in the Vineyard	Jonah Baldwin	Hallmark Channel Television Film
2017	Dead Over Heels: An Aurora Teagarden Mystery	Tim Prentiss	Hallmark Movies & Mysteries Channel Television Film
2017	When Calls the Heart	Ray Wyatt	8 episodes; Recurring role (Season 4)
2017	Destination Wedding	Grey Mount	Hallmark Channel Television Film
2017	Summer in the Vineyard	Jonah Baldwin	Hallmark Channel Television Film
2017	A Harvest Wedding	Payton Ellis	Hallmark Channel Television Film
2018	Jingle Around the Clock	Jay	Hallmark Channel Television Film
2019	The Last Bridesmaid	Aiden	Hallmark Channel Television Film
2020	The Christmas Waltz	David	Hallmark Channel Television Film
