= Runt (2020 film) =

- Theatrical release poster
- Directed by: William Coakley
- Written by: William Coakley; Armand Constantine; Christian van Gregg
- Produced by: Carl Rumbaugh; Gregory Thomas
- Starring: Cameron Boyce; Nicole Elizabeth Berger; Aramis Knight; Jason Patric; Cyrus Arnold; Carson Boatman; Javier Bolanos; Tichina Arnold; Brianna Hildebrand
- Cinematography: John T. Connor
- Edited by: Richard Byard
- Music by: James Curd
- Production companies: Calvin Productions; Infinite Contrast; Wagging Tail Productions
- Distributed by: 1091 Media
- Release dates: February 29, 2020 (Mammoth Film Festival); October 1, 2021 (United States)
- Running time: 97 minutes
- Country: United States
- Language: English

Runt is a 2020 American drama thriller film directed by William Coakley from a screenplay by Coakley, Armand Constantine, and Christian van Gregg. It stars Cameron Boyce in his final film role, alongside Nicole Elizabeth Berger, Aramis Knight, Jason Patric, Cyrus Arnold, Tichina Arnold, Brianna Hildebrand and Aydin Etehadi.

== Plot ==
Runt follows the life of Cal (Boyce), a teenage boy from a poor family who is looking to graduate and go to college. Cal is in his senior year of high school and is interested in the quarterback Vic's girlfriend Gabriella (Hildebrand). Throughout the film, Vic wastes no opportunity to threaten and beat up Cal.

Cal learns he is being courted by UCLA for a scholarship and dedicates himself to his study. Runt, Cal's dog, is Cal's only friend, as the teenager lives a lonely life. His only human ally is another teenager called Cecily; she asks Cal out a few times but is rebuffed due to Cal's interest in Gabriella.

During a test, some members of the football team try and cheat off Cal's paper, but he prevents them from doing so. The teacher, suspecting something is up, confronts Cal, but he denies any cheating was going on. Vic and the team, fearing they could be prevented from playing, confront Cal and threaten him, demanding that he own up and take the blame. This is seen by a janitor, and Vic and Cal are sent to the principal's office. Vic blames Cal for stalking his girlfriend and shows the principal a drawing Cal had of Gabriella that Cal had earlier dropped into Gabriella's bag. All suspicions of Vic are removed, and Cal denies that Vic and the team did anything to him.

Finally realizing that he may have a connection with Cecily, Cal agrees to meet her at the library. He rides her home on his bicycle, and they quickly bond. Later during a study group meeting, Gabriella invites him to a party, and Cal attends with Cecily. When they head outside, Vic takes the chance to confront them, beats up Cal, and sexually assaults Cecily. Cecily escapes and flees home. The next day, angered at what Vic has done to Cecily, Cal destroys Vic's prized car.

Cecily tells Cal she never reported Vic, as her father was recently paroled and she feared he would do something to get himself sent back to prison. As Cal leaves, he is hunted relentlessly by Vic but manages to evade him. Later, Cal has a fight in the school parking lot and manages to defeat Vic's goons. He is lauded by some other kids, who invite him to come to the beach with them. Cal forms a blossoming friendship with Ronnie, who invites him to bowling. While hanging out, Ronnie tells Cal that his dad sprayed his drugs with some cleaning fluid, sending him on a bad trip.

When Cal returns home, he sees Cecily waiting for him. She asks about the origins of Runt, and Cal explains how he adopted Runt when he found him as a stray. They watch a movie, and when they wake up, Cecily spots Cal's artwork. She compliments his talent, and he in turn informs her that he has been declined by the University of Rhode Island but seems unperturbed. They embrace, and she departs. As she leaves, Cal goes in search of Runt and finds the dog's corpse dumped in a bin at the rear of his house. Cal is devastated.

The following day at school, Vic takes the chance to mock Cal and mimic Runt's whine, indicating that he killed Cal's dog. Cal decides to get revenge on Vic and remembers Ronnie's tale from earlier. During the big game he sneaks into the football team's dressing room. He opens the team members' lockers and spikes their drugs with cleaning fluid. It is revealed that Vic and his friends have been doping to gain an advantage in games. Vic, however, isn't playing due to injuring his hand in his fight with Cal. The game starts badly for Vic's team, and at half time, Vic's friends take their drugs and begin to have ill-effects. Help is called, and they are all taken away.

Cal goes after Vic, and they fight. Vic manages to disarm Cal when Cal's one-time friend Borgie intervenes and fires his dad's pistol in the air. Cal takes the gun, but just before he is about to shoot Vic, Cecily intervenes and talks Cal out of it. She takes the gun away and gives him the bat. Cal angrily beats Vic with the bat. Shortly after, Cal and Cecily dispose of the bat and the pistol and walk away to a homecoming party as police sirens wail behind them.

== Cast ==
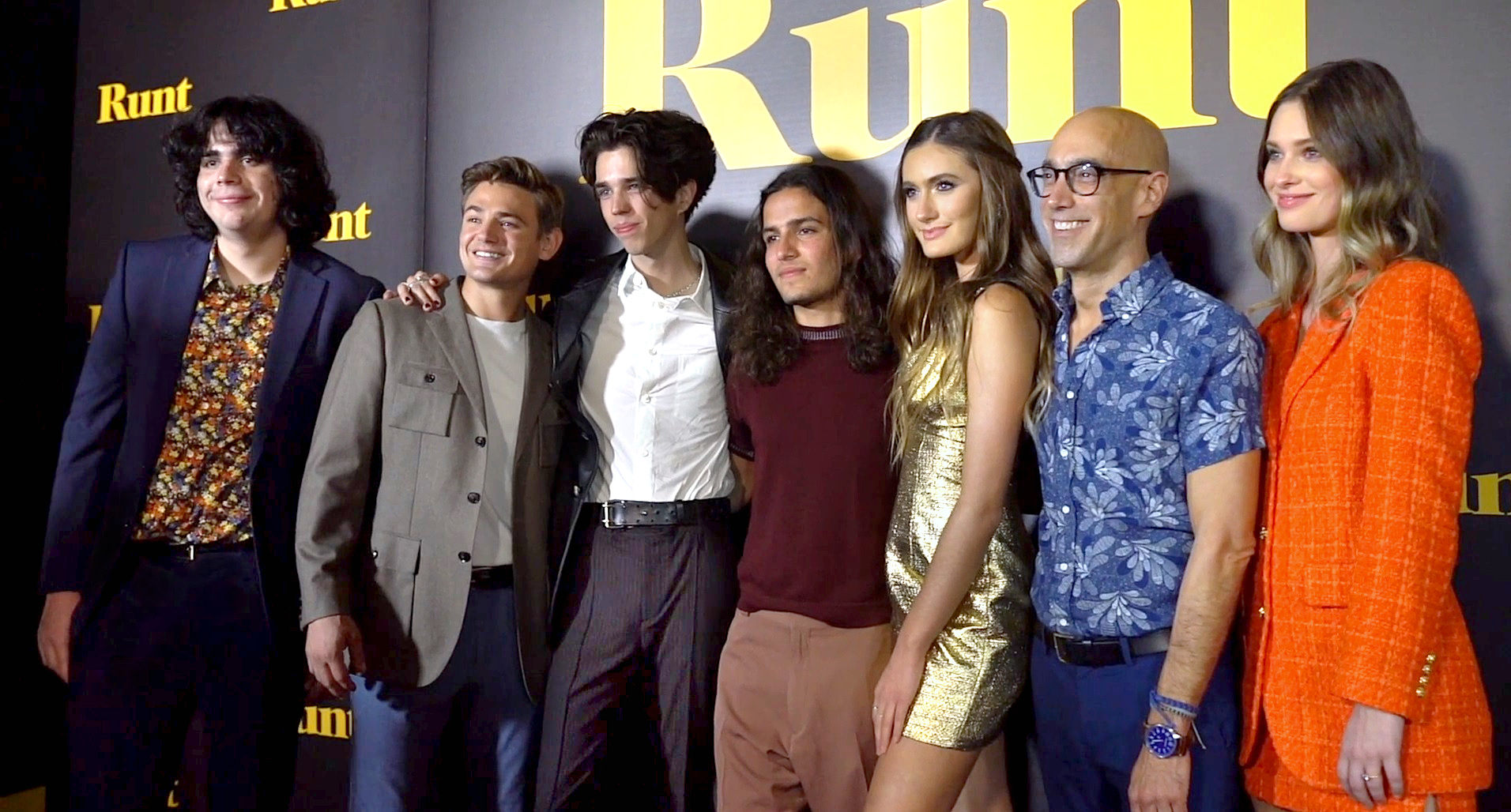
Cast of Runt

- Cameron Boyce as Cal
- Nicole Elizabeth Berger as Cecily
- Aramis Knight as Vic
- Cyrus Arnold as Borgie
- Brianna Hildebrand as Gabriella
- Jason Patric as Coach Wilkes
- Charlie Gillespie as D-Rat Ronnie
- Javier Bolanos as Big Ern
- Carson Boatman as Hank
- Gabrielle Haugh as Candice
- Tichina Arnold as Principal Carey
- Mitch Silpa as Talley
- Siena Goines as Mrs. Rose
- Vivian Bang as Kathy
- Seth Lee as Chris
- Scott Peat as Cecily's Dad
- Jacqueline Guido as Cal's Mom

== Production ==
In July 2018, it was announced that Cameron Boyce had joined the cast of the film, with William Coakley directing from a screenplay he wrote alongside Armand Constantine and Christian van Gregg. It is Coakley's feature film directorial debut. On that same month, Jason Patric, Brianna Hildebrand, Tichina Arnold, Aramis Knight, Nicole Elizabeth Berger, and Mitch Silpa joined the cast of the film.

=== Filming ===
Principal photography began in July 2018. The film was reported to be in post-production when Boyce died of a seizure in his sleep on July 6, 2019. He was 20 years old. This was Boyce's final film that he starred in.

== Release ==
The film was released in February 2020 at the Mammoth Film Festival, where it won an award. In June 2021, 1091 Media acquired distribution rights to the film.

== Reception ==
Runt received a 67% on Rotten Tomatoes.
