= La Corte del Pueblo =

- Created by: Mario Proenza; Enrique Vicencio; Sheldon Baer
- Presented by: Fidel Juarez Garcia (1999–2003); Patricia de Leon (2003–2005)
- Starring: Judges; Cristina Pérez (1999); Manuel Franco (1999–2005); Bailiffs; Michael Riggins (1999–2005); Alexa Tejeda (2003–2005)
- Narrated by: Cesar Ramirez
- Theme music composer: Pierre Garreaud
- Country of origin: United States
- No. of seasons: 5

Production
- Executive producer: Mario Proenza
- Running time: 30 minutes
- Production company: Auckland Entertainment

Original release
- Network: KWHY-TV (1999); Telemundo (1999–2005)
- Release: 1999 – 2005

Related
- La Corte de Familia; Juez Franco

La corte del pueblo (translated The People's Court) is a Spanish-language reality court show that originally aired on KWHY-TV in Los Angeles but later moved to Telemundo. The show was presided over by Cristina Pérez in its first season. When the show moved to Telemundo, Los Angeles-based lawyer Manuel Franco took over the bench. The show ran for five seasons starting in 1999 and ending its run in 2005, when Franco left the show due to a conflict with Telemundo regarding his views on the Latin American community.

== See also ==
- Caso Cerrado
- Judge Judy
