= Patricia de Leon (actress) =

Panamanian actress (born 1978)

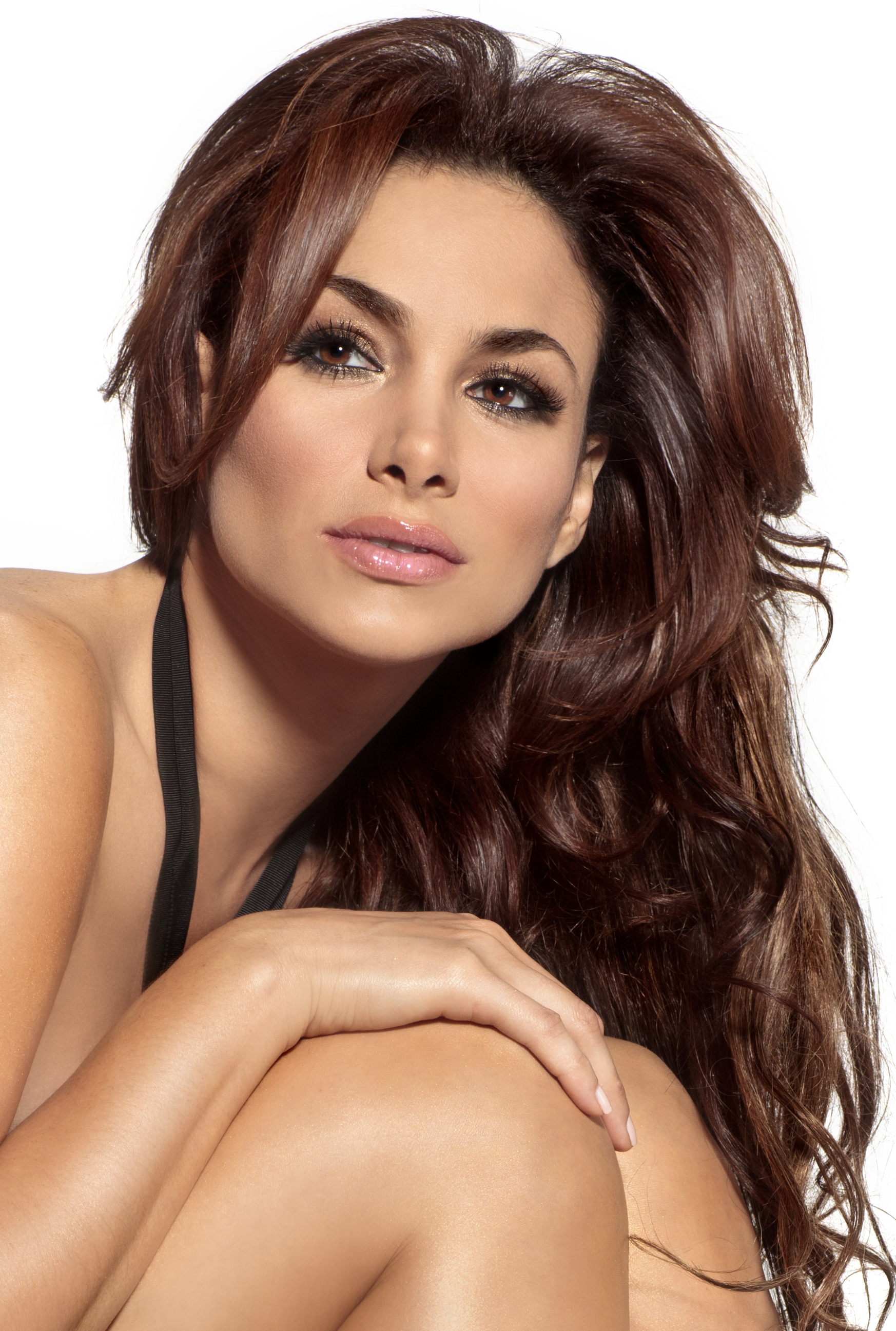
- de Leon in August 2011
- Born: Patricia Michelle de León; January 2, 1978 (age 48); Panama City, Panama
- Occupations: Actress, model, television host
- Years active: 1990–present
- Website: patriciadeleon.com (defunct)

Patricia Michelle de León (Spanish pronunciation: [paˈtɾisja ðe leˈon], born in Panama City, Panama) is a Panamanian actress, TV host, model and beauty pageant title holder. She started working as a model at an early age. After being crowned Miss Panama (1995), she hosted La Corte de Familia and La Corte del Pueblo on Telemundo. She was also featured on Juez Franco on TV Azteca, and the Billboard Latino. From her work on Univision, de Leon obtained roles on American TV, including Lincoln Heights, Cold Case, and Crossing Jordan. Her movie role include The Pool Boys (where she plays the Latina Julia).

== Early life and education ==
De Leon was a contestant in Miss Panama (now Señorita Panamá), she finished in third place and was crowned Miss Hispanidad 1995 at 19 years of age. Her debut on TV was doing the weather for a local station in Panama TVN-Channel 2, followed by featuring as an anchor and a reporter for a news program on the same network. She also created, produced and hosted a tourism show for RPC TV/MEDCOM.

She became an actress in Hollywood by accepting the role of "La Llorona del Río". She has been able to pursue both the Hispanic and American market. She has been featured on shows like Cold Case, Crossing Jordan, Lincoln Heights for ABC Family, La Corte del Pueblo for Telemundo, Perro Amor for the same network, and The Chicago Code for Fox Network, and in films like "How the Garcia Girls spent their summer", "All in", "Love Orchard" and "Pool Boys".

In February 2009, she became the first female winner of the Scripps Howard Super Sage Award thanks to her Super Bowl XLIII prediction of Pittsburgh beating Arizona, 27-24. The final score was actually 27-23. Her prediction was the closest out of more than 100 celebrities who participated in Scripps Howard's Celebrity Super Bowl Poll.

== Activism ==
Patricia de Leon is the spokesperson for "One Love Foundation", which defends the rights and fights against the discrimination of the LGBT (Lesbian, Gay, Bisexual, Transgender) Community. De Leon is a vegetarian and supports animal rights, she has campaigned against bullfighting.

== Filmography ==
- La llorona del río (short) (2001) as Esperanza
- A Design for a Life (short) (2001) as The Wife
- La Corte de Familia (TV series) (2001) as Interviewer
- The Master of Disguise (2002) as Waitress
- La Corte del Pueblo (TV series) (2003) as Interviewer
- All of Us (2004, episode: "Wedding Dance") as an Actress
- How the Garcia Girls Spent Their Summer (2005) as soap opera actress
- Drowned Lives (2006) as Policewoman
- All In (2006) as Maria
- Cloud 9 (2006) as Corazon
- Cold Case (2006, episode: "Baby Blues") as Marta Chavez
- Ghost Whisperer (2006, episode: "Drowned Lives") as Policewoman
- Perro amor (23 episodes) as Jennifer Lopez
- Crossing Jordan (2007, episode: "Isolation") as Magda Garcia
- Blue Lake Massacre (2007)
- Lincoln Heights (2007–2009, 4 episodes) as Sofia/Sophia Muñoz
- Juez Franco (TV series) (2008) as Interviewer
- Mr. Sadman (2009) as Maria
- Men of a Certain Age (2009–2011, 6 episodes) as Fantasy woman
- The Pool Boys (2011) as Julia
- The Chicago Code (2011, episode: "Black Hand and the Shotgun Man") as Beatrice Romero
- Fighting for Freedom (2013) as Maria
- Confessions of a Womanizer (2014) as Patricia
- A Christmas Reunion (2015) as Janette Crowder
- NCIS (2015, episode: "The Artful Dodger") as Gloria Hernandez
- Notorious (2016, episode "Kept and Broken") as Silvia Baez
- Rica, Famosa, Latina (2017, 4 episodes) as herself
- Scorpion (2017) as Lucinda
- A.X.L. (2018) as Joanna Reyes
- Causa Justa (2019)
- Mayans M.C. (2021–2023, 13 episodes) as Diana Alvarez
- The Terminal List (2022) as Paola
- Centurion: The Dancing Stallion (2023) as Isabella Hall

Media offices
Preceded by Jose Luis Gonzalez	Interviewer on La Corte de Familia; 2001–2003	Succeeded by Fidel Juarez Garcia
Preceded by Fidel Juarez Garcia	Interviewer on La Corte del Pueblo; 2003–2005	Succeeded by most recent
