= Clover (2020 film) =

- Film poster
- Directed by: Jon Abrahams
- Written by: Michael Testone
- Produced by: Jon Abrahams; Richard Guay
- Starring: Mark Webber; Nicole Elizabeth Berger; Ron Perlman; Chazz Palminteri; Jon Abrahams
- Cinematography: Matthew Quinn
- Edited by: Aaron Yanes
- Music by: Leon Michels; Matthieu Scheyer
- Production company: Virtuoso Films
- Distributed by: Freestyle Digital Media
- Release date: April 3, 2020
- Running time: 101 minutes
- Country: United States
- Language: English

Clover is a 2020 American crime comedy thriller film directed by Jon Abrahams and starring Mark Webber, Nicole Elizabeth Berger, Ron Perlman, Chazz Palminteri and Abrahams.

== Cast ==
- Mark Webber as Jackie Callahan
- Nicole Elizabeth Berger as Clover
- Jon Abrahams as Mickey "Mick" Callahan
- Ron Perlman as Mr. Wiley
- Diane Gnagnarelli as Mister Wiley's Assistant
- Chazz Palminteri as Anthony "Tony" Davalo
- Erika Christensen as Gertie
- Julia Jones as Virginia
- Jessica Szohr as Angie "Ang"
- Michael Godere as Crazy Joey Davalo
- Jake Weber as Terry
- Tichina Arnold as Pat
- Johnny Messner as Stevie
- Val Lauren as Pete
- Louis Lombardi as Paulie
- Christian George as Frankie
- Brian Goodman as Dominic "Dom"
- Martin Abrahams as Larry
- James J. Alfieri as Gus
- Ari Barkan as Luca

== Release ==
The film was released on demand and digital on April 3, 2020.

== Reception ==
On the review aggregator website Rotten Tomatoes, 28% of 18 critics' reviews are positive, with an average rating of 4.90/10. Enrique Acosta of Film Threat gave the film a 1 out of 10. Simon Abrams of RogerEbert.com awarded the film two and a half stars. Kate Erbland of IndieWire graded the film a C.

Dennis Harvey of Variety gave the film a negative review and wrote, "...this violent caper lacks any real wit or novelty(...), ultimately leaning on tired stereotypes rather than doing anything particularly clever with them."

Frank Scheck of The Hollywood Reporter also gave the film a negative review and wrote, "...it never manages to overcome its air of overfamiliarity, straining mightily but giving off little but flop sweat."
