= Harvey Berger =

American academic

- Born: June 6, 1950 (age 76)
- Education: Colgate University (1972, B.A.); Yale School of Medicine (1977, M.D.)
- Occupations: Founder and Former Chairman & CEO of ARIAD Pharmaceuticals
- Board member of: Dana–Farber Cancer Institute
- Spouse: Chrysanthi Berger (m. 2002)
- Children: 2, including Nicole Berger

Harvey J. Berger is an American physician-scientist, entrepreneur and biotechnology executive. He was the founder and chairman and chief executive officer of ARIAD Pharmaceuticals, Inc. for 25 years, starting in 1991 and became advisor to the board in 2016. He was also executive chairman at Medinol, Inc from 2017 to 2018. In February 2018, Berger was appointed to the Dana–Farber Cancer Institute Board of Trustees.

== Early life and education ==
Berger received his B.A. in Biology from Colgate University in 1972 and received his M.D. from Yale School of Medicine in 1977. He completed further medical and research training at the Massachusetts General Hospital and Yale-New Haven Hospital.

== Career ==
From 1986 until 1991, Berger held executive management positions at Centocor, Inc. including executive vice president and president of the Research and Development Division. He led the development of Remicade® (infliximab), formerly known as Centara, a drug for the treatment of autoimmune diseases such as Crohn's disease, ulcerative colitis and rheumatoid arthritis, ReoPro® (abciximab), formerly known as CentoRx, a drug for the prevention of ischemic complications in patients with CAD undergoing percutaneous interventions, and the cancer diagnostic test, CA125, to evaluate patients with ovarian cancer.

In 1991, Berger founded ARIAD Pharmaceuticals in Cambridge, Massachusetts. He served as chairman and CEO from 1991 to 2015. In 1992, ARIAD raised $46 million, the largest single round of financing for a startup in the biotechnology industry at the time. ARIAD's plan was to develop drugs that would interfere with communication signals within cells, rather than on the cell surface or in between cells. In 1994, ARIAD filed for an initial public offering and was listed on the NASDAQ market.

In 2000, Berger focused ARIAD on oncology, based on recent discoveries in the human genome. Under Berger's leadership, ARIAD grew to over 365 U.S. employees and established a European headquarters in Lausanne, Switzerland.

While Berger was CEO, ARIAD developed five new medicines including the blood-cancer drug Iclusig, Brigatinib, a lung cancer treatment and AP32788 (now known as TAK788), a new medicine for lung cancer with novel mutated genetic targets.

Brigatinib is approved for use in the U.S. and Europe, and TAK788 is continuing a global phase 3 trial.

At the end of 2015, Berger retired from ARIAD and became an advisor to the board of directors. In early 2017, ARIAD was acquired by Takeda Pharmaceuticals, Ltd. for $5.2 billion, becoming part of Takeda Oncology.

In February 2017, Medinol, Inc. announced that Berger would be serving as its executive chairman. On the global management team, his focuses at Medinol would include business management, global strategy, new business and technology initiatives, as well as improving operational efficiency as the company expands worldwide. Berger's role at Medinol was said to include working with their core business of interventional cardiovascular devices, along with its new businesses developing percutaneous aortic valves, sub-millimeter implantable sensors, and related products. He retired from Medinol at the end of 2018. In 2019, Berger retired as chairman and chief executive officer emeritus of ARIAD.

Berger has served on the Board of Trustees at Concord Academy.

Berger has held senior academic and administrative roles at Emory University, Yale University and the University of Pennsylvania. He was also a member of the Dean's Council of Yale University School of Medicine. During his time at Emory, Berger led a program for developing cardiovascular single-photon emission computed tomographic (SPECT) imaging, supported by General Electric Medical Systems. He and other colleagues at Emory collaborated on the development of new quantitative techniques for cardiac SPECT imaging.

Berger has contributed to a wide range of medical journals including the New England Journal of Medicine and American Journal of Cardiology, and has been interviewed by Fox Business and CNBC. He was also an established investigator of the American Heart Association.

== Awards ==
In 2013, Berger was awarded the Ernst & Young Entrepreneur of the Year Award for the New England Region. The award recognizes success in innovation, financial performance, personal commitment to their business communities and other areas. Also in 2013, Berger was awarded a Gold Stevie Award.

== Personal life and philanthropy ==
Berger resides in Palm Beach, Florida, with his wife Chrysanthi and their two daughters, Isabella Grace Berger and Nicole Elizabeth Berger, an actress. Harvey and Chrysanthi Berger have supported the Palm Beach Day Academy, the American Cancer Society, and the Dana–Farber Cancer Institute. In February 2018, Berger was appointed to the Dana–Farber Cancer Institute Board of Trustees, the governing board of the organization.
