= Mammoth Film Festival =

Film festival

Mammoth Film Festival (or "MammothFF") is an annual film festival held every February in Mammoth Lakes, California, United States. Founded in 2018 by Tanner Beard (CEO) and Tomik Mansoori, the festival showcases the work of independent filmmakers, actors, directors, writers, and producers. Its last iteration was Feb 2024. This is a festival not to be confused with Mammoth Lakes Film Festival.

== History ==
The inaugural Mammoth Film Festival was held February 8–11, 2018, and included Sun Dogs, which won the Grand Jury Prize and the awards for Best Picture, Best Director (Jennifer Morrison) and Best Actor (Michael Angarano), as well as Red Hat's Open Source Stories documentary film Road to A.I.

The 2nd Annual Mammoth Film Festival was held February 7–11, 2019, and featured the debut of James Lafferty and Stephen Colletti's original comedy series Everyone Is Doing Great.

The 3rd Annual Mammoth Film Festival was held February 27 to March 2, 2020 and premiered: Ludvig Gür's documentary Pretending I'm A Superman: The Tony Hawk Video Game Story; Quentin Tarantino's documentary QT8: The First Eight (with added footage); Zac Efron's Off The Grid destination series featuring the town of Mammoth Lakes; and independent film Runt, starring Cameron Boyce.

In late 2020, due to the COVID-19 pandemic, the 2021 festival was delayed until 2022.

=== 2022 ===
As of August 2021, the 4th Annual Mammoth Film Festival was scheduled to be held February 3–7, 2022.
