= ARIAD Pharmaceuticals =

Defunct oncology company

ARIAD Pharmaceuticals, Inc.
- Company type: Public
- Traded as: Nasdaq: ARIA
- Industry: Pharmaceuticals, biotechnology
- Founded: 1991; 35 years ago
- Founder: Harvey Berger
- Defunct: 2017
- Fate: Merged with Takeda Pharmaceuticals
- Headquarters: Cambridge, Massachusetts, United States
- Key people: Harvey Berger (chairman, and CEO Emeritus); Alex Denner (chairman of the board); Timothy P. Clackson (president of Research and Development and CSO); Ed Fitzgerald (former CFO); Marty Duvall (former CCO)
- Products: Ponatinib (FDA approved, trade name Iclusig); Ridaforolimus (FDA approved); Brigatinib (FDA approved); Rimiducid (Under development); AP32788 (Under development)
- Revenue: ▼US$118.8 million (2015)
- Operating income: ▲US$−217.27 million (2015)
- Net income: ▲US$−231.16 million (2015)
- Total assets: ▼US$546.69 million (2015)
- Number of employees: 380 (2016)
- Website: ariad.com

ARIAD Pharmaceuticals, Inc. was an American oncology company, now part of Takeda Oncology, which was founded in 1991 by Harvey J. Berger, M.D. and headquartered in Cambridge, Massachusetts. ARIAD engaged in the discovery, development, and commercialization of medicines for cancer patients.

ARIAD’s most prominent drug discoveries include Iclusig, designed for patients with all forms of Philadelphia chromosome-positive [Ph+] chronic myeloid leukemia (CML) or Ph+ acute lymphoblastic leukemia (ALL) who are resistant to or unable to tolerate other tyrosine kinase inhibitors, and brigatinib, a lung cancer drug which has completed its registration trial in ALK fusion driven non-small cell lung cancer as of June 2016 and was approved in the U.S. in April 2017.

In January 2017, Takeda announced it would acquire ARIAD for $5.2 billion, expanding the company's oncology and hematology business. On February 16, 2017, Takeda Pharmaceuticals, Ltd. announced it had completed its acquisition of ARIAD and incorporated ARIAD into Takeda Oncology.

== Company history ==
ARIAD Pharmaceuticals, Inc. was founded in 1991 in Cambridge, Massachusetts by Harvey J. Berger, M.D. ARIAD raised $46 million as its initial financing in 1992, making it the single highest round of funding in the biotechnology industry at that time. ARIAD filed for an initial public offering through NASDAQ in 1994. ARIAD established its European headquarters in Lausanne, Switzerland.

The company sells and markets its initial drug, Iclusig, through specialty pharmacies and specialty distributors in the United States. In 2016, ARIAD sold its European business and the distribution of Iclusig to Incyte Corp and now receives royalties and other payments from Incyte based on Iclusig sales in the EU. ARIAD also developed two small-molecule drugs, ridaforolimus and rimiducid, and licensed them to companies with complementary technologies.

In July 2015, the company announced it was due to receive up to $200 million through a royalty financing deal with PDL BioPharma. ARIAD is obligated to repay the $200 mm and a predefined interest, with the note being guaranteed by future sales of ponatinib and in some cases, brigatinib.

On February 21, 2014 ARIAD Pharmaceuticals announced the appointment of Sarissa Capital's Alexander J. Denner, Ph.D. to a two-year term on the company's Board of Directors and became ARIAD's second-largest shareholder. In 2016, ARIAD announced that Denner had become the chairman of the board and the company announced the termination of its shareholder's rights plan.

In 2016, the company was ranked #3 on the Deloitte Fast 500 North America list.

Berger retired as chairman and CEO of ARIAD in December 2015 and became Founder, chairman and CEO Emeritus as of January 2016.

== Products ==
=== FDA-approved products ===
==== Ponatinib (Iclusig) ====
ARIAD developed Ponatinib (Iclusig), a tyrosine kinase inhibitor for the treatment of adult patients with Philadelphia chromosome-positive [Ph+] chronic myeloid leukemia (CML), and acute lymphoblastic leukemia. On December 14, 2012 the FDA approved ARIAD's leukemia drug Ponatinib for patients with all forms of Ph+ CML or Ph+ acute lymphoblastic leukemia (ALL) who are resistant to or unable to tolerate other tyrosine kinase inhibitors. The drug was temporarily withdrawn from the U.S. market in November 2013 because of the risk of blood clots and severe narrowing of blood vessels. Ponatinib was returned to the market in the U.S. on December 20, 2013 with revised prescribing information, new warnings and a REMS. ARIAD had set up an emergency-access program for Ponatinib, which provided drugs to patients in need during this six-week period. Ponatinib remained on the market in all European countries and was subsequently approved in Japan.

==== Brigatinib (Alunbrig) ====
ARIAD’s product pipeline includes brigatinib, an inhibitor of anaplastic lymphoma kinase [ALK] for treating ALK+ non-small cell lung cancer. This drug reported results of its registration trial at ASCO, June 6, 2016, with encouraging results, leading to approval in the U.S. in April 2017. Brigatinib was designated a Breakthrough Medicine by the FDA.

==== Ridaforolimus (formerly Deforolimus, partnered with Medinol) ====
Ridaforolimus is an mTOR inhibitor being developed by Medinol Ltd for use in drug-eluting stents for patients with coronary artery disease. Medinol has completed two registrational trials in patients with coronary artery disease, which met its primary and secondary endpoints.

In October 2017, Medinol’s EluNIR drug eluting stent, coated with ridaforolimus, received CE Mark in Europe. In November 2017, it was approved for marketing in the U.S. by the FDA.

=== Products under development ===
Various company-sponsored and investigator-sponsored trials are ongoing in several indications, including first line and second line CML, acute lymphoblastic leukemia (BCR-ABL), acute myeloid leukemia (FLT3 inhibitor), non-small cell lung cancer (RET, FGFR), advanced biliary cancer with FGFR2 fusions and other cancers with activating mutations involving the following genes: FGFR1, FGFR2, FGFR3, FGFR4, RET, and KIT.

==== Rimiducid ====
Rimiducid is an investigational chemical dimerizer being developed by partner, Bellicum Pharmaceuticals and is in Phase 3 clinical trials.

==== AP32788 ====
AP32788 is a tyrosine kinase inhibitor of solid tumors with EGFR and HER2 activating mutation and began Phase 1/2 testing in the second quarter of 2016.

== See also ==
- Merck
- Bristol-Myers Squibb
- Pfizer
