= Jon Abrahams =

American actor (born 1977)

- Abrahams in 2026
- Born: Jon Avery Abrahams; October 29, 1977 (age 49); New York City, U.S.
- Occupation: Actor
- Years active: 1994–present

Jon Avery Abrahams (born October 29, 1977) is an American actor and film director. He is best known for his roles in several films such as Sonny Poncelet in Dead Man Walking (1995), Bobby Prinze in Scary Movie, Denny Byrnes in Meet the Parents (both 2000), and Dalton Chapman in House of Wax (2005).

== Early life ==
Abrahams was born in New York City. He attended Saint Ann's School in Brooklyn.

Abrahams' great-uncles were actor Mack Gray – long time confidant of entertainers George Raft, Dean Martin, and Frank Sinatra – and stuntman and fight coordinator Joe Gray. His father is the artist Martin Abrahams.

== Career ==
Abrahams made his film debut in Larry Clark's Kids. His other feature credits include Scary Movie, Meet the Parents, My Boss's Daughter, Boiler Room, and House of Wax.

On television, Abrahams has appeared on Boston Public, Law & Order: Special Victims Unit, Second Generation Wayans, The Mentalist, and Criminal Minds. He was also "DJ Jonny" on The Ellen DeGeneres Show for season four.

In 2013, Abrahams was cast as the lead in the indie movie Room 105. In 2014, Abrahams was cast in We Are Your Friends as a club promoter.

In 2016, Abrahams made his directorial debut with the film All at Once. The film was released on DVD and video-on-demand in 2018. In 2017, Abrahams was cast in the crime drama film Clover, which he also directed. In 2022 he released his third directorial effort with the gay slasher thriller Exploited.

== Filmography ==
=== Film ===
Year	Title	Role	Notes
1995	Kids	Steven	
1995	Dead Man Walking	Sonny Poncelet	
1997	A, B, C... Manhattan	Milo	
1997	Masterminds	K-Dog	
1998	The Faculty	F'%# You Boy	
1999	Star Wars: Episode I – The Phantom Menace	Naboo Flight Crew	Uncredited
1999	Outside Providence	Drugs Delaney	
1999	Pigeonholed		
1999	Bringing Out the Dead	Club Bystander	
2000	Boiler Room	Jeff	
2000	Scary Movie	Bobby Prinze	
2000	Meet the Parents	Denny Byrnes	
2001	Mourning Glory	David Fanelli	
2001	Texas Rangers	Berry Smith	
2001	Scenes of the Crime	Lenny Burroughs	
2002	They	Billy Parks	
2003	My Boss's Daughter	Paul	
2004	What Are the Odds	Mike	Short Film
2005	House of Wax	Dalton	
2005	Standing Still	Pockets	
2005	Prime	Morris	
2006	Bottoms Up	Jimmy Desnappio	Direct-to-DVD film
2006	The Iron Man	Gustavo Payne	
2007	Gardener of Eden	Don	
2008	Who Do You Love	Phil Chess	
2009	2 Dudes and a Dream	Model Instructor	
2009	Not Since You	Howard Stieglitz	
2010	The Penthouse	Tyler's Agent	
2012	Missed Connections	Josh Lindsay	
2012	Hitchcock	Reporter #1	
2013	Amelia's 25th	Sonny	
2014	Non-Stop	David Norton	
2014	Aldo	Jonny	
2014	Come Back to Me	Johnny	
2015	We Are Your Friends	Nicky	
2015	Condemned	Vince	
2016	All at Once	James Maxwell	Directed by
2016	Room 105	Tom	
2019	Apparition	Officer Hale	
2020	10 Things We Should Do Before We Break Up	Tim	
2020	Clover	Mickey	Directed by
2022	Exploited	—N/a	Directed by
2024	Terrifier 3	Dennis	
2026	Scary Movie	Bobby Prinze	

=== Television ===
Year	Title	Role	Notes
1998	Law & Order	Roscoe	Episode: "Damaged"
1999	Outreach	Henry 'Jenks' Jenkins	
2002–2003	Boston Public	Zach Fischer	18 episodes
2003	Law & Order: Special Victims Unit	Robert Logan	Episode: "Mother"
2006	Deceit	Roger	TV movie
2006	Thugaboo: A Miracle on D-Roc's Street	Chad (voice)	TV movie
2008	The Life and Times of Marcus Felony Brown	Cash	TV movie
2011	Masters of the House	Jerry	6 episodes
2013	Second Generation Wayans	Agent	
2014	The Mentalist	Peter Kilgallen	Episode: "Forest Green"
2014	Criminal Minds	Leo Jenkins	Episode: "The Itch"
2015	Major Crimes	Fre$h	Episode: "Special Master: Part One"
2015	The Astronaut Wives Club	Frank Borman	Episode: "The Dark Side"
2016	Hawaii Five-0	Ben Halanu	Episode: "He Moho Hou"
2020	Stumptown	Jared Mendleton	Episode: "At All Costs: The Conrad Costas Chronicles"
2020	Black Hearted Killer	Dennis Cummings	TV movie
2023	Snowfall	Officer Anderson	Episode: "Fallout"
2025 - 2026	High Potential	Ari Weisman	2 episodes
2026	Wonder Man	Frank Preminger	2 episodes

=== Music videos ===
Year	Title	Role	Artist	Notes
2007	"Do You Know?"	The Director	Enrique Iglesias	
