= Nice Dream =

Nice Dream or Nice Dreams may refer to:

- "(Nice Dream)", a song by Radiohead from the 1995 album The Bends
- Nice Dreams, a 1981 film starring Cheech & Chong
- Nice Dreams (album), by Coke Weed, 2012
