= John A. Kuri =

American novelist

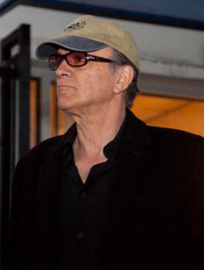
- Kuri in 2016
- Born: John Anthony Kuri; 1945 (age 80–81); Los Angeles, California, U.S.
- Occupations: Author; producer; director
- Writing career
- Language: English
- Notable awards: the Cable Ace, the Christopher Award for excellence in television, the Emmy nomination, the Western Heritage Award, and the Golden Halo Award.

John Anthony Kuri (born 1945) is an American author and screenwriter, film and television producer, director, and production designer. He is the son of set decorator Emile Kuri, who won Academy Awards for William Wyler's The Heiress (1949) and Walt Disney's 20,000 Leagues Under the Sea (1954). John's mother, Caroline Louise Carson, was a gifted portrait, landscape and still life artist who received scholarship to and attended Chouinard Art Institute of Los Angeles.

John Kuri's literary works include Takin’ It Back (2005), a sports-themed novel. It is inspired in part by the Police Athletic League, a national volunteer staffed organization of over 80,000 off-duty police officers who mentor over two million teens annually, and further inspired by Kuri's work with the L.A. Sheriff's Department when he produced and directed officer survival training films and recruitment commercials and trained at the Sheriff's Academy qualifying as a marksmen on their pistol range. Kuri's historical novel Cheyenne Rising Sun (2004) tells the parallel stories of Morning Star—the legendary chief of the Northern Cheyenne Nation and his great grandson Ted Rising Sun, a Korean War veteran and tribal leader. The book was chosen for inclusion in the archives of the American Philosophical Society in 2018. Kuri's screenplay adaptation of the novel was honored with laurels from the 2024 Vail Film Festival Screenplay Competition. The Vail Screenplay Competition is a signature program of the Colorado Film Institute, producer of the annual Vail Film Festival, now entering its 21st year. Another sports-themed inspirational book of Kuri's is "ROD" (2008).

== Career ==
Kuri's filmography has over 145 screen credits on over 68 films including his published story of the Donner Party, One More Mountain (1994) for Disney's Wonderful World of Color and ABC Television' for which he received the Christopher Award, the Louis L’Amour western, Conagher (1991), debuting as TNT's highest-rated two-hour drama and for which the National Cowboy Hall of Fame awarded Kuri their Western Heritage Award. Earlier he co-wrote and produced the MGM release starring Pat Morita Captive Hearts (1987). Then Kuri created the ABC Ohara (TV series) for Warner Bros Television starring Pat Morita, Kevin Conroy, Jon Polito and Rachel Ticotin (1987). and in 1973 he was Emmy-nominated as art director and set decorator of John Steinbeck's The Red Pony.

September 2008 Kuri was asked to have several meetings with Jiao Hongfen (Chinese: 姣轰纷), Vice Chairman of China Film Group (CFGC) and key executives Jiao brought from China for a series of mentoring sessions in Los Angeles. CFGC is the largest, most influential film enterprise in the People's Republic of China, controlling import of all film, and is China's largest film distributor. The meetings led to Kuri proposing a bio-pic on "Jenny" Lang Ping (Chinese: 郎平), the Chinese volleyball star player nicknamed “Iron Hammer” for her thunderous spikes. She won the most valuable player award in women's volleyball at the 1984 Olympics when her team defeated Team USA in Los Angeles. Jiao arranged for Kuri to meet and interview Lang Ping who at the time was coaching the U.S. Women's Olympic volleyball team. Kuri proposed Chinese actress Gong Li (Chinese: 巩俐) to star as Lang Ping. In 2020 the film was released by CFGC under the title Leap. In 2009 Kuri approached the Newport Beach Film Festival to arrange the North American premieres of three motion pictures from the CFGC, including the successful title Looking for Jackie Chan, for the 2010 edition of the festival. The premieres were an extended part of China Festival in Orange County.

A member of the Academy of Motion Picture Arts and Sciences, Kuri was nominated to the Academy's Board of Governors in June, 2022. He is a member of the Directors Guild of America, Writers Guild of America, and Art Directors Guild. He is active in digital media and is the founder of a video portal staytunedtv. September, 2023 John's documentary feature, My Dad: His Remarkable Life won Best International Documentary laurels at the Lebanese Independent Film Festival in Beirut. The Lebanese Film Festival Canada honored Kuri with a "Life Career in Film" award in Montreal on opening night of the 2024 festival. To date ten of John's motion picture titles have received laurels from several international film festivals. May 3, 2025 at an annual gala at the Harvard Club of NYC hosted by Holy Spirit University of Kaslik, Kuri was honored for "his ongoing contributions and remarkable journey of transformation." May, 2026 John's documentary short movie concept trailer, The Young Alchemists, won Best Trailer honors at the Berlin Shorts Film Festival.

Kuri was a Senior Fellow with the Culture of Lawfulness Project for the National Strategy Information Center (NSIC), a Washington, DC–based education and research foundation. Throughout the Middle East and Persian Gulf regions, South America, and Mexico, Kuri spoke at NSIC hosted conferences, mentored participants in workshops and held remote followup sessions on the workshop assignments. The success of the Culture of Lawfulness program is noted by Paula J. Dobriansky, Under Secretary of State for Global Affairs, in her report cited below in "References" footnote 26. Also resulting from this work Kuri wrote the foreword to the 2013 book "Separation of Powers & The Rule of Law, the Lebanese System" from Dr. Akl M. Kairouz and Dr. Issam Y. Atala, professors at Université La Sagesse, Beirut. Continuing his efforts in that region Kuri was invited to speak at The Conference for Reclaiming Neutrality in Lebanon held at Beit Anya, Lebanon on April 23, 2022.

A commercial pilot Kuri has directed aviation sequences for movies and television and, as he did for Ron Howard's Skyward starring Bette Davis and the series Airwolf, he flew the camera plane. NYT critic John J. O'Connor wrote, "The real star of Skyward Christmas (The Skyward sequel) is John A. Kuri, who is in charge of the aerial photography. The scenes of the small planes in flight are swoopingly beautiful..."

Kuri's avocation is jazz guitar with a specific interest in Brazilian rhythms—bossa nova and samba. He has performed in L.A. jazz clubs as a member of the Stephen Boyd Quartet and as the leader of his sextet, John Kuri's Elixir and Friends.
