= More than Miyagi, The Pat Morita Story =

- Directed by: Kevin Derek
- Produced by: Evelyn Guerrero
- Starring: Pat Morita
- Release date: 2021
- Running time: 89 minutes
- Country: United States
- Language: English

More than Miyagi, The Pat Morita Story is a 2021 documentary film produced by Evelyn Guerrero and directed by Kevin Derek about the life of actor Pat Morita, Guerrero's late husband.

== Origins ==
Evelyn Guerrero attempted for years to get the film made, but to no avail. After Guerrero was interviewed for the 2015 documentary The Real Miyagi about Morita's friend and stunt double for The Karate Kid, Fumio Demura, she offered the documentary's director, Kevin Derek, the opportunity to tell the story of Morita's life.

The production finally gained momentum following the success of Cobra Kai, the Netflix Karate Kid spinoff television series.

More than Miyagi is patterned after Pat Morita's unfinished memoir with the final third covering his alcoholism.

The Las Vegas Review-Journal quoted Morita saying once before his passing, "If I can help one poor bastard with this disease, then I would have felt like I did something good, that I left something good on this Earth."

== Critical reception ==
Entertainment Weekly wrote, "Director Kevin Derek explores the actor's extraordinary life and varied career, from his childhood battle with spinal tuberculosis to his early days as a stand-up comedian to his later struggles with drug and alcohol addiction."

Common Sense Media called the film an, "Intimate, honest biography [that] addresses racism... alcoholism."

Bleeding Cool gave the film a rating of nine out of ten, saying it was, "A heart-warming documentary about the life of Pat Morita, "More Than Miyagi" chronicles the late actor-comedian who spent his entire career bringing joy to others while chronicling battling his own demons at the end of the bottle."
