= Kathleen Widdoes =

American actress (born 1939)

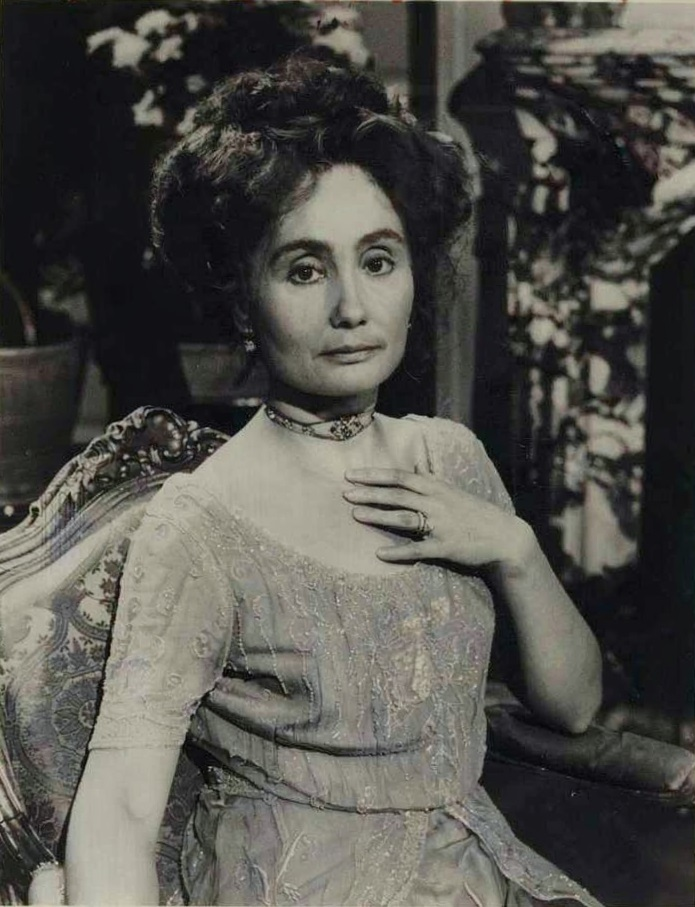
- Widdoes in 1984
- Born: Kathleen Effie Widdoes; March 21, 1939 (age 87); Wilmington, Delaware, U.S.
- Education: Sorbonne
- Occupation: Actress
- Years active: 1958–present
- Spouses: Richard Jordan (m. 1964; div. 1972): Jerry Senter
- Children: 1

Kathleen Effie Widdoes (born March 21, 1939) is an American actress. She is known for playing the role of Emma Snyder on the CBS Daytime soap opera As the World Turns (1985 to 2010). For her work on As the World Turns, she was nominated for a Daytime Emmy Award for Outstanding Supporting Actress in a Drama Series in 1986, 1987, and 1991. She also received a Daytime Emmy nomination for Outstanding Lead Actress in a Drama Series in 1994. Widdoes has appeared in theatrical productions, including The Beggar's Opera (1972), Much Ado About Nothing (1972), Brighton Beach Memoirs (1983), The Tower of Evil (1991), Hamlet (1992), and Franny's Way (2002). She has been nominated for a Tony Award and a Drama Desk Award. She has won two Obie Awards and a Lucille Lortel Award. Widdoes has also appeared in films, including The Group (1966), The Sea Gull (1968), and Courage Under Fire (1996).

== Early life ==
Widdoes was born on March 21, 1939, in Wilmington, Delaware. She is the oldest of six siblings, all raised by their mother. She has said that her father ran away from the family when she was very young. She has three brothers and two sisters. In Delaware, she performed in an amateur theater company's production of They Ain't Done Right By Nell. Widdoes moved to New York after high school. She had never studied acting, but she began to land roles.

== Career ==
=== 1958-1962: Early work ===
Widdoes played Teusret in the original Broadway production of The Firstborn. The play opened at the Coronet Theatre on April 29, 1958. She co-starred with Katharine Cornell. Widdoes also performed in Arthur Miller's A View from the Bridge (1958). She played a Tourist in the original Broadway production of The World of Suzie Wong. The play opened at the Broadhurst Theatre on October 14, 1958.

On television, Widdoes was cast as Jill Malone on the NBC soap opera Young Doctor Malone, playing the role from 1958 to 1959. In October 1959, she played Irina in Chekhov's Three Sisters at New York's Fourth Street Theater. In 1960, she performed in Henry V and Measure for Measure at the New York Shakespeare Festival. In September 1960, she appeared in Dostoevsky's The Idiot at the Gate Theatre.

Widdoes performed in Richard II, A Midsummer Night's Dream, and Romeo and Juliet at the New York Shakespeare Festival in 1961. She also appeared in The Tempest for the NYSF in 1962. Widdoes had a singing role in the musical We Take the Town (1962), but she heard through the dressing room wall that she was going to be fired, so she gave her notice that she was leaving.

=== 1963–1969: The Group ===
She appeared in The Maids at the Aldana Theatre in November 1963, co-starring with Lee Grant. Widdoes spent 1964 in Paris, studying at the Sorbonne on a Fulbright scholarship. She trained as a mime. In 1966, she played Alice Sycamore in a Broadway revival of You Can't Take It with You at the Lyceum Theatre. She replaced Rosemary Harris in the role. Widdoes made her film debut as Helena Davison in The Group (1966), directed by Sidney Lumet. She guest starred on 12 O'Clock High.

She played Tina in the television film A Bell for Adano (1967), co-starring with John Forsythe. In April 1967, she starred in To Clothe the Naked at the Sheridan Square Playhouse. She guest starred on The Invaders. She appeared in productions of 'Tis Pity She's a Whore and Three Sisters at the Yale Repertory Theatre.

Widdoes played Wilma in the film Petulia (1968), co-starring with Julie Christie. She also played Masha in a film adaptation of Chekhov's The Sea Gull (1968), directed again by Sidney Lumet. On television, she guest starred on The F.B.I. and Here Come the Brides. In 1969, she co-starred with Robert Loggia in an Off-Broadway production of World War 2 1/2.

=== 1971–1977: Much Ado About Nothing ===
In 1971, she played Maggie West in the horror film The Mephisto Waltz, co-starring with Alan Alda. In 1972, she guest starred on Bonanza. She played Leslie in the film Savages (1972), directed by James Ivory. Widdoes shared nude scenes with her co-star, Sam Waterston, and she posed for nude photos in Playboy to promote the movie.

In June 1972, Widdoes played Polly Peachum in The Beggar's Opera at the McAlpin Rooftop Theatre. She won an Obie Award for her performance. She starred as Beatrice in a New York Shakespeare Festival production of Much Ado About Nothing. The play was recorded and aired on CBS. For her work in Much Ado, Widdoes was nominated for a Tony Award for Best Actress in a Play in 1973. She appeared in the television film The Return of Charlie Chan (1973). She guest starred on Toma. In June 1973, Widdoes played Rosalind in As You Like It at the Delacorte Theater.

She played Margaret in the television film Punch and Jody (1974), co-starring with Glenn Ford. In 1975, she starred as Viola in Twelfth Night at the Stratford Festival in Canada. Widdoes also played Mariana in Measure for Measure at the Stratford Festival. In February 1977, she starred in the musical Castaways at New York's Promenade Theater. She guest starred on Kojak. Widdoes returned to Broadway, playing Cecily in a revival of The Importance of Being Earnest. The play opened at the Circle in the Square Theatre on May 27, 1977.

=== 1978–1987: As the World Turns ===
Widdoes was cast as Rose Perrini on the NBC soap opera Another World, playing the role from 1978 to 1980. The character was the mother of Joe Perrini (Ray Liotta). In March 1981, she starred in Stops Along the Way and In Fireworks Lie Secret Codes at the Mitzi E. Newhouse Theater. She guest starred on Secrets of Midland Heights and Nurse. Widdoes starred as author Edith Wharton in Edith Wharton: Looking Back, an episode of the PBS series Great Performances.

She played Mrs. Alving in a production of Ghosts for the American Repertory Theater. She appeared in the film I'm Dancing as Fast as I Can (1982). In December 1982, Widdoes played Gertrude in Hamlet at The Public Theater. In 1983, she had a recurring role as Una MacCurtain on the ABC soap opera Ryan's Hope. She played Ms. Hauser in the film Without a Trace. Widdoes appeared as Blanche Morton in the original Broadway production of Brighton Beach Memoirs. She replaced Anita Gillette in the role.

She was cast in the contract role of Emma Snyder on the CBS soap opera As the World Turns, first airing in July 1985. The character was the owner of a farm and the matriarch of a large family, including son Holden Snyder (Jon Hensley). Widdoes appeared in the television film Mafia Princess (1986), co-starring with Susan Lucci. For her work on As the World Turns, she was nominated for a Daytime Emmy Award for Outstanding Supporting Actress in a Drama Series in 1986. She was nominated again in the same category in 1987.

=== 1990–present ===
In May 1990, Widdoes played Margaret in The Tower of Evil for the Classic Stage Company. She received an Obie Award for her performance. For her work on As the World Turns, she received her third Daytime Emmy Award nomination in 1991 for Outstanding Supporting Actress. In July 1991, Widdoes played Jan Kirkland in Man in his Underwear at the Williamstown Theatre Festival.

She starred as Gertrude in a Broadway revival of Hamlet. The play opened in previews at Criterion Center Stage Right on March 11, 1992. For her work on As the World Turns, she was nominated for a Daytime Emmy Award for Outstanding Lead Actress in a Drama Series in 1994. She was switched to recurring status at ATWT in 1995. In February 1995, Widdoes played Nora Culligan in The Truth-Teller for the Circle Repertory Company. In October 1995, she played Maria in Moonlight for the Roundabout Theater Company.

Widdoes played Geraldine Walden in the film Courage Under Fire (1996), co-starring with Denzel Washington. In October and November 1996, she starred in The Rose Tattoo at the American Conservatory Theater in San Francisco. In 1997, she began playing the recurring role of Mrs. Beecher on the HBO series Oz. She appeared as Frankie in the comedy film Hi-Life (1998). In February 1998, she played Maria Callas in Master Class for North Carolina's PlayMakers Repertory Company. She starred in Long Day's Journey into Night at the American Conservatory Theater. Widdoes guest starred on Law & Order in 1999.

In March and April 2002, Widdoes starred in Franny's Way at The Atlantic Theatre. She co-starred with Elisabeth Moss. Widdoes won the Lucille Lortel Award (Featured Actress) for her performance. In December 2004, she appeared in Noël Coward's After the Ball at The Irish Repertory Theatre. In January 2007, she starred as Lady Kitty in The Circle at the American Conservatory Theater. The cancellation of As the World Turns was announced on December 8, 2009. Widdoes made her last appearance on the show in June 2010.

== Personal life ==
In 1961, Widdoes met actor Richard Jordan when they played the lead roles in a Shakespeare Festival production of Romeo and Juliet. They married in Paris in 1964, while she was studying at the Sorbonne. They had a daughter, born the same year. They were later divorced.

She is married to Jerry Senter.

== Filmography ==
=== Film ===
Year	Title	Role	Notes
1966	The Group	Helena Davison	
1968	Petulia	Wilma	
1968	The Sea Gull	Masha	
1971	The Mephisto Waltz	Maggie West	
1972	Savages	Leslie	
1982	I'm Dancing as Fast as I Can	Dr. Rawlings	
1983	Without a Trace	Ms. Hauser	
1996	Courage Under Fire	Geraldine Walden	
1998	Hi-Life	Frankie	

=== Television ===
Year	Title	Role	Notes
1958–1959	Young Doctor Malone	Jill Malone	
1958–1959	Camera Three		3 episodes
1959	The Art Carney Special	Emily Webb	Episode: "Our Town"
1960	Startime	Rachel	Episode: "Jeff McCleod, the Last Reb"
1960–1962	Festival	Joan of Arc; Ondine	3 episodes
1961	Way Out	Bonnie Draco	Episode: "Dissolve to Black"
1961	Look Up and Live	Elektra	Episode: "The Flies"
1961	Armstrong Circle Theatre	Anna Halber	Episode: "A Chapter on Tyranny: Dateline Berlin"
1962	The DuPont Show of the Week	Kathy Allen	Episode: "The Movie Star"
1962; 1963	The Defenders	Sandra Mason; Theresa Sullivan	Episodes: "The Benefactor", "The Star Spangled Ghetto"
1963	The Doctors	Charity	5 episodes
1965	The Nurses	Young Woman	Episode: "Sixteen Hours to Chicago"
1966	12 O'Clock High	Lt. Irina Zavanoff	Episode: "Massacre"
1967	The Invaders	Ellen Woods	Episode: "Nightmare"
1967	A Bell for Adano	Tina Tomasino	Television film
1968	Here Come the Brides	Dr. Allyn Wright	Episode: "A Crying Need"
1968	The F.B.I.	Margaret Kane	Episode: "The Hero"
1972	Bonanza	Anna Kosovo	Episode: "Frenzy"
1973	Much Ado About Nothing	Beatrice	Television film
1973	Toma	Marian Dalton	Episode: "The Bambara Bust"
1973	The Return of Charlie Chan	Irene Hadrachi	Television film
1974	The American Parade	Anne Bradstreet	Episode: "We the Women"
1974	Punch and Jody	Margaret Howell Grant	Television film
1975	ABC's Wide World of Entertainment	Joan Harper	Episode: "Please Call It Murder"
1977	The Andros Targets	Bonnie Stanik	Episode: "A Currency for Murder"
1977	Kojak	Sonia	Episode: "Another Gypsy Queen"
1978–1980	Another World	Rose Perrini	
1981	Secrets of Midland Heights	Helen Millington Dulles	Episode: "The Birthday Party"
1981	Great Performances	Edith Wharton	Episode: "Edith Wharton: Looking Back"
1981	Nurse	Dr. Carol Swanson	Episode: "My Life as a Woman"
1983	Ryan's Hope	Una MacCurtain	Recurring role, 9 episodes
1985–2010	As the World Turns	Emma Snyder	Contract role: 1985–1995, Recurring role: 1995–2010
1986	Mafia Princess	Angelina Giancana	Television film
1991	American Playhouse	Esther Rosenbloom	Episode: "The Hollow Boy"
1997–2002	Oz	Mrs. Beecher	Episodes: "Straight Life", "Works of Mercy", "Impotence"
1999	Law & Order	Judge Childers	Episode: "Sideshow: Part 1"

== Awards and nominations ==
Year	Award	Category	Title	Result	Ref.
1972	Obie Award	Distinguished Performance	The Beggar's Opera	Won	
1973	Tony Award	Best Actress in a Play	Much Ado About Nothing	Nominated	
1986	Daytime Emmy Award	Outstanding Supporting Actress in a Drama Series	As the World Turns	Nominated	
1987	Daytime Emmy Award	Outstanding Supporting Actress in a Drama Series	As the World Turns	Nominated	
1991	Obie Award	Performance	The Tower of Evil	Won	
1991	Daytime Emmy Award	Outstanding Supporting Actress in a Drama Series	As the World Turns	Nominated	
1994	Daytime Emmy Award	Outstanding Lead Actress in a Drama Series	As the World Turns	Nominated	
2002	Lucille Lortel Award	Featured Actress	Franny's Way	Won	
2002	Drama Desk Award	Featured Actress in a Play	Franny's Way	Nominated	
