= Back to Soft =

Studio album by Coke Weed
- Released: July 23, 2013
- Genre: Indie rock, neo-psychedelia
- Length: 41:20
- Label: Beyond Beyond Is

Coke Weed chronology
Nice Dreams (2012)	Back to Soft (2013)

Back to Soft is the third album by psychedelic rock band Coke Weed. It was released on July 23, 2013. The album was self-produced and mixed by Nick Stumpf.

== Reception ==
Professional ratings
Review scores
Source	Rating
Consequence of Sound	(C+)
The Phoenix	(positive)
AltSounds	(79%)
Ear Buddy	(7.8/10)

== Track listing ==
All tracks are written by Milan McAlevey.

No.	Title	Length
1.	"Sunseekers"	3:55
2.	"Back to Soft"	4:06
3.	"Anklet"	4:34
4.	"Desert Sleeper"	3:56
5.	"Poison"	4:28
6.	"Maryanne"	3:40
7.	"Blue Flag"	5:23
8.	"Som"	3:50
9.	"Buckets"	4:15
10.	"Manchester"	3:13
Total length:		41:20

== Personnel ==
- Coke Weed

- Nina Donghia - vocals
- Milan McAlevey - guitar, vocals
- Caleb Davis - guitar, backing vocals
- Zach Soares - bass
- Peter Cuffari - drums, and percussion
