= The Sea Gull =

1968 film by Sidney Lumet

- Theatrical release poster
- Directed by: Sidney Lumet
- Screenplay by: Moura Budberg (trans.)
- Based on: The Seagull; 1896 play by Anton Chekhov
- Produced by: F. Sherwin Green; Sidney Lumet
- Starring: James Mason; Vanessa Redgrave; Simone Signoret; David Warner; Harry Andrews; Denholm Elliott; Eileen Herlie; Alfred Lynch; Ronald Radd; Kathleen Widdoes
- Cinematography: Gerry Fisher
- Edited by: Alan Heim
- Music by: Mikis Theodorakis
- Production companies: Sidney Lumet Productions; Warner Bros.-Seven Arts
- Distributed by: Warner Bros.-Seven Arts (US); Warner-Pathé (UK)
- Release dates: December 23, 1968 (US); November 1969 (UK)
- Running time: 141 minutes
- Countries: United States; United Kingdom
- Language: English

The Sea Gull is a 1968 British-American drama film directed by Sidney Lumet. The screenplay by Moura Budberg is adapted and translated from Anton Chekhov's classic 1896 play The Seagull.

The Warner Bros.-Seven Arts release was filmed at the Europa Studios in Sundbyberg, just outside central Stockholm.

== Plot ==
Set in a rural Russian house, the plot focuses on the romantic and artistic conflicts among an eclectic group of characters. Fading leading lady Irina Arkadina has come to visit her brother Sorin, a retired civil servant in ailing health, with her lover, the successful hack writer Trigorin. Her son, brooding experimental playwright Konstantin Treplev, adores the ingenue Nina, who in turn is mesmerized by Trigorin. Their interactions slowly provoke the moral and spiritual disintegration of each of them and ultimately lead to tragedy.

== Cast ==
- Vanessa Redgrave as Nina
- Simone Signoret as Irina Arkadina
- David Warner as Konstantin Treplev
- James Mason as Boris Alexeyevich Trigorin
- Harry Andrews as Pjotr Nikolayevich Sorin
- Denholm Elliott as Dr. Yevgeny Dorn
- Eileen Herlie as Polina
- Alfred Lynch as Semyon Medvedenko
- Ronald Radd as Shamraev
- Kathleen Widdoes as Masha

== Principal production credits ==
- Cinematography - Gerry Fisher
- Production Design - Tony Walton
- Set Decoration - Rune Hjelm, Rolf Larsson
- Costume Design - Tony Walton

== Critical reception ==
In his review in The New York Times, Vincent Canby described the film as "so uneven in style, mood and performance that there are times when you could swear that the movie had shot itself — though not quite fatally". Canby also mischaracterized the camera work, saying "Lumet's way with this adaptation by Moura Budberg is implacably straightforward. It plows ahead, scene by scene, act by act, in which there always is first an establishing long shot and then cuts to individual actors as they act and react. This kind of Secret Storm technique inevitably flattens out the nuances and the pauses that give depth to the tangled personal relationships. It also makes too literal the boredom and quiet despair that should hang over the Chekovian characters like an unseen mist. Most of the performances are excellent, but all of the actors seem to be on their own . . . Miss Signoret is simply miscast, if only because of her Frenchness. Her speech rhythms are so jarring that it's often impossible to understand her . . . As a result of the variety of styles, the movie turns into a series of individual confrontations that seem as isolated as specialty acts. Without the single dominating influence that should have been provided by Lumet, the play is fragmented beyond repair."

Time observed, "The paralyzing problem with this film version of Chekhov's first major play is that it is far too dramatic . . . Any traces of wit have been pretty well destroyed by Lumet's lumbering technique. The actors perform as if they were all on the verge of a nervous breakdown . . . Lumet moves his camera incessantly to give the illusion of action, but uses fadeouts to duplicate the curtain falling at the end of an act . . . Most disturbing of all, [he] and cinematographer Gerry Fisher have shot the whole film in softly gauzed pastel colors, thereby reducing Chekhov's intricate dramatic tapestry to the sleazy cheapness of a picture postcard."

Variety called it "a sensitive, well-made and abstractly interesting period pic."

According to the Time Out London Film Guide, it is "basically an actors' film . . . sometimes dull and almost always unsatisfactory, despite excellent performances."
