= The Don Rickles Show =

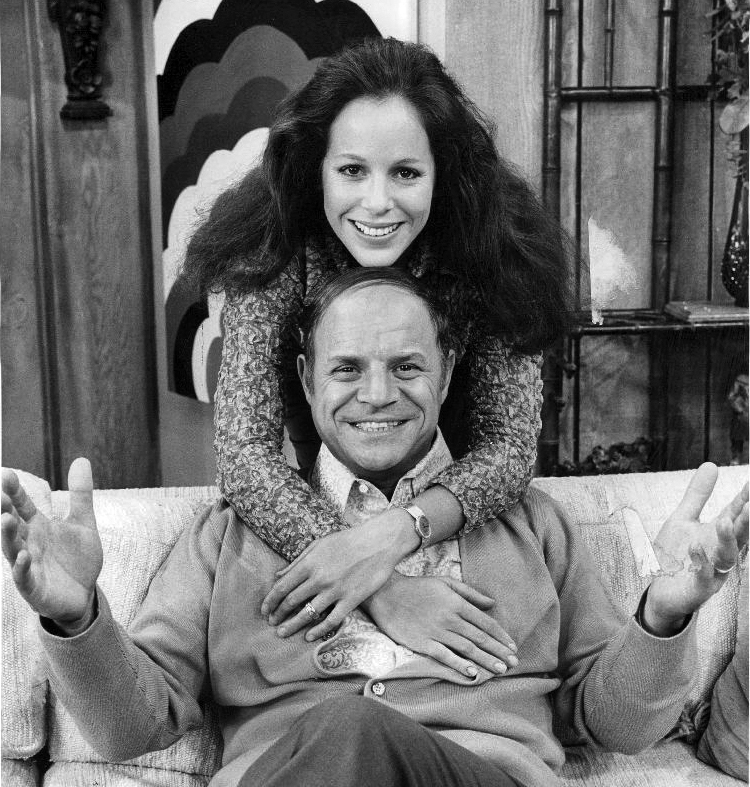
- Rickles and Louise Sorel, 1971
- Genre: Comedy
- Created by: Sam Denoff
- Starring: Don Rickles; Louise Sorel; Erin Moran; Robert Hogan; Joyce Van Patten
- Country of origin: United States
- Original language: English
- No. of seasons: 1
- No. of episodes: 13

Production
- Executive producer: Joseph Scandore
- Producers: Sam Denoff; Sheldon Leonard; Hy Averback
- Running time: 22 minutes
- Production company: Sheldon Leonard Productions

Original release
- Network: CBS
- Release: January 14 – May 26, 1972

The Don Rickles Show is an American comedy television series. The series stars Don Rickles, Louise Sorel, Erin Moran, Robert Hogan, and Joyce Van Patten. The series aired on CBS from January 14 until May 26, 1972. It ranked 56th out of 78 shows that season with an average 15.5 rating. It shares the same title as a short-lived variety series that Rickles had headlined on ABC in 1968.

== Premise ==
The Don Rickles Show focused on an advertising agency executive, and his "life and endless problems" with his job and his family. Don Robinson, the main character, encountered difficulties both at work and at home. His battles apparently did not appeal to audiences, leading to the series's four-month run.

== Cast ==
- Don Rickles as Don Robinson
- Louise Sorel as Barbara Robinson
- Erin Moran as Janie Robinson
- Robert Hogan as Tyler Benedict
- Joyce Van Patten as Jean Benedict
- Barry Gordon as Conrad Musk
- Judith Cassmore as Audrey

== Personnel ==
Sheldon Leonard and Joseph Scandore were executive producers, Hy Averback was the producer, and Sam Denoff was the creator and executive consultant.

== Episodes ==
No.	Title	Directed by	Written by	Original release date
1	"Premiere"	Unknown	Unknown	January 14, 1972
2	"Greetings from Uncle Sam"	Unknown	Unknown	January 21, 1972
3	"The Mercy of the Court"	Unknown	Unknown	January 28, 1972
4	"Don's New Used Car"	Unknown	Unknown	February 4, 1972
5	"The Moo Cow Child"	Unknown	Unknown	February 11, 1972
6	"Strictly Neutral"	Unknown	Unknown	February 18, 1972
7	"When There's a Will..."	Unknown	Unknown	March 3, 1972
8	"The Candidate"	Unknown	Unknown	March 10, 1972
9	"The Dr. Rudolph Affair"	Unknown	Unknown	March 17, 1972
10	"Split Ticket"	Unknown	Unknown	March 24, 1972
11	"Watch on the Line"	Unknown	Unknown	March 31, 1972
12	"I Want My Quarterback"	Unknown	Unknown	April 14, 1972
13	"Audrey Come Home"	Unknown	Unknown	April 21, 1972
