= Milton Goldstein (film executive) =

American executive (1926–2015)

Milton Goldstein (August 1, 1926 – August 10, 2015) was an American film industry executive.

== Early life and education ==
Goldstein was born in New York City on August 1, 1926. He was educated at New York University, graduating in 1949.

== Career ==
Goldstein worked as an executive at Paramount. He was foreign sales coordinator for the movies The Ten Commandments and Psycho. He was Vice President of foreign sales at Samuel Bronston Org, Assistant to the President of Paramount International Special Productions in 1964, and Foreign Sales Manager in 1966. He became VP of World Wide Sales in 1967 of Cinerama, and Senior VP of Cinema Center Films in 1969.

In 1971 Goldstein was president of Cinema Center Films, and VP of Theatrical Marketing & Sales of Metromedia Producers Corp in 1973. He was presented with a Johann awards for his success in marketing Columbia Masterworks products.

Goldstein formed Boasberg-Goldstein in March 1974 as a consultant in production and distribution of motion pictures. He was named Executive VP of Avco Embassy Pictures in 1975, Executive VP & CEO of Melvin Simon Productions in 1978 and president in 1980, and CEO of Simon/Reeves/Landburg.

Goldstein was president of Milt Goldstein Enterprises Inc. in 1985, and Chairman and CEO of HKM Films in 1990. He was President of Introvision movies in 1991.

Goldstein acted as Executive Producer of Captive Hearts 1987 and Porky's 3 Revenge 1985. Played Bernie in Reckless Kelly 1993.

== Death ==
Goldstein died in Los Angeles on August 10, 2015, at the age of 89.

== See also ==
- Captive Hearts (film)

== Sources ==
- Television & Video Almanac QP 1994 3rd Edition
- John A. Willis (1988). John Willis' Screen World. Applause Books. ISBN 9780517569634.
- Entertainment World. Entertainment World Publications. 1970.
- Film News. Film News Company. 1948. p. 21.
- Gene Brown (1984). The New York Times Encyclopedia of Film: 1964-1968. Times Books. ISBN 978-0-8129-1059-9.
