= Coke Weed =

American psychedelic rock band

- Origin: Bar Harbor, Maine, U.S.
- Genres: Psychedelic rock; neo-psychedelia; indie rock
- Years active: 2010–present
- Labels: Beyond Beyond Is, Teenarena
- Members: Nina Donghia; Milan McAlevey; Caleb Davis; Zach Soares; Peter Cuffari
- Website: cokeweed.com

Coke Weed is an American psychedelic rock band from Bar Harbor, Maine, United States. Its lineup consists of Nina Donghia (vocals), Milan McAlevey (guitar and vocals), Caleb Davis (guitar), Zach Soares (bass guitar), and Peter Cuffari (drums). Lead vocal duties are shared between Nina and Milan.

The band's unique blend of indie and psychedelic rock is strongly influenced by bands of the 1960s, and described as "slow and dreamy psych-rock."

== Origins ==
After forming The Lil' Fighters with Walter Martin in the late 1990s, McAlevey recorded several albums at The Walkmen's original Marcata Recording Studio in Harlem. Eventually, he left the band and New York for Maine and teamed up with Donghia in Bar Harbor on Mount Desert Island to form Coke Weed. The band spent late 2010 recording their debut album, Coke Weed Volume One, which was released the following year.

== History (2012–present) ==
Instead of promoting or touring 'Volume One,' the group got back to work recording their second album Nice Dreams, which was released in the Spring of 2012. The band toured the east coast heavily in the Spring and Summer of 2012 supporting The Walkmen and Woods.

The band spent the first half of 2013 playing shows mostly in their home state of Maine and working on their third LP, Back to Soft, which was released in late October 2013. After release, the band hit the road again touring the east coast. Back to Soft was a small breakthrough for the band and was featured in many national media outlets including The A.V. Club, Paste Magazine, Consequence of Sound, NPR Music, and Spin Magazine.

== Members ==
- Nina Donghia – vocals
- Milan McAlevey – guitar, vocals
- Caleb Davis – guitar
- Zach Soares – bass
- Peter Cuffari – drums

== Discography ==
=== Studio albums ===
- Coke Weed Volume One (2011)
- Nice Dreams (2012)
- Back to Soft (2013)
