= Evelyn Guerrero =

American actress

- Occupation: Actress
- Years active: 1969–1999
- Spouse: Pat Morita (m. 1994; died 2005)

Evelyn Guerrero Morita is an American retired actress who starred in various movies and television series from 1969 to 1999.

She is best known for portraying "Donna" in three Cheech and Chong movies. In 1980, Guerrero posed in Playboy magazine.

== Personal life ==
Guerrero met Pat Morita when she was 15. They reunited almost 30 years later and were married in 1994 until his death in 2005. She assisted him in producing More than Miyagi, The Pat Morita Story.

== Filmography ==
=== Film ===
Year	Title	Role	Notes
1969	Wild Wheels	Sissy	
1978	The Toolbox Murders	Maria	
1979	She Came to the Valley	Connie	
1980	Cheech and Chong's Next Movie	Donna	
1981	Nice Dreams	Donna	
1982	Things Are Tough All Over	Donna	
1991	Alligator II: The Mutation	Elena	
1993	Blood In Blood Out	Luisa	
1995	...And the Earth Did Not Swallow Him	Lupita	
1999	Inferno	Bertie Early	
2021	More Than Miyagi--The Pat Morita Story	herself	documentary

=== Television ===
Year	Title	Role	Notes
1976	Police Woman	Ziba	"Tender Soldier"
1976	The Quest	Delores	"Shanklin"
1980	The Return of Frank Cannon	Inez	TV film
1984	Whiz Kids	Dorita	"Watch Out!"
1985	Hill Street Blues	Mrs. Pinzon	"The Virgin and the Turkey"
1986	The Colbys	Jane	"A Family Affair"
1986	Dallas	Rosie	"Overture"
1987	Star Trek: The Next Generation	Young Female Ensign	"Encounter at Farpoint"
1987	I Married Dora	Marisol	"My Parents Are Coming", "Club Montez"
1987	Simon & Simon	D.A. Anita Sanchez	"New Cop in Town"
1987	The Facts of Life	Mrs. Martinez	"Adventures in Baileysitting"
1988	CBS Summer Playhouse	Lupe Cordero	"Fort Figueroa"
1988	Hunter	Santana	"Dead on Target: Part 1"
1989–1990	Dallas	Nancy	"Sunset, Sunrise", "A Tale of Two Cities", "The Odessa File"
1991	Dynasty: The Reunion	Maid	"1.1"
