= Captive Hearts (film) =

1987 film by Paul Almond

- Theatrical release poster
- Directed by: Paul Almond
- Written by: John A. Kuri; Pat Morita
- Produced by: Milton Goldstein; John A. Kuri
- Starring: Noriyuki "Pat" Morita; Chris Makepeace; Mari Sato; Michael Sarrazin
- Cinematography: Thomas Vámos
- Edited by: Yurij Luhovy
- Music by: Osamu Kitajima
- Distributed by: Metro-Goldwyn-Mayer
- Release date: June 5, 1987 (U.S.)
- Running time: 97 minutes
- Countries: Canada; United States; Japan
- Languages: English; Japanese
- Box office: $73,757

Captive Hearts (aka Fate of a Hunter) is a 1987 romantic-drama movie co-produced between Canada, the U.S. and Japan starring Pat Morita, and co-written by Morita and John A. Kuri. It was directed by Paul Almond, filmed in Canada and released in the United States on June 5, 1987.

== Plot ==
Shot down over 1944 wartime Japan in the depths of winter, an American airman and his Sergeant are captured by villagers but their lives are spared by the village elder, an ex-Colonel of the Japanese Army whose son was killed by an American bombing raid on a hospital where the son had been a doctor. The son had been married and his widow, Miyoko, still lives in the village. The sergeant tries to escape but dies in the attempt. The young airman, Robert, is protected by the headman, he is accepted by most of the villagers, he integrates into the village life and he and Miyoko fall in love, though a local man becomes jealous of their new romantic relationship and the romantic couple are then in danger because of their deep, blossoming romance.

The Japanese military are not far away, and the headman decides to help Robert escape. His assistance leads to a tragic ending.

== Cast ==
- Pat Morita as Fukushima
- Chris Makepeace as Lieutenant Robert
- Mari Sato as Miyoko
- Michael Sarrazin as Sergeant McManus

== Filming locations ==
Canada

- Laurentian Mountains
