= Inferno (1999 film) =

1999 American action film

- Theatrical release poster
- Directed by: John G. Avildsen
- Screenplay by: Tom O'Rourke
- Produced by: Lawrence Levy; Evzen Kolar; Jean-Claude Van Damme
- Starring: Jean-Claude Van Damme; Pat Morita; Danny Trejo; Gabrielle Fitzpatrick; Larry Drake; Vincent Schiavelli
- Cinematography: Ross A. Maehl
- Edited by: J. Douglas Seelig
- Music by: Bill Conti
- Distributed by: Columbia TriStar Home Video
- Release date: September 25, 1999
- Running time: 95 minutes
- Country: United States
- Language: English
- Budget: $15 million

Inferno (alternatively known as Desert Heat) is a 1999 American action thriller film directed by John G. Avildsen, and starring Jean-Claude Van Damme, Danny Trejo, Pat Morita, Gabrielle Fitzpatrick, and David "Shark" Fralick. It was the last film directed by Avildsen before his death in 2017.

The plot revolves around depressed military veteran Eddie Lomax (Van Damme), who wanders the desert looking for a reason to die. An incident with a few thugs from a nearby town, who steal Eddie's motorbike and beat him almost to death, sets him on a path of revenge. The film is loosely based on the 1961 Japanese samurai film Yojimbo by Akira Kurosawa.

== Plot ==
Eddie Lomax rides an Indian motorcycle in a salt flat. When his bike breaks down, he begins drinking and passes out. When he awakes, he sees his old friend from the Army, Johnny Sixtos. Eddie tells Johnny he is haunted by dreams of atrocities they committed in the Army, and intends to kill himself after giving Johnny his Indian motorcycle. However, Eddie begins shooting rounds randomly, and one hits a passing truck. Three brothers stop and begin harassing Eddie, and Johnny disappears. They beat and shoot Eddie, leaving the youngest brother Petey to execute him, though he shoots the ground, and steal his bike.

Johnny reappears and carries Eddie to his home, where he nurses him back to health. Once recovered, Eddie sets off to avenge himself and retrieve the motorcycle. In town, he finds his gun has been sold to a local store. Eddie kills the two men inside when they attack him, and frees their uncle Eli Hamilton whom they had been keeping prisoner in a back room to let him die out. Eli supplies Eddie with guns and ammunition. Eddie then goes to the local diner, where he meets Rhonda Reynolds, another friend of Johnny's. There he learns the identity of the three men who attacked him, and employs diner regular Jubal Early to clean up the bodies of the men he killed at Eli's.

After learning from Eli and Jubal that the Hogan brothers, (the men who attacked him) work with a local gang called the Heathens, Eddie sets off to the Bomb Bay Cafe to confront them. After killing three more men and rescuing two women, Eddie tells the Heathens that the Hogans hired him. At his hotel, the two women insist on thanking Eddie with sex. At a meeting that night, the Heathens conclude that the Hogans have betrayed them by hiring Eddie, and set out to ambush the Hogans and their father. The Hogans, in turn, attack the Heathens, and Eddie contributes to the chaos by causing several large explosions during their battle. Johnny reappears, however, and draws attention away from Eddie. After an unsuccessful lynching, Eddie manages to escape with Johnny.

Rhonda and Eddie are devastated when Johnny does not recover from his injuries, and resolve to avenge him. Back in town, Eddie appears to return to his hotel room, and the Heathens and Hogans, realizing Eddie has played them against one another unite to kill him. Eddie, Eli, Rhonda, and Jubal booby-trap his room, however, and Eddie systematically kills most of the gang. When only Matt Hogan remains, he and Eddie duel. Once Matt gets the upper hand, several citizens shoot Matt, and argue over who truly killed him.

Afterwards, there is peace in town, and Eddie leaks a story to the newspaper about UFOs causing 28 "disappearances" in town. This brings tourism and prosperity to the town, and he rides off with Rhonda and a vision of Johnny alongside.

== Cast ==
- Jean-Claude Van Damme as Eddie Lomax
- Danny Trejo as Johnny Sixtos
- Pat Morita as Jubal Early
- Gabrielle Fitzpatrick as Rhonda Reynolds
- Larry Drake as Ramsey Hogan
- Vincent Schiavelli as Mr. Singh
- David "Shark" Fralick as Matt Hogan
- Silas Weir Mitchell as Jesse Hogan
- Jonathan Avildsen as Petey Hogan
- Lee Tergesen as Luke
- Jaime Pressly as Dottie Matthews
- Bill Erwin as Eli Hamilton
- Ford Rainey as Pop Reynolds
- Kevin West as Vern
- Robert Symonds as Henry Howard
- Priscilla Pointer as Mrs. Howard
- Evelyn Guerrero as Bertie Early
- Lisa McCullough as Irma
- Nikki Bokal as Carol Delvecchio
- Kelly Ewing as Rose Delvecchio
- Ray Chang as Mr. Chang
- Steve Adell as Joe Bob
- Ed Trotta as Jack
- Paul Koslo as Ives
- Brett Harrelson as Buck
- Jeff Kober as Beserko
- Gregory Scott Cummins as Leon
- Neil Delama as Lester

== Production ==
=== Filming ===
Variety reported that filming started in June 1998 and had a planned schedule of eight weeks. The original cut of the film was known as Coyote Moon. Jean-Claude Van Damme did not like this cut and had the film recut. John G. Avildsen unsuccessfully attempted to have his name removed from the film.

== Release ==
=== Home media ===
On July 1, 2002 DVD was released by Columbia TriStar Home Video at the UK in Region 2.

On September 20, 2010 Jean-Claude Van Damme’s ten movie collection DVD was released; including nine action films they were: No Retreat, No Surrender, Nowhere to Run, Hard Target, Street Fighter, Sudden Death, The Quest, Double Team, Knock Off and Universal Soldier: The Return.

== Reception ==
=== Critical response ===
Larry Powell and Tom Garrett wrote in The Films of John G. Avildsen that "reviews were scarce and the few that did get published were cruel." Rotten Tomatoes, a review aggregator, reports that 0% of five surveyed critics gave the film a positive review; the average rating was 3/10.

Dragon's Domain Records praised Bill Conti's musical score as "a hard-hitting mix of country and blues rock and roll, keyboard synthesizers, a delicate love theme for acoustic guitar, and some compelling mystical music associated with what remained of the Native Indian subplot. These elements come together in a lengthy, climactic showdown of furious intensity and motivic interaction which culminates the film in a wild melee of body slams, bone-crunching kicks, and staccato gunplay".
