= Punch and Jody =

1974 American television film

- Genre: Drama
- Written by: John McGreevey
- Directed by: Barry Shear
- Starring: Glenn Ford; Pam Griffin
- Theme music composer: Fred Karlin
- Country of origin: United States
- Original language: English

Production
- Producers: Douglas Benton; Richard Berg
- Cinematography: Robert C. Moreno
- Editor: John A. Martinelli
- Running time: 90 minutes
- Production companies: Metromedia Productions; Stonehenge Productions (in association with)

Original release
- Network: NBC
- Release: November 6, 1974

Punch and Jody is a 1974 NBC TV movie starring Glenn Ford and directed by Barry Shear.

== Synopsis ==
It is the story of a cruel man who abandons his wife and daughter and goes to work in a circus around the country. Years later he meets his daughter, who is now a rambling gypsy.

== Cast ==
Actor	Role
Glenn Ford	Punch Travers
Pam Griffin	Jody Travers
Kathleen Widdoes	Margaret
Pat Morita	Takahasi
Cynthia Hayward	Aurora
Parley Baer	Dan
Susan Brown	Jen
Mel Stewart	Woody
Don "Red" Barry	Franz
Peter Ford	Bus-Driver
