= Ohara (TV series) =

American TV police procedural series (1987–1988)

- Pat Morita as Ohara
- Genre: Police procedural
- Created by: Michael Braveman; John A. Kuri; Pat Morita
- Developed by: Ronald M. Cohen
- Starring: Pat Morita; Kevin Conroy; Jon Polito; Rachel Ticotin
- Composer: Bill Conti
- Country of origin: United States
- Original language: English
- No. of seasons: 2
- No. of episodes: 30

Production
- Executive producers: Brian Grazer; Hal Sitowitz; Tony Wharmby; Roderick Taylor
- Producers: Skip Ward; Ralph Riskin
- Running time: 60 minutes
- Production companies: Imagine Television; M'ass Production.; Warner Bros. Television

Original release
- Network: ABC
- Release: January 17, 1987 – May 7, 1988

Ohara is an American police procedural television series that first aired on the ABC television network from January 17, 1987 until August 6, 1988, starring Pat Morita in the title role of Lt. Ohara. Morita also co-created the series along with Michael Braveman and John A. Kuri. Kevin Conroy, Jon Polito, Rachel Ticotin, and Robert Clohessy also starred in supporting roles. The series was notable for being one of the first television series to have a Japanese-American actor in the leading role.

== Premise ==
=== Original ===
The series focuses on an unconventional Los Angeles-based Japanese-American police lieutenant named Ohara (Pat Morita) who uses spirituality methods such as meditation in his home shrine to solve crimes without the use of a gun or a partner, although he would use martial arts if necessary. He often talked in the form of epigrams.

=== Revised version ===
A change in format left Ohara as the only returning character in the fall of 1987. He was paired with a partner named Lt. George Shaver (Robert Clohessy) who was a more conventional cop, and they worked as part of a task force headed by Teresa Storm.

=== Final version ===
In February 1988, after a friend was murdered, Ohara and Shaver became frustrated with the law-enforcement establishment. They resigned and became private detectives.

== Main cast ==
- Pat Morita as Lt. Ohara

Season 1

- Kevin Conroy as Capt. Lloyd Hamilton (episodes 1-7)
- Jon Polito as Capt. Ross (March–May 1987) (episodes 8-11)
- Madge Sinclair as Gussie Lemmons
- Catherine Keener as Lt. Cricket Sideris
- Richard Yniguez as Det. Jesse Guerrera

Season 2

- Robert Clohessy as Lt. George Shaver
- Rachel Ticotin as Assistant District Attorney Teresa Stormepisode 1-13
- Meagen Fay as Roxy-episode 1-13
- Bruce Beatty as Grillo

== Notable guest stars ==
- Brandon Lee appeared in the Season 2 episode "What's in a Name" which first aired on January 23, 1988 as Kenji, the evil son of a yakuza godfather. This was Lee's first and only appearance in a television series and his only acting role as a villain, although in Kung Fu: The Movie, his character was possessed and forced to be evil for most of the movie.
- Other guest stars in the series included Michael Des Barres, Nana Visitor, Mitch Pileggi, Benicio del Toro, Shannon Tweed, and Eve McVeagh.

== Episodes list ==
=== Season 1 (1987) ===
No. overall	No. in season	Title	Directed by	Written by	Original release date
1	1	"Pilot"	E.W. Swackhamer	Richard Christian Danus	January 17, 1987
2	2	"Eddie"	E.W. Swackhamer	Richard Danus	January 24, 1987
3	3	"Darryl"	E.W. Swackhamer	Bill D'Arvay (story); Bill D'Arvay and Daniel Freudenberger (teleplay)	January 31, 1987
4	4	"Will"	E.W. Swackhamer	Paul F. Edwards and Howard Friedland & Ken Peragine (story); Paul F. Edwards (teleplay)	February 7, 1987
5	5	"Toshi"	Jackie Cooper	Len Mlodinow & Scott Rubenstein & John Wells (story); John Wells (teleplay)	February 14, 1987
6	6	"Terry"	Jerry Jameson	Richard Danus & Daniel Freudberger & Hal Sitowitz	February 21, 1987
7	7	"Louie"	Jerry Jameson	Hal Sitowitz	March 7, 1987
8	8	"Laura"	E.W. Swackhamer	Bill Bleich	March 14, 1987
9	9	"Jesse"	Jerry Jameson	Michael Marks	March 21, 1987
10	10	"Frannie"	E.W. Swackhammer	Paul F. Edwards	March 28, 1987
11	11	"Brian"	Jerry Jameson	Johnathan Glasner	April 4, 1987

=== Season 2 (1987–88) ===
No. overall	No. in season	Title	Directed by	Written by	Original release date
12	1	"'Y' Wanna Live Forever?"	Tony Wharmby	Ronald M. Cohen	October 3, 1987
13	2	"Artful Dodgers"	Tony Wharmby	Robert McCullough	October 10, 1987
14	3	"The Sparrow"	Bruce Kessler	Linda Elstad	October 24, 1987
15	4	"Fagin All Over Again"	Robert Sweeney	Rama Blum	November 7, 1987
16	5	"Take the Money and Run"	Bruce Kessler	Robert McCullough & Joseph Gunn	November 14, 1987
17	6	"The Intruders"	Colin Bucksey	Joseph Gunn	November 21, 1987
18	7	"Hot Rocks"	Tony Wharmby	Robert McCullough & Joseph Gunn	December 5, 1987
19	8	"And a Child Shall Lead Them"	Bruce Kessler	Joseph Gunn & Robert McCullough	December 12, 1987
20	9	"Silver in the Hills"	Michael Caffey	Joseph Gunn & Robert McCullough	December 19, 1987
21	10	"They Shoot Witnesses, Don't They?"	Don Chaffey	Rama Blum	January 2, 1988
22	11	"You Bet Your Life"	Dale White	David Braff	January 16, 1988
23	12	"What's in a Name?"	Tony Wharmby	Jerome Lew	January 23, 1988
Brandon Lee appears in this episode.
24	13	"Sign of the Times"	Dale White	David Braff & Joseph Gunn & Robert McCullough	January 30, 1988
25	14	"The Light Around the Body"	Tony Wharmby	Roderick Taylor & Bruce A. Taylor & Jeff Mandel	February 6, 1988
Last episode to feature Rachel Ticotin and Meagen Fay. Ohara and Shaver quit the force to become private eyes at the end of the episode.
26	15	"X"	Richard C. Sarafian	Story by : Roderick Taylor & William Mickelberry; Teleplay by : William Mickelberry	March 5, 1988
27	16	"Last Year's Model"	Bradford May	Story by : Roderick Taylor & Bruce A. Taylor & Jeff Mandel; Teleplay by : Jeff Mandel & Bruce A. Taylor	March 12, 1988
28	17	"Open Season"	Richard C. Sarafian	Story by : Roderick Taylor & Bruce A. Taylor & Jeff Mandel; Teleplay by : Bruce A. Taylor & Jeff Mandel	March 26, 1988
29	18	"Seeing Something That Isn't There"	Bradford May	Story by : Roderick Taylor & Bruce A. Taylor & Jeff Mandel; Teleplay by : Jeff Mandel & Bruce A. Taylor	April 30, 1988
30	19	"Hot Spell"	Unknown	Unknown	May 7, 1988

== Format changes and cancellation ==
Following its premiere, the show was not attracting the audience ABC had hoped for. They put it through several format changes to increase the ratings. The first major change was to change title character Ohara from a lieutenant to a federal police officer; he was also paired with a partner. Later on in the season Ohara became a more conventional cop using a gun to assist him in his investigations. The second season had a final format change in which Ohara and his partner were turned into private investigators. These changes failed to improve the show's declining ratings and the show was cancelled after the second season.
