= Louise Sorel =

American actress (born 1940)

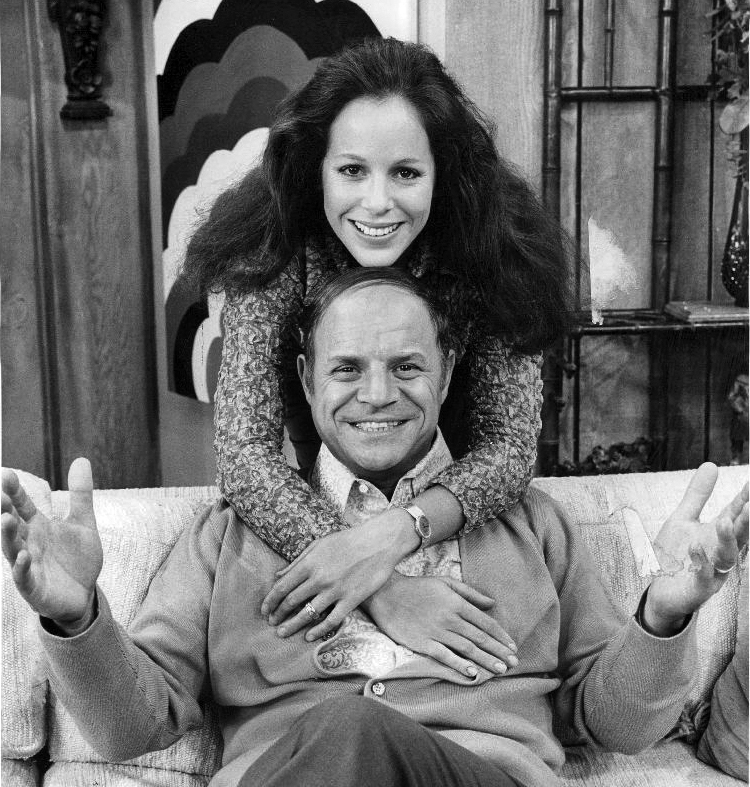
- Don Rickles and Louise Sorel in 1971
- Born: Louise Jacqueline Cohen; August 6, 1940 (age 86); Los Angeles, California, U.S.
- Occupation: Actress
- Years active: 1957–present
- Spouses: Herb Edelman (m. 1964; div. 1970) Ken Howard (m. 1973; div. 1975)

Louise Jacqueline Sorel (née Cohen; born August 6, 1940) is an American actress. She played Vivian Alamain in the American soap opera Days of Our Lives from 1992–2000, 2009–2011, 2017–2018, 2020, 2023 and 2025–present. She has also played Augusta Lockridge on Santa Barbara from 1984–1991 and Emily Tanner on Beacon Hill since 2014.

== Early life ==
Sorel was born Louise Jacqueline Cohen in Los Angeles, California on August 6, 1940. Her parents were Albert J. Cohen, a film producer, and Jeanne (née Sorel), a concert pianist. Sorel is Jewish.

Sorel received theatrical training at the Neighborhood Playhouse School of the Theatre in New York. She briefly attended the Institut Français, where she studied French. She began performing on stage when she was 15 years old.

== Career ==
Sorel's early career was on the stage; she spent several years on Broadway, playing roles in Take Her, She's Mine and Man and Boy. She appeared in stage productions of The Lion in Winter and The Sign in Sidney Brustein's Window.

Sorel's first film role was a cameo appearance in the 1957 film Eighteen and Anxious. She went on to appear in The Party's Over (1965), Plaza Suite (1971), an episode of Night Gallery titled "Pickman's Model" (1971), B.S. I Love You (1971), Every Little Crook and Nanny (1972), The Return of Charlie Chan (1973), Airplane II: The Sequel (1982), Mazes and Monsters (1982), Where the Boys Are '84 (1984), and Crimes of Passion (1984), among others. Sorel has made guest appearances on more than 50 prime-time programs and TV movies, including Star Trek (as "Rayna", in the episode "Requiem for Methuselah", which aired in 1969). She also portrayed Terry Waverly, the sister-in-law of Dr. Richard Kimble, in an episode of The Fugitive in 1965.

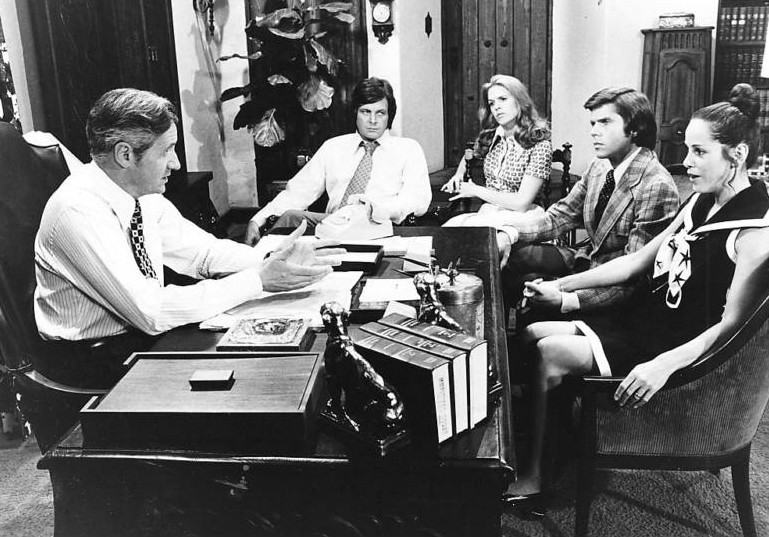
From left: Arthur Hill, Michael Witney, Sharon Gless, John Davidson and Sorel on ABC's Owen Marshall, Counselor at Law (1972)

She made other guest appearances on such programs as Bonanza (as Marie in the episode "The Strange One", 1965), Daniel Boone, The Virginian, Night Gallery, Route 66, The Big Valley, The Fugitive, Search (as Magda Reiner, in "Live Men Tell Tales"), Vega$, Hart to Hart, Medical Center, Charlie's Angels, The Incredible Hulk, Hawaii Five-O, The Eddie Capra Mysteries, Knots Landing, and Sabrina the Teenage Witch, among others. She had a principal role on The Don Rickles Show.

Sorel played fan-favorite character Augusta Lockridge on the NBC daytime drama series Santa Barbara from July 1984 to August 1986, then from November 1988 to May 1989, returning the following October. She remained until October 1991.

In between stints, she also spent a year appearing as a strong-willed but decent District Attorney, Judith Russell Sanders, on the ABC soap opera One Life to Live, from August 1986 through November 1987. She played the villainous Vivian Alamain on the NBC daytime serial, Days of Our Lives from March 1992 until February 2000. Sorel's performance as Alamain garnered her five Soap Opera Digest Awards, including "Outstanding Villainess" in 1994 and "Outstanding Showstopper" in 1997 and 1999.

In 2000, shortly after her dismissal from Days of Our Lives, Sorel briefly joined the cast of the Port Charles as fashion maven "Donatella Stewart" (a play on the names Donatella Versace and Martha Stewart). The role lasted for a month. In 2001, she had a brief role on another ABC soap opera, All My Children, as Judge Kay Campobello, who blackmailed Adam Chandler into sleeping with her. She made a brief appearance on Passions as cannery worker Dort in 2004. In December 2009, she was invited to reprise her villainous role on Days of Our Lives.

In June 2011, Sorel was let go from Days of Our Lives along with many other actors to make room for the return of super couple John and Marlena and several other characters. In 2014, Sorel played Emily Tanner in the soap opera web series Beacon Hill.

On December 29, 2017, Sorel returned to Days of Our Lives as Vivian. However, she was briefly replaced by Robin Strasser. On December 30, 2019, it was announced that Sorel would once again return to the role in 2020.

In 2023 Sorel returned to her role as Vivian Alamain in Days of Our Lives, and again in 2025.

== Filmography ==
=== Film ===
| Year | Title | Role | Notes |
|---|---|---|---|
| 1957 | Eighteen and Anxious | | as Jacqueline Sorel |
| 1965 | The Party's Over | Melina | |
| 1971 | B.S. I Love You | Ruth | |
| 1971 | Plaza Suite | Jean McCormack | |
| 1972 | Every Little Crook and Nanny | Marie | |
| 1982 | Airplane II: The Sequel | Nurse | |
| 1984 | Where the Boys Are | Barbara Roxbury | |
| 1984 | Crimes of Passion | Claudia | |

=== Television ===
| Year | Title | Role | Notes |
|---|---|---|---|
| 1962 | Naked City | Girl #1 | Season 3 Episode 25: "Lament for a Dead Indian" |
| 1962 | The Laughmakers | Joyce | TV Movie |
| 1963 | The Doctors | Rose Finelli | Season 1 Episode 49: "The Faint Heart Never Wins" |
| 1963 | Route 66 | Ella | Season 4 Episode 5: "Build Your Houses with Their Backs to the Sea" |
| 1963 | The Defenders | Margie Spencer | Season 3 Episode 5: "Conspiracy of Silence" |
| 1964 | Espionage | Annie Layton | Season 1 Episode 24: "A Tiny Drop of Poison" |
| 1965 | Dr. Kildare | Eloisa Ruiz | Season 4 Episode 20: "A Marriage of Convenience" |
| 1965 | The Fugitive | Terry Waverly | Season 2 Episode 23: "The Survivors" |
| 1965 | The Nurses | Janet Hazen | Season 3 Episode 27: "A39846" |
| 1965 | Bonanza | Marie | Season 7 Episode 10: "The Strange One" |
| 1965 | The Virginian | Eleni Niarcos | Season 4 Episode 11: "The Dream of Stavros Karas" |
| 1966 | The Trials of O'Brien | Sally Cutler | Season 1 Episode 19: "The Partridge Papers" |
| 1966 | Run for Your Life | Elizabeth Brentano | Season 1 Episode 27: "Night Train from Chicago" |
| 1966 | Hawk | Melissa Grant | Season 1 Episode 1: "Do Not Mutilate or Spindle" |
| 1966 | Iron Horse | Jez Santeen | Season 1 Episode 3: "High Devil" |
| 1966 | The Big Valley | Pilon | Season 2 Episode 14: "Hide the Children" |
| 1967 | Occasional Wife | Ellen Hanley | Season 1 Episode 18: "A Couple of Home-Cooked Meals" |
| 1967 | The Flying Nun | Binkie Worsley | Season 1 Episode 4: "A Bell for San Tanco" |
| 1967 | Daniel Boone | Susanna | Season 4 Episode 5: "Beaumarchais" |
| 1967 | I Spy | Stephanie | Season 3 Episode 8: "Red Sash of Courage" |
| 1968 | The Rat Patrol | Gabrielle | Season 2 Episode 18: "The Fatal Reunion Raid" |
| 1968 | Mannix | Danielle Michaels | Season 1 Episode 22: "Delayed Action" |
| 1968 | The Name of the Game | Marie Furneaux | Season 1 Episode 11: "The White Birch" |
| 1969 | Star Trek | Rayna Kapec | Episode: "Requiem for Methuselah" |
| 1969 | Mr. Deeds Goes to Town | Kate | Season 1 Episode 1: "Pilot" |
| 1969 | The Survivors | Jean Vale | 4 episodes |
| 1969–1982 | Insight | Janet / Anna | 2 episodes |
| 1970 | The Bold Ones: The Protectors | Nina Bruno | Season 1 Episode 4: "The Carrier" |
| 1970–1971 | Night Gallery | Velia Redford (segment: "The Dead Man") / Mavis Goldsmith (segment: "Pickman's Model") | 2 episodes |
| 1971 | The Bold Ones: The Senator | Mary Deurivieres | Season 1 Episode 7: "George Washington Told a Lie" |
| 1971 | River of Mystery | Elena | TV Movie |
| 1971–1975 | Medical Center | Miriam / Louise Morgan / Isabella / Ellen Morley / Jessica Lambert | 6 episodes |
| 1972 | The Don Rickles Show | Barbara Robinson | Series regular |
| 1972 | Owen Marshall, Counselor at Law | Julie Shaw | Season 2 Episode 3: "Libel Is a Dirty Word" |
| 1972 | Search | Magda Reiner | Season 1 Episode 5: "Live Men Tell Tales" |
| 1972 | Banacek | Alicia Danato | Season 1 Episode 3: "No Sign of the Cross" |
| 1972 | The F.B.I. | Linda Gregson | Season 8 Episode 11: "Canyon of No Return" |
| 1972 | Every Man Needs One | Louise Lathrop | TV Movie |
| 1973 | The Return of Charlie Chan | Ariane Hadrachi | a.k.a. Happiness Is a Warm Clue; TV Movie |
| 1973 | Ghost Story | Nisa King | Season 1 Episode 21: "The Ghost of Potter's Field" |
| 1973 | The President's Plane Is Missing | Joanna Spencer | TV Movie |
| 1973 | Ironside | Patricia Moore | Season 7 Episode 9: "Mind for Murder" |
| 1973 | Hawaii Five-O | Diane Foxton | Season 6 Episode 13: "Try to Die on Time" |
| 1974 | Get Christie Love | Helena Varga | TV Movie |
| 1974 | The Girl Who Came Gift-Wrapped | Sylvia | TV Movie |
| 1974 | The Healers | | TV Movie |
| 1974 | The Wide World of Mystery | Claire | Season 1 Episode 37: "Nightmare Step" |
| 1974 | The Mark of Zorro | Inez Quintero | TV Movie |
| 1974–1977 | Kojak | Vicky Brewer / Janice Maclay | 3 episodes |
| 1975 | Perilous Voyage | Alicia Salazar | TV Movie |
| 1975 | One of Our Own | Carole Simon | a.k.a. The Week of Fear; TV Movie |
| 1975 | Doctors' Hospital | Carole Simon | Season 1 Episode 0: "One of Our Own" |
| 1975 | Barbary Coast | Abigail McKay | Season 1 Episode 8: "An Iron-Clad Plan" |
| 1976 | Widow | Vivian | TV Movie |
| 1976 | Bronk | Irene | Season 1 Episode 22: "The Ordeal" |
| 1977 | Quincy M.E. | Harriet Crawford | Season 2 Episode 7: "Has Anybody Here Seen Quincy?" |
| 1977 | 3 Girls 3 | Steve's Girlfriend | Season 1 Episode 2: "Steve Martin" |
| 1977 | Rosetti and Ryan | Grace Pickering | Season 1 Episode 2: "The Ten-Second Client" |
| 1978 | When Every Day Was the Fourth of July | Millie Cooper | TV Movie |
| 1979 | Vega$ | Jackie | Season 1 Episode 19: "Doubtful Target" |
| 1979 | The Curse of Dracula | Amanda Gibbons | Season 1 Episode 7: "Where Angels Fear to Tread" |
| 1979 | Charlie's Angels | Lily Burton | Season 4 Episode 6: "Caged Angel" |
| 1979 | The Incredible Hulk | Dr. Renee DuBois | Season 3 Episode 10: "Babalao" |
| 1980 | Hagen | Petra | Season 1 Episode 6: "Nightmare" |
| 1980 | One in a Million | Grace Cushing | 3 episodes |
| 1980–1981 | Ladies' Man | Elaine Holstein | Series regular |
| 1982 | Magnum, P.I. | Eleanor Greeley | Season 2 Episode 16: "One More Summer" |
| 1982 | Hart to Hart | Pat Yankee | Season 3 Episode 16: "Blue and Broken-Harted" |
| 1982 | Trapper John, M.D. | Marty Katz | Season 3 Episode 22: "A Piece of the Action" |
| 1982 | Knots Landing | Bess Riker | 3 episodes |
| 1982 | Mazes and Monsters | Julia | TV Movie |
| 1982–1984 | Simon & Simon | Mrs. Sylvia Ross / Carla Morgan | 2 episodes |
| 1983 | Diff'rent Strokes | Robin Saunders | Season 5 Episode 14: "Parents Have Rights, Too" |
| 1983 | Sunset Limousine | Dolores Chase | TV Movie |
| 1983 | Oh Madeline | Sandy | Season 1 Episode 8: "Chances Are" |
| 1984 | Matt Houston | Barbara Daniels | Season 3 Episode 3: "Eyewitness" |
| 1984–1991 | Santa Barbara | Augusta Lockridge | Series regular 497 episodes |
| 1986 | A Masterpiece of Murder | Louise | TV Movie |
| 1986–1987 | One Life to Live | Judith Sanders | 4 episodes |
| 1992–2000, 2009–2011, 2017–2018, 2020, 2023, 2025–present | Days of Our Lives | Vivian Alamain | Series regular 1070 episodes |
| 1994 | Winter Heat | Vivian Alamain | TV Movie |
| 1996 | Law & Order | Marcy Fletcher Wrightman | Season 7 Episode 1: "Causa Mortis" |
| 1998 | Sabrina the Teenage Witch | Mrs. Saberhagen | Season 2 Episode 26: "Mom vs. Magic" |
| 2000 | Port Charles | Donatella Stewart | 14 episodes |
| 2001 | All My Children | Judge Kay Campobello | 7 episodes |
| 2004 | Passions | Dort | 6 episodes |
| 2014–2020 | Beacon Hill | Emily Tanner | 8 episodes |

== Awards ==
| Year | Award | Category | Work | Result |
|---|---|---|---|---|
| 1986 | 3rd Soap Opera Digest Award | Outstanding Comic Relief Role on a Daytime Serial | Santa Barbara | Nominated |
| 1986 | 3rd Soap Opera Digest Award | Outstanding Actress in a Supporting Role on a Daytime Serial | Santa Barbara | Nominated |
| 1993 | 9th Soap Opera Digest Award | Outstanding Villain/Villainess | Days of Our Lives | Nominated |
| 1994 | 10th Soap Opera Digest Award | Outstanding Villain/Villainess | Days of our Lives | Won |
| 1995 | 11th Soap Opera Digest Award | Outstanding Female Scene Stealer | Days of our Lives | Won |
| 1996 | 12th Soap Opera Digest Award | Outstanding Actress in a Supporting Role | Days of our Lives | Won |
| 1997 | 13th Soap Opera Digest Award | Outstanding Female Showstopper | Days of our Lives | Won |
| 1999 | 15th Soap Opera Digest Award | Outstanding Female Scene Stealer | Days of our Lives | Won |
