= The Return of Charlie Chan =

1973 American television film

- Also known as: Happiness Is a Warm Clue
- Genre: Crime; Drama; Mystery
- Written by: Gene R. Kearney; Earl Derr Biggers; Simon Last
- Directed by: Daryl Duke; Leslie H. Martinson
- Starring: Ross Martin; Richard Haydn; Louise Sorel; Leslie Nielsen; Don Gordon; Kathleen Widdoes
- Music by: Robert Prince
- Country of origin: United States
- Original language: English

Production
- Executive producer: John J. Cole
- Producer: Jack Laird
- Production locations: Vancouver, British Columbia; Universal Studios - 100 Universal City Plaza, Universal City, California
- Cinematography: Richard C. Glouner
- Editor: Frank Morriss
- Running time: 91 minutes
- Production companies: The Charlie Chan Company; Universal Television

Original release
- Network: ABC
- Release: July 17, 1973

The Return of Charlie Chan (also known as Happiness Is a Warm Clue) is a 1973 American television film. It was directed by Daryl Duke and stars Ross Martin, Richard Haydn, Louise Sorel, and Leslie Nielsen.

== Plot ==
Charlie Chan investigates a murder case aboard the yacht of a wealthy Greek shipping tycoon.

== Cast ==
- Ross Martin as Charlie Chan
- Richard Haydn as Andrew Kidder
- Louise Sorel as Ariane Hadrachi
- Joseph Hindy as Paul Hadrachi
- Kathleen Widdoes as Irene Hadrachi
- Don Gordon as Lambert
- Peter Donat as Noel Adamson
- Leslie Nielsen as Alexander Hadrachi

== See also ==
- List of American films of 1973
