= Nice Dreams (album) =

Studio album by Coke Weed
- Released: April 17, 2012
- Genre: Indie rock, neo-psychedelia
- Length: 48:16
- Label: Heavy Friends

Coke Weed chronology
Coke Weed Volume One (2011)	Nice Dreams (2012)	Back to Soft (2013)

Nice Dreams is the second album by psychedelic rock band Coke Weed. It was released on April 17, 2012. It was recorded in Bar Harbor, Maine and produced by Nick Stumpf.

== Track listing ==
All songs copyright Milan McAlevey.

1. "Pure Pattern" - 5:12
2. "Sister Springs" - 3:38
3. "Magpie" - 4:28
4. "Jimmy" - 3:31
5. "Kid" - 3:48
6. "Golden Apples" - 5:14
7. "Someone So Young" - 6:38
8. "King of the Night" - 6:01
9. "No Poem" - 4:35
10. "Gangland" - 5:11

== Personnel ==
Coke Weed

- Nina Donghia - vocals
- Milan McAlevey - guitar, vocals
- Caleb Davis - guitar, backing vocals
- Zach Soares - bass
- Peter Cuffari - drums, and percussion

Additional Musicians

- Emily Henry - trombone on "Someone So Young"
