= Pat Morita =

American actor and comedian (1932–2005)

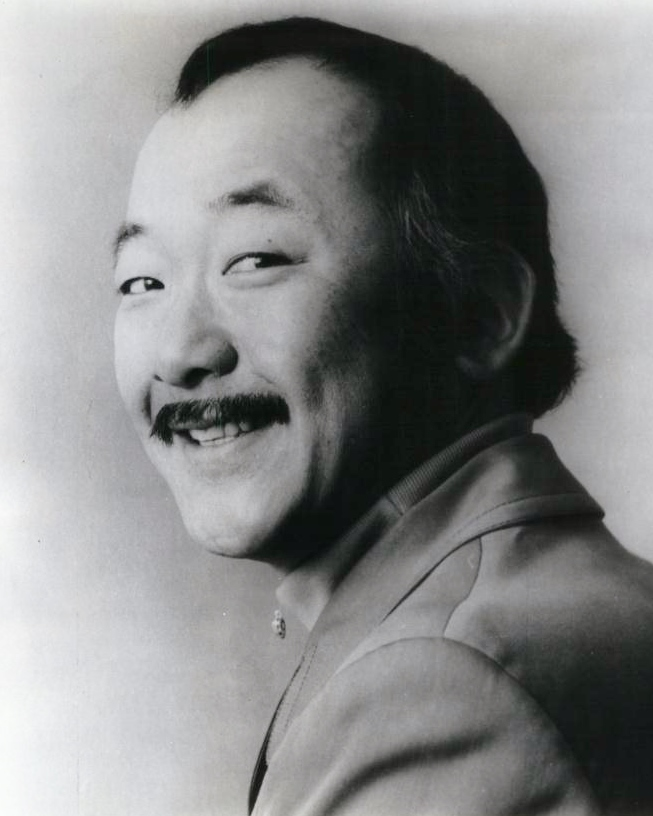
- Morita in 1971
- Born: Patrick Noriyuki Morita; June 28, 1932; Sacramento, California, U.S.
- Died: November 24, 2005 (aged 73); Las Vegas, Nevada, U.S.
- Occupations: Actor; comedian
- Years active: 1962–2005
- Spouses: Kathleen Yamachi (m. 1953; div. 1967); Yukiye Kitahara (m. 1970; div. 1989); Evelyn Guerrero (m. 1994)
- Children: 3

Noriyuki "Pat" Morita (June 28, 1932 – November 24, 2005) was an American actor and comedian. He began his career as a stand-up comedian, before becoming known to television audiences for his recurring role as diner owner Matsuo "Arnold" Takahashi on the sitcom series Happy Days from 1975 to 1983. Morita was subsequently nominated for an Academy Award for Best Supporting Actor for his portrayal of martial arts mentor Mr. Miyagi in The Karate Kid (1984), which would be the first of a media franchise in which Morita was the central player.

Morita was the series lead actor in the television program Mr. T and Tina and in Ohara, a police-themed drama. The two shows made history for being among the few TV shows with an Asian-American series lead. He also played recurring or featured roles as Captain Sam Pak on M*A*S*H, Ah Chew in Sanford and Son, and Mike Woo on The Mystery Files of Shelby Woo. Morita was the voice of The Emperor of China in the Disney animated film Mulan (1998), and its sequel Mulan II (2004).

Aside from his 1985 Oscar nod, Morita was twice nominated for Golden Globe Awards (Best Supporting Actor – Motion Picture for The Karate Kid and Best Supporting Actor – Series, Miniseries or Television Film for the made-for-television film Amos), and an Emmy Award (also for Amos). In 1994, he received a star on the Hollywood Walk of Fame for his contributions to the motion picture industry. In 2015, Morita was inducted into the Martial Arts History Museum Hall of Fame.

== Early life ==
Morita was born on June 28, 1932, in Isleton, California, to Japanese immigrants. His father, Tamaru, born in 1897, immigrated to California from Kumamoto Prefecture on the Japanese island of Kyushu in 1915. Tamaru's wife, Momoe, born in 1903, immigrated to California in 1913. Noriyuki, as Pat was named, had a brother named Hideo (Harry) who was 12 years older.

Morita developed spinal tuberculosis (Pott disease) at age two and spent the bulk of the next nine years in the Weimar Institute in Weimar, California, and later at the Shriners Hospital in San Francisco. For long periods, he was wrapped in a full-body cast and was told that he would never walk. During his time at a sanatorium near Sacramento, Morita befriended a visiting priest who would often joke that, if Morita ever converted to Catholicism, the priest would rename him to "Patrick Aloysius Ignatius Xavier Noriyuki Morita." Released from the hospital at age 11 after undergoing extensive spinal surgery and learning how to walk, Morita was transported from the hospital directly to the Gila River camp in Arizona to join his interned family. After about a year and a half, Morita was transferred to the Tule Lake War Relocation Center.

After World War II ended, Morita moved back to the Bay Area and he graduated from Armijo High School in Fairfield, California, in 1949. For a time after the war, the family operated Ariake Chop Suey, a restaurant in Sacramento, California, jokingly described by Morita years later as "a Japanese family running a Chinese restaurant in a black neighborhood with a clientele of blacks, Filipinos and everybody else who didn't fit in any of the other neighborhoods". Morita would entertain customers with jokes and serve as master of ceremonies for group dinners. After Morita's father was killed in 1956 by a hit-and-run driver while walking home from an all-night movie, Morita and his mother kept the restaurant going for another three or four years. Needing a regular job to support his wife and a newly born child, Morita became a data processor in the early 1960s with the Department of Motor Vehicles and other state agencies, graduating to a graveyard shift job at Aerojet General. In due time, he was a department head at another aerospace firm, Lockheed, handling the liaison between the engineers and the programmers who were mapping out lunar eclipses for Polaris and Titan missile projects.

However, Morita suffered from occupational burnout and decided to quit his job and try show business. He began working as a stand-up comedian at small clubs in Sacramento as well as San Francisco, taking the stage name "Pat Morita," in part due to the presence of comedians including Pat Henry and Pat Cooper, in addition due to memories of the priest he had befriended as a boy. Morita struggled for many years in comedy, until fellow performer—ventriloquist Hank Garcia—told him to try his luck in Los Angeles. Sally Marr, Lenny Bruce's mother, acted as his agent and manager after he moved to Los Angeles, and booked him in the San Fernando Valley and at the Horn nightclub in Santa Monica. Morita sometimes worked as the opening act for singers Vic Damone and Connie Stevens and for his mentor, the comedian Redd Foxx. Morita used the nickname "The Hip Nip."

Despite having some Japanese-speaking roles throughout his acting career, Morita himself hardly spoke the language fluently, as he and his family primarily used English at home as his native language, making him isolated from his Japanese-speaking relatives and peers, especially his parents who were immigrants.

== Television and film career ==
=== Early work ===
Morita's first movie roles were as a henchman in Thoroughly Modern Millie (1967) and a similar role in The Shakiest Gun in the West (1968), starring Don Knotts. He also appeared in the fourth episode of the 1st season of The Courtship of Eddie's Father (1969) and in the first episode of the second season of Columbo (1972). Morita had other notable recurring television roles on Sanford and Son (1974–1976) as Ah Chew, a good-natured friend of Lamont Sanford, and as South Korean Army Captain Sam Pak on the sitcom M*A*S*H (1973, 1974). He was also cast as Rear Admiral Ryunosuke Kusaka in the war film Midway (1976).

=== Happy Days ===
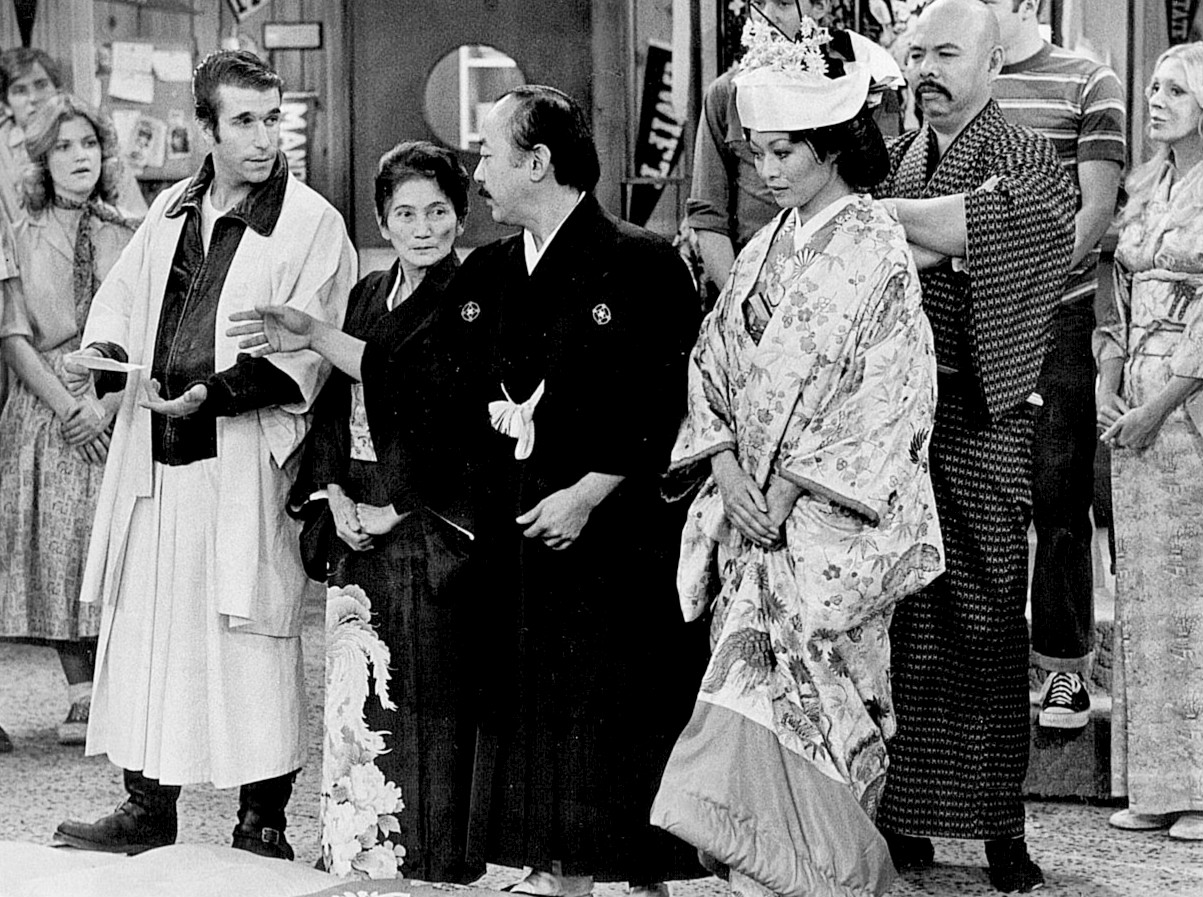
Photo of Arnold's wedding from Happy Days. Arnold asks Fonzie (Henry Winkler) to be his best man at his traditional Japanese wedding ceremony.

Morita had a recurring role in the mid-1970s on Happy Days as Matsuo "Arnold" Takahashi (the new Japanese owner of Arnold's Drive-In) starting in season three (1975–76). The story line was that Takahashi had purchased the Milwaukee eatery from the original Arnold but adopted the former's first name, explaining that it was too expensive for him to purchase the additional neon sign letters required to rename it "Takahashi's".

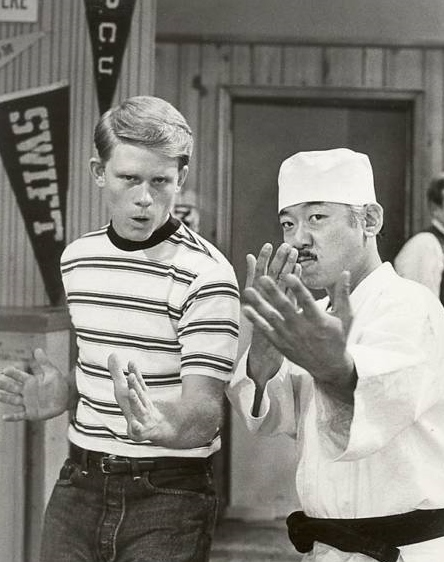
Arnold Takahashi with Richie (Ron Howard, left) on the TV series Happy Days in the 1975–76 season.

As the new owner, Morita moonlighted as a martial arts instructor, teaching self-defense classes at the drive-in after hours. He also played "Arnold" as a guest star during seasons four and six before returning as a recurring character for season 10 (1982–83) and as a guest star in the final 11th season. Morita also reprised the character of Arnold on Blansky's Beauties in 1977.

=== The Karate Kid film series ===
During the 1970s, Morita gained particular fame on Happy Days before his work as Mr. Miyagi in the Karate Kid films. The original preferred choice was Toshiro Mifune, who had appeared in the Akira Kurosawa films Rashomon (1950), Seven Samurai (1954), and The Hidden Fortress (1958), but Mifune did not speak English. Morita later auditioned for the role, but was initially rejected for the part due to his close association with stand-up comedy, and with the character Arnold from Happy Days. Producer Jerry Weintraub in particular did not want Morita, as he saw him as a comedic actor. Morita eventually tested five times before Weintraub himself offered him the role, ultimately winning it because he grew a beard and patterned his accent after his uncle. After Morita was cast and although he had been using the name Pat for years, Weintraub suggested that Morita be billed with his given name to sound "more ethnic".

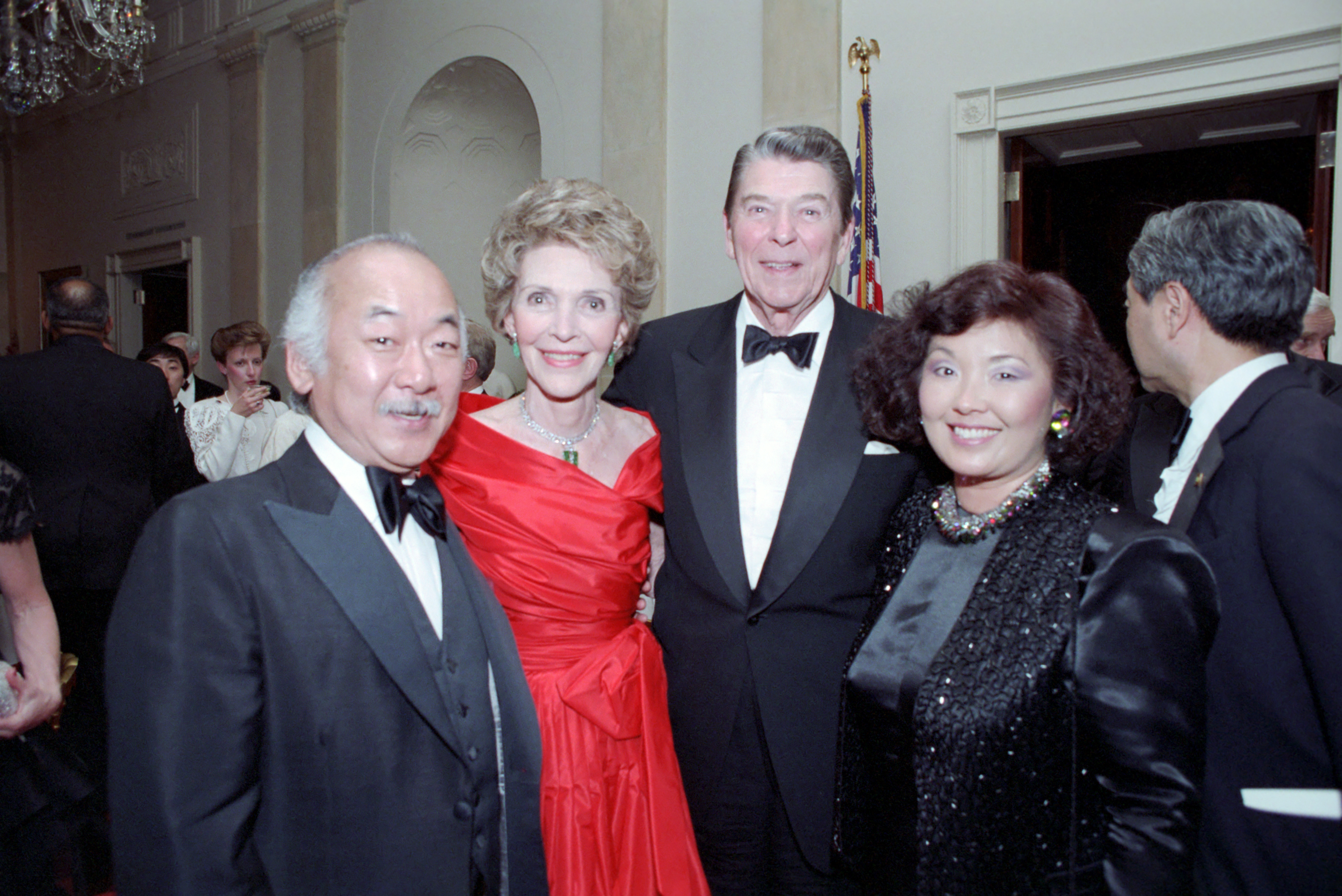
President Ronald Reagan and Nancy Reagan posing for photos with Pat and Yuki Morita in 1987.

In the first film, The Karate Kid (1984), Morita was nominated for an Academy Award for Best Supporting Actor and a corresponding Golden Globe Award, for his role as the wise karate teacher Mr. Miyagi who taught bullied teenager Daniel LaRusso (Ralph Macchio) the art of Goju-ryu karate. He was recognized as Noriyuki "Pat" Morita at the 57th Academy Awards ceremony. He reprised the role twice more with Macchio in The Karate Kid Part II (1986) and The Karate Kid Part III (1989). From 1989 to 1990, Morita voiced Mr. Miyagi in the animated series, The Karate Kid, narrating the plot of each episode before the opening. In 1994, he starred in The Next Karate Kid with Hilary Swank (as bullied teenager Julie Pierce) instead of Macchio.

=== Television series ===
Morita was the star of two television series. In 1976, he starred as inventor Taro Takahashi in his own show, Mr. T and Tina, the first Asian-American sitcom on network TV. The character first appeared on an episode of Welcome Back, Kotter and was spun-off into his own series, which ABC placed on Saturday nights. It was quickly canceled after five episodes in the fall of 1976. Morita also starred in the ABC detective show Ohara (1987–1988); it was cancelled after two seasons due to poor ratings.

=== Later work ===
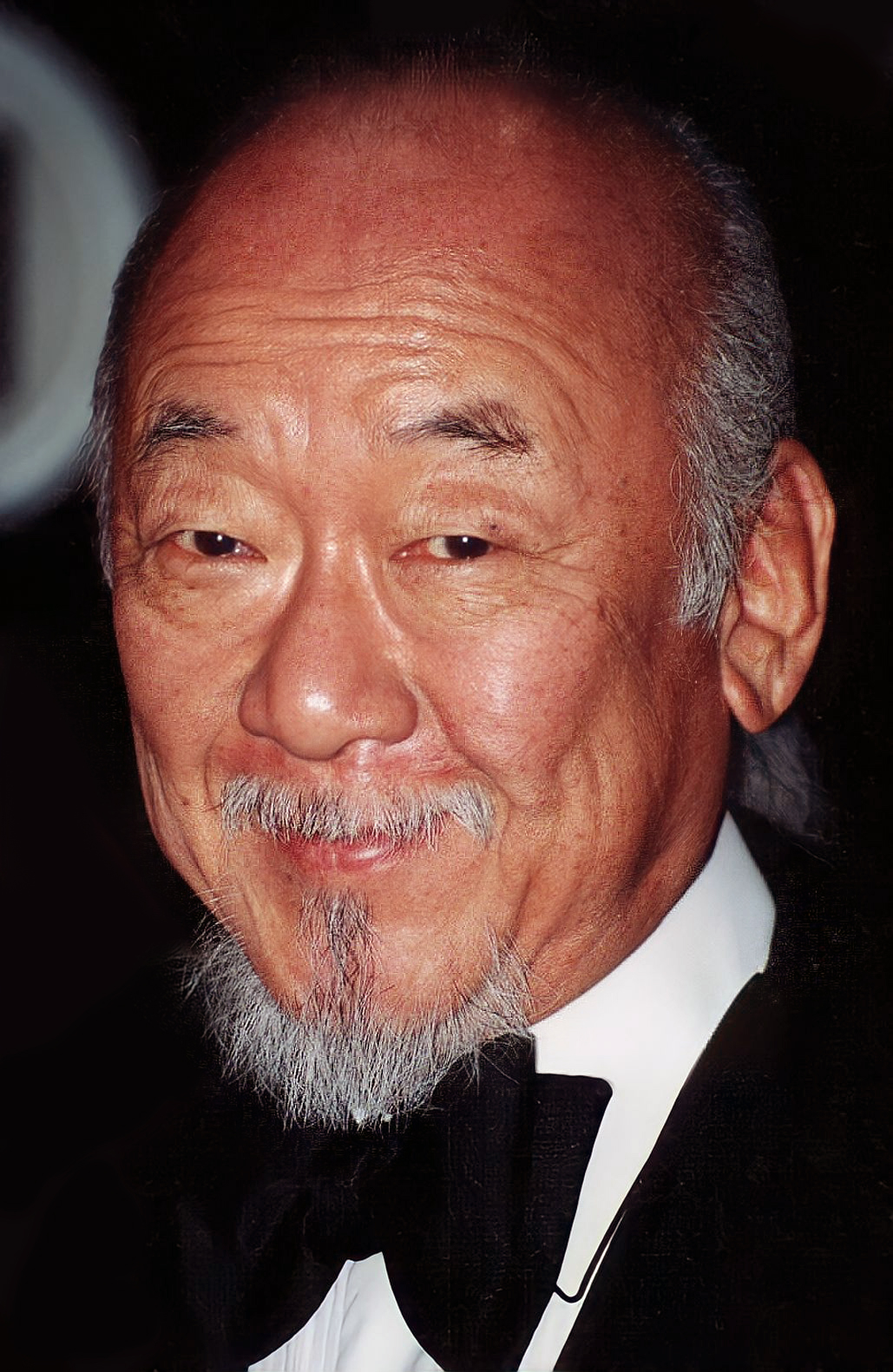
Morita in 2002

Morita went on to play Tommy Tanaka in the Kirk Douglas-starring television movie Amos, receiving his first Primetime Emmy Award nomination and second Golden Globe Award nomination for the role.

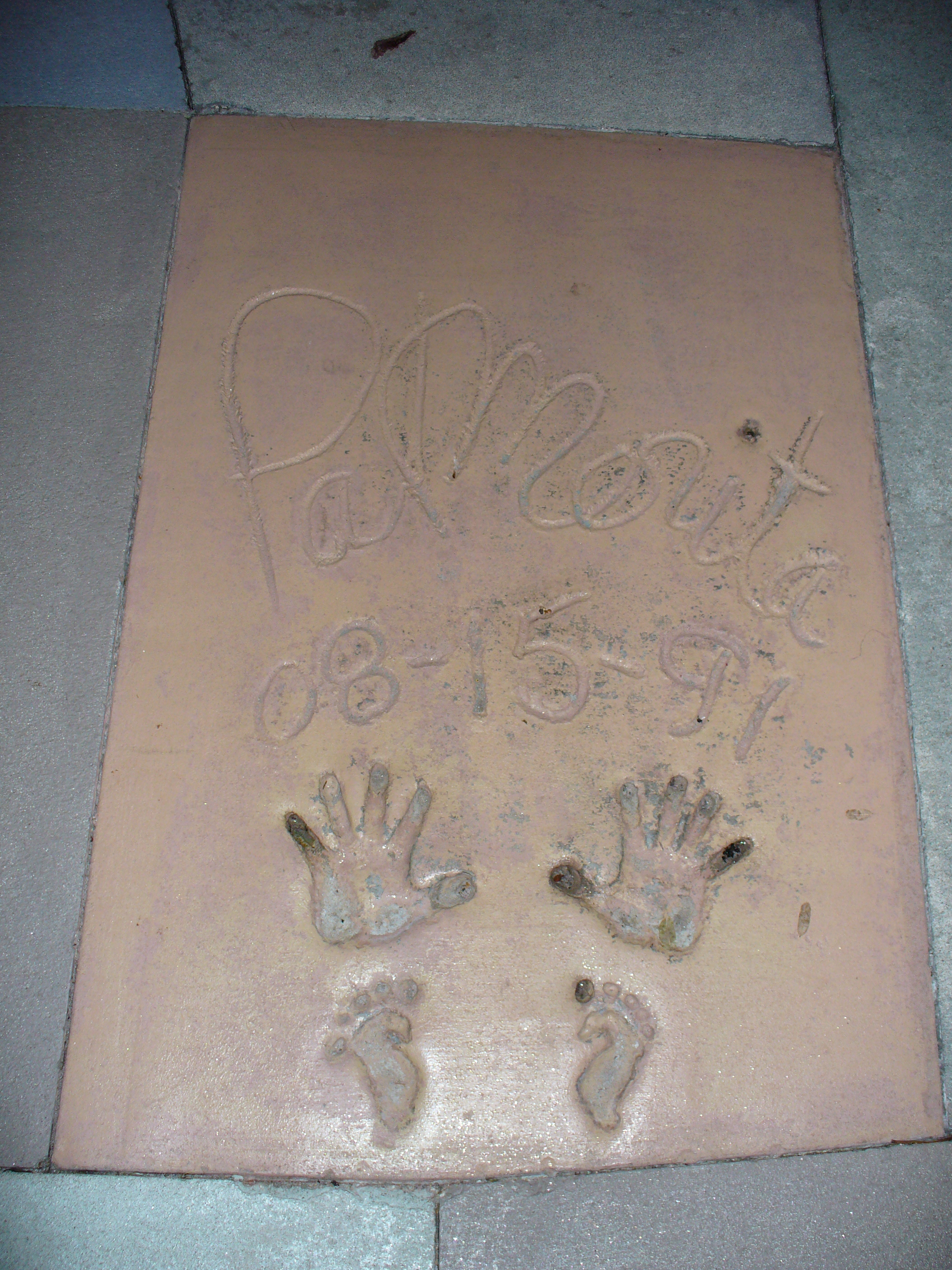
The handprints of Pat Morita in front of The Great Movie Ride at Walt Disney World's Disney's Hollywood Studios theme park

Morita wrote and starred in the World War II romance film Captive Hearts (1987). He hosted the educational home video series Britannica's Tales Around the World (1990–1991). Morita made an appearance on The Fresh Prince of Bel-Air in the 1994 Season 5 episode "Love Hurts". He also made a guest appearance on a 1996 episode of Married... with Children. Later in his career, Morita starred on the Nickelodeon television series The Mystery Files of Shelby Woo (1996–1998) and had a recurring role on the sitcom The Hughleys (2000). He went on to star in the short film Talk To Taka as a sushi chef who doles out advice to anyone who will hear him. Morita voiced the Emperor of China in Disney's 36th animated feature Mulan (1998) and reprised the role in Mulan II (2004), a direct-to-video sequel and Kingdom Hearts II. He received a star on the Hollywood Walk of Fame in 1994.

Morita spoofed his role as "Mr. Miyagi" in a series of commercials for Colgate toothpaste; he portrayed the white-clad Wisdom Tooth, hailing Colgate as "The Wise Choice". Morita also co-starred with Ichiro Suzuki in a 1996 Nissan commercial aired in Japan.

Morita had a cameo appearance in the 2001 Alien Ant Farm music video "Movies". His appearance in the video spoofed his role in The Karate Kid. In 2002, Morita made a guest appearance on an episode of Spy TV. The following year, he had a cameo on an episode of the sitcom Yes, Dear, as an unnamed karate teacher, potentially being Miyagi. Morita would also reprise his role (to an extent) in the stop-motion animated series Robot Chicken in 2005.

== Personal life ==
Morita was married 3 times, to Kathleen Yamachi (m. 1953; div. 1967), Yukiye Kitahara (m. 1970; div. 1989), and Evelyn Guerrero (m. 1994). He had 3 children. He was an alcoholic for most of his adult life, drinking almost every day, which was the main underlying cause of his death. His wife Evelyn Guerrero went to Al-Anon to deal with being married to an alcoholic. The addiction took a major toll on their marriage.

== Death ==
On November 24, 2005, Morita died of kidney failure, following a urinary tract and gallbladder bacterial infection at his home in Las Vegas, at age 73.

== Posthumous credits ==
Roles created prior to his death were included in a few posthumous works. Morita voiced Master Udon in the SpongeBob SquarePants episode "Karate Island" (the episode was dedicated to his memory). He had a role in the independent feature film Only the Brave (2006), about the 442nd Regimental Combat Team, playing the father of lead actor (and director) Lane Nishikawa (the film included two other Karate Kid stars, Yuji Okumoto and Tamlyn Tomita). Morita also had roles in Act Your Age (2011), Royal Kill (2009), and Remove All Obstacles (2010).

The fifth episode of the Netflix series Cobra Kai was dedicated in his memory. In-universe, Mr. Miyagi died on November 15, 2011, but is frequently referenced via archive footage from the original films.

Morita's contributions to cinema and his legacy have been the subject of two documentaries including Pat Morita: Long Story Short and More than Miyagi, The Pat Morita Story in which he appeared in archival footage.

== Filmography ==
=== Film ===
Year	Title	Role	Notes
1964	Car Thieves	Komugi	Credited as Noriyuki Morita
1967	Thoroughly Modern Millie	Bun Foo / Oriental No. 2	
1968	The Shakiest Gun in the West	Wong	
1972	Every Little Crook and Nanny	Nonaka	
1972	Where Does It Hurt?	Nishimoto	
1972	Cancel My Reservation	Yamamoto	
1975	I Wonder Who's Killing Her Now?	Heshy Yamamoto	
1976	Midway	Rear Admiral Ryūnosuke Kusaka	
1980	Hito Hata: Raise the Banner	Yamada	
1980	When Time Ran Out	Sam	
1981	Full Moon High	The Silversmith	
1982	Savannah Smiles	Father OHara	
1982	Jimmy the Kid	Maurice	
1982	Slapstick of Another Kind	Chinese Ambassador Ah Fong	
1983	The Daltons on the Loose	Jolly Jumper	English American version
1984	The Karate Kid	Mr. Miyagi	Nominated – Academy Award for Best Supporting Actor
1984	Night Patrol	Rape Victim	
1986	The Karate Kid Part II	Mr. Miyagi	
1987	Captive Hearts	Fukushima	
1989	The Karate Kid Part III	Mr. Miyagi	Nominated – Golden Raspberry Award for Worst Supporting Actor
1989	Collision Course	Inspector Fujitsuka Natsuo	
1991	Strawberry Road	Old Man's Brother	
1991	Do or Die	Masakana "Kane" Kaneshiro	
1991	Lena's Holiday	Fred	
1991	Goodbye Paradise	Ben	
1992	Honeymoon in Vegas	Mahi Mahi	
1992	Miracle Beach	Gus	
1992	Auntie Lee's Meat Pies	Chief Koal	
1992	Genghis Khan	Emperor Wang	unfinished film
1993	American Ninja V	Master Tetsu	
1993	Even Cowgirls Get the Blues	The Chink	
1993	Living and Working in Space	Cap	
1994	Great Conquest: The Romance of Three Kingdoms	Narrator	English version
1994	The Next Karate Kid	Keisuke Miyagi	
1995	Timemaster	Isaiah	
1995	The Misery Brothers	Judge	
1996	Bloodsport II: The Next Kumite	David Leung	
1996	Spy Hard	Brian, Waiter In Restaurant	
1996	Reggie's Prayer	Principal	
1996	Bloodsport III	David Leung	
1996	Earth Minus Zero	Dr. Mobius Jefferson	
1997	Captured Alive	Sam Kashawahara	
1998	Mulan	The Emperor of China	Voice
1999	King Cobra	Nick Hashimoto	
1999	Inferno	Jubal Early	
1999	Los Gringos	The Samurai	Short film
2000	Brother	Guy At The Poker Table	Uncredited
2000	Talk to Taka	Taka	Short film
2000	I'll Remember April	Abe Tanaka	
2000	Hammerlock	Un Huong Lo	
2001	House of Luk	Kwang Luk	
2001	The Boys of Sunset Ridge	Charlie Watanabe	
2001	The Center of the World	Taxi Driver	
2001	Shadow Fury	Dr. Oh	
2001	Hwasango	Vice Principal Jang Hak-Sa	English American version
2002	The Stoneman	Professor Stevens	
2002	The Biggest Fan	Richard Limp	
2003	High Roller: The Stu Ungar Story	Mr. Leo	
2004	Miss Cast Away and the Island Girls	Himself	Cameo
2004	Elvis Has Left the Building	Man In Turban	
2004	Mulan II	The Emperor of China	Voice; direct-to-video
2005	Down and Derby	Ono Yakimoto	
2005	American Fusion	Lao Dong	
2006	Spymate	Kiro	Filmed in 2003; Released posthumously
2006	Only the Brave	Seigo Takata	Released posthumously
2006	The Number One Girl	Mr. Sakata	Released posthumously
2006	18 Fingers of Death!	Freeman Lee	Released posthumously
2009	Royal Kill	Exhibition Manager	Released posthumously
2010	Remove All Obstacles	The Guru	Short film; Released posthumously
2011	Act Your Age	Tom	Released posthumously
2013	Blunt Movie	Mr. Miyami	Released posthumously
2014	Rice Girl	Peter Ong	Final film role; Released posthumously
2025	Karate Kid: Legends	Mr. Miyagi	Archival footage from The Karate Kid Part II (1986); released posthumously

=== Television ===
Year	Title	Role	Notes
1971	Green Acres	Charlie Lee	Episode: "Hawaiian Honeymoon"
1972	Evil Roy Slade	Turhan	Television film
1972	Columbo	Houseboy	Episode: "Etude in Black"
1972	The Odd Couple	Mr. Wing	Episode: "Partner's Investment"
1972	The Bob Newhart Show	The Bartender	Episode: "Bob and Emily and Howard and Carol and Jerry"
1973	Hawaii Five-O	Phoebe	Episode: "Tricks Are Not Treats"
1973–1974	M*A*S*H	Captain Sam Pak	Episodes: "Deal Me Out", "The Chosen People"
1974	Cannon	Chuck Yamagata	Episode: "The Avenger"
1974	Punch and Jody	Takahasi	Television film
1974–1976	Sanford and Son	Ah Chew	7 episodes
1975	Kung Fu	Chan	Episode: "Ambush"
1975–1983	Happy Days	Matsuo "Arnold" Takahashi	26 episodes
1976	Welcome Back, Kotter	Mr. Takahashi	Episode: "Career Day"
1976	Mr. T and Tina	Mr. Takahashi	5 episodes
1976	Farewell to Manzanar	Zenahiro	Television film
1977	Blansky's Beauties	Arnold	13 episodes
1977–1987	The Love Boat	Vincent Mr. Yamashiro	Episode: "The Old Man and the Runaway" Episode: "Pacific Princess Overtures"
1978	Man from Atlantis	Moby	Episode: "Imp"
1978	The Incredible Hulk	Fred	Episode: "Stop the Presses"
1985	Alice in Wonderland	The Horse	Episode: "Part 2 - Through the Looking-Glass"
1986	Babes In Toyland	The Toymaster	Television film
1987–1988	Ohara	Lieutenant Ohara	
1988	Big Bird in Japan	"Bamboo Princess" Play Narrator (voice)	Television film
1989	The Karate Kid	Mr. Miyagi	Opening narration; 12 episodes
1990	Hiroshima: Out of the Ashes	Yoodo Toda	Television film
1991	Harry and the Hendersons	Kenji Sahuara	Episode: "The Bigfoot Who Ate Seattle"
1992	Choose Your Own Adventure: The Case of the Silk King	Unknown	ABC Weekend Special
1993	Space Rangers	Nazzer	
1993	Dave's World	Hardware Store Owner	Episode: "Exorcising with Dave Barry"
1994	The Fresh Prince of Bel-Air	Mr. Yoshi	Episode: "Love Hurts"
1995	Singapore Sling: Road to Mandalay	Y.C. Kung	Television film
1995	Lamb Chop's Special Chanukah	Himself	Television film
1996	Murder, She Wrote	Akira Hitaki	Episode: "Kendo Killing"
1996	Boy Meets World	Wise Man	Episode: "I Was a Teenage Spy"
1996	Married... with Children	Mr. Shimakawa	Episode: "Turning Japanese"
1996–1998	The Mystery Files of Shelby Woo	Michael "Mike" Woo	29 episodes
1998	Family Matters	Mr. Tanaka	Episode: "Grill of My Dreams"
1998	The Outer Limits	Dr. Michael Chen	Episode: "In the Zone"
1998	Diagnosis: Murder	Martin Gaylord	Episode: "Food Fight"
1999	Gone to Maui	Mr. Ono	Television film
2001	Son of the Beach	The King	Episode: "B.J. Blue Hawaii"
2001	Baywatch	Hideki Tanaka	Recurring role as the father of Kekoa Tanaka
2003	Yes, Dear	Karate Teacher	Episode: "When Jimmy met Greggy"
2004	The Karate Dog	Chin Li	Television film
2005	Robot Chicken	Himself	Voice; Episode: "S&M Present"
2006	SpongeBob SquarePants	Master Udon	Voice; Episode: "Karate Island"; Dedicated to his memory, released posthumously
2018–2025	Cobra Kai	Mr. Miyagi	Archival footage, Released posthumously

=== Documentary ===
Year	Title	Role	Notes
1997	Beyond Barbed Wire	Narrator	
2000	Diamonds in the Rough: The Legacy of Japanese American Baseball	Narrator	NBRP Documentary
2010	Interviews of Ninja's Creed	Interviewee	
2015	The Real Miyagi	Interviewee	
2019	Pat Morita: Long Story Short	Manuscript Writer and interviewee	
2021	More than Miyagi: The Pat Morita Story	Archival footage and interviewee	Released posthumously

=== Video game ===
Year	Title	Role	Notes
2006	Kingdom Hearts II	The Emperor of China	Voice; Released posthumously
