= Nice Dreams =

1981 film by Tommy Chong

- Directed by: Tommy Chong
- Written by: Tommy Chong; Cheech Marin
- Produced by: Howard Brown
- Starring: Cheech Marin; Thomas Chong; Stacy Keach
- Cinematography: Charles Correll; Brianne Murphy
- Edited by: Thomas K. Advildsen; Tony Lombardo
- Music by: Harry Betts
- Production companies: C & C Brown Production
- Distributed by: Columbia Pictures
- Release date: June 5, 1981
- Running time: 88 minutes
- Country: United States
- Language: English
- Box office: $35 million

Nice Dreams is a 1981 American action adventure stoner comedy film directed by Tommy Chong and starring Cheech & Chong, in their third feature film. Released in 1981 by Columbia Pictures, the film focuses on the duo having gotten rich selling cannabis out of an ice cream truck, and evading the Drug Enforcement Administration, led by Sergeant Stedanko (Stacy Keach), who are trying to bust an alleged drug kingpin named "Mr. Big", and discover a strain of marijuana that turns people into lizards, including Stedanko, who has been smoking cannabis to get inside the head of a drug user.

The film costars Paul Reubens and Evelyn Guerrero, and features small appearances by comedians Sandra Bernhard and Michael Winslow, and a cameo by Timothy Leary. Nice Dreams grossed $35 million, but it received mixed reviews.

== Plot ==
Cheech and Chong have a new business driving an ice cream truck selling "Happy Herb's Nice Dreams". Their business makes its money not with ice cream but with high-grade marijuana, stolen from their friend Weird Jimmy whose plantation is under their beach house camouflaged as a pool. The two eventually make a fortune and blissfully plan on becoming "Sun Kings in Paradise" which involves buying an island, guitars, and enjoying many women.

The police are on Cheech and Chong's tails from the start, as they trick the stoners into selling them some of their "ice cream". Sergeant Stedanko, now himself a stoner, tests the marijuana and slowly turns into a lizard (a side effect). Just as the police storm their house, Cheech and Chong pack up the marijuana in their truck and drive off, leaving Weird Jimmy to be arrested. While Sergeant Stedanko continues smoking their product, becoming stranger and more lizard-like, his two deputies, Detective Drooler and his inept partner Noodles, tail the stoners.

Cheech and Chong dine at a Chinese restaurant to celebrate their wealth. There, they are accosted by an annoying record agent who bothers Chong (mistaking him for Jerry Garcia), followed by Cheech's ex-girlfriend Donna and a cocaine-snorting mental patient, Howie "Hamburger Dude". The four of them snort cocaine under the table, prompting Chong to sign away all their money to Howie for a useless check, which they are unable to cash due to none of them having an ID.

Cheech takes a drunk Donna out to her truck to have sex, but she passes out. A pair of incompetent California highway patrolmen show up, almost busting Cheech when Chong abruptly shows up in their ice cream truck. Not wanting to deal with the impending long procedure of the arrest, they let Cheech and Chong go.

The two head back to Donna's apartment. While attempting a threesome, Chong leaves to get ice. At this point, Donna's crazed racist biker husband Animal shows up, having broken out of prison. Cheech tries to escape out the window and ends up climbing the hotel naked. Chong then returns to the room and hides under the bed. Eventually, Animal has sex with Donna and they fall asleep. Cheech gets back into the hotel, returns to the room, and retrieves some clothes to wear.

Cheech then realizes Chong has signed away all their money to Howie. After getting a lift from Drooler and Noodles (disguised as women), the stoners find and break into the address on the check: a mental institution. They spend the night and in the morning they find Howie among the inmates. Cheech tries to grab Howie to get their money, but the doctors believe Cheech to be another patient and lock him in a straitjacket in a padded room. They also believe Chong is a doctor and put him in charge of medication. Chong finds a doctor to help, and Cheech and Chong are offered "the key to the universe" (LSD).

Chong passes out but Cheech endures a bizarre trip that ends the next morning when the head nurse awakens them. She has realized what has happened and apologizes to them, returns their money and sets them free. At this point, Stedanko's cops show up and arrest the head nurse and Howie instead. By now, Stedanko has become even more lizard like, complete with a tail.

With Weird Jimmy's marijuana plantation busted, Cheech and Chong resort to becoming male strippers at Club Paradise where they are billed as "The Sun Kings", Maui and Wowie.

== Cast ==
- Cheech Marin as Cheech
- Tommy Chong as Chong "Man"
- Stacy Keach as Sergeant Stedanko
- Paul Reubens as Howie Hamburger Dude
- Evelyn Guerrero as Donna
- Peter Jason as Detective Drooler
- Tim Rossovich as "Noodles"
- Timothy Leary as Himself
- Sandra Bernhard as Girl Nut
- Tony Cox as "Midget Nut" (Credited as Joe Anthony Cox)
- Michael Winslow as Superman Nut
- Cheryl Smith as Group Blonde #1
- Linnea Quigley as Group Blonde #2

== Reception ==
Janet Maslin of The New York Times wrote: "If marijuana has a way of heightening the hilarious aspects of things that might not otherwise be funny, then this is very much a marijuana movie. But Nice Dreams also has a more general appeal than that. These are high spirits that don't have to do with being high." Variety noted: "Although plot is impossible and filmmaking is still on the rudimentary side, effort is chock full of yocks, as the zippy pace, short running time and succession of outrageous bit players keep energy and audience attention from flagging." Gary Arnold of The Washington Post called the film "an outrageously amusing ramble". Sheila Benson of the Los Angeles Times wrote that the film "sure doesn't work if you're straight". Gene Siskel of the Chicago Tribune gave the film one-and-a-half stars out of four and described the level of humor as "infantile".

Nice Dreams holds a 50% rating on Rotten Tomatoes based on six reviews.

=== Box office ===
The film grossed $8,153,738 from 1,390 theaters in its opening weekend, the highest weekend of 1981 at the time of its opening. After 10 days, it had a gross of $17,392,850 and Film Comment noted that it had "garnered almost all of its business in the first two weeks, demonstrating that Cheech & Chong have a large and loyal following - they're the Abbott and Costello of the Head Set". The film was the seventh highest-grossing film of the summer with $35 million.
