= William Zabka =

American actor (born 1965)

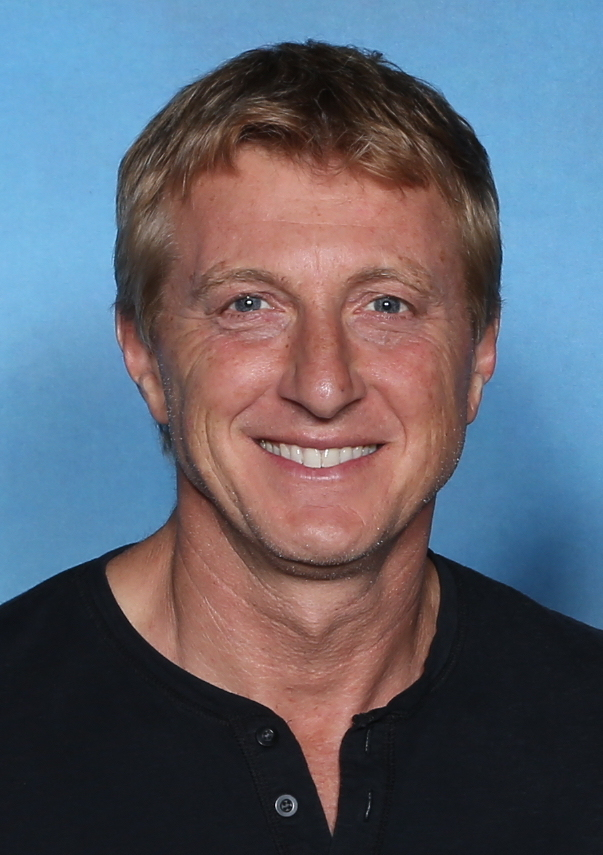
- Zabka at GalaxyCon Richmond in 2019
- Born: William Michael Zabka; October 20, 1965 (age 61); New York City, New York, U.S.
- Education: California State University, Northridge (dropped out)
- Occupation: Actor
- Years active: 1983–
- Spouse: Stacie (m. 2008)
- Children: 2

William Michael Zabka (/ˈzæbkə/; born October 20, 1965) is an American actor. He is best known for his role of Johnny Lawrence in The Karate Kid (1984), The Karate Kid Part II (1986), and the TV series Cobra Kai (2018–2025).

Zabka's career took off with The Karate Kid, despite having no prior karate training. During the 1980s, he appeared in the films Just One of the Guys (1985), Back to School (1986), and the television series The Equalizer (1986–1989). In the 1990s and 2000s, Zabka focused on independent films and filmmaking. In 2004, he was nominated for an Academy Award for co-writing and producing the short film Most. Zabka continued his directing career, including music videos for Rascal Flatts. From 2018 to 2025, Zabka reprised his role as Johnny Lawrence in the YouTube Red and Netflix series Cobra Kai, which he co-executive produced with Karate Kid costar Ralph Macchio.

== Early life ==
Zabka was born on October 20, 1965, in New York City, the son of Nancy, a business liaison, producer, and production assistant, and Stanley Zabka, a director, writer, and composer. Zabka has a younger brother and a younger sister. Stan is of Czech and German descent and was born in Des Moines, Iowa. He worked as production manager on many motion pictures, including the Chuck Norris film Forced Vengeance (1982).

Zabka lived on Long Island until he was 10, when his family then moved to San Fernando Valley California. In 1983, Zabka graduated from El Camino Real Charter High School in Los Angeles, before briefly attending California State University, Northridge and majoring in film.

== Career ==
While attending his first semester at Cal State Northridge, Zabka began auditioning for The Karate Kid (1984). Halfway through his first semester, Zabka would drop out of school when he got his breakout acting role as Johnny Lawrence, the main antagonist to the title character and protagonist played by Ralph Macchio. At the time, Zabka had no training in karate, but was an accomplished wrestler. Participating in the film inspired Zabka to learn the martial art of Tang Soo Do and he later earned his second green belt. The film's final scene was filmed at Cal State Northridge's gymnasium, and Zabka later jokingly commented on this stating: “So I went to college as a student and came back by the end of the semester as one of the stars of Karate Kid.”

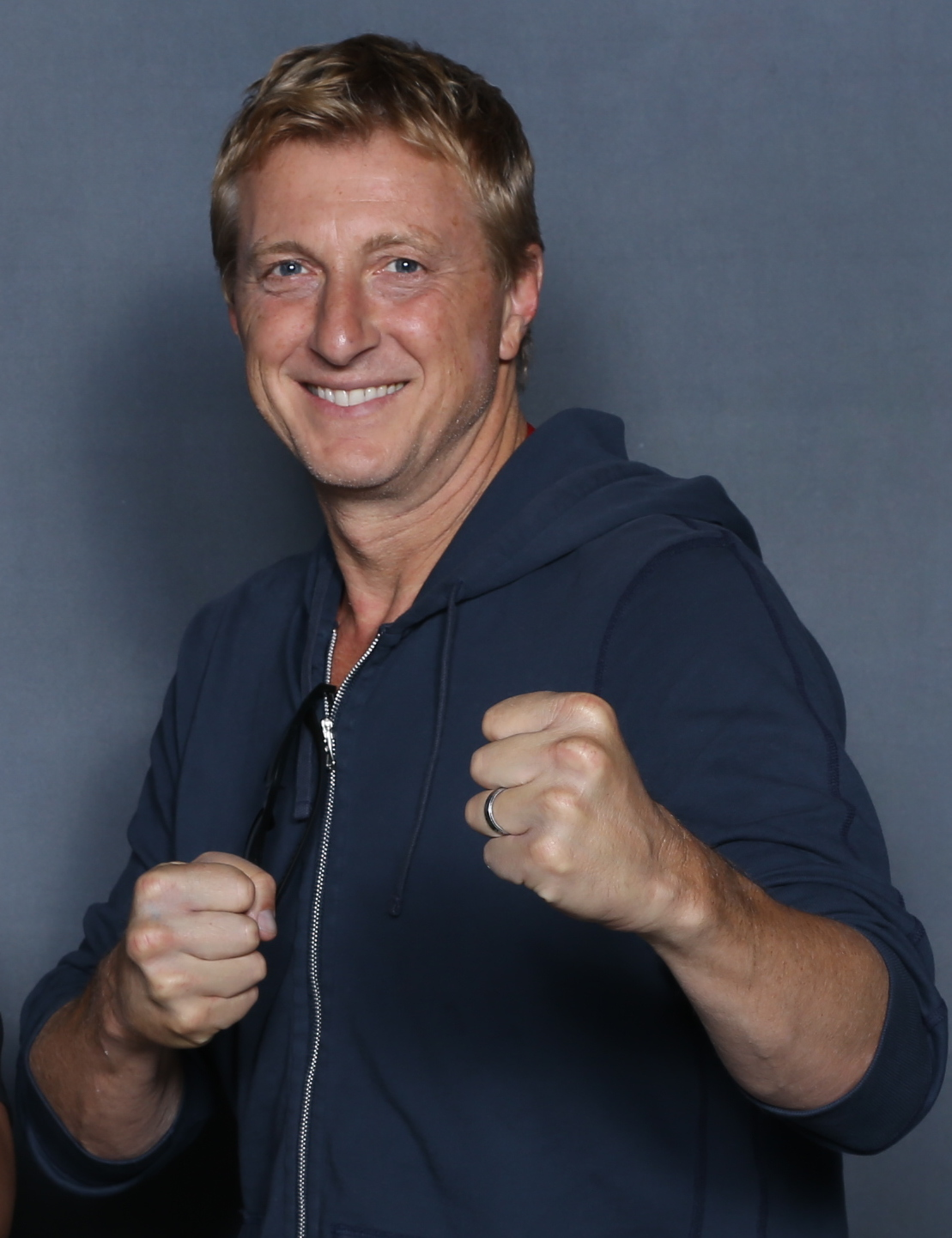
Zabka in 2018

Later in the 1980s, Zabka appeared in the comedy movies Just One of the Guys (1985) and Back to School (1986). He co-starred on the CBS television series The Equalizer as the son of the title character (1986–89). Zabka also played Jack, Audrey's jock boyfriend, in National Lampoon's European Vacation (1985). He later tried to step away from playing the class bully character. In an interview, Zabka mentioned that he was sometimes hassled in public by random people due to the villainous characters he was best known for. In 1986, Zabka had some smaller roles in films such as Dreams of Gold: The Mel Fisher Story and Back to School, while also returning as Johnny Lawrence in The Karate Kid Part II.

During the 1990s and 2000s, Zabka acted mostly in independent films and did behind the scenes work while studying to be a filmmaker. In 2003, he wrote and produced the short film Most (aka The Bridge) shot on location in the Czech Republic and Poland. Later that year, Most had its world premiere at the Sundance Film Festival and the film won numerous awards at prestigious film festivals, including Best of Festival at the Palm Springs International Festival of Short Films in 2003. In 2004, Zabka was nominated for an Academy Award for Most in the Live Action Short Film category.

In 2007, Zabka directed and starred in a music video for the band No More Kings' song, "Sweep the Leg." The video stars Zabka as a caricature of himself, living in a trailer in the desert and obsessed with his role in The Karate Kid. The video includes cameos by several of the original Karate Kid cast members, including Martin Kove and Ralph Macchio.

In 2010, Zabka made a cameo appearance in the comedy movie Hot Tub Time Machine. That same year, Zabka directed Rascal Flatts in their music video for the song "Why Wait" and also directed the video for their 2017 hit "Yours If You Want It." The video was nominated for Group Video of the Year at the 2018 CMT Music Awards.

In 2010, Zabka produced the feature length documentary White Wanderer: Mzungu, which followed four Americans in Africa as they confront harsh realities and help empower hundreds of impoverished street children. He also served as executive producer for the 2014 documentary Never A Neverland which documents the people of Swaziland trying to save their country from extinction.

In 2013, Zabka and Macchio guest starred in the season 8 episode of How I Met Your Mother, "The Bro Mitzvah." Zabka also appeared in several episodes of the sitcom's ninth season, playing a fictional version of himself. Zabka also directed commercials for clients including Little Tikes and Verizon at Heresy in Venice, California. He also voiced Johnny Lawrence along with two other characters in an episode of Robot Chicken entitled "Caffeine-Induced Aneurysm". Zabka had a featured role as Milton Malcolm in the 2015 drama film Where Hope Grows, that same year he also appeared in an episode of Gortimer Gibbon's Life on Normal Street where he played Sensei Jeff.

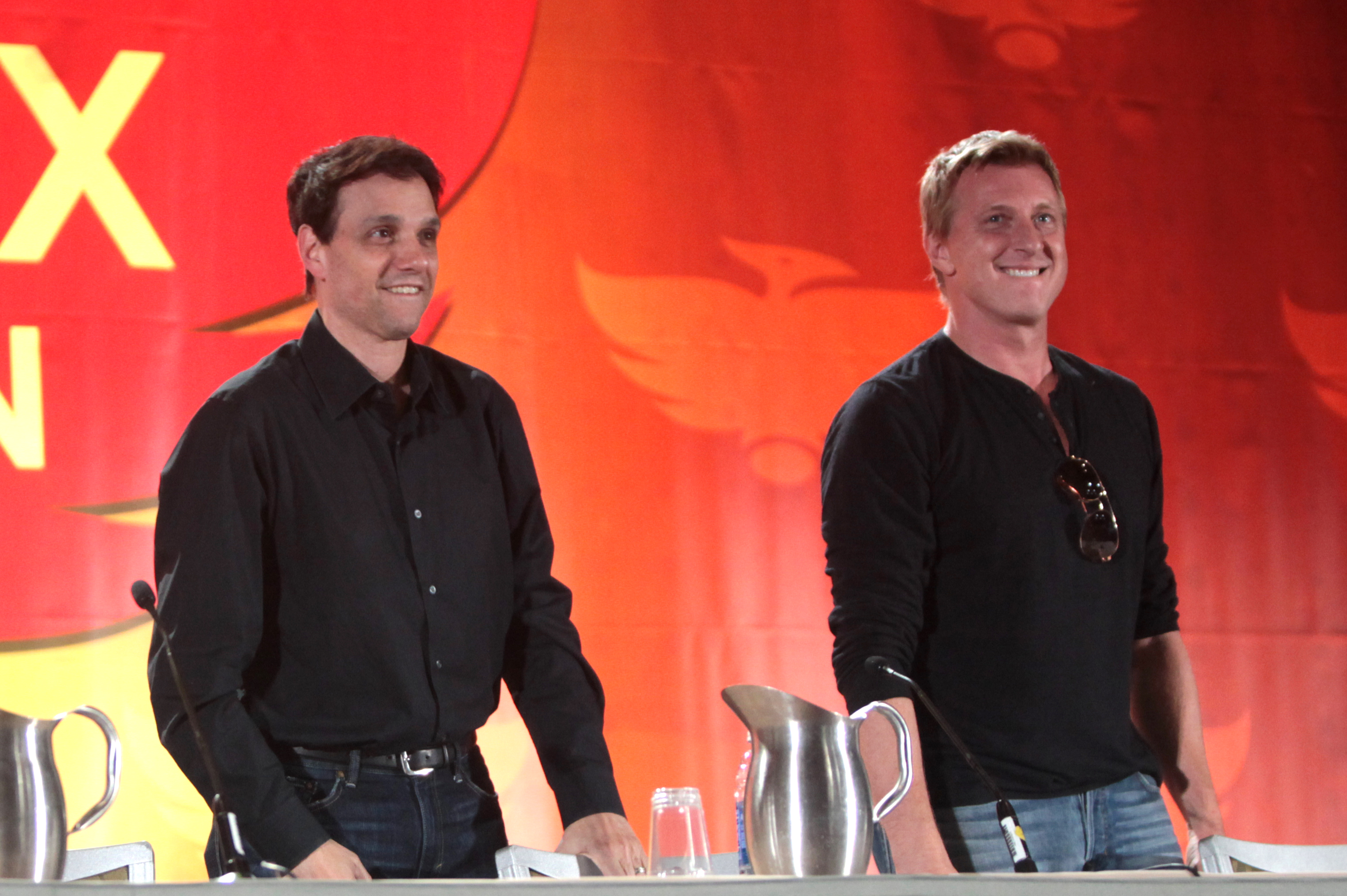
Zabka with Ralph Macchio in 2016

On August 4, 2017, it was announced that Zabka would reprise his role as Johnny Lawrence in a 10-episode Karate Kid revival series for YouTube Red titled Cobra Kai that debuted in 2018. Zabka also co-executive produces the series with Ralph Macchio. The series begins 33 years after the events of the first film, and revolves around a down and out Johnny who, seeking to rebuild his life, reopens the Cobra Kai dojo. It reignites his rivalry with a now successful Daniel LaRusso (Macchio), who has been struggling to maintain balance in his life without the guidance of his now deceased mentor, Mr. Miyagi. The series ran for six seasons, concluding in 2025, with Zabka receiving praise for his passion and ability to convey complex emotions, particularly in dramatic scenes involving his character's past, relationships with other characters, and Johnny's redemption arc.

In November 2024, Zabka appeared on the Tonight Show Starting Jimmy Fallon Show in celebration of The Karate Kids 40th anniversary. He also appeared as a celebrity guest on Password. In 2025, Zabka made a cameo appearance as Johnny Lawrence in the final scene of the film Karate Kid Legends.

On May 6, 2026, it was reported by Deadline that Zabka had been cast for a recurring role in the second season of the Amazon Prime Video crime drama series Scarpetta.

== Personal life ==
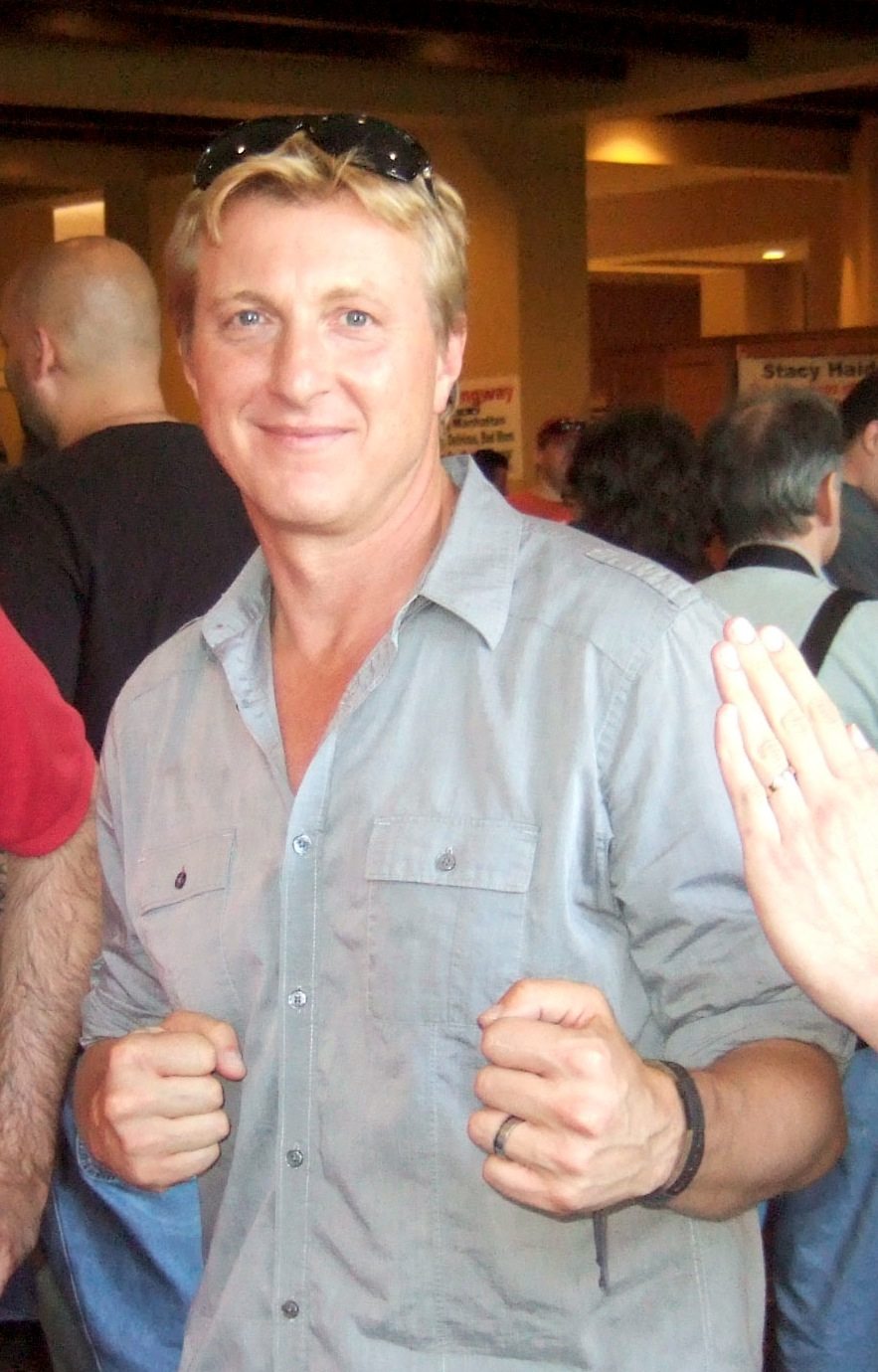
Zabka in 2013

Zabka married his wife, Stacie, in 2008 and they have two children.

Since returning to his role as Johnny Lawrence, Zabka has started training in karate regularly along with tang soo do. He also enjoys spending time outdoors surfing, scuba diving and river rafting.

=== Music ===
Zabka is a fan of hair metal and is a guitar player himself, a hobby he has had since childhood. Zabka even attended the Dick Grove School of Music in California, where he learned to read music and studied to be a trained session player. Zabka has played in a few bands with his friends one of them being named Acoustic Outlaws, where they would play at local festivals. In 2019, Zabka played his character Johnny Lawrence’s theme song "Ace Degenerate" live alongside Leo Birenberg and Zach Robinson, in front of a sold out crowd at the Whisky a Go Go.

== Filmography ==
=== Film ===
| Year | Title | Role | Notes |
|---|---|---|---|
| 1984 | The Karate Kid | Johnny Lawrence | |
| 1985 | Just One of the Guys | Greg Tolan | |
| 1985 | National Lampoon's European Vacation | Jack | |
| 1986 | Back to School | Chas Osborne | |
| 1986 | The Karate Kid Part II | Johnny Lawrence | Cameo |
| 1986 | Dreams of Gold: The Mel Fisher Story | Kim Fisher | TV movie |
| 1988 | A Tiger's Tale | Randy | |
| 1989 | Protect and Surf | Russell Cooper | TV Movie |
| 1991 | For Parents Only | Ted | Alternative title: Mean Parents Suck |
| 1992 | Shootfighter: Fight to the Death | Ruben | Alternative title: Shootfighter |
| 1994 | Unlawful Passage | Howie | |
| 1995 | Shootfighter II | Ruben | |
| 1995 | The Power Within | Raymond Vonn | Alternative title: Power Man |
| 1996 | To the Ends of Time | Alexander | |
| 1997 | High Voltage | Bulldog | |
| 1999 | Interceptors | Dave | Alternative titles: Interceptor Force; Predator 3: Intercepters; The Last Line of Defence |
| 2000 | Epoch | Joe | Television movie |
| 2000 | Python | Greg Larsen | Television movie |
| 2000 | Falcon Down | Security Guard John | |
| 2001 | Ablaze | Curt Peters | |
| 2001 | Mindstorm | Rojack | Alternative titles: Artificial Telepathy; Project: Human Weapon |
| 2002 | Gale Force | Rance | |
| 2002 | Python II | Greg Larsen | Television movie, credited as Billy Zabka |
| 2002 | Hyper Sonic | The Executive | |
| 2002 | Landspeed | Bob Bailey | |
| 2002 | Dark Descent | Marty (Opening credits only) | Alternative title: Descent Into Darkness |
| 2002 | Antibody | Otto Emmerick | |
| 2003 | Most | - | Alternative title: The Bridge, screenwriter & producer |
| 2004 | Roomies | Slick Salesman | Alternative title: Wild Roomies |
| 2007 | Smiley Face | Prison guard | |
| 2007 | Cake: A Wedding Story | Sam | |
| 2007 | Starting from Scratch | Bill Bowman | |
| 2010 | Hot Tub Time Machine | Rick Steelman | |
| 2010 | Mean Parents Suck | Detective Ted Clement | |
| 2011 | Cross | Griff | |
| 2014 | Where Hope Grows | Milton Malcolm | |
| 2015 | The Dog Who Saved Summer | Officer Johnny & Apollo (Voice) | Dual role |
| 2016 | The Man in the Silo | Kevin | |
| 2024 | The Cobra Kai Movie | Himself | Short film |
| 2025 | Karate Kid: Legends | Johnny Lawrence | Cameo |

=== Television ===
| Year | Title | Role | Notes |
|---|---|---|---|
| 1983 | The Greatest American Hero | Clarence Mortner Jr. | 1 episode |
| 1984 | Gimme a Break! | Jeffery | 1 episode |
| 1984 | CBS Schoolbreak Special | Rick Peterson | 1 episode |
| 1984–1985 | E/R | Druggie Kid/Thief | 1 episode |
| 1985–1989 | The Equalizer | Scott McCall | 12 episodes from "The Equalizer" (Pilot S1.E1) to "Time Present, Time Past" (S4.E16) |
| 2001 | 18 Wheels of Justice | Det. Barron | 1 episode |
| 2011 | Jimmy Kimmel Live! | Johnny Lawrence | 1 episode |
| 2013 | Robot Chicken | Johnny Lawrence, Gibby, American Werewolf (voice) | Guest, season 6, episode 15, "Caffeine-Induced Aneurysm" |
| 2013–2014 | How I Met Your Mother | Clown/himself | Guest star (Season 8), recurring role (Season 9) |
| 2014 | Psych | Coach Bagg | Guest star: A Nightmare on State Street |
| 2015 | Gortimer Gibbon's Life on Normal Street | Sensei Jeff | Guest, season 2, episode 9, "Stanley and the Tattoo of Tall Tales" |
| 2015 | To Appomattox | John Rawlins | TV miniseries |
| 2018–2025 | Cobra Kai | Johnny Lawrence | Main role, also executive producer and directed episode "Rattled" |
| 2024 | Password | Celebrity Guest | Game show |
| 2024 | The Tonight Show Starring Jimmy Fallon | Himself/guest | 1 episode |
| TBD | Scarpetta | TBD | |

== Video games ==
| Year | Title | Role |
|---|---|---|
| 2020 | Cobra Kai: The Karate Kid Saga Continues | Johnny Lawrence (voice) |
| 2022 | Cobra Kai 2: Dojos Rising | Johnny Lawrence (voice) |

== Award nominations ==
| Year | Award | Category | Film | Result |
|---|---|---|---|---|
| 1985 | Young Artist Award | Best Young Supporting Actor in a Motion Picture Musical, Comedy, Adventure or Drama | The Karate Kid | Nominated |
| 2003 | Palm Springs International ShortFest | Best of the festival | Most (shared with Bobby Garabedian) | Won |
| 2003 | Dances With Films | Best of the festival | Most (shared with Bobby Garabedian) | Won |
| 2003 | Heartland International Film Festival | Crystal Heart Award | Most (shared with Bobby Garabedian) | Won |
| 2004 | Academy Awards | Best Live Action Short Film | Most (shared with Bobby Garabedian) | Nominated |
| 2018 | IGN Summer Movie Awards | Best Comedic TV Performance | Cobra Kai | Nominated |
| 2018 | CMT Music Awards | Group Video of the Year | "Yours If You Want It" (director) | Nominated |
| 2020 | MTV Movie & TV Awards: Greatest of All Time | Zero to Hero | Karate kid/Cobra Kai | Won |
| 2021 | Online Film & Television Association | Best Actor in a Comedy Series | Cobra Kai | Nominated |
| 2021 | Primetime Emmy | Outstanding Comedy Series | Cobra Kai (shared) | Nominated |
| 2022 | Critics Choice Super Awards | Best Actor in an Action Series | Cobra Kai | Nominated |
| 2023 | Critics Choice Super Awards | Best Actor in an Action Series, Limited Series or Made-for-TV Movie | Cobra Kai | Nominated |
| 2023 | Online Film & Television Association | Best Actor in a Comedy Series | Cobra Kai | Nominated |
