= New Alcatraz =

- DVD cover
- Directed by: Phillip Roth
- Written by: Terri Neish; Phillip Roth
- Produced by: Jeffery Beach; Ken Olandt
- Starring: Dean Cain; Elizabeth Lackey; Mark Sheppard; Grand L. Bush; Dean Biasucci; Craig Wasson
- Cinematography: Todd Barron
- Edited by: Randy Carter; David Flores
- Music by: Richard McHugh
- Production companies: UFO International; Cell Block Productions
- Distributed by: Columbia TriStar Home Entertainment
- Release date: May 21, 2002
- Running time: 95 minutes
- Country: United States
- Language: English

New Alcatraz (named Boa on VHS and DVD), is a 2002 American direct-to-video science fiction action horror film. It was directed by Phillip Roth and starred Dean Cain. In the middle of Antarctica, a high maximum-security prison called New Alcatraz has recently become operational. When a mining crew inside the prison accidentally drills into a strange rock formation, a giant prehistoric snake is unleashed upon the prison and goes on a killing rampage. It is up to the prison staff, inmates, paleontologists Dr. Robert Trenton and Dr. Jessica Pratt-Trenton, and a group of soldiers to hunt down and eliminate the beast.

== Plot ==
In New Alcatraz, the world's most secure prison located in Antarctica, a drilling operation inadvertently releases a giant, 80 ft (24 m) boa constrictor (fictional species Serpuca largas) from a large, hollow rock that had been preserving it in suspended animation. The Boa chews a hole through the ice, enabling it to escape into the prison. The hole is discovered by workers and Jenkins, a guard is placed on it until the engineers can assess the hole and block it up. Jenkins hears a strange hissing noise in the tunnels and is sent by Sergeant Quinn, his supervisor, to investigate; Jenkins, unnerved, requests backup, causing Quinn to send the engineers, Scott Poluso and Goodman, to help him. Jenkins is stalked and killed by the Boa; arriving on scene, Poluso and Goodman grumble about being woken up. Blood drips down from the pipes onto Poluso, causing him to stare up in confusion, just as the Boa attacks him and Goodman. The engineers’ screams can be heard as the Boa begins to move further into the prison.

The prison sends out a distress call which is received by the United States military. They hire married paleontologists Robert Trenton and Jessica Platt-Trenton to assist a military team led by Major Larsten in the search to destroy the Boa. When they arrive at the prison, they discover a group of survivors, led by head of security Quinn and prison warden Fred Riley.

The security and military personnel split up and set out to find and kill the Boa whilst Robert, Jessica and Fred watch on in the control room. A soldier named McCarthy is killed by the Boa while his partner Simmons is found shot dead; one by one, the other personnel are also killed. Robert and Jessica join in the hunt. After a skirmish with the Boa, a gas pipe ruptures and explodes, killing the remaining security and military members. Robert and Jessica survive and flee from the Boa, but Jessica is seemingly killed. Robert returns to the security room and convinces Fred to release the prisoners to help them escape. Fred releases the prisoners, and the group devises a plan to escape. During the escape, one of the prisoners, a "black hat" hacker named Kelly Mitich, attempts to save himself, only to be killed by the Boa and accidentally causing another gas explosion, killing Fred.

Meanwhile, the other group is led by Chechen prisoner Yuri Breshcov and his cousin Peter Yuvol who had been arrested for attempting to purchase mid-range nuclear missiles for Chechnya. Yuri finds Jessica alive, and they take her in. The Boa then kills Peter and prisoner Jose, but Yuri and Jessica escape to the surface. Meanwhile, Robert and prisoner Patricia O'Boyle, a member of the Irish Republican Army, attempt to escape, but the Boa kills Patricia while Robert escapes to the surface.

Robert, Jessica, and Yuri attempt to escape on the military plane. However, the Boa sneaks onboard and kills one of the pilots. In the ensuing battle, the Boa is ejected from the plane, but Yuri is dragged out with it, and the two fall to their deaths. Robert and Jessica, bewildered but alive, fly to safety.

== Cast ==
- Dean Cain as Dr. Robert Trenton
- Elizabeth Lackey as Dr. Jessica Platt-Trenton
- Mark Sheppard as Yuri Breshcov
- Dean Biasucci as Major Larsten
- Craig Wasson as Warden Fred Riley
- Grand L. Bush as Sergeant Quinn
- Richard Tanner as Peter Yuvol
- Amanda Reyne as Patricia O'Boyle
- Greg Collins as Scott Poluso
- Gary Hershberger as Goodman
- Dana Ashbrook as Kelly Mitich
- Robert Madrid as Jose
- Chris Ufland as Jenkins
- Christopher Michael as Captain Thomas
- Ron Otis as McCarthy

== Critical reception ==
Boa was released to compete with Python II (2002), a sequel to one of the most popular made-for-television snake movies of all time, Python. Boa was a critical failure, with reviews citing bad acting and poor special effects.

== Sequel ==
Boa vs. Python was released after the success of the Python franchise and the failure of Boa; Boa vs. Python was also a critical failure. The filmmakers had decided to make a crossover with Python and Boa, involving the two types of snakes fighting each other. It has been noted that Boa vs. Python was inspired by Alien vs. Predator.

== Release ==
Both the DVD and VHS versions have been out of print as of 2010.

== See also ==
- List of killer snake films
