= Cassie Keller =

Cassie Keller may refer to:

- An actress of The Wicked (2013 film)
- A character in 2007 film R. L. Stine's The Haunting Hour: Don't Think About It
