= Python (film) =

- DVD cover
- Screenplay by: Daniel Knauf; Garrison Hershberger; Paul Bogh
- Story by: Phillip Roth
- Directed by: Richard Clabaugh
- Starring: Jenny McCarthy; Wil Wheaton; Frayne Rosanoff; Casper Van Dien; Robert Englund
- Music by: Daniel J. Nielsen; Mad Bus
- Country of origin: United States
- Original language: English

Production
- Producers: Ken Olandt; Jeffery Beach; Phillip Roth
- Cinematography: Patrick Rousseau
- Editor: Christian McIntire
- Running time: 99 minutes
- Production company: UFO International

Original release
- Release: August 9, 2000

Python (theatrically released in the Philippines as Anaconda 2000) is a 2000 made-for-TV horror film directed by Richard Clabaugh. The film features several cult favorite actors, including William Zabka of The Karate Kid fame, Wil Wheaton, Casper Van Dien, Jenny McCarthy, Keith Coogan, Robert Englund, Dana Barron, David Bowe, and Sean Whalen.

The film concerns a genetically engineered snake, a python, that escapes and unleashes itself on a small town. It was filmed in Los Angeles and Malibu, California.

Python was followed by three sequels: Pythons 2 (2002), New Alcatraz (also known as Boa) and Boa vs. Python (2004), all of which are also made-for-TV films.

== Plot ==
An NSA plane crashes near the town of Ruby after its cargo, an abnormally large reticulated python, escapes confinement. The python survives the crash and attacks a lesbian couple, Lisa Johnson and Roberta Keeler, camping in the woods.

At a swimming hole the next day, John Cooper, his girlfriend Kristin, his best friend Tommy, and Tommy's girlfriend Theresa find Lady G, a pet Burmese python they recognize as belonging to Lisa. Deputy Greg Larston arrives, mentioning that Lisa is missing, and takes Lady G. When Lisa's body is later found heavily disfigured by acid, the police suspect John, who is employed at a plating plant that utilizes acid.

Meanwhile, NSA Special Agent Bart Parker meets with scientist Anton Rudolph while preparing to recapture the python; Anton (who was part of the team that created the creature) explains its origins as a genetically-engineered hybrid of several snake species as well as its defensive capabilities - including being able to expel highly-corrosive stomach acid - and concluding that Parker's men don't stand a chance.

The python kills more people, including real estate agent Kenny Summers and his client Francesca Garibaldi. John discovers the scene and police find the bodies of both Francesca and Roberta in the garage, causing Sheriff Griffin Wade to shut down the plant. When Kenny's body is found with the same acid burns, Wade also orders John arrested.

The NSA team arrive with Anton as a guide, providing Wade with a cover story about the murders being committed by a psychotic rogue operative. Wade does not believe them, but is forced to free John, who had been planning to leave on a vacation with Kristin, Tommy, and Theresa the following morning.

Coordinating with police to set a perimeter around the area where the python is likely to be, the NSA team use radar to locate the python. Believing they've caught the creature sleeping, Parker orders his men to open fire before realizing that the python had used its recently-shed skin as a decoy. The python kills the entire NSA team, including Parker, with Anton as the sole survivor

The next morning, the python attacks Theresa and kills Tommy at their home; Theresa drives away, but the python follows and disables her truck, forcing her to hide in a nearby crevice. John and Kristin go looking for Tommy and Theresa after they fail to arrive and find the wrecked truck; Theresa tries to warn them about the snake, which chases John and Kristin to the water treatment center, where they find both Theresa and a shocked Anton. Realizing that they must do something about the python before it gets to town, John calls Greg on the radio and fills him in on a plan they have devised to trap and destroy the python.

The group lures the python into the water treatment center by having it chase John through a shaft, while they set a bomb near the entrance and John escapes through a hatch too small for the snake; however, the bomb does not detonate when triggered. Anton runs back in to reset it, sacrificing himself by detonating manually when confronted by the python. Though the others celebrate their apparent success, the python emerges unscathed. While fleeing in Greg's police car, the group construct an alternative plan to penetrate the python's hide by luring the python into a vat of acid at the plating plant. They are able to push the python's underbelly into one of the vats, causing the python to be killed by the acid.

Six months later, the plant has been reopened as a bar/bike shop where the death of the python is used as a sales tool; Greg has been accepted into Quantico to be an FBI agent and John gleefully announces that he Kristin are soon to be parents.

== Cast ==
- Frayne Rosanoff as John Cooper
- Robert Englund as Dr. Anton Rudolph
- Casper Van Dien as NSA Special Agent Bart Parker
- William Zabka as Deputy Greg Larston
- Dana Barron as Kristin
- Sara Mornell as Theresa
- Wil Wheaton as Tommy
- Jenny McCarthy as Francesca Garibaldi
- Chris Owens as Brian Cooper
- Sean Whalen as Deputy Lewis Ross
- Gary Grubbs as Sheriff Griffin Wade
- Theo Pagones as Dootsen
- Scott Williamson as Kenny Summers
- David Bowe as Boone
- Keith Coogan as Lenny
- John Franklin as Floyd Fuller
- LoriDawn Messuri as Lisa Johnson
- Kathleen Randazzo as Roberta Keeler
- Ed Lauter as Pilot
- Marc McClure as Dave
- Frank Welker as Python (voice)

== Reception ==
Python was originally broadcast in the United States on August 9, 2000. In the Philippines, the film was theatrically released as Anaconda 2000 on October 25, 2000, connecting it to the unrelated 1997 film Anaconda.

Python received mixed reviews. Critics praised the ensemble cast, but criticized the special effects and plot. Moria Reviews wrote: "The B-budget CGI monster movie is not a particularly distinguished genre but Python surprises as one of the better entries. For one, it is played with a sense of humour that lifts the show considerably over any rough technical patches."

== Sequels ==
Python had three sequels:

- New Alcatraz (2002, also known as Boa) is about a giant prehistoric boa constrictor that is accidentally unleashed into a state-of-the-art prison in Antarctica, during a mining operation. The prison staff, the inmates, and two paleontologists, Dr. Robert Trenton (Dean Cain) and Dr. Jessica Platt-Trenton (Elizabeth Lackey), must band together to escape the prison or become the serpent's prey. The film was considered a critical failure.
- Pythons 2 (2002) has two carnivorous mutant pythons that terrorize a Russian research complex and military base; the Russians and the Americans must work together to destroy the creatures and save themselves.
- Boa vs. Python (2004), directed by David Flores, is a crossover between Python and Boa.

== See also ==
- List of killer python films
