= Stanley Zabka =

American songwriter, filmmaker, and television director

Stanley William Zabka (November 6, 1924 – October 7, 2023) was an American songwriter, filmmaker, and television director, most notably working on NBC's The Tonight Show and The Doctors.

== Early life ==
Born in Des Moines, Iowa, as the sixth of eleven children, Zabka's parents had owned and operated an opera house in Omaha when first married, directing and starring in productions.

He graduated from Bowen High School in Chicago, and later attended the Barnum School of Dramatics in Chicago. He also studied at the University of Illinois and Northwestern University.

== Career ==
Zabka enlisted in the United States Army in 1943, during World War II. After the war, Zabka received a Bachelor of Arts in music and speech from DePauw University in 1949. and worked as a page at NBC in New York, where he collaborated with fellow ex-sergeant Don Upton to write the briefly popular song "Christmas Eve in My Home Town".

Zabka returned to military service in Europe during the Korean War. During this second stint of military service, he served for a time as News Chief for the American Forces Network (AFN) in Europe. During this time, Zabka's song, "Christmas Eve in My Home Town", was recorded by Eddie Fisher in 1954 in a version made exclusively for military personnel, rather than commercial distribution.

After the Korean War, Zabka toured with a travelling orchestra for three months before returning to NBC in an associate director position. Zabka "was a director of NBC's The Tonight Show for 22 years with three different hosts: Steve Allen, then Jack Paar, and finally Johnny Carson. Zabka composed the original theme music for The Tonight Show during Paar's tenure of, and during that time also wrote the theme for the Pulitzer Prize-winning drama Tornado Xenia Ohio – 9:45 p.m. He served as assistant director of The Tonight Show starring Johnny Carson during the first two years of Carson's tenure. On September 1, 1964, Zabka released an album, The Paris Strings Play Zabka's Themes from Television. In 1966, a version of "Christmas Eve in My Home Town" recorded by Kate Smith and published by Zabka through his Big Island Music label was sent by Zabka to 800 Armed Forces Network stations.

On television, Zabka worked on the daytime series The Doctors, and in 1973 was credited as a co-director of the program, which received an Emmy Award during his tenure there. In film, he worked as production manager for the 1982 Chuck Norris movie Forced Vengeance. He also contributed to productions such as Romancing the Stone (1984) and Midnight Run (1988). In 2013, Zabka published a memoir, Razz Ma Tazz: My Life in Music, Television and Film.

== Personal life ==
Zabka and his wife, Nancy, married on August 2, 1964, and had a daughter and two sons, including actor William Zabka. Zabka moved to Alta Sierra, California in 1995, where he lived until his death at age 98.
