= Most (2003 film) =

2003 film by Bobby Garabedian

- Directed by: Bobby Garabedian
- Written by: Bobby Garabedian; William Zabka
- Produced by: Bobby Garabedian; William Zabka
- Starring: Vladimír Javorský; Linda Rybová; Ladislav Ondřej; Klára Issová; Ester Geislerová; Brad Heller
- Cinematography: Michael FitzMaurice
- Edited by: Kveto Hecko; Paul Petschek
- Music by: John Debney
- Release date: 2003
- Running time: 29 minutes
- Country: Czech Republic

Most (English: The Bridge) is a 2003 Czech live action short film directed by Bobby Garabedian, who wrote and produced with William Zabka. The music score was composed by John Debney.

== Plot ==
Most is the story of a single Czech father who takes his eight-year-old son to work with him at the railroad drawbridge where he is the bridge tender.

In the beginning of the film, the boy meets a woman boarding a train who has a drug problem.

Back at the bridge, the father goes into the engine room, and tells his son to stay at the edge of the nearby lake. A ship comes, and the bridge is lifted. Though it is supposed to arrive an hour later, the train happens to arrive early. The son sees this, and tries to warn his father, who is not paying attention and thus unaware of the oncoming train. Just as the oncoming train approaches, the son falls into the drawbridge gearworks while attempting to lower the bridge, leaving the father with a horrific choice to either kill his son or allow the train to crash. The father chooses to lower the bridge, the gears crushing the boy. The people in the train are completely oblivious to the fact that a boy died trying to save them, other than the woman addicted to drugs that the boy had met the day before, who happened to look out her train window.

The movie ends with the man wandering a new city and meeting the former drug-addicted woman, holding a baby which resembles the dead child.

== Christian meaning ==
The film can be seen as a metaphor of God the Father sacrificing his Son for the salvation of men (John 3:16). The fruits of this sacrifice are visible in the film in the young woman leaving her drug addictions and beginning a new life.

== Main cast ==
- Vladimír Javorský as Father
- Ladislav Ondřej as Láďa
- Linda Rybová as Troubled Girl
- Chloe Wilson as Sad Person
- Ester Geislerová as Ester
- Brad Heller as Brad from America
- Klára Issová as Pavlinka
- John Lavachielli

== Awards ==
- 2003 Sundance Film Festival: Official Selection
- Palm Springs International 2003: Winner – Best of Festival
- Maui Film Festival 2003: Winner – Best Short Film; Audience Award – Best Newcomers
- Heartland Film Festival 2003: Winner – Crystal Heart Award
- Nominated for the Academy Award for Best Live Action Short Film.
