= Caitlin Carmichael =

American actress

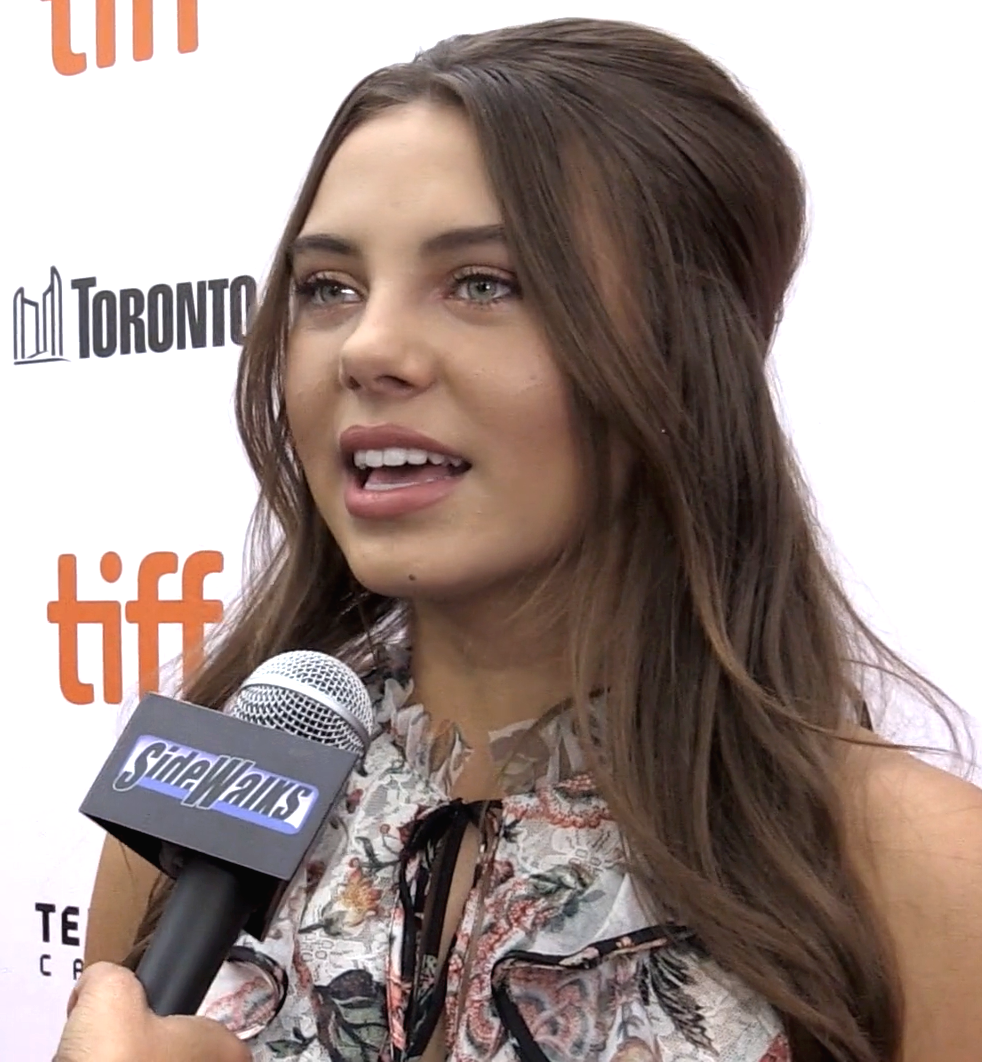
- Carmichael in 2018
- Born: 2004 (age 21–22); Tifton, Georgia, U.S.
- Occupation: Actress
- Years active: 2008–present

Caitlin Carmichael (born 2004) is an American actress. Her credits include In the Motherhood (2008), Criminal Minds (2009), Shake It Up, iCarly, Hot in Cleveland, Law & Order: LA, and Bag of Bones (all 2011), The Wicked (2013), 300: Rise of an Empire (2014), Martyrs (2015), Young Sheldon and The Good Doctor (both 2017), Life Itself (2018), Midnight in the Switchgrass (2021), and Dwight in Shining Armor (2019–2021).

== Life and career ==
Carmichael was born in 2004 in Tifton, Georgia. She made her acting debut as a 3-year-old, in Jenny McCarthy's web series In the Motherhood (2008). Her other early career credits include Shake It Up, iCarly, Hot in Cleveland, Law & Order: LA, and Criminal Minds.

In 2010, she appeared alongside Jack Black in the short comedy film The Mis-Informant.

In 2011, she was nominated Best Performance in a short film by a Young Actress Ten and Under at the 32nd Young Artist Awards, for the short film The Mis-Informant.

In 2012, at the 33rd Young Artist Awards, she was nominated for Best Performance as a Guest in a TV series in Shake It Up and also won Best Performance in a mini-series for her role in Bag of Bones.

In 2019, she played Gretta, a leading character in the BYUtv family fantasy TV show Dwight in Shining Armor.

In 2021, she starred as Tracey Lee in Lionsgate serial killer thriller Midnight in the Switchgrass, in a cast that included Megan Fox, Bruce Willis, and Sistine Stallone.

== Personal life ==
Carmichael enrolled in the University of California, Los Angeles and purportedly, as of July 2021, was the youngest female ever to be accepted into the university at the age of 14. She studied for an American Literature & Culture degree.

In addition to acting, Carmichael spends time taking dance classes (ballet, tap, and hip hop) as well as gymnastics. She also does volunteer work with the Beverly Hills Presbyterian Church, helping feed the homeless.

== Filmography ==
=== Film ===
Year	Title	Role	Notes
2010	Backlight	Jamie	
2010	The Mis-Informant	Bethany	Short
2011	Conception	Lucy	
2012	Forgetting the Girl	Nicole	
2012	Lizzie	Young Lizzie	
2012	Lany's Morning	Little Girl	Short
2013	The Wicked	Amanda Drake	Video
2013	Wiener Dog Nationals	Bridget Jack	
2013	A Country Christmas	Miley Logan	
2014	Shoulder to Shoulder	Rachael	Short
2014	300: Rise of an Empire	Artemisia (age 8)	
2014	Teacher of the Year	Sierra Carter	
2014	Bedbug	Dee	Short
2014	Being American	Angela	
2014	Unmatched	Lucy	Short
2015	Sweetheart	Sweetheart	Short
2015	Wiener Dog Internationals	Bridget Jack	
2015	An American Girl: Grace Stirs Up Success	Maddy	
2015	Operation: Neighborhood Watch!	Rosemary	
2015	Martyrs	Sam	
2015	Monsters	Jenn	Short
2016	A Boy Called Po	Amelia Carr	
2016	The Dandy Warhols: Catcher in the Rye	Phoebe Caulfield	Video short
2016	The Night Visitor 2: Heather's Story	Heather	
2017	A Mermaid's Tale	Ryan	
2017	Wheelman	Katie	
2018	Life Itself	Abby (11-13 Years Old)	
2019	Epiphany	Luka	
2021	Midnight in the Switchgrass	Tracey Lee	

=== Television ===
Year	Title	Role	Notes
2008	In the Motherhood	Sasha	Episode: "Just Shoot Me, Cupid!"
2008	Mystery ER	Madison	Episode: "Dead in Ten/Speed Bump"
2009	Criminal Minds	Louisa Bonner	Episode: "Roadkill"
2010	10 Things I Hate About You	Young Bianca Stratford	Episode: "The Winner Takes It All"
2011	Shake It Up	Eileen Keller	Episode: "Glitz It Up"
2011	Hot in Cleveland	Annabelle	Episode: "Elka's Snowbird"
2011	iCarly	Molly	Episode: "iPity the Nevel"
2011	Special Agent Oso	Athena (voice)	Episode: "Quatum of Celery/Drink Another Day"
2011	Law & Order: LA	Lily Winters	Episode: "Zuma Canyon"
2011	True Blood	Little Girl	2 episodes
2011	It's Always Sunny in Philadelphia	Samantha	Episode: "Frank Reynold's Little Beauties"
2011	Dexter	Ella	Episode: "Just Let Go"
2011	CSI: Miami	Tori Haverford	Episode: "Crowned"
2011	Bag of Bones	Kyra Devore	Main role
2012	Supermoms	Lily	TV series
2012	Bad Girls	Piper Patterson	Television film
2012	Daybreak	8-year-old Girl	Episode: "Chapter 5"
2012	Retired at 35	Chelsea	Episode: "The Grifters"
2012	The Neighbors	Emma	Episode: "Halloween-ween"
2012	The Dog Who Saved the Holidays	Kara Bannister	Television film
2012–2020	Doc McStuffins	Alma (voice)	Recurring role
2013	Vegas	Geena Everson	Episode: "The Third Man"
2013	Criminal Minds	Kylie Carpenter	Episode: "In the Blood"
2013–2014	Chosen	Ellie Mitchell	Main role
2014	Suburgatory	Paris	Episode: "No, You Can't Sit with Us"
2014	The Legend of Korra	Tuyen (voice)	Episode: "The Calling"
2015	Agent Carter	Young Anya	Episode: "The Iron Ceiling"
2015	Portrait of Love	Jess Dwyer	Television film
2016	The Loud House	Kat (voice)	"Lincoln Loud Girl Guru/Come Sale Away"
2016	Z Nation	Young Lucy	Episode: "Duel"
2017	Chicken Girls	Laney Raymond	Recurring role (season 1)
2018	Young Sheldon	Veronica (age 14)	Schoolgirl
2018	The Good Doctor	Riley Mulloy	Patient
2019–2021	Dwight in Shining Armor	Gretta	Main role
