= Alex Jolig =

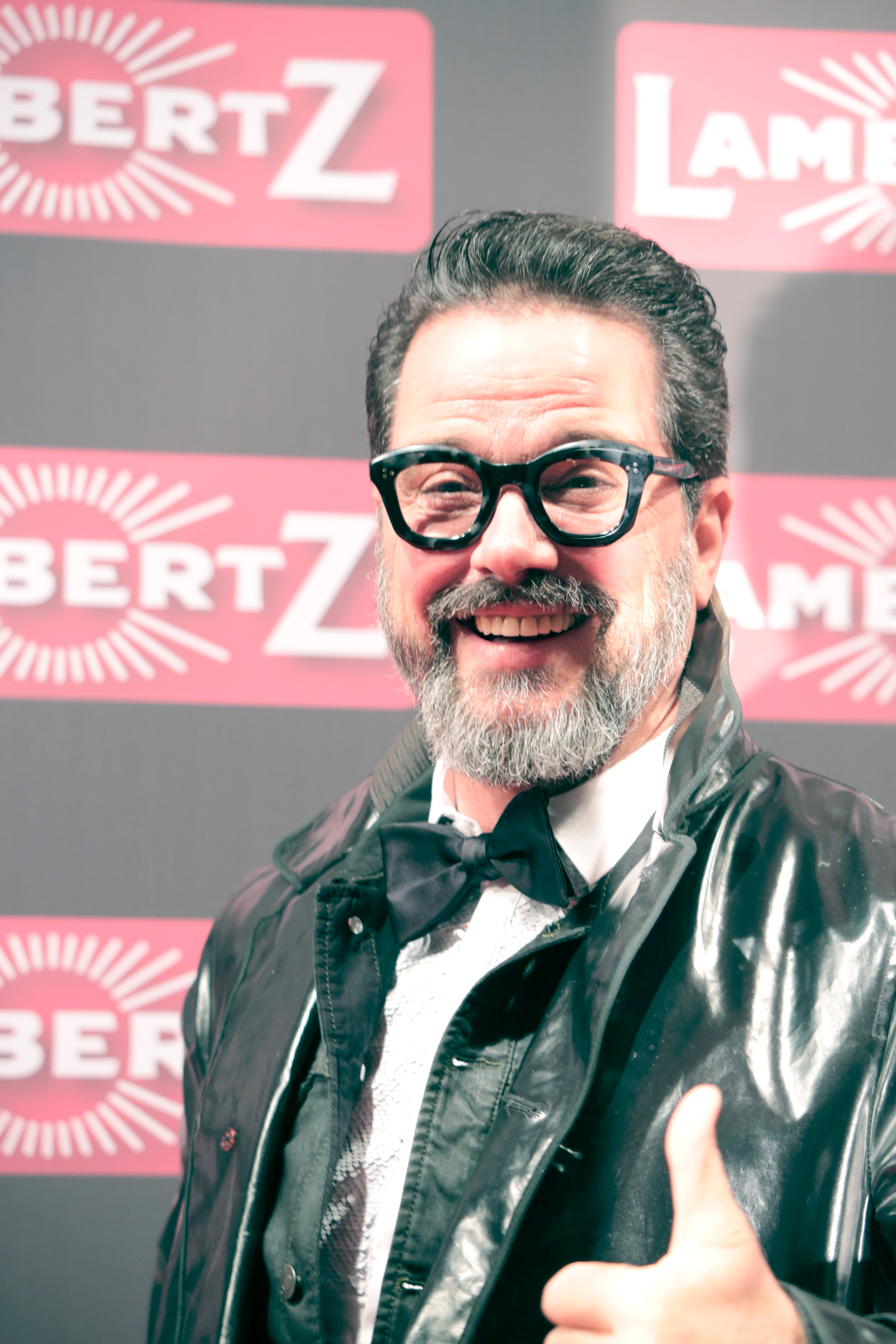
- Alex Jolig in 2018

Background information
- Birth name: Alexander Jolig
- Born: January 14, 1963 (age 62)
- Origin: Stuttgart, West Germany
- Occupation(s): Actor, singer, motorcycle racer
- Instrument: Vocals
- Labels: Warner Bros. Records
- Website: www.alex-jolig.de

Alexander Jolig (born January 14, 1963, Stuttgart), better known by his stage name Alex, is a German actor, singer, and motorcycle racer.

Once a housemate in Big Brother Germany reality show on RTL II, he became famous in Europe and also internationally with his hit songs Ich will nur dich and Willst du...?. The former reached #3 and stood there for 10 weeks in Germany, #5 for 9 weeks in Austria, and #15 for 7 weeks in Switzerland, but the latter was less successful and reached #46 for 3 weeks in German charts.

Alex is an actor, known for Python 2 (2002), Interceptor Force 2 (2002), and Sperling (1996). He has been married to Britt since 2012. He was previously married to Sandra Mahnkopp. Currently working at 9.91 Radio, and has a book on the way, "A Life In The Big Brother House". The release date is yet to be announced.

The interesting thing about his music career is that most of his fans, about 80 percent, are from Iran, which was shown on his Instagram account in a documentary made by Bamdad Esmaeili for Radio farda TV network in 2017. He also said he started his music career just for fun, and he didn't think that he would become so popular, but then he had to choose between his company and music, which he the company because he cared more about it.

He has a son with his ex-girlfriend.

He has a spouse.

Owned two local Hip Restaurants in Bonn which he handed over to his younger brother.

He took part in March 2008 HyperMania in Dubai, UAE.

== Filmography ==
Year	Title	Role
2003	Sperling	
2002	Interceptor Force 2	Bjorn Hatch
2002	Python 2	Matthew Coe
2002	Hyper Sonic	David Diedrich
