= Greg Collins (American football) =

American football player and actor (born 1952)

No. 55, 50
- Position: Linebacker

Personal information
- Born: December 8, 1952 (age 73); Troy, Michigan, U.S.
- Listed height: 6 ft 3 in (1.91 m)
- Listed weight: 228 lb (103 kg)

Career information
- High school: Brother Rice
- College: Notre Dame
- NFL draft: 1975: 2nd round, 35th overall pick

Career history
- San Francisco 49ers (1975); Seattle Seahawks (1976); Buffalo Bills (1977)

Awards and highlights
- National champion (1973); First-team All-American (1974)
- Stats at Pro Football Reference

Gregory Vincent Collins (born December 8, 1952) is an American character actor and former professional football player. He played in the National Football League (NFL) as a linebacker for three seasons from 1975 to 1977.

== Early life ==
Collins was born in Troy, Michigan. He played college football for the Notre Dame Fighting Irish, and played on their 1973 national championship team under Ara Parseghian.

== Career ==
During his career in the NFL, Collins played for the San Francisco 49ers, the Seattle Seahawks and the Buffalo Bills.

As an actor he has appeared in films, including 976-EVIL, The Rock and New Alcatraz, and television shows, including 24, and True Blood. He also had four appearances in Full House as Second Prisoner, Tough Guy, and Sy. He also had an appearance on The Jeff Foxworthy Show as a dry ice delivery man.

== Filmography ==
=== Film ===
Year	Title	Role	Notes
1988	976-EVIL	Mr. Selby	
1989	Police Academy 6: City Under Siege	SWAT Team Leader	
1990	Sibling Rivalry	Hotel Security Guard	
1991	Eve of Destruction	Skaaren	
1992	Class Act	Cop	
1992	Cool World	Cop	
1994	Caroline at Midnight	Bartender	
1994	Angel 4: Undercover	Doo-Rag Bouncer	
1995	Houseguest	Cop	
1995	Under Siege 2: Dark Territory	Huey Pilot	
1995	The Tie That Binds	Bartender	
1995	Crosscut	Victor	
1996	The Rock	Private Gamble	
1996	Independence Day	Military Aide	
1996	Solo	Scanlon	
1996	Walnut Creek	Anthony DePrince	
1997	Turbo: A Power Rangers Movie	Warrior #2	
1997	The 6th Man	Ref #1	
1997	Con Air	Guard	
1997	Double Tap	Nunns	
1998	Surface to Air	Major Canton	
1998	Godzilla	Soldier on Bridge	
1998	Armageddon	Halsey	
1998	Operation Delta Force 3: Clear Target	Mac McKinney	
1998	Enemy of the State	FBI Supervisor	
1999	Operation Delta Force 4: Deep Fault	Skip Lang	
2000	U.S. Seals	Cosgrove	
2000	Ready to Rumble	Crusty Veteran Cop	
2000	Gone in 60 Seconds	San Pedro Cop	
2000	Coyote Ugly	Coyote Ugly Bar Patron	
2001	Venomous	Grover	
2001	New Alcatraz	Scott Poluso	
2002	Collateral Damage	FBI Agent Collin	
2003	Daredevil	Fisk Bodyguard	
2003	Detonator	Security Guard	
2003	Bruce Almighty	Coach Tucker	
2003	An American Reunion	DEA Agent	
2004	Cellular	Aging Security Guard	
2004	Dynamite	Dave	
2005	The Rain Makers	Dalton	
2005	Randall Miller	Paramedic #1	
2005	Wheelmen	Agent #4	
2006	World Trade Center	Will's Rescue Fireman	
2007	Nobel Son	Foreman	
2007	Protecting the King	NY Policeman	
2008	Bottle Shock	Trucker	
2008	Eagle Eye	Two Star General	
2008	Necessary Evil	Michael Russo	
2009	Fast & Furious	Lead Investigator	
2010	My Name Is Khan	Judge Preston	
2011	A Warrior's Heart	First Policeman	
2012	A Thousand Words	Construction Worker	
2013	Along the Roadside	Traffic Cop	
2013	The Wicked	Dr. James Reese	
2014	50 to 1	Jockey Official	
2015	Straight Outta Compton	Joe Louis Police	

=== Television ===
Year	Title	Role	Notes
1984	Webster	Football Player	Episode: "You Can't Go Home Again"
1984	Knots Landing	Swain #3	Episode: "Distant Locations"
1984–1989	Falcon Crest	Various roles	4 episodes
1985	The A-Team	Boxer Billy Marquette	Episode: "Champ!"
1985	George Burns Comedy Week	Vernon	Episode: "The Couch"
1986	Annihilator	Policeman	Television film
1987	Perfect Strangers	Security Guard #2	Episode: "Taking Stock"
1987	L.A. Law	Baliff	2 episodes
1988	Houston Knights	SWAT Two	Episode: "Burnout"
1988	Hooperman	Man Assaulting Hooperman	Episode: "Nick Derringer, P.I."
1988	Out of Time	Cop #2	Television film
1988	The Hogan Family	Handler	Episode: "Animal House"
1988, 1989	Cheers	Greg / Exterminator #1	2 episodes
1990	The Bradys	Track Security Guard	Episode: "The Brady 300"
1990	Father Dowling Mysteries	Chip	Episode: "The Medical Mystery"
1990–1995	Full House	Various roles	4 episodes
1990, 1995	Days of Our Lives	Stripper #3 / Burly Guy	2 episodes
1991	Hunter	Dendrix	Episode: "The Grab"
1991	Paradise	Bellamy	Episode: "Twenty-Four Hours"
1991	P.S. I Luv U	Megan	Episode: "The Honeymooners"
1991, 1995	Sisters	Various roles	2 episodes
1992	Jake and the Fatman	Manager	Episode: "Mickey Daytona"
1992	Crazy About the Movies: Ava Gardner	Narrator	Television film
1993	Renegade	Mick Casper	Episode: "Billy"
1993	Home Improvement	Roy	Episode: "Karate or Not, Here I Come"
1992	Lois & Clark: The New Adventures of Superman	Man #2	Episode: "Pilot"
1994	Mad About You	Sergio	Episode: "The Late Show"
1995	Get Smart	The Marine	Episode: "Goodbye Ms. Chip"
1995	Hope & Gloria	Stripper	Episode: "No Degrees of Separation"
1995	Family Matters	Officer Miller	Episode: "My Bodyguard"
1995	Into the Paradise	Schrader	Television film
1995	Dead Weekend	TWF #2	Television film
1995	Sharon's Secret	First Officer	Television film
1995	The Jeff Foxworthy Show	Ice deliverer	Episode: "With Two You Get Cow's Milk"
1996	Seinfeld	Policeman	Episode: "The Calzone"
1996	Ellen	Agent Chamberlain	Episode: "When the Vow Breaks: Part 1"
1996	Once You Meet a Stranger	Security Guard	Television film
1998	Boy Meets World	Freezing Guy	Episode: "The Eskimo"
1999	L.A. Doctors	Prison Guard #1	Episode: "The Life Lost in Living"
1999	Martial Law	Gibson	Episode: "Red Storm"
1999	Angel	Keith	Episode: "Rm w/a Vu"
1999, 2002	The Bold and the Beautiful	Officer Griffith / Officer Yort	2 episodes
2000–2001	CSI: Crime Scene Investigation	Officer Arvington	4 episodes
2001	The District	Officer Duane Reston	Episode: "A Southern Town"
2001	Felicity	Bouncer	Episode: "Girlfight"
2001	FreakyLinks	Cop #2	Episode: "Subject: Police Siren"
2001	Alias	Kenny	Episode: "Truth Be Told"
2002	Crossing Jordan	Construction Worker	Episode: "Four Fathers"
2002	Robbery Homicide Division	Scotty Earl Klayman	Episode: "Had"
2003	Miracles	Larsen	Episode: "Little Miss Lost"
2003	Tremors	Lynch	Episode: "Ghost Dance"
2003	JAG	American Soldier	Episode: "Shifting Sands"
2003	The Handler	Ernie	Episode: "Body of Evidence"
2004	The Division	Gerald Mitchell	Episode: "Hail, Hail, the Gang's All Here"
2004	The Young and the Restless	Airport Guard	2 episodes
2005	House	Marshal Brady	Episode: "Mob Rules"
2005	Supernatural	CIA Agent Di Dinato	Television film
2006	Windfall	Gym Teacher	Episode: "The Myth of More"
2006	Justice	Sheriff Ray Hayes	Episode: "Behind the Orange Curtain"
2006	Dead and Deader	Captain Niles	Television film
2008	CSI: Miami	U.S. Marshal	Episode: "Ambush"
2008	State of the Union	Dance club employee	Episode #1.3
2008	The Cleaner	Sergeant Rayson	Episode: "Pilot"
2008, 2010	Criminal Minds	Bill Codwin / Captain Warner	2 episodes
2009	How I Met Your Mother	Matt Zinman	Episode: "Benefits"
2009	Leverage	Lt. Stone	Episode: "The Snow Job"
2009	The Secret Life of the American Teenager	Grumpy Guy	Episode: "Money for Nothing, Chicks for Free"
2009	Valentine	Cop	Episode: "She's Gone"
2009	True Blood	Gabe	4 episodes
2009	Dollhouse	Molester / Older Man	2 episodes
2010	24	Captain Ravello	Episode: "Day 8: 6:00 p.m.-7:00 p.m."
2010	Chuck	General Bauer	Episode: "Chuck Versus the American Hero"
2010	Entourage	Police Officer	Episode: "Lose Yourself"
2010	NCIS: Los Angeles	Michael Barnes	Episode: "Anonymous"
2011	The Office	Assassin	Episode: "Threat Level Midnight"
2011	No Ordinary Family	Armed Guard	Episode: "No Ordinary Beginning"
2011	Law & Order: LA	Sgt. Blaine	Episode: "Plummer Park"
2011	The Guild	Greg Collins	2 episodes
2011	Dragon Age: Redemption	Brom	Episode: "Tallis"
2011	Private Practice	Detective	Episode: "Step One"
2011	Workaholics	Dean	Episode: "Karl's Wedding"
2012	Dirty Work	Harris	Episode: "Beast"
2012	Perception	SWAT Leader	Episode: "Cipher"
2012	Revenge	Mick	Episode: "Illusion"
2013	Family Tools	Bug Guy #1	Episode: "Pest Side Story"
2013	Hawaii Five-0	Victor Wyatt	Episode: "A ia la aku"
2014	The After	Large Man	Television film
2014–2016	Jane the Virgin	Lieutenant Armstrong	12 episodes
2015	How to Get Away with Murder	Police Officer #3	Episode: "She's a Murderer"
2015	Ray Donovan	Roman	Episode: "One Night in Yerevan"
2015	Code Black	Sheriff Adams	Episode: "The Sun Rises"
2016	Lucifer	Traffic Cop	Episode: "Pilot"
2016	The People v. O. J. Simpson	Sheriff's Deputy	Episode: "The Dream Team"
2016	Major Crimes	Deputy Erin Simms	3 episodes
2017	Rounds	Bancroft	Episode: "Pilot"
2017	NCIS	Metro Police Officer	Episode: "Pandora's Box, Part I"
2017	Law & Order True Crime	Bodyguard #1	Episode: "The Menendez Murders: Episode 1"
2017	Runaways	Howard	Episode: "Reunion"
2018	S.W.A.T.	Crockett	Episode: "Contamination"
2019	Tacoma FD	Mr. Gravatti	Episode: "The B-Team"
2019	L.A.'s Finest	Warden	Episode: "Déjà Vu"
2019	Too Old to Die Young	Detective Gomez	Episode: "The Devil"
2019	Threat Level Midnight: The Movie	Assassin	Television short
2020	Ratched	Police Officer	Episode: "The Bucket List"
