= Evan Hofer =

American actor

- Born: May 8, 1997 (age 29); Leavenworth, Kansas, U.S.
- Occupation: Actor

Evan Hofer (born May 8, 1997) is an American actor born in Leavenworth, Kansas, United States. He is recognized for portraying the role of Dex Heller on General Hospital, as well as several other television appearances.

== Career ==
From 2019 to 2021, Hofer played the character Prince Chlodwig in Dwight in Shining Armor. Chlodwig was a recurring character on the fantasy along with Gretta, Dwight and Baldric.

In April 2022, it was announced Hofer had joined the cast of General Hospital in the role of Dex Heller; He made his first appearance during the May 6 episode. On December 13, 2024, he exited the role, following the character's death. In press interviews, Hofer revealed he was informed of the decision by executive producer Frank Valentini, with Soap Opera Digest calling the exit a "storyline-dictated move".

In 2026, Hofer appeared in an episode of the 9-1-1 spin-off 9-1-1: Nashville as a guest role, effective February 26, 2026.
