= Dogs Don't Wear Pants =

2019 film by J-P Valkeapää

- Theatrical release poster
- Finnish: Koirat eivät käytä housuja
- Directed by: J-P Valkeapää
- Written by: J-P Valkeapää; Juhana Lumme
- Produced by: Aleksi Bardy; Helen Vinogradov
- Starring: Pekka Strang; Krista Kosonen; Ilona Huhta; Jani Volanen; Oona Airola; Iiris Anttila; Ester Geislerová
- Cinematography: Pietari Peltola
- Edited by: Mervi Junkkonen
- Music by: Michal Nejtek
- Production companies: Helsinki-filmi; Tasse Film
- Distributed by: SF Film Finland
- Release dates: 21 May 2019 (Cannes); 1 November 2019 (Finland)
- Running time: 105 minutes
- Country: Finland
- Language: Finnish

Dogs Don't Wear Pants (Finnish: Koirat eivät käytä housuja) is a 2019 Finnish erotic black comedy film directed by J-P Valkeapää. It was screened in the Directors' Fortnight section at the 2019 Cannes Film Festival.

== Plot ==
Seven years after his wife tragically drowned, heart surgeon Juha finds himself emotionally distant as he raises his teenage daughter Elli alone. He uses a dress and perfume belonging to his wife while masturbating. When a chance encounter with Mona, a dominatrix, brings him closer than ever before to feeling something again, he finds himself entering the world of BDSM. He enjoys being asphyxiated as this causes him to have hallucinations of being under water with his wife. His initial encounter appears non-consensual, with little negotiation between the two. However, Mona gives him a ball to hold when strangling him, so if he starts to lose consciousness the ball will drop and she will know to stop. He gives the woman his wife's dress and perfume to wear.

Juha walks away from his work at a hospital smashing a door when his pass card fails to work. He fails to go to his daughter's concert in favour of seeing Mona. He tricks her into continuing the asphyxiation for too long and he passes out. She gives first aid and calls an ambulance (she is a physical therapist by day, so she has medical training).

Elli arrives at the hospital, distressed. Juha says he saw her mother and tells her to leave. A colleague tells him the Board is concerned about his behaviour and want to do a psychological evaluation on him. Whilst this conversation takes place, Juha pulls his own damaged thumb nail off.

Juha continues to pursue Mona relentlessly, but she refuses his calls. One night, Juha stalks a person he believes is Mona but is actually a man who pepper-sprays Juha. He later takes his daughter's music teacher out to dinner and gives her his wife's perfume. They end up at her place and have sex. He asks her to wear the perfume and strangle him. She goes along with this but also finds it funny.

Juha follows Mona once more, this time to her flat, where he gives her an ultimatum: she can hurt him as much as she likes, provided that she strangles him in exchange. She agrees and he follows her upstairs on all fours. She ties him up and announces she will remove one of his teeth with a pair of pliers. He initially refuses but then relents. She pulls out a tooth after some struggle. She then wraps his face in cling film. Finally, she realises that he came after her with the intention of killing himself. She frees him and starts sobbing. Juha comforts Mona and they kiss, before he slaps her. She shuts herself in another room, but by the time she returns holding his wife's dress, he has left.

Juha returns home where his daughter is absent. He finds Elli in a park, smoking, and attempts to repair their relationship by inviting her to the Natural History Museum, like they used to do on her birthday. Elli then goes off on her boyfriend's moped.

Juha hears that his psychological evaluation came back clear and he tells his colleague he lied. Later, he goes to a BDSM club, dressed in fetish gear. After a few drinks at the bar, he gets on the dance floor and enjoys himself. As Mona walks in, he grins at her and she smiles back.

== Cast ==
- Pekka Strang as Juha
- Krista Kosonen as Mona
- Ilona Huhta as Elli
- Jani Volanen as Pauli
- Oona Airola as Satu
- Iiris Anttila as Lävistäjä
- Ester Geislerová as Vaimo

== Reception ==
On review aggregator website Rotten Tomatoes, the film holds an approval rating of 90% based on 30 reviews, with an average rating of 7.5/10. The website's critics consensus reads: "Dogs Don't Wear Pants will be too intense for many viewers, but for those who can take the punishment, there's pleasure in this stark drama's pain."
