= Linda Rybová =

Czech actress (born 1975)

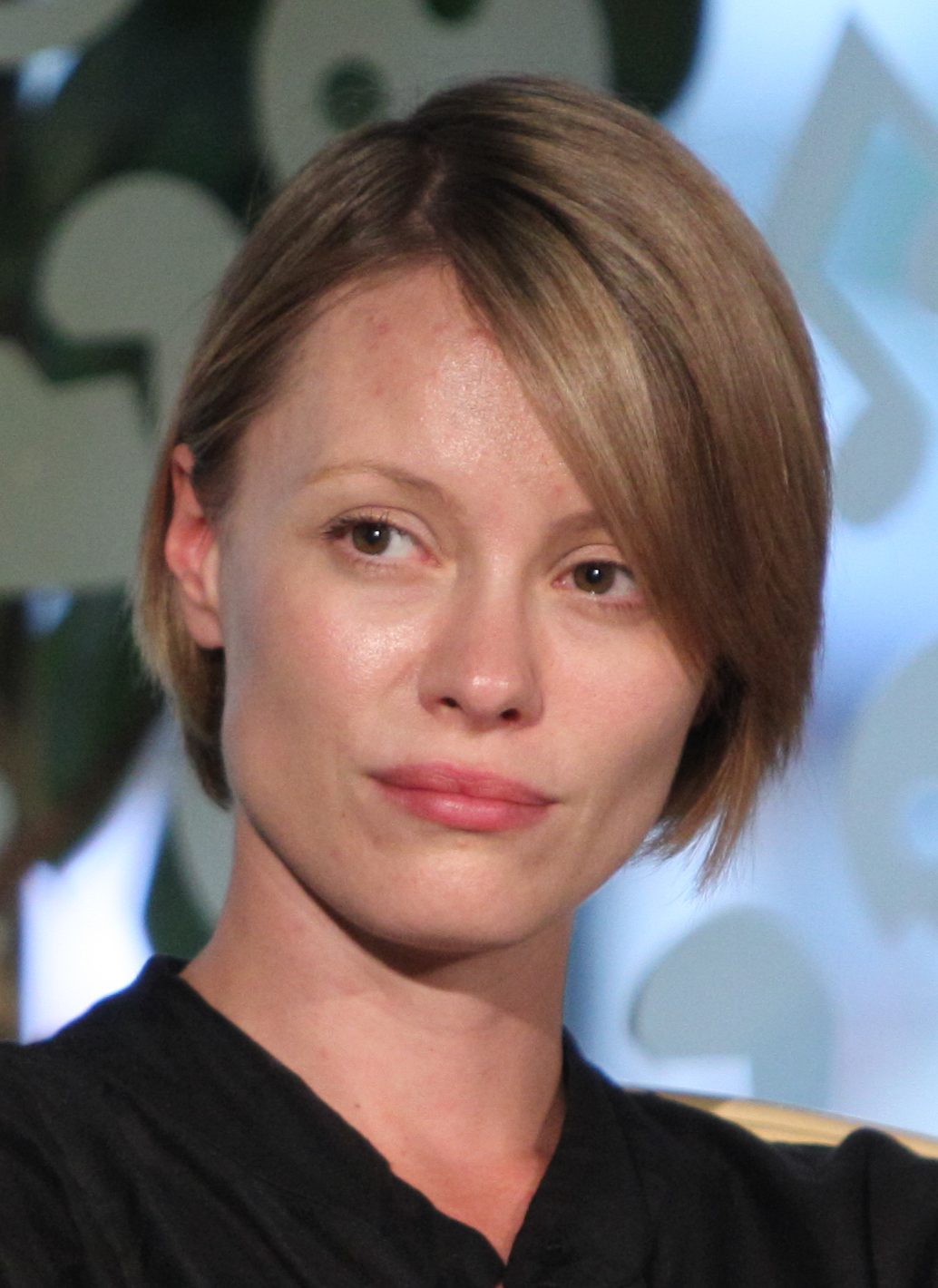
- Linda Rybová (2009)
- Born: 15 October 1975 (age 50); Prague, Czechoslovakia
- Occupation: Actress
- Years active: 1989–present
- Spouse: David Prachař
- Children: 3

Linda Rybová (born 15 October 1975) is a Czech actress. She appeared in more than thirty films since 1989.

She voiced Sarah Angelo in the Czech dub of the 2002 action-adventure video game Mafia.

== Selected filmography ==
Film
Year	Title	Role	Notes
2025	Sea of Hope	Anežka	
2003	Most		
2001	Dark Blue World		
2001	Swimming Pool		
1993	Big Beat		
1993	The Trial		
