= Boa vs. Python =

American science fiction horror film

- DVD cover
- Written by: Chase Parker; Sam Wells
- Directed by: David Flores
- Starring: David Hewlett; Jaime Bergman; Kirk B.R. Woller; Adam Kendrick; Angel Boris
- Music by: Jamie Christopherson
- Country of origin: United States
- Original language: English

Production
- Producers: Jeffery Beach; Phillip Roth
- Cinematography: Lorenzo Senatore
- Editor: Ayton Davis
- Running time: 92 minutes
- Production companies: Columbia TriStar Home Entertainment; UFO International

Original release
- Network: Sci Fi Channel
- Release: May 22, 2004

Related
- New Alcatraz (2002, also known as Boa)

Boa vs. Python is a 2004 science fiction horror film. It was directed by David Flores, from a script by Chase Parker and Sam Wells, and was filmed in Sofia, Bulgaria. In the film, an FBI agent seeks help from a herpetologist and a marine biologist to release a specially bred Boa to hunt a gigantic Python that has been attacking humans. The film is a crossover between Python (2000) and its indirect sequel New Alcatraz (2002, also known as Boa).

== Plot ==
Two masked wrestlers, one named "Boa" the other "Python", are grappling in Atlantic City, New Jersey. Enjoying this spectacle is multi-millionaire casino owner Broddick (Adam Kendrick) and his girlfriend Eve (Angel Boris). Their night out is interrupted by a phone call. The caller, Ramon informs Broddick at York, Pennsylvania that his "package" has arrived overseas from South America and is being delivered. Broddick is delighted and promises lucrative compensation to Ramon for his work.

During the journey, the contents inside the back of the truck has awakened and become enraged. Ramon stops the convoy and gets a tranquilizer gun, ordering a panel to be opened. Unfortunately, a serpentine tail smashes through the panel and begins to wreak havoc. One of the men is startled and fires his gun, accidentally hitting the main control circuit on the back of the truck. The main door of the sealed container opens, and an abnormally large, nightmarish reticulated python, about 80 ft (24 m) long and 12 t (26,000 lb) in weight, emerges and kills the group. Ramon detonates a bomb in the process, destroying the convoy, but the snake survives.

Broddick reveals his plan to bring extreme big-game hunting to the city, as yet another pastime for the mega-wealthy, and the python is to be the quarry. Broddick then sees a news report detailing the destruction of Ramon's convoy. Now realizing the python has escaped, Broddick decides to bring his big-game hunting associates to their prey.

24 miles outside Philadelphia, FBI Agent Alan Sharpe (Kirk B.R. Woller) investigates the wrecked convoy and discovers a large snake scale on the wreckage. Quickly realizing what he is up against (Agent Sharpe is familiar with the events in the film Python), Sharpe is determined to prevent the snake from killing more people. He enlists herpetologist Dr. Steven Emmett (David Hewlett) and marine biologist Monica Bonds (Jaime Bergman) to devise a plan to stop the python. They plan to merge Monica's dolphin-camera headgear and tracking system to Dr. Emmett's giant 70 ft (21 m) long, 11.5 t (25,000 lb), genetically enhanced Scarlet Boa named Betty. They hope Betty will seek out and kill the python.

The trio, now joined by a backup team of FBI agents and US Army soldiers, transports Betty to the water treatment facility. She quickly enters and begins to track the python. The tracking system proves faulty, providing only sporadic coverage.

Broddick and his surviving hunters enter the opposite end of the treatment facility and begin to track the reptile. They are surprised when they stumble upon a nest of eggs, guarded by Betty, whom they had not expected to see. Betty constricts Eve, killing her, which causes Broddick to snap. Eventually, he makes his way out alone, the rest of his team being killed by both snakes; in the process Sharpe is accidentally killed by one of the hunters. Broddick finally meets up with Dr. Emmett and Monica. The python devours the eggs, enraging Betty, who engages the python in a fight.

Broddick is taken into custody. The tracking system starts to function again, and Dr. Emmett finally sees Betty's nest. He decides to go back into the treatment facility to save the nest. Monica goes with him. Broddick, however, has sneaked away and commandeered an APC. Dr. Emmett and Monica, using the tracking system, track Betty to a nightclub. Betty smashes through the floor, as does the giant python. The two snakes grab Broddick and, in a vicious and bloody tug-of-war, bisect him, each devouring their half. The two snakes continue their battle underneath the disco, with Dr. Emmett and Monica hot on their trail.

The battling snakes end up fighting on subway tracks, but a train is about to run over both combatants. Betty is saved by Dr. Emmett, who activates an electrical spike device he implanted into her head. The shock throws her off the tracks just as the speeding bullet train slams into and decapitates the python. Dr. Emmett and Monica celebrate the death of the python, but become concerned when it is revealed Betty has crawled away. The duo heads back into the treatment facility to bring Betty and her remaining eggs home.

== Cast ==
- David Hewlett as Dr. Steven Emmett
- Jaime Bergman as Monica Bonds
- Kirk B.R. Woller as FBI Agent Alan Sharpe
- Adam Kendrick as Broddick
- Angel Boris as Eve
- Marianne Stanicheva as FBI Agent Koznetova
- Griff Furst as James Danner
- Ivo Naidenov as Littlefield
- George R. Sheffey as Mr. Danner
- Atanas Srebrev as Mr. Foley
- Harry Anichkin as "Tex"
- Jeff Rank as Kent Humphries
- Asen Blatechki as Ramon
- Jonas Talkington as Deputy
- Velizar Binev as Louis

== Release ==
The film was released on DVD by Columbia Tristar on August 24, 2004. Tristar would later re-release the film on September 20 later that year and on October 1, 2007. It was later released by Sony Pictures Home Entertainment as a part of a multi-film pack, which included Chupacabra Terror, Frankenfish, and Lake Placid 3.

== Reception ==
Boa vs. Python was panned by reviewers, who criticized the acting, special effects, and storyline. It has been called a rip-off of Alien vs. Predator (2004) and an attempt to cash in on the popularity of the more popular Python (2000). Reel Film.com awarded the film one and a half out of four stars, criticizing the film's special effects, and expressed disappointment with the film's lack of suitable violence.

== See also ==
- List of killer snake films
