= Dwight in Shining Armor =

Family fantasy television show on BYUtv

- Genre: Fantasy
- Created by: LeeAnne H. Adams & Brian J. Adams
- Country of origin: United States
- Original language: English
- No. of seasons: 5
- No. of episodes: 50

Production
- Running time: 22–24 minutes

Original release
- Network: BYUtv
- Release: March 18, 2019 – May 23, 2021

Dwight in Shining Armor is an American family fantasy television show created by LeeAnne H. Adams & Brian J. Adams that premiered on BYUtv on March 18, 2019. The show features a present-day teenager who awakens a princess from a 1,000-year magical slumber. The show has five ten-episode seasons. In June 2019 the series was approved for two more seasons. On February 16, 2021, BYUtv announced that season 5 of Dwight would premiere in March 2021 and would be the final season.

== Plot ==
Dwight is a present-day teenager who falls into an ancient, underground chamber. He lands on Gretta, a Gothic princess who has been magically sleeping for a thousand years. Dwight inadvertently kisses Gretta, breaking the magic spell.

This action also awakens her court magician, Baldric, as well as scores of medieval villains and makes Dwight her de facto champion until her hordes of enemies are defeated.

Dwight must deal with new role as protector while helping Gretta assimilate into high school life.

== Cast and characters ==
- Sloane Morgan Siegel as Dwight, described as a model Generation Z kid: sensitive, open-minded, health-conscious, responsible and non-confrontational. He's not really interested in becoming a rough and tough champion. If he has to do this job, he's going to do it his way.
- Caitlin Carmichael as Gretta who comes from a rough and tough gothic war zone. She has no way of understanding 21st-century manners or political climate and she's not really interested in adapting as all the problems from her world have followed her. She is described as more Wonder Woman than fairy tale princess.
- Joel McCrary as Baldric the court magician who placed the spell on Gretta as a last ditch effort to save her life. He is not fond of Dwight as a champion, but is extremely protective of Gretta.
- Danielle Bisutti as Witch Hexela. Hexela and Baldric have a complicated past as former lovers. Hexela originally only desires to keep her youth. However, when she reconciles with Baldric and Gretta she decides to join the team to keep Gretta safe. She uses her magic to keep the team out of trouble whenever the most dire situations arrive.
- Evan Hofer as Chlodwig. Chlodwig was originally Gretta's fiancé. Eventually the two agree to be friends and he becomes good friends with Dwight. When the situation arrives, he trains Dwight in knighthood, but his clumsiness tends to put the group in more comedic situations than they hope to contend with.

== Episodes ==
Season	Episodes	Originally released	
Season	Episodes	First released	Last released
1	10	March 18, 2019	May 20, 2019
2	10	September 22, 2019	November 24, 2019
3	10	March 15, 2020	May 24, 2020
4	10	September 20, 2020	November 22, 2020
5	10	March 21, 2021	May 23, 2021

=== Season 1 (2019) ===
No. overall	No. in season	Title	Directed by	Written by	Original release date
1	1	"Pilot"	Timothy J. Kendall	LeeAnne H. Adams & Brian J. Adams	March 18, 2019
Dwight is an average ordinary everyday pacifist who always wants to help. One day he goes into the woods to gather supplies for an upcoming festival, but when he falls into an ancient tomb he awakens the Princess Gretta with an accidental kiss. Now Dwight must learn ways to protect the princess from goblins, magic, ex-knight boyfriends and many other surprises he never expected. Introducing: Sloane Morgan Siegel as Dwight, Caitlin Carmichael as Gretta, Joel McCrary as Baldric, Evan Hofer as Chlodwig, Drew Scheid as Charles (Glee Club President), Jessica Craig as Juliet. Guest stars: Voltaire Council as Mick, Shiela Cochran as Realtor, Annie Jamison as Teacher, Nichole Jamison as Student, Jenne Kang as PTA Mom, John Kap as Troll King, Luna Monroe as Student/Bingo Assistant, Dave Stone as Renissance Kilt Guy, Alpha Trivette as Farmer 1, Lucia Scarano as Principal, Troy Wood as Teacher and Michael Rendiero as Troll 3
2	2	"Flip"	Jeffrey Hunt	LeeAnne H. Adams & Brian J. Adams	March 25, 2019
Jacopo the traveling Troubadour awakens from the Champions Spell and demands Gretta relinquish her throne. After she refuses he uses his magical lute to hypnotize the entire community of Woodside to his will. Can Dwight and company find a way to defeat this trickster? Introducing: Josh Breslow as Jacopo, Bonita Friedericy as Nana. Guest stars: John Forker as Medieval Peasant, Michael McDonough as Home Room Student, Baylee Self as Staree Eyed Student, Anthony Lovato as Science Teacher and as unnamed cast members Baylee Self and Carolyn Koskan
3	3	"Peanut"	Jeffrey Hunt	LeeAnne H. Adams & Brian J. Adams	April 1, 2019
Dwight is put in charge of a loveable little dog named Peanut, but Gretta and Baldric suspect he is actually an abominable monster in disguise. Which side will end up being right? Gretta invites Chlodwig to stay in her hermit hut and reveals to Dwight that she and Chlodwig are actually cousins. Introducing: Jazmine Shaw as Sophie. Guest stars: Gabriel Casdorph as Mr. Mitchell, Chantel Flanders as Dog Mommy, Cherie Julander as Linda, Kenna Lynn Stewart as Pet Shop Employee and Martin Lynch III as unnamed cast member.
4	4	"Lotions and Potions"	James Larkin	LeeAnne H. Adams & Brian J. Adams	April 8, 2019
Gretta seems to be slowly adjusting to her new life, but all that is put in jeopardy when the witch Hexela arrives and begins hunting Gretta. Dwight and Baldric vow to do everything in their power to protect Gretta, but things are not always as they seem when it is revealed that Baldric and Hexela actually have a complicated past together. Introducing: Danielle Bisutti as Hexela. Guest stars: Trey Warner and Noah Lovato as unnamed cast members.
5	5	"Shackled"	Paul Hoen	LeeAnne H. Adams & Brian J. Adams	April 15, 2019
The Woodside Community Carnival begins as an effort to raise funds for the arts, but it takes a turn for worse when Dwight and Gretta are kidnapped and shackled together by Macklyn the Fox. Now the two must traverse the carnival and keep things operating smoothly while trying to find a way to break free of each other and keep Gretta's treasury safe from Macklyn and his group of merry men. Introducing: Andrew Pifko as Macklyn the Fox. Recurring character: Bonita Friedericy as Nana, Jazmine Shaw as Sophie. Guest stars: Maria Julian as Patty, Morgan Renee Thompson as Snow Cone Girl and Cayden Corbett as High School Student Committee Member.
6	6	"Lessons One Through Four"	Jeffrey Hunt	LeeAnne H. Adams & Brian J. Adams	April 22, 2019
Chlodwig decides to toughen Dwight by training him in the art of knights, but the lessons will be put to the test all too soon when Baldric is possessed by a fairy. Now the two must track and stop Baldric before he opens up a portal to the fairy realm and brings much chaos to their world. Recurring character: Bonita Friedericy as Nana. Guest stars: Brandon Ngo as Skinny Employee, Ali Kinkade as Grocery Store Stocker, Paul Sonnier as Jazmine (The Pretzel Guy) and Mark Brocksmith as Large Employee.
7	7	"Winnie the Wyvern"	Timothy J. Kendall	LeeAnne H. Adams & Brian J. Adams	April 29, 2019
Winnie the Wyvern arrives at Gretta's residence and asks for something, but only one person the group knows can help them understand her- Hexela. After visiting Hexela the group learns that Winnie is a wyvern (water dragon) that had her skin stolen by someone from the castle. She wants just one thing- her skin returned by the castle member that stole it so she can return to the water. Introducing: Catherine Lidstone as Winnie the Wyvern. Guest stars: Paul Kiernan as King Fergus the Lost/Dragon Skin thief, Michael Potter as Mr. Dale and Nate Sears as TV Bachelor .
8	8	"Dragon"	Jeffrey Hunt	LeeAnne H. Adams & Brian J. Adams	May 6, 2019
In order to learn more about her family history Gretta, Dwight and Baldric return to the former castle and locate the lost well which contains passage to the dragon holding her families secrets. Baldric also hopes that the dragon fire might be able to repair his scepter. What they find is none other than a dragon who is actually a shifter related to Gretta, but is there more to this appearance than the group expects? Recurring character: Andrew Pifko as Macklyn the Fox. Guest star: Robyn Lively as Lady Ermingarde (Auntie Ermie).
9	9	"Todd"	Paul Hoen	Valerie Hill Wahlert, LeeAnne H. Adams & Brian J. Adams	May 13, 2019
Hexela returns to test out a new potion on Gretta. What she does not tell Gretta is that it s a love potion and it will cause Gretta to fall in love with the first thing that she sees, regardless of whether it is human or not. Unfortunately for the local paper boy Todd, he is the first thing Gretta sees. Can Dwight and Baldric find some way to reverse these charms effects, or will this potion become a curse and a hindrance to them all? Recurring character: Bonita Friedericy as Nana. Guest stars: Cooper Johnson as Todd.
10	10	"Champion Do-Over Pt. 1"	Eyal Gordin	LeeAnne H. Adams & Brian J. Adams	May 20, 2019
Gretta is kidnapped by an ogre, so Dwight rushes and grabs Baldric to come up with a rescue plan. They are beaten to the punch though by a knight named Sir Aldred. As Aldred comes closer to Gretta the group begins to accept him, but what they do not know is that Aldred actually has a plan that would release Dwight from the champion's spell forever and allow him to take Dwight's place. Introducing: Kanoa Goo as Sir Aldred, Gary Kasper as Eberulf the Ogre. Recurring character: Bonita Friedericy as Nana.

=== Season 2 (2019) ===
No. overall	No. in season	Title	Directed by	Written by	Original release date
11	1	"Champion Do-Over Part II"	Eyal Gordin	LeeAnne H. Adams & Brian J. Adams	September 22, 2019
Hexela discovers that Sir Aldred is actually an evil magician from a cult known as the tovenars. Using his special form of magic, Sir Aldred acquired the fighting skills of Princess Gretta, Hexela, Chlodwig and Baldric. Now it is up to Dwight to try to stop him, but does Dwight stand any chance when he is not a fighting man? Recurring characters: Bonita Friedericy as Nana, Kanoa Goo as Sir Aldred.
12	2	"Unlucky in Love"	Frank Waldeck	David Drew Gallagher	September 29, 2019
An old crush (Emily) visits Dwight, but while helping Baldric search for his missing cell phone, also known as the Beckoning Device, Dwight accidentally curses himself. Now Baldric, Gretta and Hexela must help Dwight navigate through the day while completing steps to remove his curse, but can they do so when Dwight has an unofficial date scheduled to remain at his side the entire time? Recurring character: Bonita Friedericy as Nana. Guest starring: Joy Regullano as Emily, Chris Harvey as Tennis Ball Launcher Mechanic 1, Luiz Laffey as Tennis Ball Launcher Mechanic 2.
13	3	"All Hail the Woodchuck"	James Larkin	David Drew Gallagher	October 6, 2019
Woodside and Lakeview battle in the yearly basketball rivalry, starring none other than Dwight as the Woodchuck. When Dwight becomes sick Gretta must fill in. Will Gretta make a good mascot? Making things worse, basketball star Chad has stolen a horn from the Lakeview case that summons the dangerous Highlander to the site of the game. Recurring character: Jazmine Shaw as Sophie. Guest starring: Aidan Alexander as Chad, Ray Porter as Highlander, Spencer McConnell as Basketball Player.
14	4	"Alban Elfed Day"	James Larkin	LeeAnne H. Adams & Brian J. Adams	October 13, 2019
Dwight helps Gretta and company host Alban Elfed Day, an ancient version of Thanksgiving that is supposed to bring joy and posterity to the kingdom for the next year. However, every time the bell is rung the day begins to repeat itself because an infinity spell has been cast on the festivities. The team must figure out what they must do to break the infinity spell's hold. Introducing: Matthew Davis as Uncle Arnolf/Mummer.
15	5	"Switcheroo"	Jeffrey Hunt	LeeAnne H. Adams & Brian J. Adams	October 20, 2019
Dwight agrees to help the gang celebrate Choldwig's birthday but what everyone has forgotten is that Choldwig is under a curse. Each year on his birthday, Chlodwig switches bodies for 24 hours with the person he has most recently wronged. Dwight and Chlodwig must work out how to navigate the day as each other, but how many people will notice something is wrong? Recurring character: Bonita Friedericy as Nana. Guest starring: David Mattey as Dalibor the Destroyer, Stan Ellsworth as Bandit Leader, Maxine Summers as Senior Ladies Grandmother,
16	6	"Truthberry Cobbler"	James Larkin	LeeAnne H. Adams & Brian J. Adams	October 27, 2019
Dwight plans camping trip to allow the group to have some rest and relaxation, but a fire closes the route to the campground and forces the group to camp instead at Gretta's old castle. In an effort to try to keep some normalcy, Dwight makes the group some Dutch oven cobbler with blackberries, but in reality the berries are truth berries that force everyone to tell the truth. What they do not know is that they will run into Gretta's first crush and his father, a group of woodcutters searching for a magical tree that ends up being none other than Gretta's mother cursed. Introducing: Pearce Fazekas as Emelian, Jorge Rodriguez as Yoska. Recurring character: Bonita Friedericy as Nana.
17	7	"The Queen Tree"	Frank Waldeck	LeeAnne H. Adams & Brian J. Adams	November 3, 2019
A rogue woodcutter enters the woods and has his eyes on one site - the Queen. Now Gretta, Dwight, Emelian, Yoska and Choldwig must track down this rival woodcutter before the Queen falls forever. Things change when Chlodwig decides to focus on matchmaking instead of protecting the Queen. Recurring characters: Pearce Fazekas as Emelian, Jorge Rodriguez as Yoska. Guest starring: Travis Love as Stoyan.
18	8	"Invincible"	Sean Lambert	LeeAnne H. Adams & Brian J. Adams	November 10, 2019
The legendary thief Wenzo Thief breaks into Gretta's house searching for a mysterious artifact. He is armed with a quiet friar's robe, a robe immune to all weapons except the shears and needle it was made from. Dwight, Baldric and Gretta seek the council of the Quiet Friar's explains how Wenzo obtained one of their robes and then provides the group with the means to defeat him. However, the group is shaken to the core when they find out that someone hired Wenzo Thief to steal a tovenar relic from the castle, a relic that has the ability to bring back a second tovenar. Introducing: Nate Sears as Mr. Dale, Kyle More as Wenzo. Recurring character: Kanoa Goo as Sir Aldred. Guest stars: Eb Madson as Friar Ziggy, Stephen Drabicki as Friar Frodie.
19	9	"Agnet"	David Jackson	LeeAnne H. Adams & Brian J. Adams	November 17, 2019
A nightmare arrives for Chlodwig when his stalker Agnet arrives. Agnet is determined to become Chlodwig's wife and comes up with crazy schemes like trapping him in a pit of snakes and turning him into a frog that only she can reverse, but all that Chlodwig wants is to be left alone in peace. Unfortunately, Agnet thinks the way to win Chlodwig's heart is to make him rescue her from orc territory, so Chlodwig, Dwight and Gretta follow her and end up running into Jacopo. Will Jacopo give in to the temptation to rechallenge Gretta and Dwight, or will Jacopo think it is a challenge and decide to rescue Agnet instead? Introducing: McKaley Miller as Agnet. Recurring characters: Josh Breslow as Jacopo, Nate Sears as Mr. Dale, Kanoa Goo as Sir Aldred. Guest stars: Bryson Alejandro as Open Mic Host.
20	10	"Wishy Washy Pt. I"	Jeffrey Hunt	LeeAnne H. Adams & Brian J. Adams	November 24, 2019
Ragana, a member of Hexela's coven, arrives in Woodside with secret intentions. She is determined to find out what keeps Hexela in Woodside, but in the process Baldric accidentally breaks one of Hexela's wiles and rekindles a rivalry between the two. When Ragana discovers Baldric is in town she insists on collecting the witch's debt that he owes her - a year of servitude. In the process, she learns that Hexela has a wish turtle and she becomes determined to claim it as her own. Now Dwight and Gretta must find a way to defuse the situation and reclaim Baldric, but what will happen if she gets something even more powerful that could engulf all of Woodside? Introducing: Abbie Cobb as Ragana. Recurring characters: Kanoa Goo as Sir Aldred, Nate Sears as Mr. Dale.

=== Season 3 (2020) ===
No. overall	No. in season	Title	Directed by	Written by	Original release date
21	1	"Wishy Washy Part 2"	Jeffrey Hunt	LeeAnne H. Adams & Brian J. Adams	March 15, 2020
Ragana has swapped Baldric's year of servitude for Dwight and the wishing turtle. Ragana hopes to use Dwight's skills to gain as many wishes as she desires from the wishing turtle. When Dwight refuses, she uses her happy to oblige spell on Dwight to force him to give any wishes he gains to her. Gretta, Baldric, Hexela and Chlodwig pursue them and come up with a plan to rescue Dwight, but will their plan be successful when Ragana seems to have gained unlimited power? Introducing: Lauren Revard as Madgie, Nicky Buggs as Vika. Recurring characters: Abbie Cobb as Ragana, Kanoa Goo as Sir Aldred, Nate Sears as Mr. Dale. Guest star: Stephanie Astalos-Jones as Crone.
22	2	"Glimpse"	Jeffrey Hunt	LeeAnne H. Adams & Brian J. Adams	March 22, 2020
Hexela and Baldric go through Ragana's old belongings to see what Hexela has won. Amongst them is a ring known as The Glimpse which provides the wearer with a glimpse into an event in their future that will occur that day. Despite being advised against using it, Gretta steals The Glimpse to see what could happen. Now Chlodwig, Gretta and Dwight must head the Swine and Slosh Tavern to try and prevent that glimpse from occurring, but is there anything they can do when they do not know which events ultimately caused the glimpse into their future to occur, especially when they learn that Jacopo is working at the tavern and Agnet was eaten by giants? Introducing: Antonio Charity as Hellibad, Tim Sitarz as First Thug. Recurring characters: Josh Breslow as Jacopo, Kanoa Goo as Sir Aldred, Nate Sears as Mr. Dale; Guest stars: Esteban Cueto as Second Thug.
23	3	"Fancy Pants"	Eyal Gordin	David Drew Gallagher	March 29, 2020
Dwight decides to assist Baldric and Gretta with some spring cleaning. While doing so he finds a pair of jester pants which leap on Dwight and begin running around town. When Baldric and Gretta finally catch him they are able to get the pants off Dwight, but they leap upon Baldric and then begin running him all around town. As the pants continue to switch between the three of them, they decide to call upon Hexela for help. She quickly learns that the pants are in fact under the control of the maniacal court jester Ludicriosi. Can anyone stop the chaos of the pants? Recurring character: Bonita Friedericy as Nana. Guest stars: Morgan Ryan as Lemonade Girl, Leeanne H. Adams as Jogger #1, Brian J. Adams as Jogger #2.
24	4	"Mirabel"	James Larkin	Valerie Hill Wahlert, LeeAnne H. Adams & Brian J. Adams	April 5, 2020
Gretta's coming of age ball has failed several times in the past, so Baldric decides to turn the Woodside Sweethearts Ball into her coming of age ball. However, every time it is mentioned, there is a gust of wind. Some believe the wind to be an angry ghost, but if so why is it after Gretta? And if it is a ghost can Dwight and company keep it from ruining the ball for everyone else? Guest stars: Tori Kostic as Mirabel, Aidan Alexander as Chad.
25	5	"Just Desserts"	James Wahlberg	Laura Eichhorn	April 12, 2020
Baldric and Hexela prepare to go on a lunch reservation until Madgie kidnaps Hexela and tries to claim Baldric as her new lover for eternity. Meanwhile Dwight and Gretta are summoned to the Swine and Slosh Tavern to serve as jury duty members after a cow kicks someone in the head. Recurring character: Lauren Revard as Madgie. Guest stars: Michael A. Cook as Mann, Sean Hankinson as Herald, Rial Ellsworth as Lord Steward, Kelly Tippens as Neighbor's Wife, Dylan Kussman as Angus Pewlet, Andrew Hunter as Cow's Owner, Brian Troxell as Neighbor.
26	6	"Lake Monster"	Jeffrey Hunt	David Drew Gallagher	April 19, 2020
Dwight and Gretta join the Woodside newspaper where they learn that Winnie the Wyvern is surfacing at Woodside Lake. Winnie believes that dark times are about to return and is trying to give a warning. When the local sommunity begins heading to Woodside Lake to try to catch the wyvern, Dwight and company must find a way to communicate with Winnie before things can go crazy for everyone involved. Introducing: Christian Gabriel Anderson as Zeke, Chase Steven Anderson as Dronelover99. Recurring character: Catherine Lidstone as Winnie the Wyvern. Guest stars: Lauren Boyd as Dronelover98, Yani Simone as First Fan Girl, Haley Goldman as Second Fan Girl, Maya Santandrea as Third Fan Girl, Eleanor Caudill as Wedding Planner, Henry Adams as McCollis, Jude Adams as McCollis.
27	7	"A Bone to Pick"	Eyal Gordin	LeeAnne H. Adams & Brian J. Adams	April 26, 2020
Zeke brings Gretta and Dwight with him to investigate a new story - mysterious holes are being dug around Woodside. At one site, Dwight finds a pendant that leads him and Gretta to Mr. Dale's insurance agency. When they arrive they learn that Mr. Dale has been digging holes each night and more than 200 have been dig. However, he has no recollection of digging them or of learning what they are finding at these locations. Elsewhere, Baldric and Hexela try to use an attraction spell to find Sir Aldred and learn just how many bones the tovenar has collected. Introducing: Marc Farley as Barkeep, Dusty Mitchell as Waiter. Recurring characters: Christian Gabriel Anderson as Zeke, Kanoa Goo as Sir Aldred, Nate Sears as Mr. Dale, Josh Breslow as Jacopo, Tim Sitarz as First Thug.
28	8	"Sporg"	Jeffrey Hunt	LeeAnne H. Adams & Brian J. Adams	May 10, 2020
The tovenar possessing Mr. Dale tricks Dwight and Gretta into giving up the location of the last tovenar bone. Sir Aldred goes to Hexela's shop and retrieves the final bone, after which he returns to the Sloth and Swine Tavern to resurrect the tovenar. Jacopo helps Dwight and Gretta escape before deciding to flee. Mr. Dale follows suit, hiring an Uber taxi to take him to the airport so he can escape to Madagascar. After freeing Hexela and Baldric from Sir Aldred's magnet spell, Hexela realizes an ancient creature might know how to make a tovenar dead. The group calls on Winnie and asks her how they can kill the tovenars permanently. Winnie reveals Dwight is the only one who can do the task and he will need to contact Uncle Arnolf for further assistance. Meanwhile, Sporg reveals that the bones of the tovenars are scattered all across the Earth, but the original protector took one bone from each and hid them all together, meaning if they can find that vault they can recover all of their brothers' bones quickly. Introducing: Brandon Nesmith as Sporg. Recurring characters: Kanoa Goo as Sir Aldred, Nate Sears as Mr. Dale, Josh Breslow as Jacopo, Catherine Lidstone as Winnie the Wyvern.
29	9	"Uncle Arnolf"	Jeffrey Hunt	LeeAnne H. Adams & Brian J. Adams	May 17, 2020
Chlodwig arrives to host Guy's Club shortly after Gretta and company have requested Uncle Arnolf's assistance. Slowly but surely, each member of Guy's Club arrives, but when Uncle Arnolf arrives he sends them on a quest throughout the cosmos. Uncle Arnolf reveals the presence of the tovenars' relics, called the reliquary. The group wonders how Sporg's bone was removed from the reliquary, so Uncle Arnolf takes them to Wenzo Thief so he can tell them the tale. Wenzo reveals that his uncle found the reliquary in a hidden tomb in Gretta's castle. Sadly, the birds have led Sporg and Sir Aldred to that location. They recover the bones and are ready to take over the world. Uncle Arnolf reveals that he can send the group to Spain and to the immortal flame, but first they must obtain permission from Fate the Owl, the same owl that led Dwight to Gretta's castle in the first place. Gretta and Dwight obtain permission, but the birds inform Sporg, causing both groups to head to the immortal flame's location with everything at stake. Recurring characters: Kanoa Goo as Sir Aldred, Brandon Nesmith as Sporg, Chase Steven Anderson as Dronelover 99, Matthew Patrick Davis as Uncle Arnolf, Kyle More as Wenzo, Tim Sitarz as First Thug, Marc Farley as Barkeep.
30	10	"Dead Dead"	Frank Waldeck	LeeAnne H. Adams & Brian J. Adams	May 24, 2020
After opening the portal, Uncle Arnolf leaves, but not before telling the group that they need to save the four final donuts for a rainy day and telling them that the portal can only remain open for 23 minutes and 23 seconds. Dwight, Gretta and Chlodwig enter the portal and try to put out the flame, but all their efforts only anger the flame. The tovenars arrive and begin to battle, forcing Hexala to use the candle that she won from Ragana to freeze time. Eventually, the group notice wizard script written around the flame. It gives very specific instructions - only Dwight can put out the flame with distilled water from the Himalayan Mountains. Luckily, that is the very water that Nana has had Dwight drinking. Dwight retrieves a bottle and uses it to put out the flame, thus destroying all the tovenars. That evening, Gretta officially knights Dwight and makes him Sir Dwight for all time. Dwight asks if anything can be worse, but the others refuse to answer him. Recurring characters: Christian Gabriel Anderson as Zeke, Kanoa Goo as Sir Aldred, Brandon Nesmith as Sporg, Matthew Patrick Davis as Uncle Arnolf, Dusty Mitchell as Waiter.

=== Season 4 (2020) ===
No. overall	No. in season	Title	Directed by	Written by	Original release date
31	1	"Another Slice of Pilot"	Brad Tanenbaum	LeeAnne H. Adams & Brian J. Adams	September 20, 2020
As the group waits in the queue at Phoebe's pie cart, Chlodwig retells the events of the first episode from his point of view. He tells how the curse affected him and how he woke up and went in search for Gretta. But does he have an ulterior motive for bringing them there, and, if so, what is his purpose? Introducing: Chris Mayers as Edenberry Elf; Recurring characters: Josh Breslow as Jacopo, Drew Scheid as Charles; Guest stars: Jessica Craig as Juliet, Kiah Alexandra Clingman as Phoebe, Sarah Borne as Friend, Gary Peebles as Troll 1, Esteban Cueto as Troll 2, Casey Hendershot as Troll 3
32	2	"Guy Club"	Eyal Gordin	LeeAnne H. Adams & Brian J. Adams	September 27, 2020
Gretta and Baldric are summoned to a parent-teacher conference to discuss Gretta's attitude to history lessons. After they leave, a future Chlodwig arrives with a dire warning for present Chlodwig. The missing Guys Club members unexpectedly return with a talking gas that could destroy all carbon-based life on Earth—unless Dwight and present Chlodwig can find a way to send it home. Introducing: Brian S. Lewis as Mr. Hammond; Recurring character: Chase Steven Anderson as Dronelover 99; Guest stars: Alpha Trivette as Old Chlodwig, Josh Breslow as Phil
33	3	"The Severians"	Eyal Gordin	LeeAnne H. Adams & Brian J. Adams	October 4, 2020
The Severians arrive for their 10-year audience with Gretta to plead for their freedom and the return of their Chief Stick, but Gretta refuses to listen. After one of the Severians sneaks back to steal the Chief Stick, Dwight and company pursue her into the woods. Introducing: Marley Aliah as Militsa; Recurring character: Brad Brinkley as Samo, Gary Kasper as Eberulf the Ogre
34	4	"Kirk the Berserker"	Frank Waldeck	LeeAnne H. Adams & Brian J. Adams	October 11, 2020
It is time for the annual Woodside Seniors versus Lakeview dodgeball grudge match. Before the match Baldric hands Dwight a whistle. It turns out the whistle summons the ghost of Kirk the Berserker, but he can only be seen by whoever blows it. Introducing: Gregory Kelly as Kirk; Recurring character: Bonita Friedericy as Nana; Guest stars: Richard Garner as Wayne, Lauren Boyd as Monica, Nikolas Dimondi as Dodgeball Ref
35	5	"Smooch"	Jeffrey Hunt	LeeAnne H. Adams & Brian J. Adams	October 18, 2020
During the filming of a new YouTube commercial for Hexela's salon, a spell gone awry turns Hexela, Gretta and Nana into goats. Baldric and the group seek out the Contrarian, who provides a set of instructions which must be completed within 4 hours or the goatification will become permanent. The group must find straw and negotiate with a Troll to cross his bridge. The final step requires a romantic kiss, and Dwight must finally admit his feelings for Gretta. Introducing: Eric Mendenhall as Contrarian; Recurring characters: Gregory Kelly as Kirk, Bonita Friedericy as Nana, Antonio Charity as Hellibad; Guest stars: Charles Green as Troll, Caleb J. Spivak as Boyfriend, Aria Castillo as Girlfriend, Casey Nelson as Guy in Scrubs
36	6	"The Draugar"	Jeffrey Hunt	LeeAnne H. Adams & Brian J. Adams	October 25, 2020
On All Hallows Eve, an army of the living dead and a vampire seeking revenge on Gretta's bloodline converge on the school after the Fire Marshall puts out the torches lit to protect it. But all is not as it seems. As Gretta and Baldric are about to realize, the zombies are actually trying to protect them. Recurring character: Brian S. Lewis as Mr. Hammond, Christian Gabriel Anderson as Zeke; Guest stars: Eddie Davenport as Vaselli, Jason Macdonald as Gandalf, Hayes Mercure as Lincoln, Adam Rosenberg as Hotdog, Haley Goldman as Costumed Zombie, Muretta Moss as Mom, Jeffery Hunt as Fire Marshall, Phil Fornah as Draugar Captain, George Quinones as Draugar Soldier #1, Robert Bennet as Draugar Soldier #2, Ronnie Shalvis as Draugar Soldier #3, Rabon Hutcherson as Draugar Soldier #4
37	7	"Hansel & Gretta"	James Wahlberg	LeeAnne H. Adams & Brian J. Adams	November 1, 2020
Hexela's YouTube commercial is a huge success, forcing Hexela to hire Baldric as her assistant. Gretta feels ignored and consoles herself with food from a new chef, Hansel, who holds a mysterious control over her. When Gretta begins to bloat, Dwight discovers the chef is using magical ingredients. Recurring characters: Antonio Charity as Hellibad; Guest stars: Michael Hyland Cole as Hansel
38	8	"The Grim Reaper"	James Larkin	David Drew Gallagher	November 8, 2020
Dwight accidentally summons the Grim Reaper ("Grimbo" to his friends), who must take a soul back with him at sunset, Dwight being the obvious choice. He can avoid going with the reaper by beating him in a challenge, but Grimbo proves too good at everything. Meanwhile, Baldric's brother comes for a visit and plays on Baldric's insecurities. Recurring characters: Gregory Kelly as Kirk, Bonita Friedericy as Nana, Marc Farley as Barkeep; Introducing: Chris Gann as Brodogg; Guest stars: A. Smith Harrison as Grimbo
39	9	"Biffels"	James Larkin	LeeAnne H. Adams & Brian J. Adams	November 15, 2020
Dwight and Gretta prepare their oral history presentations. Gretta and Baldric prepare a traditional food called Biffels to round off Gretta's presentation. Dwight's well-meant plan to speed up the cooking backfires. When Macklyn the Fox appears, on a quest to regain his memories, the group seeks out the Contrarian. The Contrarian reveals that not only Macklyn's memories, but Gretta's and Baldric's too, have been stolen. Recurring characters: Andrew Pifko as Macklyn the Fox, Eric Mendenhall as Contrarian, Brian S. Lewis as Mr. Hammond; Guest stars: Rick Andosa as Mage
40	10	"Four Weddings and a Health Code Violation"	Brad Tanenbaum	LeeAnne H. Adams & Brian J. Adams	November 22, 2020
Agnet returns, having somehow survived the beasts of the wilderness. Her one desire is Jacopo's hand in marriage. Gretta and Dwight are named bridesmaid and groomsman and charged with arranging the music and venue—for the next day. Jacopo confides to Dwight that he doesn't really want to marry Agnet, but his sense of chivalry won't allow him to break her heart. The wedding commences with Baldric officiating. When Baldric calls for objections, Dwight does so, and is horrified to learn that, in the realm, whoever objects to a wedding must take the groom's place. Recurring characters: Josh Breslow as Jacopo, McKaley Miller as Agnet, Chris Mayers as Edenberry Elf, Marc Farley as Barkeep

=== Season 5 (2021) ===
No. overall	No. in season	Title	Directed by	Written by	Original release date
41	1	"Forks Up"	Brad Tanenbaum	LeeAnne H. Adams & Brian J. Adams	March 21, 2021
New innkeeper Jacopo brings in Nick Reeves from the Woodside Food Network in an effort to promote the Swine and Slosh Tavern. If he can't get new patronage then his investors, including the senior ladies of Woodside, could be thrust into bankruptcy. Among the entertainments and delights Nick endures are the tavernside brawl dinner show, a singing Hexela promoting her age-reducing potion, Chlodwig pursuing a feud with the IRS for making Hellibad quit the tavern, a woodchuck-shaped pot pie and the old-town barber-dentist Anson Swift. Recurring characters: Josh Breslow as Jacopo, Marc Farley as Barkeep, Gary Kasper as Eberulf the Ogre; Guest stars: David de Vries as Nick Reeves, Matan Friedman and Ori Friedman as Toddler Nick Reeves, Lynn Wonless as Mrs. Brinkelhurst, Debra Nelson as Mrs. Tenney, Marjorie Ocho Kouro as Mrs. Walton, Sean Baker as Anson Swift
42	2	"The Clapper"	James Wahlberg	LeeAnne H. Adams & Brian J. Adams	March 28, 2021
When the spoilt Elf Princess Pridwyn comes to visit, her aide Agravain places Dwight under a spell to make him her champion, and it's up to Gretta to come up with a plan to free him. Meanwhile, by royal command, Gretta sends Baldric on a quest to obtain a wacky wavy tube man. Recurring characters: Josh Breslow as Jacopo, Marc Farley as Barkeep, Gary Kasper as Eberulf the Ogre; Guest stars: Marcia Harvey as Pridwyn, Justin Miles as Agravain, Kara Cantrell as Shop Owner, Holly Britt as The Piper
43	3	"What's Amiss?"	Bengt Jönsson	LeeAnne H. Adams & Brian J. Adams	April 4, 2021
While on a quest to find a rare magic herb that's only available for 6 hours, Baldric and Hexela come across the stone soldiers that caused Baldric to cast the champion's spell. They learn that a witch from Hexela's coven died when another witch cast the liven spell that brought the soldiers to life. Meanwhile, Gretta opens a chest from the wizards guild that casts the house afloat at sea with her still inside, and neither Dwight nor Baldric can understand her frantic calls and texts. Recurring character: Brian S. Lewis as Mr. Hammond, Josh Breslow as Jacopo, Nicky Buggs as Vika; Introducing: Aisha Duran as Daryna
44	4	"Brodogg"	Brad Tanenbaum	LeeAnne H. Adams & Brian J. Adams	April 11, 2021
Brodogg returns, claiming he wants to learn to become a court magician. But when Gretta spies him stealing pages from Baldric's spell books, the crew captures him to learn his true purpose. On interrogation, Brodogg admits he's a fraud and that he's spying for someone wearing the House of Moondragon's signet ring—the very ring once worn by Gretta's father. Baldric accompanies Brodogg to learn why the stranger wants to build a scrying pool. When the brothers return with no memory of the meeting, Dwight and Gretta realize that the stranger is the Memory Thief. Recurring characters: Chris Gann as Brodogg, Bonita Friedericy as Nana
45	5	"Who is The Memory Thief Part 1"	Brad Tanenbaum	LeeAnne H. Adams & Brian J. Adams	April 18, 2021
The annual Teachers Appreciation Luncheon arrives. Dwight has arranged for Brodogg to perform magic tricks, but when the Speed Demon returns and carries Baldric away, Dwight and Gretta go in pursuit. They next appear dressed as football players, with no memory of what has happened. They find Jacopo, dressed as Woody the Woodchuck, and Brodogg, both of whose memories are unaffected. The memory thief's identity is revealed. Recurring characters: Josh Breslow as Jacopo, Chris Gann as Brodogg, Christian Gabriel Anderson as Zeke, Brian S. Lewis as Mr. Hammond; Introducing: Larry Bagby as Principal Shoemaker; Guest star: Dayna Bielenson as Female Teacher, Jacques Buckingham as Male Teacher, Ashley N. Green as Student
46	6	"Who is The Memory Thief Part 2"	Brad Tanenbaum	LeeAnne H. Adams & Brian J. Adams	April 25, 2021
A flashback reveals how Mr. Hammond became the history teacher. We revisit his time at Woodside from his point of view and learn that each time he met with Baldric and Gretta, he entered Baldric's memory, trying to steal the knowledge of how to create a scrying pool—something only Baldric has achieved. Dwight and company send Jacopo to Gretta's house so that he at least won't have his memory stolen. There, Jacopo finds a book showing they have confronted Mr. Hammond more than 50 times. In the latest confrontation, Mr. Hammond successfully unlocks Baldric's memory and reveals he needs a scrying pool in order to kill Gretta. When the group returns without their memories, Jacopo helps them realize they need a new approach. Gretta remembers the Contrarian said he could help them once they know who the memory thief is. Meanwhile, Mr. Hammond tells the speed demon "It's time." Recurring characters: Larry Bagby as Principal Shoemaker, Brian S. Lewis as Mr. Hammond, Josh Breslow as Jacopo, Chris Gann as Brodogg, Christian Gabriel Anderson as Zeke; Introducing: Troy Warner as The Voice of the Speed Demon, Aniston Campbell as Little Gretta
47	7	"Flashback"	Alec Smight	LeeAnne H. Adams & Brian J. Adams	May 2, 2021
The Contrarian tells how everyone can get their memories back. As the group seeks out forget-me-not flowers, they are met by Macklyn and Hexela. Hexela reveals the witch who killed Hexela's coven-mate is none other than Ragana, who is also Hammond's lover. The group heads to Eastwood High, where, with the aid of Hexela's magnet spell, they face down Hammond and Ragana and regain their memories. The memories include: the truth of a scrying pool, how the queen was turned into an invincible tree, Hammond's relationship to Gretta, how the king was turned over to the fairies and how Baldric used forbidden magic to save Gretta. When Hammond and Ragana escape, Macklyn promises to gather all the forces he can to protect Gretta from her greatest peril ever. Recurring characters: Eric Mendenhall as Contrarian, Andrew Pifko as Macklyn the Fox, Abbie Cobb as Ragana, Brian S. Lewis as Mr. Hammond, Troy Warner as The Voice of the Speed Demon, Aniston Campbell as Little Gretta; Introducing: Lesa Wilson as The Queen
48	8	"The Scrying Pool"	Alec Smight	LeeAnne H. Adams & Brian J. Adams	May 9, 2021
The group returns to Gretta's home, where Chlodwig joins them. They set up a watch so Hammond can't ambush them. During the second watch, Baldric realizes they plan to build a scrying pool. The group rushes to Hammond's dungeon in the high school basement, but Hammond has already completed the pool. Hammond tries to steal the group's memories to stop them following, but the effect of the forget-me-nots thwarts him. With no other choice, Hammond and Ragana jump into the pool and travel to the past. Dwight tries to lead the group back into the past, but Baldric stops him, reminding him he can't go back to a past when he wasn't alive. He also says there is no return for those who do enter the pool. When Dwight realizes he may forget everyone, he uses the forget-me-nots to keep his memories of them forever. One by one, Baldric, Hexela, Chlodwig and finally Gretta enter the pool. Just as Gretta enters, Dwight begins to say "Gretta, I...," but she vanishes and the end credits roll. Recurring characters: Abbie Cobb as Ragana, Brian S. Lewis as Mr. Hammond, Josh Breslow as Jacopo (flashback); Guest star: Alpha Trivette as Old Chlodwig (flashback)
49	9	"The Finale Part 1"	Brad Tanenbaum	LeeAnne H. Adams & Brian J. Adams	May 16, 2021
Dwight struggles with Gretta and the others gone as if they had never existed. He visits the Queen Tree, who in a dream tells him to "bring her back." When his class visits the Woodside hieroglyphs, Dwight sees Gretta's bat signal. He rushes to the castle ruins, digs until he falls in, and once more kisses Gretta to awaken her. They embrace and kiss until Baldric arrives to inform them he is off to save Hexela. In flashback, we see Gretta arriving in the past, weeping because she'll never see Dwight again, and being consoled by Baldric. Baldric visits the Queen Tree, who instructs him to "find the champion," who will know what to do. Back in the present, Dwight is clueless of what to do but a phone alert reminds him to fetch fake blood for a play and they rush to the school. Meanwhile, Hammond and Ragana are awake and furious at being caught in the Champion's Spell. Hexela stands where they tied her up before the spell. Dismissing the idea of traveling back in time only to be thwarted yet again by the spell, Hammond decides to rebuild Rogomore in the present, using an army of stone soldiers that Ragana says will be ready at sundown. First, though, he must find Gretta. Recurring characters: Christian Gabriel Anderson as Zeke, Bonita Friedericy as Nana, Lesa Wilson as The Queen, Gary Kasper as Eberulf the Ogre, Brian S. Lewis as Mr. Hammond, Abbie Cobb as Ragana, Drew Scheid as Charles, Marley Aliah as Militsa (flashback); Guest stars: Laimarie Serrano as Ms. Hernandez, Marcia Harvey as Pridwyn (flashback), Justin Miles as Agravain (flashback)
50	10	"The Finale Part 2"	Brad Tanenbaum	LeeAnne H. Adams & Brian J. Adams	May 23, 2021
Dwight and Gretta arrive at Woodside, where Dwight reintroduces Gretta to the drama club. Hammond soon arrives and begins a sword fight with Gretta. Dwight and Gretta escape and Dwight realizes that when the Queen said "bring her back," she meant him to bring Gretta to the Queen Tree. Meanwhile, Baldric arrives to free Hexela, but she warns him of the witches trap: she reveals that she saved Yedza but was caught herself. Before Baldric can figure out how to free her, Ragana returns and begins a magic fight. Meanwhile, Dwight and Gretta arrive at the Queen Tree. The Queen and Gretta talk before Hammond arrives. Hammond starts a sword fight, but Dwight tricks him into striking the Tree with his sword: Hammond is vaporized by the invincible tree. With the fight over, Chlodwig arrives with the help he has gathered—Macklyn, in fox form, and Lady Ermingarde, in the form of a dragon. Meanwhile, Baldric uses a mirror to reflect one of Ragana's spells back at her and she is trapped. He uses Ragana's dagger to free Hexela and proposes to her. She happily accepts, and then summons the Witches Tribunal. With Yedza's testimony, Ragana is found guilty: she is turned into an old hag and stripped of her ability to use magic. The group then returns to Woodside and repurchases the house. They defeat the trolls that try to invade, and, when Jacopo returns and tries to put a spell on Gretta with his music, it dawns on them that almost every adventure they've been on will be repeated. Recurring characters: Brian S. Lewis as Mr. Hammond, Abbie Cobb as Ragana, Drew Scheid as Charles, Jessica Craig as Juliet, Lesa Wilson as The Queen, Nicky Buggs as Vika, Aisha Duran as Daryna, Josh Breslow as Jacopo; Guest stars: Candi Vandizandi as Yedza, Sarah Borne as Student, Tim Sitarz as Troll #1, Casey Hendershot as Troll #2, Rabone Hutcherson as Troll #3

== Production ==
Seasons 1 and 2 were filmed in Utah. Season 2 was approved before season one aired. Season 3 was moved to Georgia to take advantage of state-offered tax breaks. The episodes are 30 minutes each. As of March 2019, it is one of the most expensive series ever made by BYUtv.

== Reception ==
'The New York Times' reported that reaction of a focus group was positive. Parade recommended it as a great option for family viewing. Review have been positive overall.

== Release ==
In the United States, the show appears on BYUtv. International release by Paramount Television Stream free on BYUtv, The CW, or PLEX. Stream with a subscription on Amazon Prime Video.
