= Ester Geislerová =

Czech actress and model (born 1984)

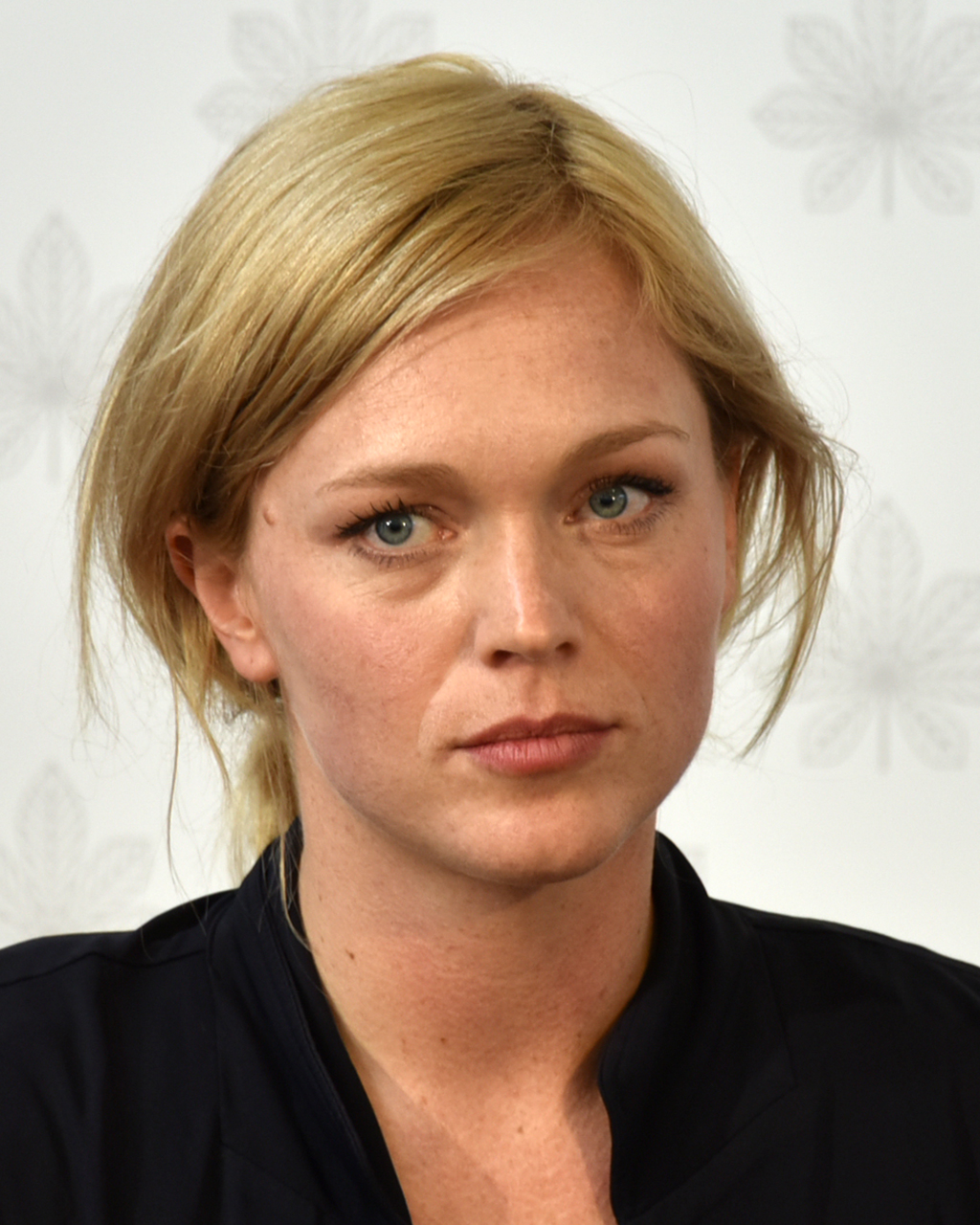
- Ester Geislerová in 2019
- Born: 5 March 1984 (age 42); Prague, Czechoslovakia
- Occupation: Actress
- Years active: 1996–present

Ester Geislerová (born 5 March 1984) is a Czech actress and former model.

== Biography ==
Geislerová was born in Prague. She studied at the Academy of Fine Arts. Her first film was F. A. Brabec's 1996 film King Ubu. She is the youngest of three sisters, including actress Anna Geislerová. Geislerová won the national Elite Model Look in 2002. Although she has acted on film and television, she has not acted on stage. In June 2005, aged 21, she gave birth to twins, daughter Mia Rosa and son Jan Étienne. She married the babies' father, Jan Kadlec, in April 2005.

== Selected filmography ==
- King Ubu (1996)
- Most (2003)
- Snowboarďáci (2004)
- Up and Down (2004)
- The House (2011)
- Dogs Don't Wear Pants (2019)
- LOVEhunt (2019)
