= Kirk B. R. Woller =

American actor (born 1962)

Kirk B. R. Woller (born March 9, 1962) is an American actor who has appeared as Gaius in The Chosen, Agent Gene Crane on The X-Files, and the boss of the mysterious cleaners in Charmed. His notable film characters include coach Cal Sawyer in Hometown Legend, Chief Officer Reynolds in Poseidon, detective Frank Shaw in Urban Justice, hotel-clerk Jordan in Hollywoo, and the cab driver in The Ride where he was nominated for Best Male Performance.

His other guest star appearances include Melrose Place, Nash Bridges, NYPD Blue, ER, CSI, JAG, CSI: Miami, Alias, NCIS, Criminal Minds, 24, The Unit, Bones, Without a Trace, Boston Legal, Ghost Whisperer, Prison Break, Big Love, Criminal Minds: Suspect Behavior, Extant, and Switched at Birth.

Other film roles include Swordfish, Minority Report, Hulk, After the Sunset, The Ring Two, Flightplan, Big Momma's House 2, Flags of Our Fathers, Resident Evil: Extinction, and Woodlawn.

== Filmography ==
=== Film ===
Year	Title	Role
1990	Daredreamer	Steve/Stephan
1996	The Reality of Doing	Tank
1997	Interruptions	Ernie, the handyman
1998	Mercury Rising	Lieutenant
1998	Sand Trap	Carl
2001	Firetrap	FBI Agent Foster
2001	Swordfish	Lawyer
2001	Killer Me	Martin
2002	Hometown Legend	Cal Sawyer
2002	Minority Report	Pre-Crime Cop
2002	Global Effect	Conrad Lee
2003	Klepto	Jeffries
2003	Hulk	Comanche Pilot
2003	Cliché	Jack Lichec
2004	Face of Terror	Thomas Billings
2004	Sweet Underground	Skinhead Brother
2004	Boa vs. Python	Agent Sharpe
2004	After the Sunset	Security Guard
2005	The Ring Two	Detective
2005	The L.A. Riot Spectacular	SWAT Leader
2005	Flightplan	Grunick
2005	Midnight Clear	Gas Station owner
2006	Big Momma's House 2	Doug Hudson
2006	Poseidon	Chief Officer Reynolds
2006	Flags of Our Fathers	Bill Genaust
2006	Midnight Clear	Kirk
2007	Resident Evil: Extinction	Scientist
2007	Urban Justice	Det. Frank Shaw
2008	The Lucky Ones	Army Psychologist
2008	Curse	Phil
2008	Cleansed	Brett
2008	The Least of These	Detective Crowe
2009	Like Dandelion Dust	Bill Norton
2009	Guided	Daley
2010	Unthinkable	Observer
2011	Hollywoo	Jordan le réceptionniste
2012	The Ride	Driver
2015	Woodlawn	Owen Davis
2016	The Resurrection of Gavin Stone	Jack Roth
2024	The Best Christmas Pageant Ever	Reverend Hopkins

=== Television ===
Year	Title	Role
1993	Angel Falls	Bus Driver
1993	The Adventures of Brisco County, Jr.	Villain No. 2
1993	Melrose Place	Delivery Man
1996	Crime of the Century	Carl Henkel
1996	Nash Bridges	Mike Hart
1996	The Sentinel	Soles
1996–1997	NYPD Blue	Mitch
1997	Dark Skies	Pavel Antonovich
1997	Night Man	German Leader
1997	Brooklyn South	Russian Fence
1998	Silk Stalkings	Zack
1998	The Day Lincoln Was Shot	George A. Atzerodt
1998	C-16: FBI	Alonso Degriff
1999	L.A. Heat	Larry Puzzo
1999	Sliders	Private Bates
2000	18 Wheels of Justice	Duane
2001	ER	
2000–2001	The X-Files	Agent Gene Crane
2001	CSI: Crime Scene Investigation	Prison Warden
2002	JAG	NCIS Special Agent Gillette
2002	Alias	Rat Exterminator
2002	Path to War	Officer
2003	CSI: Miami	Detective Christian Brunner
2003	The Law and Mr. Lee	Ron Fenner
2003	10-8: Officers on Duty	Sergeant Virgil Jinks
2002–2004	Strong Medicine	FBI Special Agent Randolph P. Lentz
2004	NCIS	Lieutenant Commander Wayne Julius
2003–2004	Charmed	Cleaner One
2004	Helter Skelter	Detective Kleinman
2005	Huff	Niall Nordstrom
2005	McBride: Tune in for Murder	Fallon
2005	Over There	Dr. Muecke
2005	Criminal Minds	Franklin Graney
2005	E-Ring	CIA Deputy Inspector General Mitchell Sykes
2005	Locusts: The 8th Plague	Agent Greg Ballard
2006	S.S. Doomtrooper	SS Lieutenant Reinhardt
2006	24	Hans Meyer
2006	The Unit	Detective Penman
2006	Bones	Peter Leferts
2006	Windfall	Eddie
2006	Dead & Deader	Major Bascom
2006	The Mikes	Sergeant McHenry
2007	Claire	Marty Kendall
2007	Without a Trace	Jim Sweeney
2008	Boston Legal	FBI Special Agent John Sharpe
2008	Ghost Whisperer	Dr. Farrington
2008	My Own Worst Enemy	David
2008	Prison Break	Richard Sooter
2009	Lie to Me	Mike Personick
2009	Eleventh Hour	Frank Fuller
2009	Saving Grace	Del Garber
2010	The Whole Truth	Porter Radell
2011	Big Love	Fred Zurick
2011	Love's Everlasting Courage	Bruce
2011	Criminal Minds: Suspect Behavior	Dr. Vincent Florio
2011	The Event	Lieutenant Grier
2011	Harry's Law	Detective Schuller
2012	Rizzoli & Isles	Jeff Miller
2013	Touch	Private Detective
2013	Vegas	Jenkins
2014	Extant	Sheriff
2014	Switched at Birth	Chris Washburn
2019–present	The Chosen	Gaius
