= Sea of Hope (film) =

2025 Czech romantic comedy-drama film

- Directed by: Martin Horský
- Written by: Martin Horský
- Produced by: Tomáš Hoffman
- Starring: Ondřej Vetchý; Jiří Langmajer; Linda Rybová
- Cinematography: Jan Drnek
- Edited by: Ondřej Hokr
- Distributed by: Bontonfilm
- Release date: 6 March 2025 (Czech Republic)
- Running time: 102 minutes
- Country: Czech Republic
- Language: Czech
- Box office: 29 Million CZK

Sea of Hope (Czech: Moře na dvoře) is a 2025 Czech romantic comedy-drama film.

== Cast ==
- Ondřej Vetchý as violinist Josef Šťastný
- Jiří Langmajer as blind chess player Václav
- Linda Rybová as dressmaker Anežka
- Sara Sandeva as violinist Bára Dvorská
- Tadeáš Moravec as released prisoner Kryštof
- Matěj Kadlec as little boy Matěj
