= 2018 CMT Music Awards =

Annual US country music awards ceremony

- Date: June 6, 2018
- Location: Bridgestone Arena, Nashville, Tennessee
- Hosted by: Little Big Town

Highlights
- Most wins: Blake Shelton (2)
- Most nominations: Various Artists (3 each)

Television/radio coverage
- Network: CMT

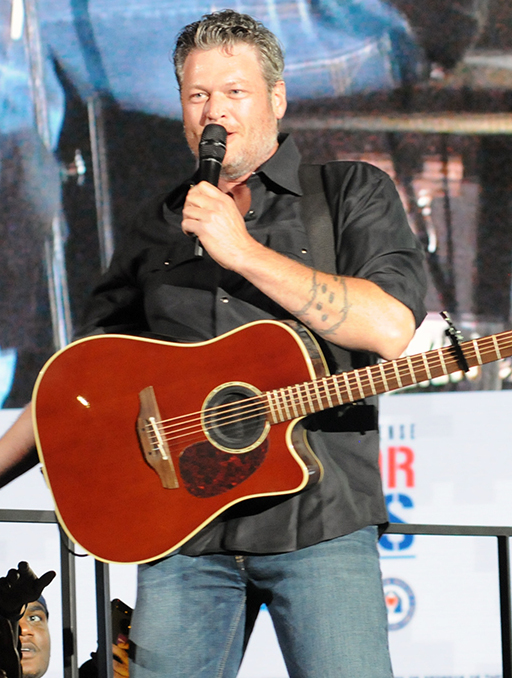
Most awarded artist of the ceremony, Blake Shelton, including a win for Video of the Year.

The 2018 CMT Music Awards were held at Bridgestone Arena in Nashville, Tennessee on June 6, 2018. Little Big Town was the host for the show. The CMT Music Awards are a fan-voted awards show for country music videos and television performances; Voting takes place on CMT's website.

== Winners and nominees ==
Nominees were announced on May 8, 2018. Winners are shown in bold.

Video of the Year	Female Video of the Year
**Blake Shelton — “I’ll Name The Dogs”**; Brett Young — “Mercy”; Kane Brown feat. Lauren Alaina — “What Ifs”; Luke Combs — “When It Rains It Pours”; Thomas Rhett — “Marry Me”	**Carrie Underwood feat. Ludacris — “The Champion”**; Carly Pearce — “Every Little Thing”; Kelsea Ballerini — “Legends”; Lauren Alaina — “Doin’ Fine”; Maren Morris — “I Could Use A Love Song”; Miranda Lambert — “Tin Man” (From 2017 ACM Awards)
Male Video of the Year	Group Video of the Year
**Blake Shelton — “I’ll Name The Dogs”**; Dustin Lynch — “Small Town Boy”; Jason Aldean — “You Make It Easy”; Jon Pardi — “Heartache On The Dance Floor”; Luke Bryan — “Light It Up”; Thomas Rhett — “Marry Me”	**Little Big Town — “When Someone Stops Loving You”**; Lady Antebellum — “You Look Good”; LANco — “Greatest Love Story”; Midland — “Make A Little”; Old Dominion — “No Such Thing As A Broken Heart”; Rascal Flatts — “Yours If You Want It”; Zac Brown Band — “My Old Man”
Duo Video of the Year	Breakthrough Video of the Year
**Dan + Shay — “Tequila”**; Big & Rich — “California”; Brothers Osborne — “It Ain’t My Fault”; Florida Georgia Line — “Smooth”; High Valley — “She’s With Me”; Tim McGraw & Faith Hill — “Speak To A Girl”	**Carly Pearce** — **“Every Little Thing”**; Danielle Bradbery — “Sway”; Devin Dawson — “All On Me”; Lanco — “Greatest Love Story”; Russell Dickerson — “Yours”; Walker Hayes — “You Broke Up With Me”
Collaborative Video of the Year	CMT Performance of the Year
**Kane Brown feat. Lauren Alaina** — **“What Ifs”**; Bebe Rexha feat. Florida Georgia Line — “Meant To Be”; Carrie Underwood feat. Ludacris — “The Champion”; Cole Swindell feat. Dierks Bentley — “Flatliner”; Justin Timberlake feat. Chris Stapleton — “Say Something”; Thomas Rhett feat. Maren Morris — “Craving You”	**From CMT Crossroads: Backstreet Boys and Florida Georgia Line** — **“Everybody”**; From 2017 CMT Artists of the Year: Andra Day, Common, Little Big Town, Lee Ann Womack and Danielle Bradbery — “Stand Up For Something”; From 2017 CMT Music Awards: Charles Kelley, Jason Aldean, Darius Rucker and Derek Trucks — “Midnight Rider”; From CMT Crossroads: Earth, Wind & Fire and Lady Antebellum — “September”; From 2017 CMT Artists of the Year: Jason Aldean, Keith Urban, Chris Stapleton and Little Big Town — “I Won't Back Down”; From 2017 CMT Music Awards: Keith Urban feat. Carrie Underwood — “The Fighter”
