= Pythons 2 =

- DVD cover
- Written by: Dan Smith
- Directed by: Lee Alan McConnell
- Starring: William Zabka; Simmone Jade Mackinnon; Dana Ashbrook; Alex Jolig
- Music by: Rich McHugh
- Country of origin: United States
- Original languages: English, Russian, Chechen

Production
- Producers: Jeffery Beach; Phillip J. Roth
- Cinematography: Azusa Ohno
- Editor: Ayton Davis
- Running time: 89 minutes
- Production company: UFO/Unified Film Organization

Original release
- Network: Sci Fi Channel
- Release: August 17, 2002

Pythons 2 (also known as Pythons, released on home media as Python II or Pythons II and sometimes listed in references as Python 2), is a science-fiction horror film released as a Sci Fi Pictures television film on Syfy. A 2002 sequel to the 2000 film Python, it stars Billy Zabka, reprising his role as Greg Larson from the first film, in addition to Dana Ashbrook and Simmone Jade Mackinnon. Directed by Lee McConnell, it was produced by Jeffery Beach and Phillip Roth.

== Plot ==
In Russia, US Army Colonel Robert Evans Jefferson Jr. has been tasked to lead Russian soldiers commanded by Sergeant Ivan Petrov on a secret mission to capture an 80-foot python that was created by American scientists and has gotten loose near the Ural Mountains. Colonel Jefferson and Sergeant Petrov, accomplish their assigned task (although one of Petrov's men is killed by the snake.) and the snakes are placed aboard an American cargo plane heading for the United States, Chechen rebels mistake the plane for a Russian one and they shoot it down, This alerts a Russian Army unit nearby, who then attack the rebels and subsequently take the mysterious container back to a nearby base. However, the creature escapes, and slaughters all the soldiers and scientists. The only survivor is the commander of the Russian military base, Colonel Zubov.

American Dwight Stoddard and his Russian wife Nalia run a shipping business in Russia. Greg Larson hires them to move a mysterious container, which is holding another larger python, and they reach the isolated and deserted Russian military base where they discover Zubov. After Dwight and Nalia learn that Larson's true intentions are to leave no witnesses, Larson engages Dwight in a fist fight and loses. As he attempts to surrender, a python slithers onto the scene behind him. Larson is momentarily confused. The snake growls and darts towards him. He whirls around and screams as the python coils around him. He tries to escape but creature has him tightly constricted in its coils. Dwight and Nalia look on with satisfaction. Dwight instructs his wife to leave them. The python briefly loosens its coils around Larson, who manages to scream out one more plea for Dwight to save him. Before Dwight can move, the python devours Larson whole. The snake is killed when a brick of C4 is hurled into its mouth by Dwight, while the other snake chases Dwight and Nalia outside where it is destroyed by a bombing run issued by Larson's superiors. Dwight and Nalia survive and are rescued by Russian soldiers.

== Cast ==
- William Zabka as Greg Larson
- Dana Ashbrook as Dwight Stoddard
- Alex Jolig as Matthew Coe
- Simmone Jade Mackinnon as Nalia Stoddard
- Marcus Aurelius as Colonel Robert Evans Jefferson Jr.
- Mihail Miltchev as Hewitt
- Vladimir Kolev as Crawley
- Kiril Efremov as Boyer
- Raicho Vasilev as Dirc
- Vadko Dimitrov as McKuen
- Anthony Nichols as Kerupkot
- Velizar Binev as Aziz
- Tyron Pinkham as Pilot
- Sgt. Robert Sands as Co-Pilot
- Maxim Genchev as Old Chechen
- Hristo Shopov as Doctor
- Ivaylo Geraskov as Colonel Zubov
- Ivan Barnev as Russian Soldier #1
- Georgi Ivanov as Russian soldier #2
- Ivan Panev as Scientist #1
- Stanislav Dimitrov as Scientist #2
- Robert Zachar as Father
- Bojka Velkova as Mother
- Kiril Hristov as Spence

== Production ==
Pythons 2 was filmed in Sofia, Bulgaria. The visual effects supervisor was Alvaro Villagomez, the character animation supervisor was Yancy Calzada and the digital effects supervisor was Florentino Calzada.

== Reception ==
The DVD & Video Guide 2005 describes the movie as beginning "on a boring note and goes downhill from there". Doug Pratt states that William Zabka's performance appears as if "he had sat through too many Emillio Estevez films" and called the cinematography of the DVD transfer "grainy". The VideoHound's Golden Movie Retriever 2005 gave the film its lowest rating on a five-point scale.

== See also ==
- List of killer snake films
