= The Wicked (2013 film) =

- Theatrical release poster
- Directed by: Peter Winther
- Written by: Michael Vickerman
- Produced by: Zachary Halley; Marvin Towns Jr. Michael Vickerman; Couni Young; Robert Young
- Starring: Devon Werkheiser; Justin Deeley; Jess Adams; Jamie Kaler; Caitlin Carmichael
- Cinematography: Eduardo Enrique Mayén
- Edited by: Brady Hammes
- Music by: Joseph LoDuca; S. Peace Nistades
- Release dates: March 20, 2013 (Denmark); April 30, 2013 (United States)
- Running time: 105 minutes
- Country: United States
- Language: English
- Budget: $1.2 million

The Wicked is a 2013 American horror film directed by Peter Winther and starring Devon Werkheiser, Justin Deeley, Jess Adams, Jamie Kaler and Caitlin Carmichael.

== Plot ==
There is a local myth of a witch whose spirit is said to inhabit an abandoned house known as Open Hearth. It is said the Witch eats children to live; girls to stay beautiful and young men for strength. Though the myth is initially regarded as superstition, it is proven to be real when a little girl named Amanda is snatched from her bedroom without a trace.

Max is a teenager mourning his Grandpa's death and is visited by his tomboy friend Sammy. Sammy is the neighborhood delinquent, her mother is a drunkard, no one knows who her father is, and local police despise her. Max and his brother Zach fight over everything. The next night Max's father has to work and asks Zach to babysit Max. But Max learns that Zach, along with his friends Julie, Carter, and Tracy are planning to go to Open Hearth and throw a rock through one of the windows to see if the myth is true. Max and Sammy decide to follow them and take pictures so he can have his revenge. They take a short cut through the woods on their bikes, where they kiss for the first time.

In the meantime, Zach and his friends arrive at Open Hearth and throw stones at the house. One of the stones hits the window, and they are not sure whose stone it was. They see a shadow moving inside the house and run back to the camping area. There, they get drunk and have sex with their partners. Max and Sammy find the house and throw stones at it. Max's rock hits the window, and they run after seeing the witch. Later that night Julie hears a whisper and finds a teddy bear which belongs to Amanda outside the camp. The four decide to check out the woods to find the kidnapped girl. They come near the abandoned house of the witch and hear a child crying from inside.

Julie decides to go in despite the warning from her friends. Zach joins her in the search, and they find Amanda tied up in the basement with an apple in her mouth. They manage to escape into the woods with the witch in pursuit. Once at the campsite they are shocked to find Carter's truck missing and their tent and other camping gear are gone. With the town 10 miles away and the nearest ranger station four miles away, they decide to walk rather than wait for the witch to catch them. Max shoots a video asking whoever finds the footage to burn the house down as the myth is real. The witch then abducts Max while Sammy screams. Zach and his friends lose their way and wander in circles due to the witch's magic. Zach finds Max's bike and decides to go into the house again to rescue his brother. The others go into the woods in search of the nearest rangers station. The witch kidnaps Carter and his girlfriend Tracy while Julie and Amanda hide under the bush.

Zach finds Max in the basement and is knocked out by the witch. Sammy reaches the nearby rangers station and calls the cops, who reject her call as a prank. She finally blackmails Deputy Karl, saying she will upload the photo which shows him smoking on duty if he doesn't show up. Enraged, Karl sets out to arrest Sammy. Back in the house Zach opens his eyes and sees Max, Carter and Tracy pinned to the walls with apples in each of their mouths. The witch kills Carter and Tracy with a huge meat grinder and eats them both, thereby restoring her beauty. Zach manages to free his hands from the cuffs and tries to escape with Max. They manage to make it out of the house, but the witch captures them again. In the meantime Karl arrests Sammy and takes her back to the police station, rejecting her pleas to save Max. He gets a message from another cop, Deputy Mahoney, saying the ranger in Speeder Station is dead, and he found Julie and Amanda. Karl realizes Sammy is telling the truth and drives towards Open Hearth, asking Mahoney to meet him there.

Karl arrives and goes inside, with Deputy Mahoney remaining to guard Sammy. The witch kills Mahoney and attacks Karl inside the house. Sammy finds Max, and as she tries to escape with him, they find Zach on the table and save him. They find a bottle designed to capture the witch and decide to use it. The witch runs away at first but then attacks them and start to drain their souls. They manage to burn her using the flamethrower given to Max by his grandfather, who is revealed to have been a witch hunter. When the police search the house later, they do not find any corpses. The house is later torn down and turned into a children's park, and the film ends with the suggestion the witch is still hunting children.

== Cast ==
- Caitlin Carmichael as Amanda Drake
- Justin Deeley as Zach Reese
- Devon Werkheiser as Max Reese
- Diana Hopper as Sammy
- Nicole Forester as Terri Drake
- Jamie Kaler as Deputy Karl
- Chase Maser as Carter Evans
- Cassie Keller as The Witch
- Jackelyn Gauci as Tracy
- Jess Adams as Julie Rand
- Celeste Risko as Rachel Reese
- Carlos Faison as Sargent Reid
- Greg Collins as Dr. James Reese
- Robert Young as Deputy Mahoney
- Paula Tutman as News Reporter

== Reception ==
DVD Verdict gave the film a positive review. On review aggregator website Rotten Tomatoes, the film has an approval rating of 17% based on 213 reviews, with a rating average of 2.1/5.
