= Phillip J. Roth =

American director, screenwriter (born 1959)

- Born: 10 June 1959 (age 66); Portland, Oregon, USA
- Occupations: Film producer, director and screenwriter
- Years active: 1982–present
- Spouse(s): Leslie Crawford (m. 1989; div. 1995) Lizzy Weintraub (m. 1995; div. 2002) Ralitsa Roth (m. 2003; div. 2008) Ekaterina Jeliazkova (m. 2009)
- Children: 4

Phillip J. Roth (born June 10, 1959) is an American film producer, director and screenwriter who is known for making low-budget films. He is the founder of the Unified Film Organization (UFO) in America and Bulgaria, which have released various action and science fiction films for television and home video markets. He is often (55 of 124 productions, as of 2025) credited as Phillip Roth.

== Early life and career ==
Roth was born in Portland, Oregon, to Phillip J. Roth, a Senior circuit judge from Multnomah County, Oregon, and Ida Lorraine Roth Knudson. He attended high school in Portland, Oregon with musician Jim Goodwin, who has written the original music for several Roth films, including Digital Man and Velocity Trap.

He expressed an interest in cinema from an early age, upon seeing his first film that he wanted to "tell pictures with light" and he later achieved his dream. His first film, Bad Trip, was made for television, which led to other hi-concept sci-fi films like A.P.E.X. and Total Reality.

In 1995, Roth formed the Bulgarian United Film Organization (BUFO) in Sofia, Bulgaria with Ken Olandt. BUFO is a production services company for U.S companies including Universal Pictures. He formed the American Unified Film Organization in 1997 with Jeff Beach in Burbank, California. He recognized the growing demand in science fiction and special effects driven action films.

In 2000, Roth moved from Los Angeles to Sofia, Bulgaria to shoot the film Mindstorm. Since then his companies UFO and BUFO have produced many films. Roth has also opened a new four stage film and television center in Bulgaria.

== Personal life ==
Roth met Leslie Crawford and they dated each other for 2 years from 1987 - 1989, they married in June 1989, soon afterwards they had a daughter called Natasha Mozelle Roth, after a 5 year relationship they divorced in March 1995.

He then met Lizzy Weintraub and they dated each other in 1994, they then married each other in May 1995, they had a son in 1998 called Aaron Henry Roth, after an 8 year relationship they divorced in January 2002.

In 2002, he met Ralitsa Roth and married her a year later, after a 5 year relationship they divorced in January 2008.

Roth met Ekaterina Jeliazkova in 2002. Their first daughter Elayah Roth was born in October 2006. They married on September 1, 2009. Their second daughter, Roxanne Roth was born in October 2011.

One of Roth's hobbies is skiing. He has taken part in races in the FIS Eastern European National Circuit, and he also won a prize at a corporate celebrity charity ski event in Bansko.

== Filmography ==
=== As producer ===
Year	Title	Notes
1982	Breach of Contract	also screenwriter
1988	Bad Trip	also director, screenwriter
1990	Fatal Revenge	also director, screenwriter
1991	Prime Target	also director
1991	Red Snow	also director
1992	Prototype	also director, screenwriter
1993	Rule No. 3	
1994	A.P.E.X.	also director, screenwriter
1995	Digital Man	also director, screenwriter
1997	Total Reality	also director, screenwriter
1997	Darkdrive	also director, screenwriter
1999	Storm	also screenwriter
1999	Velocity Trap	also director, screenwriter
1999	Interceptor Force	also director, screenwriter
2000	Python	
2000	Escape Under Pressure	also screenwriter
2000	Daybreak	also screenwriter
2000	Deep Core	also screenwriter
2001	Epoch	also screenwriter (TV movie)
2001	Falcon Down	also director, screenwriter
2001	New Alcatraz	also director, screenwriter
2001	Mindstorm	also director, screenwriter
2001	Shark Hunter	also screenwriter
2001	Lost Voyage	
2002	Pythons 2	
2002	Interceptor Force 2	also director, screenwriter
2002	Antibody	
2002	Descent into Darkness	also screenwriter
2002	Landspeed	
2002	Hyper Sonic	also director and, as Paul Joshua Rubins, screenwriter
2002	Dark Descent	co-producer
2003	Maximum Velocity	also director
2003	Rapid Exchange	
2003	Deep Shock	also director, screenwriter (TV movie)
2003	Dragon Fighter	also director, screenwriter (direct-to-video)
2003	Epoch: Evolution	
2003	Silent Warnings	
2003	Dark Waters	also director, screenwriter
2004	Phantom Force	
2004	Darklight	
2004	Dragon Storm	
2004	Post Impact	
2004	Boa vs. Python	
2005	Locusts: The 8th Plague	
2005	Path of Destruction	
2005	Manticore	
2006	Basilisk: The Serpent King	
2006	Dragon Dynasty	
2006	S.S. Doomtrooper	
2006	Magma: Volcanic Disaster	
2007	Reign of the Gargoyles	
2007	Bats: Human Harvest	
2007	Lake Placid 2	
2007	Grendel	
2008	Ghost Voyage	
2008	Rock Monster	
2008	Copperhead	
2008	Monster Ark	
2008	Boogeyman 3	
2009	Messengers 2: The Scarecrow	co-producer
2009	Lightning Strikes	also screenwriter
2009	Annihilation Earth	
2009	Star Runners	
2009	Thor: Hammer of the Gods	
2009	The Grudge 3	
2009	Wrong Turn 3: Left for Dead	
2010	Triassic Attack	
2010	Dark Relic	
2010	Arctic Predator	
2010	Lake Placid 3	
2011	Cold Fusion	
2011	Red Faction: Origins	also screenwriter
2011	Super Tanker	
2011	Super Eruption	
2011	Time Machine: Rise of the Morlocks	
2011	Rage of the Yeti	
2012	Black Forest	
2012	True Bloodthirst	
2012	Boogeyman	
2012	Lake Placid: The Final Chapter	
2012	Hijacked	
2012	Wrong Turn 5: Bloodlines	
2013	Jet Stream	also screenwriter
2013	Robocroc	also screenwriter
2013	Invasion Roswell	
2013	Company of Heroes	
2013	Deadly Descent: The Abominable Snowman	
2013	Supercollider	also screenwriter
2013	Taken: The Search for Sophie Parker	
2014	Crystal Skulls	
2014	Firequake	also screenwriter
2014	Wrong Turn 6: Last Resort	
2015	Lake Placid vs. Anaconda	
2015	Viking Quest	
2015	Roboshark	also screenwriter
2015	The Throwaways	
2016	Jarhead 3: The Siege	
2016	Beyond Valkyrie: Dawn of the 4th Reich	
2017	Valentine's Again	
2017	Crystal Inferno	also screenwriter
2018	Death Race: Beyond Anarchy	co-producer
2019	Nicole & O.J.	services producer - Bulgaria currently filming
2019	Doom: Annihilation	

=== As director ===
Year	Title	Notes
1991	Prime Target	Director & Screenwriter (Video)

== Accolades ==
Association	Year	Category	Nominated work	Result
Fantasporto	1994	International Fantasy Film Award	A.P.E.X.	Nominated
