= Deep Core (film) =

- Directed by: Rodney McDonald
- Written by: Phillip J. Roth; Jim Christopher
- Produced by: Jeffery Beach; Melanie J. Elin; James Hollensteiner; Thomas J. Niedermeyer Jr.; Ken Olandt; Phillip J. Roth; Richard Smith
- Starring: Craig Sheffer; Terry Farrell; Bruce McGill; Harry Van Gorkum; Wil Wheaton; James Russo; Kenneth Choi; Donald Li
- Cinematography: Richard Clabaugh
- Edited by: Randy Carter
- Music by: Richard McHugh
- Production company: Unified Film Organization (UFO)
- Distributed by: Alliance Atlantis Communications; Bridge Entertainment Group; Cine Plus Home Entertainment; New City Releasing; Paramount Home Entertainment; Paramount Pictures; PlayArte Filmes; Prime Wave
- Release date: June 26, 2001 (U.S.)
- Running time: 86 minutes
- Country: United States
- Language: English

Deep Core is a 2000 American action science fiction film. The film was generally poorly received.

== Synopsis ==
Brian, the head drilling engineer of an unnamed company, sabotages the drilling operation as he is concerned that Alan the CEO is drilling too deep without taking necessary precautions.

Alan restarts the drilling operation on an island off the coast of China and while drilling using a mole-like machine, the drilling team hits a magma flow which kills them. This then causes a large volcanic eruption and earthquake.

Alan and Brian start investigating the effects of the drilling, with help from Allison Saunders, head of research and development at the company. They realize that they have affected the stability of the Earth's core, which is going to cause natural disasters all over the world. They figure that the only way to stop the magma flow and earthquakes is to use a series of nuclear explosions to reset the spinning of the Earth's core. They plan to drop these bombs using a new drilling machine.

The earthquakes start to spread all over the world, affecting major cities. Quito, Ecuador is hit and many important buildings are destroyed.

Darryl obtains the nuclear bombs from the Chinese government. However, they want their own team to do the drilling. Brian disagrees and assembles his own team including Allison and his drilling engineer colleagues Brian and Rodney. Alan also volunteers to be part of the team.

They prepare to drill down into the earth to position the nuclear bombs at strategic positions ready for a coordinated sequence of explosions. They start drilling down into the ground, and successfully drop the first 2 nuclear bombs. They have an issue with the cabin pressure, but after running diagnostics, they realize that the sensors malfunctioned and they manage to reset them.

A large piece of rock breaks one of the connections to the feet, which needs to be repaired. Allison and Rodney go outside to fix it. Meanwhile, Brian realizes that they have been drilling into a magma flow. The magma comes through the roof of the tunnel, killing Rodney. Brian goes outside and rescues Allison. They continue drilling to escape the Magma flow and drop the third nuclear bomb.

There is another large volcanic eruption from Mount Pinatubo in the Philippines, as the destabilization of the Earth's core gets worse.

Alan confesses that he has partnered with the Chinese government, that they had a lot of input into the design of the drilling vehicle, and that the vehicle will go to the government after the drilling mission so they can use it as a weapon. Darryl is contacted by Colonel Po, a Chinese government official who threatens him to ensure the government get control of the vehicle after the mission has been completed.

Meanwhile, the drilling team hits a cave full of diamonds, which they can't drill through so they must go around it. The drilling team successfully drops the fourth nuclear bomb, but due to their detour around the diamond cave, they run out of communication cable they have been laying to stay in contact with the command center. This initiates a self-destruct countdown of the bomb pod within the drilling vehicle.

They eject the bomb pod from the main mining vehicle, but Alan stays in the pod and delays the self-destruct by tying up the computer with a diagnostics program. Brian and his team find a magma flow, to get them to the surface away from the nuclear bombs before they detonate. The nuclear bombs all explode successfully. Brian and his team make it to the surface of the sea. They are rescued by the Coast Guard.

Darryl tries to cover up the fact that the drilling vehicle has survived and not fallen into the hands of the Chinese, by destroying all the evidence of the drilling vehicle. He then tries to escape in his car, but Colonel Po finds him and kills him.

== Cast ==
- Craig Sheffer as Brian Goodman, head Geologist and engineer
- Terry Farrell as Allison Saunders, head of Research and Development
- Bruce McGill as Sam Dalton, a drilling engineer
- Harry Van Gorkum as Alan Morrisey, CEO of the drilling company
- Wil Wheaton as Rodney Bedecker, a drilling engineer
- James Russo as Darryl Simmons, liaison with the Chinese government
- Kenneth Choi as Wayne Lung, head of the Chinese control centre
- Donald Li as Colonel Sun Po, a Chinese government official

== Reception ==
IMDb gave the film a 2.6 out of 10, AllMovie gave the film a 1.5 out of 5, Contact Music gave the film a 1 out of 5, TV Guide gave the film a 2 out of 5, and Disaster Movie World gave the film a 1 out of 5.

== See also ==
- The Core, 2003 film with a similar plot
