= Amy Bailey =

Amy Bailey may refer to:

- Amy Bailey (educator) (1895–1990), Jamaican educator, social worker and women's rights advocate
- Amy Bailey (actress) (born 1975), American actress
