= Donald Li =

Chinese actor (born 1961)

- Born: 1961 (age 64–65); Hong Kong, China
- Occupation: Actor
- Years active: 1983–present

Donald Li (born 1961) is a Chinese actor. He is best known for Big Trouble in Little China and The Avengers. He played multiple parts in Alan Cook's stage adaptation of John Steinbeck's novel East of Eden.

== Filmography ==
=== Film ===
Year	Title	Role	Notes
1983	Cook & Peary: The Race to the Pole	Etuk	Television film
1986	Big Trouble in Little China	Eddie Lee	
1986	One Crazy Summer	Chrong Freen	
1992	Memoirs of an Invisible Man	Cab Driver	
1992	Rapid Fire	Tall Guard	
1992	Saved by the Bell: Hawaiian Style	Keanu	Television film
1998	U.S. Marshals	Detective Kim	
2000	Deep Core	Colonel Sun Po	
2001	Falcon Down	Captain Chow	
2001	Epoch	Chinese Scientist	Television film
2005	Goal! The Dream Begins	Chinese Restaurant Manager	
2010	The Quickening	Max	Television film
2012	The Avengers	World Security Council	

=== Television ===
Year	Title	Role	Notes
1985	The Equalizer	Joe Boy	Episode: "China Rain"
1989	Gideon Oliver		Episode: "Tongs"
1992	Bodies of Evidence	Charlie Yung	Episode: "Nightmoves"
1992	Knots Landing	Bailiff	Episode: "Rescue Me"
1994	Masters of the Sea	John Cheng, CEO Cheng Pacific Lines	Episode:
1997	Nash Bridges	Elliot Lim	Episode: "The Web"
2001	The Practice	Juror	Episode: "Gideon's Crossover" (uncredited)
2009	Numbers	Waiter #1	Episode: "Trouble in Chinatown"
2009	The Bold and the Beautiful	Minister	Episode: "#1.5575" (uncredited)
2009–2010	Better Off Ted	Office Worker / Asian Man	Episodes: "Win Some, Dose Some" (uncredited), "Swag the Dog"
2010	Southland	Coroner	Episode: "The Runner"
2010	Romantically Challenged	Owner	Episode: "Rebecca's One Night Stand"
2012	Kickin' It	Doctor Chen	Episode: "Kickin' It in China"
2014	Days of Our Lives	Mr. Shinn	Episodes: "#1.12374", "#1.12375"
2015	Shameless	Maitre D'	Episode: "A Night to Remem-- Wait, What?"
2015–2016	Bosch	Charlie Lui	Episodes: "Victim of the Night", "Chapter Six: Donkey's Years"
2016	Idiotsitter	Mr. Sasaki	Episodes: "Viva La Joy", "Funeral"
2017	Hand of God	Reporter #2	Episode: "You Can't Go Back"
