= W.A.K.O. World Championships 1985 =

W.A.K.O. World Championships 1985 may refer to:

- W.A.K.O. World Championships 1985 (Budapest)
- W.A.K.O. World Championships 1985 (London)
