= Escape Under Pressure =

- Movie Poster
- Directed by: Jean Pellerin
- Written by: Jim Christopher (Screenplay); Phillip J. Roth (Story)
- Produced by: Jeffery Beach; Ken Olandt; Phillip J. Roth
- Starring: Rob Lowe; Larisa Miller; Craig Wasson; Harry Van Gorkum; Scott Anthony Viscomi
- Cinematography: Richard Clabaugh
- Edited by: Christian McIntire
- Music by: Richard McHugh
- Production company: Unified Film Organization
- Distributed by: HBO (USA) (TV); New City Releasing; Pressure Productions
- Release date: February 25, 2000; (South Africa)
- Running time: 87 min.
- Country: United States
- Language: English

Escape Under Pressure (also known as Under Pressure and The Cruel Deep) is a 2000 American disaster action film starring Rob Lowe. It was directed by Jean Pellerin.

== Plot ==
An extremely rare artifact on a Greek island sets off a ferocious battle on the deck of a sinking ferryboat.

== Cast ==
- Rob Lowe as John Spencer
- Larisa Miller as Chloe Spencer
- Craig Wasson as Elgin Bates
- Harry Van Gorkum as Crowley
- Tommy Hinkley as Carl
- Scott Anthony Viscomi as Nikos Gavras

== Reception ==
Escape Under Pressure received very poor reviews from critics. Nate Yapp from Cinema Blend criticized every aspect of the film, from the script to the actor's performances, passing through "the worst CGI ever". Yapp concludes, stating: "Whatever happened to TV-movie pride (I know I'm digging deep here, folks). The medium used to be a way for up and coming directors to get some exposure (a la Steven Spielberg and John Carpenter). Now it seems to be an excuse to keep actors like Lowe and Corbin Bernsen in the public eye, if only for two hours". In the review aggregator site Rotten Tomatoes the movie holds a 0% rating.
