= Ely Pouget =

American actress

- Born: Elizabeth Pouget; August 30, 1961 (age 65)
- Occupation: Film/television actress
- Years active: 1985–present

Elizabeth "Ely" Pouget (/ɛli ˈpuːʒeɪ/, born August 30, 1961) is an American actress and former model.

After studying film at the University of Miami, Pouget's first role came in 1985 when she played Rosella Maestres on the television series Miami Vice. In 1987, she played Gina in the series The A-Team. Her first film was The Wrong Guys (1988). She played Leslie Reins on TV in Friday the 13th: The Series and starred in the made for television movie L.A. Takedown, directed by Michael Mann. She played Sarah Downs in Young Riders and Maggie Evans in Dark Shadows.

== Filmography ==
=== Film ===
Year	Film	Role	Notes
1988	The Wrong Guys	Nicole	second character
1988	Tequila Sunrise	Barbara	second character
1989	L.A. Takedown	Lillian Hanna	second character
1990	Cool Blue	Christiane	principal
1990	The Rift	Ana Rivera	principal
1991	Curly Sue	Dinah Tompkins	second character*
1992	Silent Victim	Lauren McKinley	principal
1994	Tall, Dark and Deadly	Toni Compton	principal
1994	Death Machine	Hayden Cale	principal
1995	Red Shoe Diaries 5: Weekend Pass	Jane Chandler	principal
1996	Lawnmower Man 2: Beyond Cyberspace	Cori Platt	principal
1997	Total Reality	Cathy Easton	principal
2008	Faded Memories	Maggie May	principal
2015	The 3Tails Movie: A Mermaid Adventure	Jackie's Mom	second character

- Although credited, Pouget doesn't actually appear in the film, suggesting her scene was deleted before release.

=== Television ===
Year	Series	Role	Notes
1985	Miami Vice	Rosella Maestres	1 Episode
1985	No Mercy	Julia Fischer	second character
1987	The A-Team	Gina	1 Episode
1988	Friday the 13th: The Series	Leslie Reins	second character
1989	Shannon's Deal	Gwen	principal
1989	The Young Riders	Sarah Downs	second character
1991	Dark Shadows	Maggie Evans	principal
1990	Father Dowling Mysteries	Jillian McGuire	2 episodes
1990	L.A. Law	Elizabeth	guest appearance
1991	Civil Wars	Unknown Role	guest appearance
1992	Red Shoe Diaries	Jane Chandler	principal
1992	Reasonable Doubts	Unknown Role	guest appearance
1994	Walker, Texas Ranger	Rhonda Guthrie	principal
1994–1995	The Adventures of Brisco County, Jr.	Jennifer Hart	principal
1995	Murder, She Wrote	Vicki Lawson	second character
1998	Silk Stalkings	Mrs. Kersey	guest appearance
1998	Legacy	Unknown Role	guest appearance
1999–2000	Nash Bridges	Annie Lindsay	second character
2002	Outpatient	Francis Monk	principal
1994–2003	ER	Mrs. Banks	16 Episodes
2004	Charmed	Harriet Casey	6 Episodes
2004–2005	NCIS	Julie Watson	second character
2008–2010	The Young and the Restless	Dr. Braun	principal
2011–2012	The Mentalist	Teri Maier	2 episodes
2018	General Hospital	Jeannette Marino	3 episodes
