= Death Machine =

1994 film by Stephen Norrington

- Theatrical release poster
- Directed by: Stephen Norrington
- Written by: Stephen Norrington
- Produced by: Dominic Anciano
- Starring: Brad Dourif; Ely Pouget; William Hootkins; John Sharian; Martin McDougall
- Cinematography: John de Borman
- Edited by: Paul Endacott
- Music by: Crispin Merrell
- Production company: Fugitive Features
- Distributed by: Entertainment Film Distributors
- Release date: 4 February 1994 (United Kingdom)
- Running time: 120 minutes
- Countries: United Kingdom; Japan
- Budget: $3 million

Death Machine is a 1994 science fiction horror film written and directed by Stephen Norrington. It stars Brad Dourif, Ely Pouget, William Hootkins, John Sharian, and Richard Brake. Rachel Weisz, still early in her career at the time of the film's release, appears briefly in the role of a junior executive. Death Machine was the directorial debut of Norrington, who had previously worked as a special effects artist on films such as Lifeforce, Aliens, Hardware, The Witches, and Split Second. Several re-edits have been released.

== Plot ==
In 2003, the megacorporation Chaank Armaments is the world's leading manufacturer of cutting-edge weapons and military hardware. A cybernetically-enhanced supersoldier, codenamed "Hard Man", malfunctions and massacres the patrons of a diner before being detained by security operatives led by John Carpenter. Public outcry ensues following the incident, the majority of complaints directed at the company's new chief executive Hayden Cale.

Chairman of the Board Scott Ridley, fearful of the potential termination of Chaank's contracts due to the bad publicity, tries to cover up the incident and numerous issues with Project: Hard Man itself. Cale demands full public disclosure, having purposely leaked top-secret documents to the press in defiance of Ridley's attempts to suppress knowledge about his shadier activities. She also demands for Jack Dante, a weapon designer and lead developer of Project: Hard Man, to be fired. Despite Carpenter's acknowledgement of the project's fatal flaws, the board ignores Cale's requests, no one seeming to care about her interests except for Dante himself. Cale is warned by a junior executive about Dante's deranged behavior and the fate of Nicholson, her late predecessor. Cale goes to confront him, demanding to know about Dante's secret project in Vault 10, for which he never submits progress reports. Far from cooperative, Dante threatens Cale, blackmailing her with detailed knowledge of Cale's living situation, place of residence, and personal information. Cale asks Ridley for help, but he refuses, saying that Nicholson took a similar interest in Dante's work. However, he was killed in a mysterious accident believed to have been an animal mauling. During their confrontation, Cale lifts Ridley's access card so she can investigate on her own. Dante learns that Cale has the card and confronts Ridley, subsequently killing him with a mysterious weapon.

Meanwhile, three eco-warriors (Raimi, Weyland, and Yutani) infiltrate the Chaank headquarters to destroy its digitally-stored assets and send the company into bankruptcy. Carpenter calls Cale after finding Ridley's corpse which had an implanted life-sign transmitter. She investigates Ridley's death and discovers that whatever killed him came from Vault 10. Taking matters into her own hands, she terminates Dante's employment and seals the vault. Dante is about to shoot her when the eco-warriors show up and take everyone hostage. They demand access to the building's secure area to destroy the company's digital bonds, but Cale refuses to cooperate. Raimi goes to their alternate plan to cut through the bulkhead leading to the containment area. Dante, sensing his chance, "helps" them by suggesting they cut through one of the vaults surrounding the containment instead, suggesting they start at Vault 10.

Once the vault is open, Dante jumps in and activates his invention called the Frontline Morale Destroyer (a.k.a. "Warbeast"), which kills Weyland. Raimi flees, meeting up with Yutani as well as the subdued Cale and Carpenter. Dante broadcasts his demands over the monitor system, demanding that his employment be reinstated and Cale to "interface with him on a regular basis".

Raimi and Yutani cancel their operation to escape the building, along with Cale and Carpenter, the latter getting killed by the Warbeast inside a lift. From there, Raimi, Yutani and Cale reach the building's top floor, which holds classified items, whose existence even Cale is unaware of. Among the classified items are the primary components of Project: Hard Man, including advanced weaponry and armour. Cale and Yutani suit Raimi up and download the Hard Man data into his brain. Fighting off the Warbeast, he slows it down enough to allow an escape via an outdoor service elevator. Yutani, however, is killed by the Warbeast after hitting his head and falling in front of it. Making it back to the surface, Raimi and Cale have an encounter with an officer who is killed by the Warbeast as it leaps down from the rooftop, before chasing Cale and Raimi back into the building. Raimi manages to partially incapacitate the Warbeast, but the explosion knocks him unconscious, and the machine takes Cale back to Dante. During their conversation, Raimi regains consciousness and subdues Dante. The two escape, and Hayden traps Dante inside of Vault 10 with his own Warbeast. Behind Vault 10's reinforced door, Dante starts being hunted by his creation.

== Cast ==
- Brad Dourif as Jack Dante
- Ely Pouget as Hayden Cale
- William Hootkins as John Carpenter
- John Sharian as Raimi
- Martin McDougall as Yutani
- Andreas Wisniewski as Weyland
- Richard Brake as Scott Ridley
- Rachel Weisz as Junior Executive

== Production ==
Stephen Norrington had worked as an effects technician in the industry on several high-profile films, but by the end of the 80s Norrington began to lose interest in effects work and began pursuing writing with Death Machine being one of a few ideas Norrington considered. While Norrington struggled to find backing for his projects he continued in his field of effects work and met producer Vic Bateman during production of Split Second. Bateman was impressed with Norrington's script Speeder (described as a cross between The Terminator and A Nightmare on Elm Street), which was being primed as a possible follow-up to Split Second. Bateman introduced Norrington to fellow producer Dominic Anciano and after reading the script for Death Machine was impressed by the potential worldwide appeal and produced the film as a co-production between Entertainment Film Distributors and Japanese based Victor Company. The film began production at Pinewood Studios in September 1993 with production continuing for a period of three months.

== Release ==
Trimark Pictures released Death Machine direct to video in the US on November 14, 1995.

== Reception ==
In retrospective reviews, ScreenAnarchy and Bloody Disgusting both praised Dourif's acting. In a later roundup of Dourif's best horror roles, Bloody Disgusting called Death Machine "frankly kind of terrible" but recommended it anyway for Dourif's performance.

== Awards ==
=== Sitges Film Festival ===
| Year | Category | Result |
|---|---|---|
| 1995 | Best Special Effects | Nominated |
| 1995 | Best Actor (Brad Dourif) | Nominated |

=== Fantafestival ===
| Year | Category | Result |
|---|---|---|
| 1994 | Best Special Effects | Won |
