= Julie Benz =

American actress (born 1972)

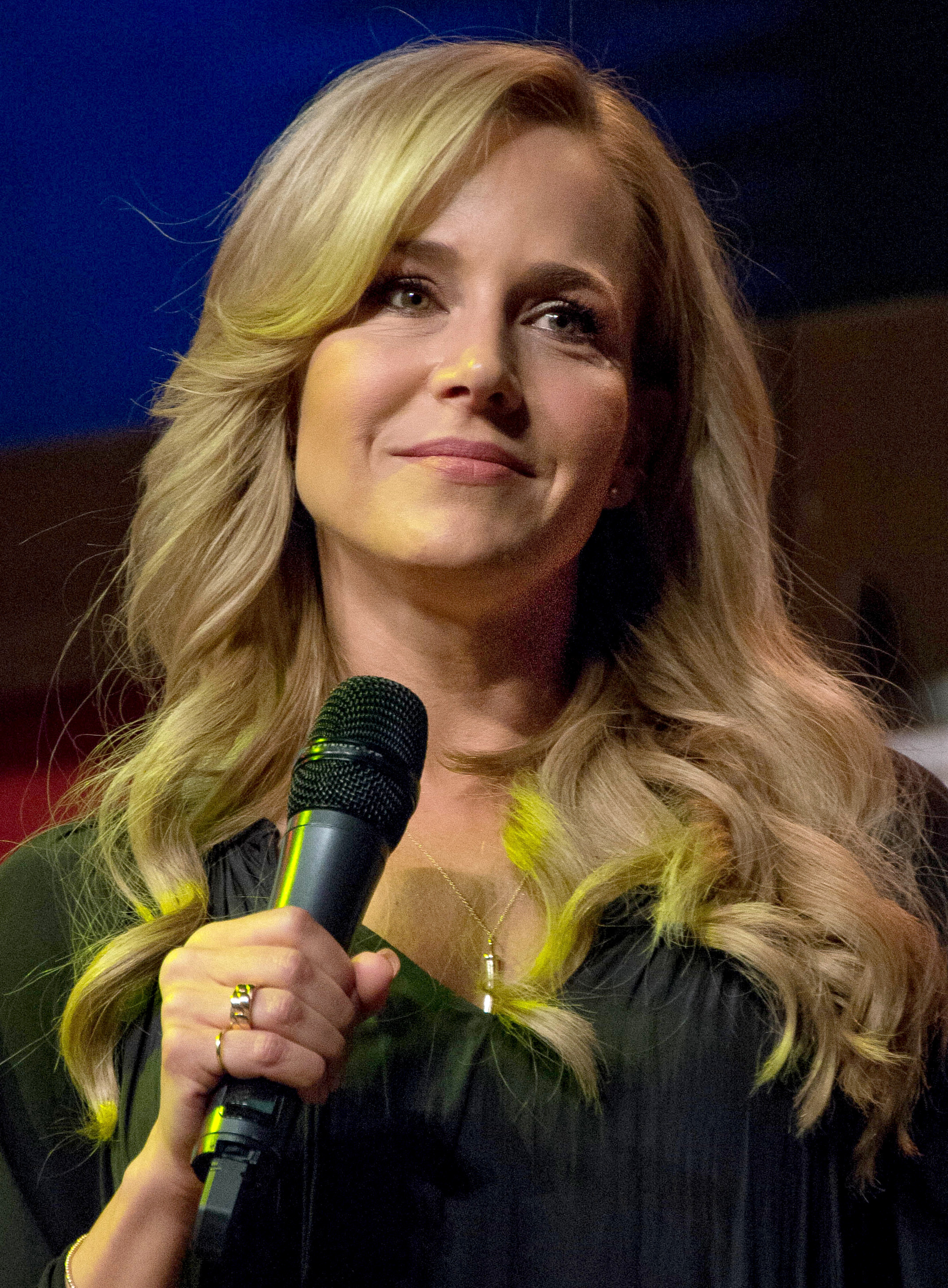
- Benz in 2016
- Born: May 1, 1972 (age 54); Pittsburgh, Pennsylvania, U.S.
- Education: New York University (BFA)
- Occupation: Actress
- Years active: 1987–present
- Spouses: John Kassir (m. 1998; div. 2007); Rich Orosco (m. 2012)

Julie Benz (born May 1, 1972) is an American actress. She is known for her roles as Darla on Buffy the Vampire Slayer and Angel (1997–2004), and as Rita Bennett on Dexter (2006–2010), for which she won the 2006 Satellite Award for Best Supporting Actress and the 2009 Saturn Award for Best Supporting Actress.

Benz had starring roles on Training Day (2017), Defiance (2013–2015), No Ordinary Family (2010–2011) and also had recurring roles in the television series Roswell (1999–2000), Desperate Housewives (2010), A Gifted Man (2011–2012), Hawaii Five-0 (2015–2017), and Love, Victor (2021).

Her film credits include Jawbreaker (1999), The Brothers (2001), Rambo (2008), Saw V (2008), Punisher: War Zone (2008), and The Boondock Saints II: All Saints Day (2009).

== Early life and education ==
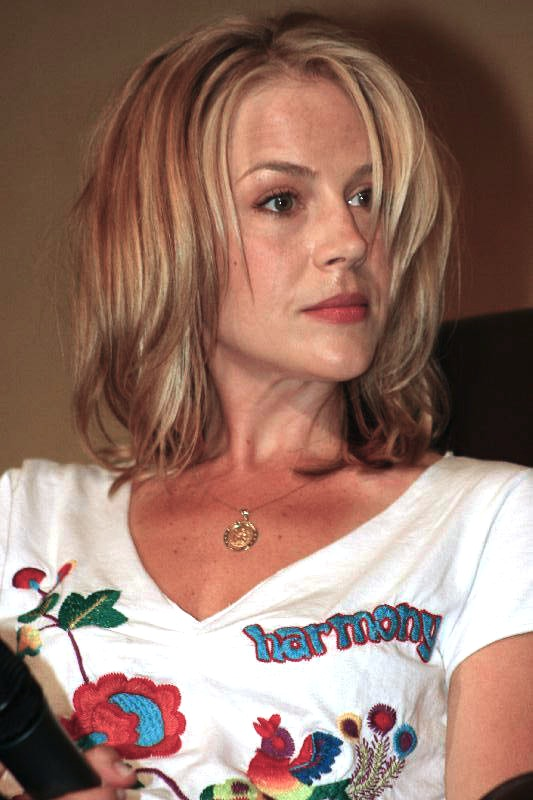
Benz in 2005

Benz was born in Pittsburgh on May 1, 1972. Her mother, Joanne Marie (née Seemiller), was a figure skater, and her father, George Benz Jr., is a surgeon in Pittsburgh. Benz is of German and Welsh descent.

The family settled in nearby Murrysville, Pennsylvania, when Benz was two, and she started ice skating when she was three. Her older siblings, Jeffrey and Jennifer, were 1987 U.S. junior ice dancing champions who competed at the 1986 World Junior Figure Skating Championships in Sarajevo.

When Benz was 14, she suffered a stress fracture in her right leg and had to take time off from skating. The following year, at age 15, Benz says she was told by an acting coach that she would never succeed as an actress. "I remember the teacher telling me I should not even try acting. I still have the report card where she was like, 'You will never be an actor. Your voice is horrible.' That was the best thing that ever happened to me because I was like, 'I'll show you'," she later said.

By 1989, with her figure skating career over, Benz became involved in local theater and was cast in the play Street Law. Her first film role was a small speaking part in "The Black Cat" segment of the Dario Argento/George A. Romero horror film Two Evil Eyes (1990). A year later, she was cast in the TV show Hi Honey, I'm Home! (1991), which was cancelled after two seasons.

Benz attended and graduated from Franklin Regional High School in Murrysville in 1990, after which she studied acting at New York University Tisch School of the Arts.

== Career ==
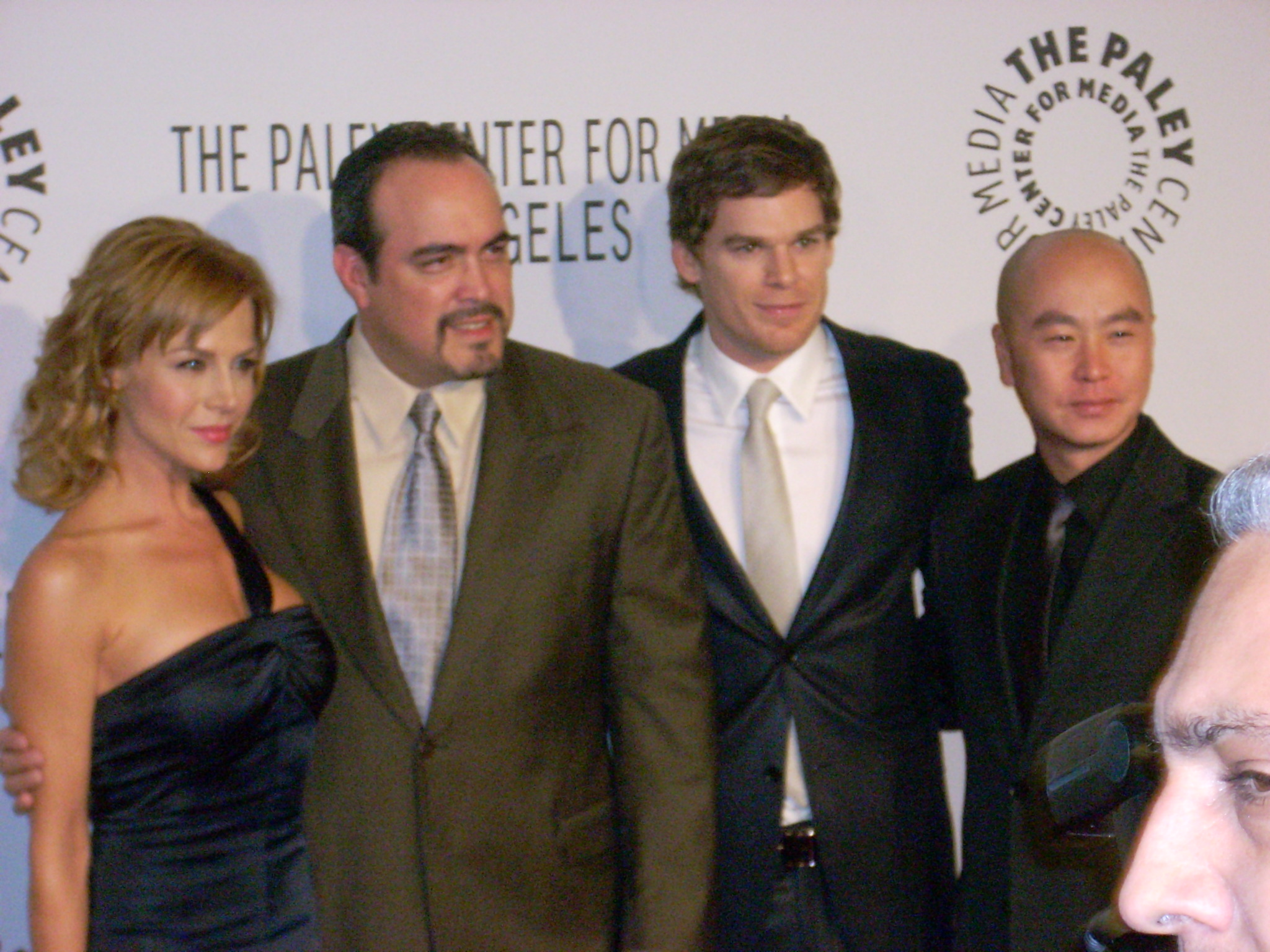
Benz with the cast of Dexter in 2008

After graduating from New York University in 1993, she moved to Los Angeles. Two weeks after her move, she obtained a bit part in a 1994 episode of Married... with Children, playing a girl who wanted to lose her virginity to Bud Bundy. Her subsequent roles included an unaired Aaron Spelling television pilot Crosstown Traffic. She starred in another unaired TV pilot called Empire in 1995. Her other TV shows included Hang Time, High Tide, Step by Step, and Boy Meets World, plus a small role in the television film The Barefoot Executive.

During the 1990s, her acting career was varied and steady. She had an uncredited role in Black Sheep and her appearance in Diagnosis: Murder as top figure skater "Julie" allowed her to demonstrate her skating talent. Later TV appearances included characters on Sliders and The Single Guy. She played Christy in the television film Hearts Adrift and a lead role as Julie Falcon in Darkdrive.

In 1996, Benz auditioned for the role of Buffy Summers for the television series Buffy the Vampire Slayer, but lost the role to Sarah Michelle Gellar. However, she was offered the small role of the vampire Darla, in the pilot episode. Her performance was so well-received that her part was expanded to a few more episodes.

This role helped launch her career and Benz appeared in guest appearances in more TV shows such as The Big Easy and Fame L.A., along with a small role as a receptionist in the film As Good as It Gets (1997). She starred in the short spoof film Eating Las Vegas and the unaired TV pilot Veronica's Video, had a small uncredited role in the television film A Walton Easter, and a small role in Inventing the Abbotts.

In 1998, she had a recurring role as Joplin Russell in the TV show Ask Harriet, then guest starred on both Conrad Bloom and The King of Queens. She made two films, the dark comedy Jawbreaker and Dirt Merchant, before landing a lead role in the TV series Payne, an American remake of the British sitcom Fawlty Towers. It was cancelled after eight episodes had aired.

Benz reprised her role as Darla in 2000 for the Buffy the Vampire Slayer spin-off series Angel, appearing in every season for at least one episode. Benz was a guest host for the TV show Rendez-View, cast as Ellie Sparks in Glory Days and appeared in the unaired pilot; however, she left the show. Later, she guest-starred on She Spies, was in the featured cast for the miniseries Taken, did various voices for the video game Hot Shots Golf Fore!, appeared in the short film The Midget Stays in the Picture, and took over the role of Ursula for George of the Jungle 2.

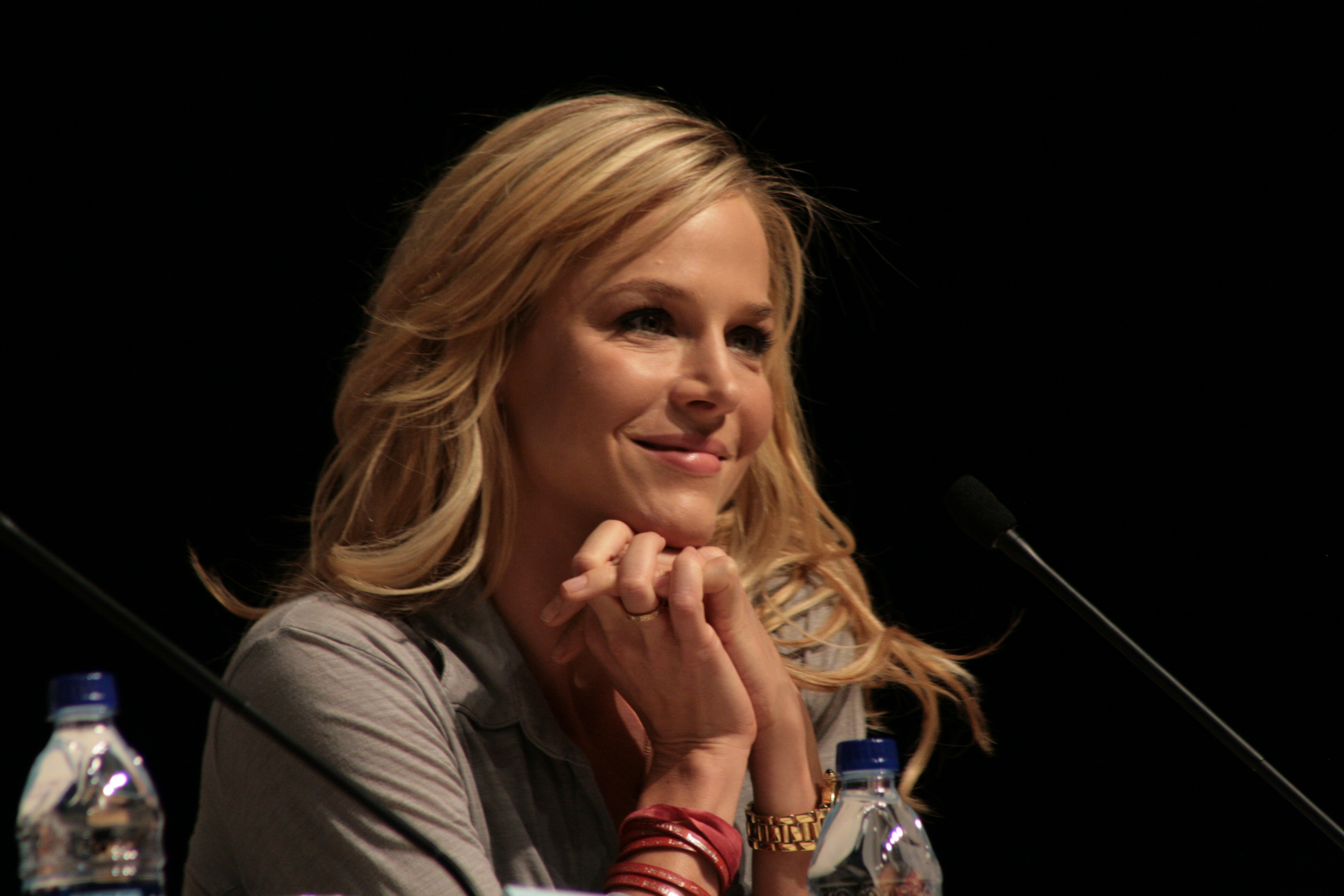
Benz in 2009

Benz appeared in Peacemakers, Coupling, NCIS, and Oliver Beene. She landed the lead role of Annie Garrett in the television film The Long Shot and provided the voice of Miranda Keyes for the video game Halo 2, though she did not return to the role in the sequel Halo 3, as Bungie wanted to try a new direction with the Miranda Keyes voice by giving the character an accent. She portrayed Danielle in the direct-to-DVD film Bad Girls from Valley High in 2005. She had a small role in the critically acclaimed television film Lackawanna Blues.

In the Sci-Fi Channel original film Locusts: The 8th Plague, she played the lead female role Vicky. She also appeared in the straight-to-DVD film 8mm 2 as Lynn. The film was originally called The Velvet Side of Hell and was not supposed to be a sequel to 8MM. Benz appeared in episodes of Supernatural, CSI: Miami, Law & Order, and CSI: Crime Scene Investigation. She had a supporting role in the Swedish independent film Kill Your Darlings (2006), a lead role in the television film Circle of Friends (2006), and joined the cast of the TV show Dexter as Rita Bennett, Dexter Morgan's girlfriend and eventual wife. Benz played a lead role in the fifth film of the popular Saw horror franchise, Saw V, as Brit, a real estate developer who is one of Jigsaw's five victims. Benz had a supporting role in Punisher: War Zone as Angela and co-starred with Sylvester Stallone in Rambo (2008), the fourth film of the series.

She played the title role in the short film Kidnapping Caitlynn, written by her close friend Jenny Mollen, which premiered at the Vail Film Festival 2009 and was released online April 6, 2009. She starred in the television film Held Hostage as Michelle Estey. in July. She also starred in the television film Uncorked (2009) as Johnny Prentiss which premiered in the UK in July 2009. She is the lead female character Special Agent Eunice Bloom in The Boondock Saints II: All Saints Day which had a limited release on October 30, 2009, and was released on DVD March 9, 2010. She has been cast in another indie film called Bedrooms as Anna. She played Frankie in the 2011 film Answers to Nothing.

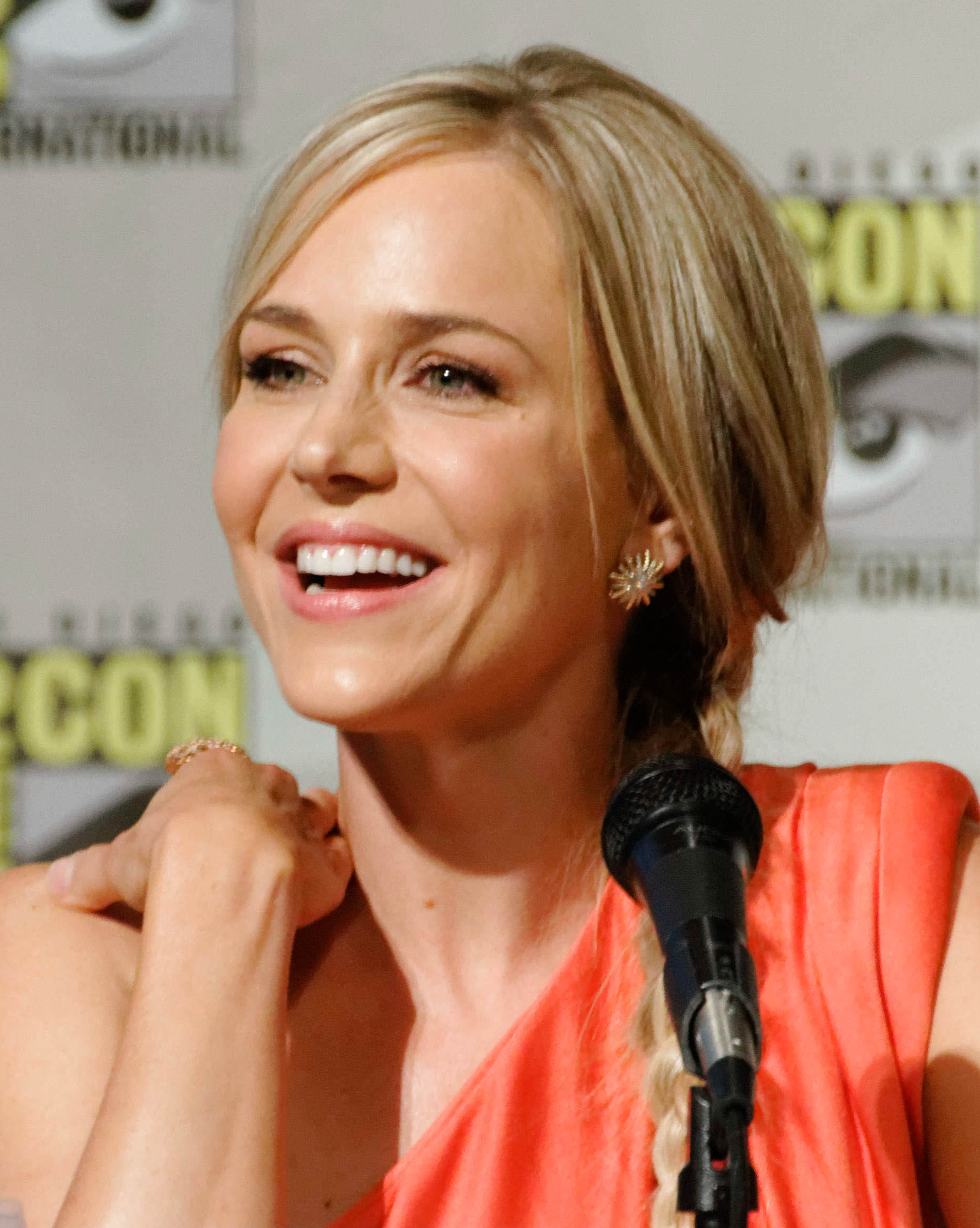
Benz at the 2012 San Diego Comic-Con

Benz appeared on The Soup with Joel McHale. Benz next took a recurring role on Desperate Housewives as Robin Gallagher, a stripper with a heart of gold and a master's degree in education who gets offered the chance to transition into a more legitimate career. The character of Robin is further developed when the audience discovers she is a lesbian and begins an affair with housewife Katherine Mayfair (Dana Delany). After the fourth season finale of Dexter, in which her character is murdered, Benz returned for the fifth-season premiere in a flashback scene.

In early 2010, ABC announced that Benz had landed a lead role as Stephanie Powell in the network's drama pilot No Ordinary Family. Production of the series commenced in May and it premiered in September 2010, as part of the 2010–11 season. In May 2011 No Ordinary Family was cancelled after one season with only 20 episodes filmed.

In 2011, she was cast in the new CBS TV show A Gifted Man. Originally a co-star, she was later downgraded to a recurring role. A Gifted Man was cancelled by CBS in May 2012 after one season of 16 episodes. She was cast in the television film Ricochet as Elise Laird. Benz played the lead female role, Mayor Amanda Rosewater, in the science fiction series Defiance and also starred in the film Supremacy and the unaired TV pilot Middle Ages.

In 2015, Benz landed a recurring role in the CBS series Hawaii Five-O, playing the latest team member and Chin Ho's girlfriend, Abby Dunn. She also starred in the television film Charming Christmas.

In 2021, she guest-starred in the TV series Love, Victor.

== Personal life ==
Benz married actor John Kassir on May 30, 1998. She filed for divorce in December 2007.

In 2011, she became engaged to Rich Orosco. They married on May 5, 2012.

== Filmography ==
=== Film ===
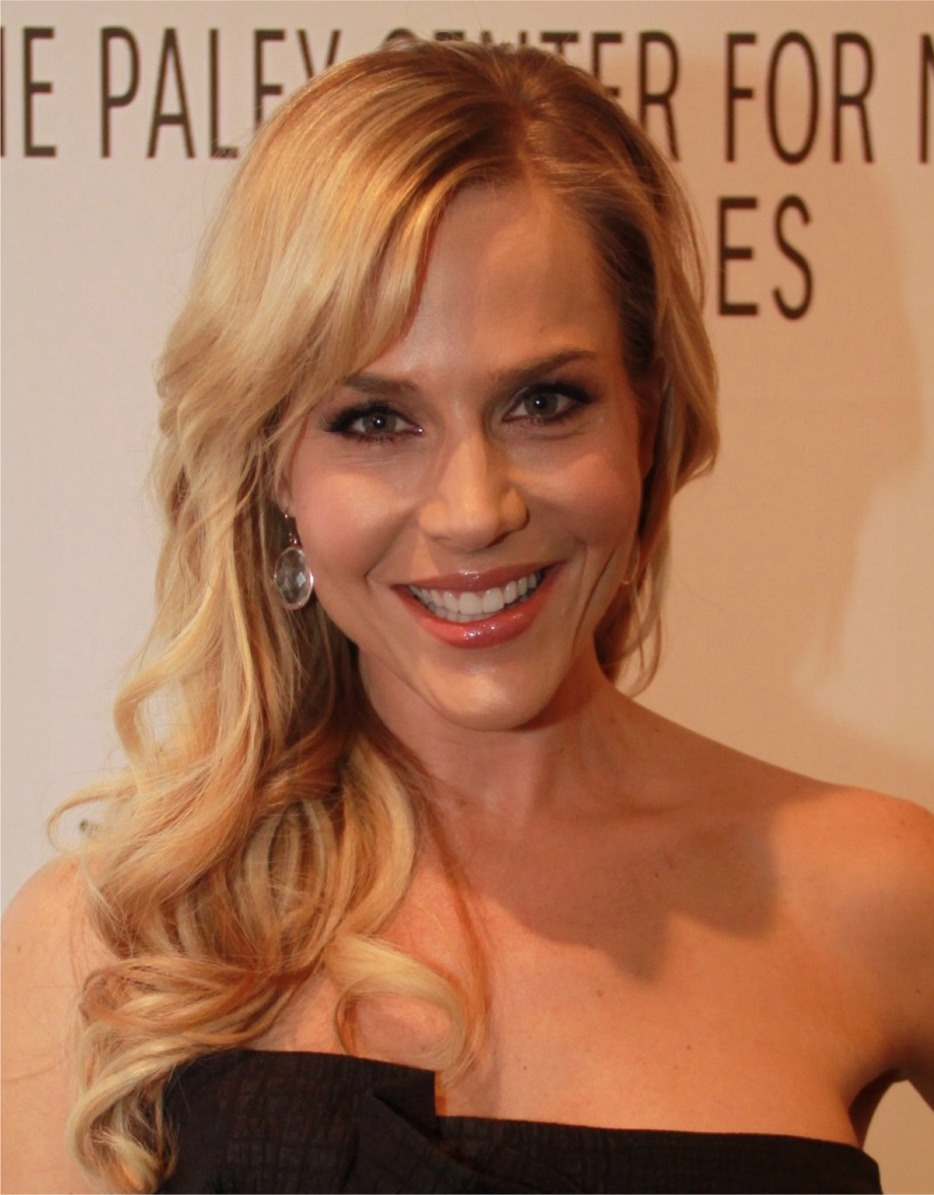
Benz in 2010

Year	Title	Role	Notes
1990	Two Evil Eyes	Betty	Segment: "The Black Cat"
1996	Darkdrive	Julie Falcon	
1997	As Good as It Gets	Receptionist	
1997	Inventing the Abbotts	Co-ed	
1999	Dirt Merchant	Angie	
1999	Jawbreaker	Marcie Fox	
2000	Bad Girls from Valley High	Danielle	
2000	Shriek If You Know What I Did Last Friday the 13th	Barbara	Direct-to-video film
2001	The Brothers	Jesse Caldwell	
2003	George of the Jungle 2	Ursula Stanhope, Queen of the Jungle	Direct-to-video film
2004	The Long Shot	Annie Garrett	
2005	8mm 2	Lynn	Direct-to-video film
2006	Kill Your Darlings	Katherine	
2008	Punisher: War Zone	Angela Donatelli	
2008	Rambo	Sarah Miller	
2008	Saw V	Brit	
2009	The Boondock Saints II: All Saints Day	Special Agent Eunice Bloom	
2010	Bedrooms	Anna	
2011	Answers to Nothing	Frankie	
2011	Ricochet	Elise Laird	
2014	Supremacy	Kristen	
2015	Circle	Wife	
2015	Life on the Line	Carline	
2016	Havenhurst	Jackie	
2019	Foster Boy	Pamela Dupree	
2020	Nocturne	Cassie Lowe	

=== Television ===
Year	Title	Role	Notes
1991–1992	Hi Honey, I'm Home!	Babs Nielson	Main role
1991–1992	All My Children	Linda Connor	Guest appearances: December 31, 1991 – January 2, 1992
1994	Married... with Children	Sascha	Episode: "Field of Screams"
1995	The Barefoot Executive	Sexy Woman	Television film
1995	Hang Time	Linda Cantrell	Episode: "Earl Makes the Grade"
1995	High Tide	Joanna Craig	Episode: "Sea No Evil"
1995	Step by Step	Tawny	Episode: "The Wall"
1996	Boy Meets World	Bianca	Episode: "City Slackers"
1996	Diagnosis: Murder	Julie Miller	Episode: "Murder on Thin Ice"
1996	Hearts Adrift	Christy	Television film
1996	The Single Guy	Cranberries Girl	Episode: "Love Train"
1996	Sliders	Jenny Michener	Episode: "The Electric Twister Acid Test"
1997	The Big Easy	Roxanne	Episode: "BeGirled"
1997	Fame L.A.	Vanessa	Episode: "The Beat Goes On"
1997–2000	Buffy the Vampire Slayer	Darla	Recurring role (5 episodes)
1998	Ask Harriet	Joplin Russell	Recurring role
1998	Conrad Bloom	Julie	Episode: "The Rebound Guy"
1999	The King of Queens	Julie Patterson	Episode: "Train Wreck"
1999	Payne	Breeze O'Rourke	Main role
1999–2000	Roswell	Kathleen Topolsky	Recurring role (season 1)
2000	Satan's School for Girls	Alison Kingsley	Television film
2000–2004	Angel	Darla	Recurring role (seasons 1–3); guest role (seasons 4–5)
2002	Coupling	Amanda	Episode: "Decatur Guy"
2002	Peacemakers	Miranda Blanchard	Episode: "The Witness"
2002	She Spies	Elaine	Episode: "Spies vs. Spy"
2002	Taken	Kate Keyes	Miniseries
2004	The Long Shot: Believe in Courage	Annie Garrett	Television film
2004	NCIS	Denise Johnson	Episode: "A Weak Link"
2004	Oliver Beene	Cigarette girl	Episode: "Idol Chatter"
2005	Lackawanna Blues	Laura	Television film
2005	Locusts: The 8th Plague	Vicky	Television film
2006	Circle of Friends	Maggie	Television film
2006	CSI: Crime Scene Investigation	Heidi Wolff	Episode: "Time of Your Death"
2006	CSI: Miami	Hayley Gordon	Episode: "Deviant"
2006	Supernatural	Layla Rourke	Episode: "Faith"
2006–2010	Dexter	Rita Bennett	Main role (season 1–4); guest role (season 5)
2007	Law & Order	Dawn Sterling	Episode: "Church"
2009	Held Hostage	Michelle Estey	Television film
2009	Uncorked	Johnny Prentiss	Television film
2010	Desperate Housewives	Robin Gallagher	Recurring role (season 6)
2010–2011	No Ordinary Family	Stephanie Powell	Main role
2011	Royal Pains	Elyse	Episode: "An Apple a Day"
2011–2012	A Gifted Man	Christina Holt	Recurring role (season 1)
2013	Sole Custody	Zoe	Television film
2013	Taken: The Search for Sophie Parker	Stevie Parker	Television film
2013–2015	Defiance	Amanda Rosewater	Main role
2015	Charming Christmas	Meredith Rossman	Television film
2015–2017	Hawaii Five-0	Abby Dunn	Recurring role (season 6–7)
2017	Christmas Homecoming	Amanda	Television film
2017	Training Day	Holly Butler	Main role
2019	Dark/Web	Rideshare	Episode: "Rideshare"
2019	Light as a Feather	Skye Karras	Episode: "...Guilty as Sin"
2019	On Becoming a God in Central Florida	Carole Wilkes	Recurring role
2019	V. C. Andrews' Heaven	Kitty Dennison	Television film
2021	Love, Victor	Shelby	Guest role
2021	Secrets of a Gold Digger Killer	Celeste Beard	Television film
2022	9-1-1: Lone Star	Sadie	Guest role

=== Video games ===
Year	Title	Role	Notes
2004	Hot Shots Golf Fore!	Phoebe and Amy	
2004	Halo 2	Miranda Keyes	

== Awards and nominations ==
Year	Award	Category	Nominated work	Result
2006	11th Satellite Awards	Satellite Award for Best Supporting Actress - Series, Miniseries or Television Film	Dexter	Won
2008	Eyegore Awards	Eyegore Award		Won
2008	2008 Scream Awards	Best Horror Actress	Dexter	Nominated
2009	16th Screen Actors Guild Awards	Screen Actors Guild Award for Outstanding Performance by an Ensemble in a Drama Series	Dexter	Nominated
2010	17th Screen Actors Guild Awards	Screen Actors Guild Award for Outstanding Performance by an Ensemble in a Drama Series	Dexter	Nominated
2010	36th Saturn Awards	Saturn Award for Best Supporting Actress on Television	Dexter	Won
2010	Monte Carlo Television Festival	Outstanding Actress - Drama Series	Dexter	Nominated
2010	2010 Scream Awards	Best Horror Actress	Dexter	Nominated
