= Velocity Trap =

1999 television film directed by Phillip J. Roth

- Written by: Patrick Phillips; Phillip J. Roth
- Directed by: Phillip J. Roth
- Starring: Olivier Gruner; Alicia Coppola; Ken Olandt
- Composers: Jim Goodwin; Richard McHugh; Mike Slamer
- Country of origin: United States
- Original language: English

Production
- Producers: Christian McIntire; Ken Olandt; Phillip J. Roth; Elizabeth Weintraub
- Cinematography: Philip D. Schwartz
- Editor: Christian McIntire
- Running time: 89 minutes

Velocity Trap is a 1999 American television film directed by Phillip J. Roth and starring Olivier Gruner, Alicia Coppola, and Ken Olandt.

== Plot ==
The main character, Ray Stokes (Olivier Gruner) is a down-on-his luck police officer on a distant, corruptly-ruled mining colony. He has already lost his wife Dana (Anna Karin) to his corrupt boss, John Dawson (Craig Wasson), not from any failure in romantic rivalry, but as part of a deal to pay off their dead daughter's medical bills: making her Dawson's "Contract Wife".

Samuel Nelson (Harry Wowchuk), an Enforcement Division chief of security, is sent to clean up the colony's local Enforcement Division, but is killed in the course of his investigation. Stokes is framed for the murder of another ED officer (Yannick Bisson), also killed by Nelson's assassin. However, Dawson is implicated in Nelson's death and wants to avoid any inquiry. He sends Stokes on a six-month trip to Earth, protecting a cargo of cash.

Meanwhile, the crew of The Endeavour has planned to intercept the money ship while the crew are in hibernation. The interception occurs, leaving Stokes and Beth Sheffield (Alicia Coppola), the attractive female navigator, the only survivors of the ensuing gun battles; they steal the money and buy the mining colony. Dawson is arrested for his part in Nelson's death.
