= Olivier Gruner =

French actor and kickboxer

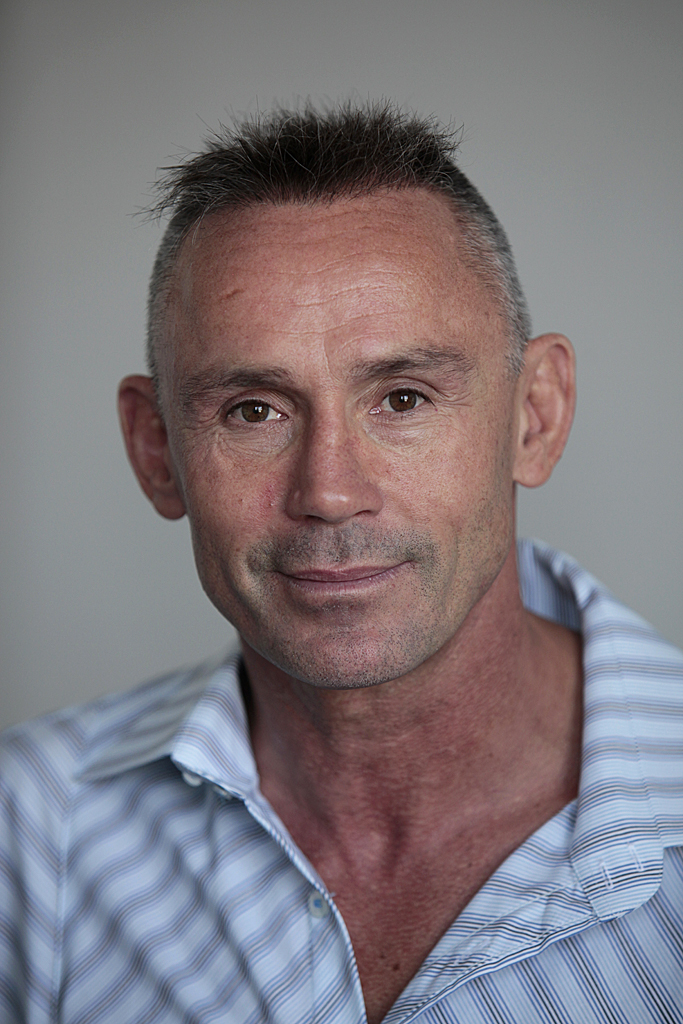
- Gruner in January 2011
- Born: Olivier Gruner; 2 August 1960 (age 66); Paris, France
- Other name: O.G.
- Occupations: Actor; director; producer; screenwriter; martial artist; trainer; bodyguard; pilot
- Years active: 1981–1988 (martial arts); 1989–present (acting)
- Height: 6 ft 1 in (1.85 m)
- Children: 1
- Martial arts career
- Division: Middleweight
- Style: Karate; kickboxing
- Website: www.oliviergruner.com
- Military career
- Allegiance: France
- Branch: French Navy
- Service years: 1978–1981
- Unit: Commandos Marine

Olivier Gruner (French: [ɔlivje ɡʁyne]) (born 2 August 1960) is a French actor, filmmaker, martial artist and former kickboxer. Born in Paris, he moved back to France in 1988 after serving in the French Armed Forces and competing as a professional kickboxer, during which time he won a silver medal at the W.A.K.O. World Championships. He has appeared in over 40 films and 4 television series and is best known for martial arts and action films.

== Early life and education ==
Gruner was born into a French family with parents in the surgery and engineering industry.

Gruner began martial arts at the age of 11 after watching a Bruce Lee movie, which inspired him to pursue both martial arts and a potential career in the film industry. Being constantly bullied at school further motivated him to learn martial arts to defend himself. He began studying Shotokan karate, then boxing, kickboxing, and full contact kickboxing.

In 1978, at age 18, he joined the French Navy, volunteering for their Commandos Marine unit, also nicknamed the Bérets Verts (Green Berets). He was operational in Djibouti and Somalia, where he was particularly involved in anti-piracy operations.

== Kickboxing ==
In 1981, Gruner left the military with the aim of training full-time to compete professionally as a kickboxer.

In 1984, he began fighting as a professional kickboxer. By 1985, his successes in the ring allowed him to fight full-time. Later that same year he won a silver medal in the 1985 W.A.K.O. World Championships.

Gruner retired from professional kickboxing in 1987 and pursued an acting career, following the lead of bodybuilders Reg Park and Arnold Schwarzenegger. To promote himself, Gruner plastered posters of himself around Cannes during the 1987 Cannes Film Festival, which caught the attention of a movie producer. Gruner was invited to Los Angeles for screen tests.

== Film career ==
Gruner joined Imperial Entertainment Corporation and began acting in action movies. He has appeared in martial arts magazines, such as Budo Journal, Combat, Impact, Inside Karate, Inside Kung Fu Yearbook and many more.

In 1989, he starred in his first movie: the urban action movie Angel Town. Although the film was not well received, Gruner's screen presence was notable, and his acting was compared favorably to Dolph Lundgren.

In 1992, Gruner starred as "Alex Raine" in Albert Pyun's cyberpunk 1992 science fiction thriller Nemesis. Critics appreciated the amazing movie stunts, thrilling action sequences, and innovative special effects pushing the film industry limits like Blade Runner and Terminator 2. Both Nemesis and Angel Town were popular in video distribution, and Nemesis is one of the movies Gruner is most proud of.

In 2010, Gruner played Corsair Duguay in Tales of an Ancient Empire.

Gruner played Jagger in Escape from Paradise (2019), and Duguay in Cyborg Nemesis: The Dark Rift (2019), and The Target (2019).

=== 2000s: Television ===
In 1999, Gruner appeared as Dieter Vanderval in the episode titled "Wildlife" of the series Martial Law.

In 2001, he appeared multiple times as Tawrens, in a 26-episode television series Code Name: Eternity.

In 2005, NBC hired Gruner to produce a TV series named The Pros, a Way of Life, a project that Gruner had started in 2003. It portrayed life behind the scenes, training, and the discipline required of professional athletes. Gruner had completed episodes on professional boxers, surfers, and MMA fighters, when NBC decided to shelve the series, and it was never released. A separate video published by Gruner is available.

Gruner played Ivan in the television series Seven Days, which premiered in 2019.

=== 2010s: Directing ===
Gruner's first involvement as a director was in 2002 with Interceptor Force 2.

In 2011, he premiered his first feature film as a screenwriter, a director, and an actor, titled Re-Generator. This film was previously known as One Night, a project Gruner had been working on since 2010.

In 2014, he featured as a director in Sector 4: Extraction, a direct-to-video release.

In 2015, Gruner released one more film as a director, a producer, a screenwriter, and an actor: EP/Executive Protection.

=== Film producing ===
Early in his career, Gruner got involved in the production of some of the films in which he was appearing as an actor. This is the case for Savage (1996), Mercenary (1996), Mercenary 2: Thick & Thin (1998), Interceptor Force (1999), The Circuit (2001), and Crooked (2005).

But it was only starting in the 2010s, except Interceptor Force 2 in 2002, that he accumulated his involvement both as a producer, as an actor, and as a director in One Night (2010), Re-Generator (2011), Sector 4: Extraction (2014), and EP/Executive Protection (2015).

He has also been involved, as a producer-only, in Front Line (2015). He was both an actor and a producer in Iron Cross: The Road to Normandy (2018).

=== Screenwriting ===
Gruner co-wrote the stories of some of the movies in which he appeared as an actor.

He wrote the stories of T.N.T. (1997), Interceptor Force 2 (2002), Crooked (2005), One Night (2010), Re-Generator (2011), and EP/Executive Protection (2015).

He also co-wrote the story and the screenplay of Lost Warrior: Left Behind (2008), and co-wrote the story of Sector 4: Extraction (2014).

== Business activities ==
Gruner has always been involved in several other business activities.

=== Personal Protection Agent ===
Gruner occasionally provides personal or close protection for celebrities. Many clients prefer an actor who understands the pressure and demands. Gruner does in fact have military training from the Bérets Verts, and that is enough experience for many clients. One of such body-guarding clients is the famous Canadian singer Celine Dion.

However, Gruner also provides body-guarding training at his academy "Gruner Tactical" Or "Gruner Tactical Training Academy."

=== Training videos ===
Gruner has been producing training videos for martial arts, combat skills, bodyguarding, and survival techniques since 2012. He commercializes those under the various brands of "Gruner Tactical Training Academy" and "O.G Training". More recently, he has been producing a survival reality show video series under the name "Survival X" in 2018.

=== Personal training ===
Gruner has always kept a side activity as a personal trainer in various martial arts such as kickboxing and mixed martial arts. He usually dedicates this personal training time to competing martial artists, as well as retired champions.

=== Helicopter piloting ===
Gruner is a licensed helicopter pilot, which allows him to mix this activity with film-producing requirements at times. For example, he worked for ABC News in Los Angeles where he did many chase videos and saw a lot of damage and lethal encounters.

He regularly flies helicopters and considers it a big part of his life. For Blue Hawaiian Helicopters, he regularly flew tours on Hawaii's Big Island. For Maverick Helicopters, he also flew tours over the Grand Canyon.

== Personal life ==
Gruner lives part-time in both Santa Monica, California and Las Vegas, Nevada. He has one son.

He has been regularly maintaining his karate, boxing and kickboxing training, which he has been completing with Brazilian jiu-jitsu, wrestling and mixed martial arts.

== Kickboxing titles ==
- 1985 W.A.K.O. World Championships - Men's Full-Contact Middleweight (silver) -75 kg

== Filmography ==
=== Films ===
Year	Title	Involved as				Role	Notes
Year	Title	Director	Producer	Writer	Actor	Role	Notes
1990	Angel Town				Yes	Jacques Montaigne	First lead and movie
1990	Lionheart						Received thanks for facilitating access to Somalia photos used in the film via Gruner French military connections
1992	Nemesis				Yes	Alex Raine	
1994	Automatic				Yes	J269	Fight Choreographer
1995	Savate (aka The Fighter)				Yes	Joseph Charlegrand	Video, Fight choreographer
1996	Savage		Yes		Yes	Alex Verne / Savage	Associate producer
1996	Mercenary		Yes		Yes	Captain Karl 'Hawk' May	Video, Associate producer, Fight choreographer
1997	Mars				Yes	Caution Templar	
1997	T.N.T.			Yes	Yes	Alex Girard	
1998	Mercenary 2: Thick & Thin		Yes		Yes	Captain Karl 'Hawk' May	TV movie, Co-executive producer
1999	Velocity Trap				Yes	ED Officer Raymond Stokes	
1999	The White Pony				Yes	Jacques	
1999	Storm						Video, Helicopter co-pilot
1999	Interceptor Force		Yes		Yes	Lieutenant Sean Lambert	Producer
2000	Crackerjack 3				Yes	Marcus Clay	
2000	Kumite				Yes	Michael Rogers	
2001	G.O.D.				Yes	Adrian Kaminski	
2001	Extreme Honor				Yes	Cody	
2001	The Circuit		Yes		Yes	Dirk Longstreet	Executive producer
2002	Power Elite				Yes	Captain	
2002	Interceptor Force 2	Yes		Yes	Yes	Lieutenant Sean Lambert	TV movie
2003	The Circuit 2: The Final Punch				Yes	Dirk Longstreet	Video, Executive producer, Helicopter pilot
2003	Deadly Engagement				Yes	Paul Gerard	
2004	SWAT: Warhead One				Yes	Luc Rémy	Video. Fight choreographer.
2005	Crooked		Yes	Yes	Yes	Phil Yordan	Also named Soft Target
2006	The Circuit 3: The Street Monk				Yes	Dirk Longstreet	Video, also named The Circuit 3: Final Flight
2007	Blizhniy Boy: The Ultimate Fighter				Yes	FBI Agent #1	
2008	Lost Warrior: Left Behind			Yes	Yes	Nash Daniels	Video, Co-writer story and screenplay
2008	Skorumpowani				Yes	Montenegro	
2009	Brother's War				Yes	Anton	
2010	One Night	Yes	Yes	Yes	Yes	The Beast	Director
2010	Tales of an Ancient Empire				Yes	Corsair Duguay	Also named Abelar: Tales of an ancient Empire
2011	Re-Generator	Yes	Yes	Yes	Yes	The Beast	Director
2013	Cyborg: Rise of the Slingers				Yes	Duguay	
2014	Sector 4: Extraction	Yes	Yes	Yes	Yes	Nash	Executive producer, Co-writer
2015	EP/Executive Protection	Yes	Yes	Yes	Yes	Max Webber	
2015	The whole World at our Feet				Yes	Tony	
2015	Frontline		Yes				Co-producer
2016	Assassin X				Yes	Ronus Steele	Also named The Chemist
2016	Beyond the Game				Yes	Nash Daniels	
2016	Showdown in Manila				Yes	Ford	
2016	Darkweb				Yes	Stanislas	
2017	Iron Cross Brothers Road Home				Yes		
2021	Amour				Yes	Robert	Short film
2021	Iron Cross: The road to Normandy		Yes		Yes	Anton	
2022	Gunfight at Rio Bravo				Yes	Marshall Austin Carter	
2022	Escape from Paradise †				Yes	Jagger	Pre-production
2022	Cyborg Nemesis: The Dark Rift †				Yes	Duguay	Film announced. Duguay role is rumored only.
2022	The Target †				Yes		Film announced.

Key
†	Denotes films that have not yet been released

=== Television ===
Year	Title	Role	Notes
1999	Martial Law	Dieter Vanderval	Wild Life (1999)
2000	Code Name: Eternity	Tawrens	The Shift (2000); All Fall Down (2000); Chameleon (2000); Underground (2000); The Box (2000); Not a Bite to Eat (2000); Dark of Night (2000); Project Midas (2000); Laura's Story (2000); All the News (2000); Sold Out for a Song (2000); Fatal Error (2000); Deep Down (2000); 24 Hours (2000); Lose Your Dreams (2000); Thief (2000); Bounty Hunter (2000); Death Trap (2000); Making Love (2000); Tawrens (2000); Never Go Home (2000); The Watery Grave (2000); The Long Drop (2000); The Hunter (2000); The Mission (2000); Ethaniel's Story (2000)
2005	The Pros, a way of life	Himself	Documentary TV Series partially produced and published by NBC before being shelved, video
2019	Seven Days	Ivan	Episode #1.1 (2019)
2020	CF3: Cult Fans, Films & Finds	Himself	Nemesis (1992) feat. Olivier Gruner & Thom Mathews (2020)
2021	The Circuit 2020	Dirk	Ranch Terror (2021); The Bank Heist (2021); Pawn Shop (2021); Wilderness (2021)

=== Documentaries ===
Year	Title	Role	Notes
2012	Tales of an Ancient Empire: Behind the Scenes	Himself	Video documentary

=== Stunts ===
Year	Title	Involved as	Role	Notes
1994	Automatic	Fight choreographer	J269	
1995	Savate (aka The Fighter)	Fight choreographer	Joseph Charlegrand	Video
1996	Mercenary	Fight choreographer	Captain Karl 'Hawk' May	Video, Associate producer
1996	Savage	Fight choreographer	Alex Verne / Savage	Associate producer
2003	The Circuit 2: The Final Punch	Action coordinator	Dirk Longstreet	Video, Executive producer, Helicopter pilot

== See also ==
- List of French actors
- List of French directors
- List of male kickboxers
