= Craig Wasson =

American actor (born 1954)

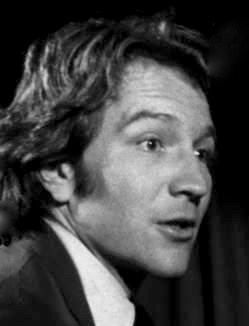
- Wasson in 1980
- Born: March 15, 1954 (age 72); Ontario, Oregon, U.S.
- Education: University of Oregon
- Occupation: Actor
- Years active: 1975–2011

Craig Wasson (born March 15, 1954) is an American actor. He made his film debut in Rollercoaster (1977). He is best known for his roles as Jake Scully in Brian DePalma's Body Double (1984), and Neil Gordon in Chuck Russell's A Nightmare on Elm Street 3: Dream Warriors (1987). For his role as Danilo Prozor in Arthur Penn's Four Friends (1981), he was nominated for a Golden Globe Award.

== Early life ==
Wasson was born March 15, 1954, in Ontario, Oregon and raised in Idaho.

== Career ==
Wasson made some early TV appearances starting in 1975 in small roles in episodes of The Bob Newhart Show, The Secrets of Isis, and The Streets of San Francisco. In 1977, he was cast in the TV series Phyllis (midway through the show's second season) as the title character's new son-in-law Mark. Mark was a hippie-ish singer/songwriter; Wasson's singing and guitar playing was heard occasionally in the four episodes in which he appeared. The series was cancelled shortly after the character's arrival.

Wasson's first feature film was the 1977 suspense thriller Rollercoaster. In 1978, he appeared in two films about the Vietnam war: first as a private in The Boys in Company C and then as a corporal in Go Tell the Spartans. He also wrote and sang the haunting folk song "Here I Am (In Vietnam)", which served as the theme song for The Boys in Company C.

Craig starred in the short-lived 1980 TV series Skag. In 1981, he played Don Wanderley, a junior English professor in the film Ghost Story, in which his character has a torrid sexual relationship with a mysterious secretary he later realizes is a ghost seeking vengeance. In 1982, he was nominated for the Golden Globe Award for New Star of the Year - Actor for his performance in Four Friends. He later starred as Jake Scully in the 1984 Brian De Palma suspense movie Body Double. His other big role was as Dr. Neil Gordon in the hit 1987 horror film A Nightmare on Elm Street 3: Dream Warriors. He starred alongside Heather Langenkamp, Robert Englund, Patricia Arquette, and Laurence Fishburne. In 1989, Wasson starred as James Madison in A More Perfect Union: America Becomes a Nation. His most recent movie roles are in Akeelah and the Bee and Sasquatch Mountain, both released in 2006.

Wasson was featured as Doug Ebert in the soap opera One Life to Live in 1991. He has made guest appearances in a number of series, including For Jenny with Love, Murder, She Wrote, M*A*S*H (TV series), Hart to Hart, Walker, Texas Ranger, Profiler, The Practice, Seven Days, and Star Trek: Deep Space Nine.

Wasson is also a prolific narrator for audio books, having narrated Stephen King's 2011 novel 11/22/63, and other books by Stephen King, as well as books by James Ellroy and John Grisham.

== Filmography ==
- Phyllis – Mark Valenti, Season 2, recurring (1976–1977)
- Rollercoaster (1977) – Hippie Boy
- The Bob Newhart Show Season 5 Episode 17 (1977) – Chuck Morgan
- The Boys in Company C (1978) – Dave Bisbee
- Go Tell the Spartans (1978) – Cpl. Stephen Courcey
- Hart to Hart Season 1 Episode 1 (1979) – Stephen Maxwell
- The Outsider (1980) – Michael Flaherty
- Carny (1980) – Mickey
- Schizoid (1980) – Doug
- Nights at O'Rear's (1980) – Max Corley
- Four Friends (1981) – Danilo Prozor
- Ghost Story (1981) – Don / David
- Second Thoughts (1983) – Will
- M*A*S*H Season 11 (1983) Episode 14: "Give and Take" – Private Kurland
- Great Performances: The Innocents Abroad (1983) – Mark Twain
- Body Double (1984) – Jake Scully
- Zoo Ship (1985) – (voice)
- The Men's Club (1986) – Paul
- Tales from the Darkside (1986, "The Geezenstacks") – Sam Hummel
- A Nightmare on Elm Street 3: Dream Warriors (1987) – Dr. Neil Gordon
- Bum Rap (1988) – Paul Colson
- Bush Shrink (1988) – Dr. Martin Cypher
- A More Perfect Union (1989) – James Madison
- L.A. Law S4 E21: "Outward Bound" (1990) – Tom Cavanaugh
- Midnight Fear (1991) – Paul
- Malcolm X (1992) – TV Host
- Strapped (1993) – Ben
- Dr. Quinn Medicine Woman (1994) – Julius Hoffman
- Murder, She Wrote (1994) – Hank Walden, Leslie's Father
- Trapped in Space (1995) – Palmer
- I Shot a Man in Vegas (1995) – Radio Caller (voice)
- Star Trek Deep Space Nine S4 E19: "Hard Time" (1996) – Ee'char
- The Tomorrow Man (1996) – Dr. Galloway
- Deep Family Secrets (1997) – Jack Winters
- Back to Even (1998) – Sasso
- Tian shang ren jian (1998) – Adam Peers
- Velocity Trap (1999) – John Dawson, RMC Corp.
- The Pornographer (1999) – Spano
- The Last Best Sunday (1999) – Deputy Sheriff Bennett
- The Storytellers (1999) – Larry Moore
- Under Pressure (2000) – Elgin Bates
- Danny and Max (2000) – Ralph
- Epoch (2001) – Hudson
- New Alcatraz (2001) – Warden Fred Riley
- Ghost Rock (2003) – Cherokee Bill
- Puerto Vallarta Squeeze (2004) – Danny Pastor
- Tracks (2005)
- Akeelah and the Bee (2006) – Ted Saunders
- Sasquatch Mountain (2006) – Travis Cralle
