= Supercollider (film) =

- Film poster
- Directed by: Jeffery Scott Lando
- Written by: Phillip J. Roth; Jeffery Scott Lando
- Produced by: Jeffery Scott Lando; Phillip J. Roth
- Starring: Robin Dunne; Amy Bailey; Mia Nordstrom; Brendan Beiser; Enzo Cilenti; Philip Rudy; Yana Marinova
- Cinematography: Alexander Krumov
- Edited by: Gigi Moreno
- Music by: Claude Foisy
- Production companies: Bulgarian Unified Film Organization; Supercollider Productions
- Distributed by: Albatros Film; Edel Media & Entertainment; Origin Releasing; Phase 4 Films; Prime Wave; Syfy
- Release date: November 2, 2013 (Canada)
- Running time: 84 minutes
- Countries: Bulgaria; Canada
- Language: English

Supercollider is a 2013 science fiction drama film produced by Jeffery Scott Lando and starring Robin Dunne. The film was poorly received.

== Plot ==
Victor wakes up with his wife, Natalie, and daughter, Jessica. He drops them off at a café on the way to work. He is part of a team of physicists building the world's largest super collider called the Zero Point Collider, which has the potential to produce unlimited free energy.

They start up the collider on a test run. However, Emily, another physicist, notices there is a calibration issue with the atomic clocks. Before they have a chance to investigate the collider explodes, devastating the area.

Victor wakes up confused in an alternate reality where the surrounding area has been destroyed by natural disasters. He is divorced from his wife and his daughter has died in a car accident. He bails his ex-wife Natalie out of jail after she was arrested for drunk and disorderly behaviour. A tornado hits, driving them underground. Victor recognises his colleague Emily in the underground shelter, and has flashbacks about the events with the Zero Point Collider. Natalie believes Victor has Memory Relapse Syndrome (MRS) so she recommends he sees Dr Frung, a psychologist.

Dr Frung tells Victor he has seen her before, but Victor has no memories of her. Victor tells the doctor about the collider explosion, and she claims that he has developed MRS as a coping mechanism after the death of his daughter.

Victor starts having dreams and flashbacks about the events before the collider exploded. He finds the iPhone at work that he had before the explosion and goes to a shop to find a charger for it but the assistant has never heard of an iPhone. He manages to make a charger, and uses the phone to contact his wife in the original reality. Both Natalie and his daughter are alive and act normally. He realizes this iPhone is his only link to the original reality.

Leo, Victor's partner, is concerned about what Victor is doing. Leo sends Chuck, a colleague, along with two investigators to retrieve the phone Victor took. They turn up at Victor's house, but he escapes before they see him

Victor visits Dr Frung again, showing her a recording of his daughter's 7th birthday on his phone. He tries to convince her that the explosion from the collider has created an alternate reality, but she doesn't believe him.

He tries to find Natalie, visiting her house; the investigators follow and attack him. He sets the house on fire, creating an explosion which stuns them, allowing him to escape.

He finds Natalie in a club, and leaves his phone telling her to watch the video of their daughter. The investigators find him again and capture him. Leo tortures him to find out where the iPhone is, but Victor won't tell him. Leo then injects Victor with a chemical that knocks him out.

Chuck turns up and takes Victor to Zero Point industries to see Leo. Leo admits he is trying to use the collider as a time machine, to see into the future and predict what the stock markets will do. Leo asks Victor to help him perfect the collider, but Victor turns him down.

Victor goes back to the club to find Natalie. She has watched the video of their daughter's birthday. Victor then explains to Natalie about the collider creating an alternate reality. He tells Natalie there is a virus on the phone which can restore everything back to normality.

Victor goes back to Zero Point industries to deploy the virus. He hacks into a computer and downloads the virus, but Chuck and the investigators find him and take him to Leo's office. Although one of Leo's thugs destroys the iPhone, it was after the virus download succeeded, but didn't affect the collider because the whole room was offline.

Leo threatens to kill Natalie unless Victor helps to perfect the collider. Chuck activates the phone virus, and then rescues Victor, shooting the security guards. However, Chuck is also shot.

Victor escapes, and goes to find Natalie. A tornado has hit, destroying the club, and Victor finds her buried under rubble. He consoles her before she dies.

The virus has sent the collider into overdrive, causing another massive explosion. This explosion sends Victor back to his original reality where his wife and daughter are still alive. Normality is restored, and Leo is arrested for stock manipulation.

== Cast ==
- Robin Dunne as Victor Susskind, a physicist working at Zero Point Industries
- Amy Bailey as Natalie Susskind, Victor's wife
- Mia Nordstrom as Jessica Susskind, Victor's daughter
- Brendan Beiser as Chuck, a network engineer at Zero Point Industries
- Enzo Cilenti as Leo Tarsky, Victor's partner at Zero Point Industries
- Yana Marinova as Doctor Frung, a psychological therapist
- Emilia Klayn as Emily Roberts, a physicist working at Zero Point Industries
- Phil Rudy as Gordon Stewart, a scientist working at Zero Point Industries
- Atanas Srebrev as Officer Osborn at Police Station

== Reception ==
Allocine gave the film a 2 out of 5, Film TV gave the film a 2.3 out of 5, Film Web gave the film a 3.8 out of 10, Next Film gave the film a 1 out of 5, Radio Times gave the film a 2 out of 5, and The Movie Scene gave the film a 2 out of 5.
