= Interceptor Force 2 =

2002 American television film

- Also known as: IF2: Interceptor Force 2
- Screenplay by: Patrick Phillips
- Directed by: Phillip Roth
- Starring: Olivier Gruner; Roger R. Cross; Adrienne Wilkinson; Elizabeth Gracen; Nigel Bennett
- Theme music composer: Tony Riparetti
- Country of origin: United States
- Original language: English

Production
- Producers: Jeffery Beach; Phillip Roth
- Cinematography: Todd Barron
- Editor: Ken Peters
- Production companies: Unified Film Organization; Interforce Productions; Media Entertainment GmbH; Co. 1 Filmproduktions HG; Sci Fi Pictures

Original release
- Network: Sci Fi Channel
- Release: November 30, 2002

IF2: Interceptor Force 2, commonly called Interceptor Force 2, is a 2002 Sci Fi Pictures science-fiction TV movie on the Sci Fi Channel. A sequel to the 1999 Sci Fi Channel telefilm Interceptor Force, it is directed by Phillip Roth, and stars Olivier Gruner, Roger R. Cross, Adrienne Wilkinson, Elizabeth Gracen and Nigel Bennett. Government-trained soldiers called the Interceptors are assigned to look at a crash site of an alien spacecraft in Russia where they find a 7-foot-tall (2.1 m) alien that can change shape.

== Plot ==
Over Grozny, Russia, a pair of fighter jets chase down an unidentified spacecraft moving at supersonic speeds. Within minutes, it is the jets that are chased and eventually blasted out of the sky by the spacecraft. Minutes later, residents report a "meteor" flying past the city and landing somewhere in the distant hills. Jack Bavaro, head of the Alpha Force, calls in Lieutenant Sean Lambert, the sole survivor of the first Alpha mission four years ago in Mexico. Lambert's entire team was killed while trying to capture a single specimen of extraterrestrial life. Now Weber wants Lambert to take a new team of interceptors into Russia to capture this new alien specimen.

Lambert and the Alpha Force fly to Grozny. The new team consists of science officer Dawn DeSilva and German Special Ops soldiers Bjorn Hatch, Nathan McAllister and Adriana Sikes. They find the wreckage of the alien spacecraft outside a Russian nuclear plant. Holes blasted in the razor fencing and thick concrete walls suggest the alien is inside.

The Alpha Force enters the nuclear plant and seal off the exits, creating a trap for the alien. But then, one by one, the team is killed off by a creature that possesses a laser weapon, can change its appearance, and can also regenerate itself completely from a single piece of alien tissue. Additionally, the alien has found a way to explode all the uranium fuel rods in the nuclear plant to create a lethal radiation cloud over Europe that will quickly spread and cover the rest of the world. Lambert and the remaining Alpha Force have 60 minutes to save themselves, and the Earth, from nuclear doom.

== Cast ==
- Olivier Gruner as Lieutenant Sean Lambert
- Roger R. Cross as Nathan McCallister
- Adrienne Wilkinson as Dr. Dawn DeSilvia
- Elizabeth Gracen as Adriana Sikes
- Alex Jolig as Bjorn Hatch
- Eve Scheer as The Woman
- Nigel Bennett as Director Jack Bavaro
- Richard Gnolfo as Jenkins
- Hristo Shopov as Commander Gorshkov
- Vladimir Kolev as First Officer
- Maxim Gentchev as Burly
- Yulian Vergov as Chechen Rebel Leader
- Georgi Borissov as Dimitrii Pavakori
- Georgi Ivanov as Sergey
- Alan Austin as The President (voice)

== Production ==
The film was produced by the Unified Film Organization and Interforce Productions, LLC, in association with Media Entertainment GmbH, Co. 1 Filmproduktions HG and Sci Fi Pictures. Aside from the crewmembers listed in the infobox, the crew includes production designer Kes Bonnet, digital effects supervisor David Ridlen, visual effects supervisor Alvaro Villagomez, and costume designer Irene Sinclair.

The original Interceptor Force (1999) had been the Sci Fi Channel's highest-rated TV-movie to that point.
