= Angel Town (film) =

1990 film directed by Eric Karson

- Directed by: Eric Karson
- Written by: S. N. Warren
- Produced by: Ash R. Shah; Eric Karson
- Starring: Olivier Gruner; Theresa Saldana; Frank Aragon; Tony Valentino; Peter Kwong; Mike Moroff
- Cinematography: John LeBlanc
- Edited by: Duane Hartzell
- Music by: Terry Plumeri
- Distributed by: Imperial Entertainment
- Release date: February 23, 1990
- Running time: 102 min
- Country: United States
- Language: English
- Box office: $855,810

Angel Town is a 1990 martial arts film directed by Eric Karson and starring Olivier Gruner in his film debut.

== Plot ==
Jacques Montaigne is a French college student who heads to Los Angeles not only for school, but to help train an Olympic team of fighters. He rents a room from single mother Maria Ordonez and her son Martin.

Gang leader Angel wants to recruit Martin. Jacques decides he must help Martin. During an attack at the house, Martin's grandmother passes out from and is taken to the hospital. With Maria working, Jacques takes Martin to a local martial arts school run by Henry, who is the one who convinced the Olympic Committee to bring Jacques to L.A. Jacques and Henry teach Martin self-defense.

When Maria and Jacques are shot at by Angel and his gang, Jacques turns to Henry and his wife to help protect Maria and Martin. Henry finds a connection with Mr. Park, a Korean gang boss. He warns Henry and Jacques that Angel can be intimidated, but it is his gunfire that gives him his power.

Angel escalates his war and begins with a vicious assault on Maria, who is taken to the hospital. Martin goes back to his house and arms himself with a shotgun. With the help of Frank, who arms himself with a machine gun, the duo begin to shoot at any of Angel's gang who invade Martin's house. When Angel and the rest of the gang show up, they slowly begin their assault. However, just when Martin runs out of ammo, one gang member throws a stick of dynamite but is stopped by a returning Jacques.

Jacques and Angel begin to fight and just when Jacques is about to knock Angel out, Henry convinces him that it should be Martin who should fight Angel. Martin beats Angel and kicks him while he is on the ground repeatedly until he is unconscious. Jacques tells Martin he did what he had to.

== Cast ==
- Olivier Gruner as Jacques Montaigne
- Theresa Saldana as Maria Ordonez
- Frank Aragon as Martin Ordonez
- Peter Kwong as Henry
- Mike Moroff as Frank
- Tony Valentino as Angel
- Lupe Amador as Grandma Ordonez
- Daniel Villareal as Jesus
- Jim Jaimes as Chuy
- Robin Harlan as Sara
- Gregory Cruz as Stoner
- Claudine Penedo as Angel's Driver
- Mark Dacascos as Stoner's Driver
- Bruce Locke as Mr Park
- William Bassett as Graduate Dean
- Stuart Quan as Henry's Blackbelt

== Production ==
The film's budget was under $3 million.

== Release ==
The film opened February 23, 1990 on 59 screens in Los Angeles and San Diego. Its first weekend of theatrical release was marked by a gang brawl at a drive-in theater in Westminster, California. It expanded to New York, Miami and Detroit on April 13, 1990.

== Reception ==
The reception from critics was mixed.
