= A.P.E.X. =

- Theatrical release poster
- Directed by: Phillip J. Roth
- Written by: Phillip J. Roth; Ron Schmidt
- Produced by: Jeffery Beach; Gary Jude Burkart; Talaat Captan; Gary LoConti
- Starring: Richard Keats; Mitchell Cox; Lisa Ann Russell; Marcus Aurelius
- Cinematography: Mark W. Gray
- Edited by: Daniel Lawrence
- Music by: Jim Goodwin
- Distributed by: Green Communications
- Release date: 1994
- Running time: 98 minutes
- Country: United States
- Language: English
- Budget: $6 million
- Box office: $49,601 (US/Canada)

A.P.E.X. is a 1994 science fiction action film directed by Phillip J. Roth and starring Richard Keat, Mitchell Cox, Lisa Ann Russell, and Marcus Aurelius. The plot concerns a group of scientists who explore the past using robotic probes known as the A.P.E.X. or "Advanced Prototype Exploration units".

== Plot ==
In 2073, Nicholas Sinclair is a scientist on a time travel project. An accident introduces a deadly virus to 1973, which activates the project's automatic countermeasures. Attack robots are sent to the past in an effort to eliminate the virus carriers. They fail, and Sinclair returns to 2073 to find the Earth in ruins, ravaged by both the virus and a constant stream of attack robots. Sinclair returns to the project lab that is now in shambles and uses the time travel equipment there to prevent the original cause of the accident.

== Cast ==
- Richard Keats as Nicholas Sinclair
- Mitchell Cox as Shepherd
- Lisa Ann Russell as Natasha Sinclair
- Marcus Aurelius as Taylor
- Adam Lawson as Rasheed
- David Jean Thomas as Dr. Elgin
- Brian Richard Peck as Desert Rat
- Anna B. Choi as Mishima
- Kristin Norton as Johnson
- Jay Irwin as Gunney
- Robert Tossberg as 1973 Father
- Kathleen Randazzo as 1973 Mother (as Kathy Lambert)
- Kareem H. Captan as Joey
- Merle Nicks as Old Man
- Natasha Roth as Desert Child

== Reception ==
A.P.E.X. was nominated for Best Film in the International Fantasy Film Award at the 1994 Fantasporto international film festival in Porto, Portugal. The film was featured in Brazil on the Cine Trash program on Bandeirantes TV, and is also featured on the B-movie website Badmovies.org where it is determined to have 2 Slimes (not the worst rating; two better than the worst of the worst, but still acknowledged as a bad film).

== See also ==
- Landmaster
