= Cool Blue =

- American VHS box art
- Directed by: Mark Mullin; Richard Shepard
- Written by: Mark Mullin; Richard Shepard
- Starring: Woody Harrelson; Hank Azaria; Ely Pouget; Sean Penn
- Edited by: Robin Katz
- Release dates: September 1989 (Greece); February 27, 1990 (United States)
- Running time: 90 minutes
- Country: United States
- Language: English

Cool Blue is a 1989 American romantic comedy film directed by Mark Mullin and Richard Shepard, and stars Woody Harrelson, Hank Azaria, Ely Pouget and Sean Penn.

== Plot ==
An aspiring painter named Dustin Pennett is on a search for love, sex, and inspiration when he meets a woman named Christiane at an art gallery. They spend the night together at her apartment, but the next morning she has disappeared, leaving Dustin heartbroken. He visits her family home in Southern California and learns from her younger sister that Christiane ran away at a young age after having an abortion, also finding out that "Christiane's" apartment was actually a display room she had broken them into.

Dustin returns home to Los Angeles and, after confiding in Phil, a plumber who has seen Dustin at his local pub, about his issues with Christiane, finds success painting portraits of her from memory, idealizing her as his true love. Dustin's best friend, a struggling writer named Buzz, envies his friend's newfound success. After Dustin easily beds Cathy, a woman Buzz has been chasing for two years, Buzz angrily shouts at Dustin and threatens him with a pool cue during a drunken argument.

Christiane returns to the gallery and finds Dustin's paintings of her, including a nude one which she slashes. She then breaks into his apartment and throws blue paint on him. Christiane says that they had a meaningless encounter and complains that the paintings are interfering with her life. Dustin responds that he painted them because their night together meant something to him and he wants to get to know her as a person.

After making up with Buzz, Dustin ditches a show planned for him in New York by his manager Paul in order to meet Christiane at the Los Angeles County Museum of Art. The film ends with a shot of Dustin and Christiane embracing.

== Cast ==
- Woody Harrelson as Dustin Pennett
- Hank Azaria as "Buzz"
- Ely Pouget as Christiane
- Paul Lussier as Paul
- Phillip Brock as Bruce
- Judie Aronson as Cathy
- Christopher McDonald as Peter Sin
- Gloria LeRoy as Ida
- Karen Haber as Sascha
- Jonathan Chapin as Les
- Cindy Guyer as Girl In Gallery
- Elisabeth Mullin as Rebecca
- Allison Robinson as Cindy
- Brian Ruf as The Bartender
- Nicoletta Munroe as Anna
- John Diehl as Clayton
- Julie Friedman
- Sean Penn as Phil, The Plumber (uncredited)

== Home media ==
Filmed in mid-1988 in Los Angeles, Cool Blue was picked up for domestic distribution by RCA-Columbia and Epic Home Video in late 1989. It was first released in the US on February 27, 1990, on pay-per-view and cable TV. On March 7, it was released in the US on VHS and LaserDisc, however it was first released in Greece on VHS in September 1989. In 1991, the film was released on VHS in Australia and the UK.

It was not released on DVD until March 13, 2012, when MGM Home Entertainment released a remastered widescreen version as part of their Limited Edition Collection, with a trailer as the only special feature.
