= Adrienne Wilkinson =

American actress

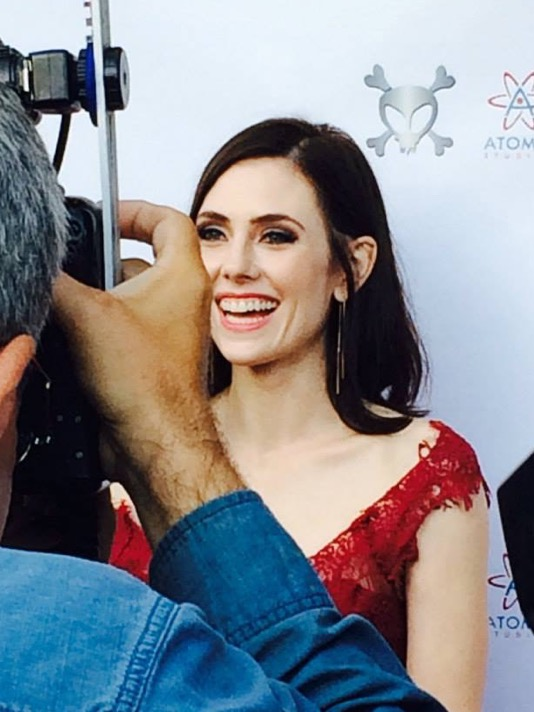
- Wilkinson at the Star Trek: Renegades premiere
- Occupation: Actress
- Years active: 1996–present
- Website: Official website

Adrienne Wilkinson is an American actress. She is known for playing Eve, the daughter of Xena in the TV series Xena: Warrior Princess in the fifth and sixth seasons. She has appeared in numerous television series such as Angel, Charmed, ER, and Venice: The Series, and played Captain Lexxa Singh in Star Trek: Renegades.

Wilkinson is also a voice actor who has appeared in numerous video games. She was the voice and model for Maris Brood in Star Wars: The Force Unleashed, Mina Tang in Alpha Protocol, and has also appeared in Star Wars: The Old Republic, The Secret World, and The Evil Within. She also voiced Daughter, the personification of the Light side of the Force in Star Wars: The Clone Wars. Archive audio of her performance as Daughter was used in an episode of Star Wars Rebels.

She is the creator of From the Mouths of Babes, an online interview series that collects impromptu interviews that address Love, Life, and Self.

== Biography ==
Raised mainly in Missouri and having taken dance classes since she was a small child, her 'professional debut' came as a dancing popcorn for a live 50's music show when she was 10.

== Career ==
Adrienne Wilkinson is best known for her role of Livia/Eve, the sometimes-warrior-sometimes-saint daughter of Xena on Xena: Warrior Princess. She started on television in an episode of Sweet Valley High in 1996, and moved on to Saved By The Bell: The New Class, Chicken Soup for the Soul and in 2001 she had several guest appearances on Undressed. In 2002 she starred as Nikki on the US version of As If. In 2003 she had a guest spot on Angel as a cheeky flapper from the 1920s, and as Linda Browning in an episode of Days of Our Lives. In 2005 she had guest appearances on Charmed as Phoebe Halliwell's first disguise of the season, Eyes and was a temporary love interest of Dr. Ray Barnett on ER, and Paisley Parker on Goodnight Burbank. She is a series regular on Venice: The Series playing Adrienne, who appears in seasons 2–4.

Her film career includes Lakeshore Drive, (written and directed by Michael Grais and starring Wilkinson and Peter Dobson), Pomegranate, and she was the female lead in Interceptor Force 2 (AKA: Alpha Force), Missy Blue in The American Failure, and Nancy in Raze. Wilkinson's producer credits include the films Perfection and Seconds, which showcases a woman's struggles with depression and self-injury.

In 2008, she starred in the short film Reflections, directed by Barry Caldwell. She received two acting awards for her performance, and an additional two nominations.

Wilkinson is sought after for her voice over work which includes more than 50 characters in several videogames, animated videos and commercials. She also plays the part of Maris Brood, the female Jedi in Star Wars: The Force Unleashed. She also provided the acting for the physical character as well, as the video game used the most technologically advanced motion capture available to capture her likeness and performance. Wilkinson had a guest role as the voice of Daughter, the personification of the Light side of the Force, on the animated Star Wars: The Clone Wars. Recordings of Wilkinson's vocal performance as Daughter was later used in an episode of the TV series Star Wars Rebels. She plays Mina Tang in the Alpha Protocol video game, voiced several characters, including Gianna, in Star Wars: The Old Republic, and was the voice of Sarah in the massively multiplayer online game The Secret World: The Black Signal.

Her most recent work includes the pilot for the dramatic series Frequency, the pilot for Bump & Grind, the film Burning Dog, and the feature-length pilot, Star Trek: Renegades, where she plays Captain Lexxa Singh, a descendant of Khan Noonien Singh.

Wilkinson is also known for her charity works which includes a focus on literacy programs, animal welfare and children. Her website hosts an annual charity auction each year which helps to support families dealing with medical expenses. She was also one of many celebrities photographed for the TJ Scott book In the Tub with proceeds going to breast cancer research at UCLA's Jonsson cancer center.

== From the Mouths of Babes ==
In 2011, Wilkinson created From The Mouths of Babes, an online interview series that collects impromptu interviews that address Love, Life, and Self. The project launched on YouTube on May 15, 2012, under the user ID mouthsofbabesnet.

From the Mouths of Babes began to release compilation episodes in September 2013, starting with "Xena on Love." The series had three seasons which ran from 2013 to 2019.

== Filmography ==
=== Film ===
Year	Title	Role	Notes
1996	Return	Tara / Girl	Short
2005	Pomegranate	Commercial Actress	
2006	Yesterday's Dream	Emily	Short
2006	WalkAway	Mystery Woman	Short
2006	Expectation	The Girl Next Door	Short
2006	Lakeshore Drive	Sally Stein	Short
2008	Reflections	Carol Anderson	Short
2012	The American Failure	Missy Blue	Short
2013	Raze	Nancy	
2014	Andromeda	Andromeda	
2015	Dia de Los Muertos	Dahlia	Short
2016	The Life and Death of Julian Finn	Victoria Finn (voice)	
2017	Burning Dog	Julie	
2017	Nobility	Lieutenant Ara Eris	
2017	Seedless	Alexis	Short
2018	Landfill	Judy Birch	
2020	Dreamcatcher	Josephine Tully	
2024	The Icarus Maneuver	Commander Corax	Short

=== Television ===
Year	Title	Role	Notes
1996	Sweet Valley High	Tara	"The Tooth Hurts, Doesn't It?"
1997	Saved by the Bell: The New Class	Sonya	"Suddenly Ryan"
2000	Chicken Soup for the Soul	Vikkie	"The Right Thing"
2000–2001	Xena: Warrior Princess	Eve	Recurring role (seasons 5–6)
2001	Undressed	Lois	Main role (season 5)
2002	As If	Nikki	Main role
2002	Interceptor Force 2	Dawn DeSilvia	TV film
2003	Angel	Flapper	"Orpheus"
2003	Days of Our Lives	Linda Browning	1 episode
2005	Eyes	Melody	"Wings"
2005	ER	Jessica	"The Show Must Go On"
2005	Charmed	Phoebe #2	"Still Charmed and Kicking"
2006	Going Up!	Mary	TV short
2008	This Can't Be My Life	Monica	"The Pink Pages"
2010	Freshmen	Floozy (voice)	TV film
2010–2014	Venice: The Series	Adrienne	Web series
2011	Star Wars: The Clone Wars	The Daughter (voice)	"Overlords", "Altar of Mortis"
2011	Goodnight Burbank	Paisley Parker	Main role (6 episodes)
2014	Broken Things	Annie Collier	TV film
2014	Fame Game	Wendy Thom	"Pilot"
2014	Partners	Heather Garrett	"The Curious Case of Benjamin Butt-Ugly"
2015	About a Boy	Tammy Idalis	"About a Boy Becoming a Man"
2014–2015	Pretty the Series	Lily Devonshire	Recurring role
2014–2018	Suspense	Various	TV series
2015	Eff'd	Tia	TV film
2015	Star Trek Continues	Edith Keeler	"The White Iris"
2015	Hot Girl Walks By	The Hot Girl/Nurse	"Visitors in a Hospital"
2015	Club 5150	Dr. Pope	TV series
2016	Sidetracked	Jess	TV series
2017	Monster School Animation	Andrea Satin (voice)	"Welcome to Monster School"
2017	Star Trek: Renegades	Capt. Lexxa Singh	Regular role
2018	Star Wars Rebels	The Daughter (voice)	"Wolves and a Door", "A World Between Worlds"
2023-2025	We Have Many Skills	Eve	Lead, web series

=== Voice work ===
- 2019 Reads for Joan Collins in the audio book for These Are The Voyages - Star Trek: The Original Series, Season One.
- Narrator of the audio book for The Icarus Maneuver.

=== Video games ===
Year	Title	Role	Consoles	Source
2003	Kill.switch	Duchess	PS2, Xbox, PC	
2004	Scooby-Doo 2: Monsters Unleashed	Daphne Blake		
2004	EverQuest II	Danielle Clothespinner / Andrea Dovesong / Breeza Harmet	MMO	
2005	Dead to Rights II	Ruby	PS2, PC, Xbox	
2005	Neopets: The Darkest Faerie	Malice	PS, PS2	
2006	Saints Row	Samantha	Xbox 360	
2006	The Sopranos: Road to Respect	Multiple Characters	PS2	
2007	Bratz 4 Real	Meredith	PC, Nintendo DS	
2008	Command & Conquer 3: Kane's Wrath	Zone Raider	PC, Xbox 360	
2008	Star Wars: The Force Unleashed	Maris Brood	PS2, PS3, Wii, Xbox 360, PC	
2008	Saints Row 2	Sorority Girl / Stewardess / Hippy / Stripper	PC, PS3, Xbox 360	
2010	Star Wars: The Force Unleashed II	Maris Brood	Maris appears in the Wii version	
2010	The 3rd Birthday	News Anchor		
2010	Alpha Protocol	Mina Tang	PC, PS3, Xbox 360	
2011	Star Wars: The Old Republic	Gianna	MMO	
2013	The Secret World: The Black Signal	Sarah	MMO	
2014	The Evil Within	Laura (monster)	PC, PS3, PS4, Xbox 360, Xbox One	
2015	Sons of Anarchy: The Prospect	Bea	iPad 4, iPad Air/iPad Air 2, iPad Mini Retina/Retina 2, iPhone 5/5c/5s/6/6	
2015	Rise of the Tomb Raider	Additional Voices	PC, PS4, Xbox 360, Xbox One	
2016	World of Final Fantasy	Shiva	PS4, PSVita	
2019	Epic Seven	Coli / Judith / Azalea	Google Play, App Store	
2020	Star Trek Online	LouAnn Wilkens	PC, PS4, Xbox One	
2024	Final Fantasy VII Rebirth	multiple voices (English)	PS5	
2027	Tomb Raider Legacy of Atlantis	Natla (Voice and Mo-Cap)	PS5, Xbox Series X/S, Nintendo Switch 2	

== Awards and nominations ==
Awards and nominations
Year	Award	Category	Film	Result
2008	Big Easy Shorts Festival	Best Actress	Reflections	Won
2008	Beverly Hills Shorts Festival	Best Actress	Reflections	Won
2008	Long Island International Film Expo	Best Actress	Reflections	Honorable Mention
2008	Action on Film Festival	Best Actress	Reflections	Nominated
