= Darkdrive =

- Directed by: Phillip J. Roth
- Written by: Alec Carlin
- Starring: Ken Olandt; Claire Stansfield; Julie Benz
- Distributed by: Leo Home Video
- Release date: November 1997 (Canada)
- Running time: 88 minutes
- Country: United States
- Language: English

Darkdrive is a science fiction movie which premiered in Canada in November 1997 and went straight to DVD in the USA. It stars Ken Olandt and Julie Benz. Darkdrive was the first DVD ever released in United Kingdom.

The movie is known for a small moment that was used in the opening sequence for South Park's fourth and fifth seasons, starting with the fourth season episode "Fourth Grade".

== Plot ==
In the near future, a new law sends criminals to a virtual reality prison built by Zircon, a shadowy corporation based in Seattle. Steven Falcon, the system's designer, realizes the dangers of the program being overloaded and also of hackers who try to break in to steal files which inadvertently allows prisoners a possible method of escape. When Falcon threatens to quit the operation he becomes marked for death by his employers who force him to enter the system to find the source of the danger of the system crashing.

== Cast ==
- Ken Olandt as Steven Falcon
- Claire Stansfield as R.J. Tilda
- Julie Benz as Julie Falcon
- Gian Carlo Scandiuzzi as Matthew Stolopin
- Brian Faker as Ben
- Brian Finney as Bill
- Marcus Aurelius as Dayton
- Tony Doupe as Thackery
- William Hall, Jr. as the Doorman at Zeak's
