= Total Reality =

- Directed by: Phillip J. Roth
- Written by: Phillip J. Roth
- Produced by: Christian McIntire; Ken Olandt; Phillip J. Roth; Elizabeth Weintraub
- Starring: David Bradley; Ely Pouget; Thomas Kretschmann; Misa Koprova; Brian Faker; Melik Malkasian; Geof Prysirr; Michael Mendelson; Anna Nicholas; Marcus Aurelius; Bob Morrisey; Mark McClure; Patsy Pease; Eddi Wilde; Ken Olandt; Mark Angelo
- Cinematography: Andrés Garretón
- Edited by: Christian McIntire
- Music by: Jim Goodwin
- Release date: April 4, 1997
- Running time: 1h 40min.
- Country: United States
- Language: English

Total Reality is a 1997 American science-fiction action film directed by Phillip J. Roth. The musical score was composed by Jim Goodwin. The film stars David Bradley, Ely Pouget, Thomas Kretschmann, Anna Nicholas, Marcus Aurelius, and Patsy Pease.

== Plot ==
In 2107 Earth is controlled by a military-political party known as the Bridgists. A galaxy-wide rebellion against the Bridgists' rule results in the destruction of all life on Earth. Soon, the rebellion is on the brink of defeat by the Bridgists. The rebels make a final stand near Proximia 2 in the Alpha Centauri star system. The Bridgists, win a starship battle with the rebels, but the rebel Commander Tunis and Colonel Norris escape in a time traveling shuttle which takes them back to Earth in 1998. The Bridgists destroy the rebel ship, even though it is filled with civilians. Bridgist lieutenant Anthony Rand tries to stop the destruction of the rebel ship, but instead ends up killing his own commander. He is arrested and sent to military prison.

Rand and 3 other prisoners, Wingate, Frankel, and Uriah, are recruited to go back in time to 1998 and kill Tunis. They have 48 hours to complete their mission, otherwise their bio-implants will self-destruct, killing them all.

Rand and the others successfully land in America in 1998. Rand's group steals a car and Uriah is able to drive it. Cathy Easton, a businesswoman from 1998, breaks into her ex-husband's house and finds Tunis and Norris there. Rand's group reaches the house and starts shooting at Tunis. Uriah is killed and Tunis escapes. Tunis then blows up the house, but Rand manages to rescue Cathy. FBI agents arrive at the house to investigate the explosion. Finding Uriah's body, the agents try to conduct a postmortem, but Uriah's bio-implant blows up.

Rand's group returns to Cathy's house, where she tells Rand that she was married to a John Bridges; Rand knows he started the Bridgist movement through a book on political idealism he wrote. Rand surmises that is why Tunis has travelled back to 1998. The police arrive, so Rand blows up the house and they all escape in the explosion.

Wingate receives a signal from Tunis and Norris's bio-trackers from inside an old warehouse. Frankel finds the bio-trackers in a wooden chest as Tunis and Norris have managed to remove them. Unfortunately, as soon as Frankel opens the chest, they self-destruct, killing him.

John Bridges is nearly killed in an explosion, and Cathy becomes the main suspect. The police turn up, and Rand and Wingate help Cathy escape. Rand sends Wingate back to their ship, and goes with Cathy to catch Tunis.

Congressman Jerry meets up with John Bridges to talk about his book. Jerry is running for Senate next year and he needs additional support. Jerry blackmails John about his tax debts and money laundering to get his support.

Rand and Cathy go and visit John Bridges, as Rand knows that Tunis may be near. They take out the security guards and confront John. Rand is about to kill John, but Cathy persuades him not to. Instead, they go in search of Congressman Jerry.

However, Tunis finds Jerry first and kidnaps him. Tunis plans to replicate himself into the image of Jerry, so he can run for president. Rand and Cathy find Tunis, and they have a gunfight. Jerry is killed, potentially changing the future forever, and Tunis manages to escape taking Cathy as a hostage. Rand finds them on a bridge, and kills Tunis. Cathy escapes by jumping over the side of the bridge into the river and Rand follows. Meanwhile, Wingate gets back to the ship and takes off, leaving Rand stuck in 1998.

Rand's bio-implant blows up as his 48-hour mission time has come to an end. Cathy is arrested by the FBI and tries to explain that she is innocent and that Rand and Tunis came from the future. They believe her and all charges are dropped.

Wingate returns to the future, but all the space stations have disappeared. Her ship is picked up by another large space cruiser which has come from Earth. In this new reality, there has been no war and Earth was never destroyed.

== Cast ==
- David Bradley as Anthony Rand, a Bridgist lieutenant
- Ely Pouget as Cathy Easton, a businesswoman and ex-wife of John Bridges from 1998
- Thomas Kretschmann as Commander Tunis, a rebel commander
- Misa Koprova as Wingate, a rebel prisoner
- Brian Faker as Frankel, a rebel prisoner
- Melik Malkasian as Uriah, a rebel prisoner
- Geof Prysirr as Congressman Jerry as the next president of the United States
- Michael Mendelson as John Bridges, Cathy's ex-husband and author of the political idealist books
- Anna Nicholas as Agent Wesson, an FBI agent from 1998
- Marcus Aurelius as Agent Smith, an FBI agent from 1998
- Bob Morrisey as Major Prackel
- Mark McClure as Dr. Gordon
- Patsy Pease as Leader
- Barbara Lusch as Marla
- Ken Olandt as Commander Swift
- Eddi Wilde as Colonel Norris, a Brigist Colonel
- Mark Angelo as a guard
