= W.A.K.O. World Championships 1985 (Budapest) =

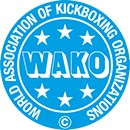
- The poster for W.A.K.O. World Championships 1985 (Budapest)
- Promotion: W.A.K.O.
- Date: November 2, 1985
- City: Budapest, Hungary
- Attendance: 20,000

Event chronology
W.A.K.O. World Championships London 1985	W.A.K.O. World Championships 1985 (Budapest)	W.A.K.O. European Championships 1986

W.A.K.O. World Championships 1985 Budapest were the joint fifth world kickboxing championships hosted by the W.A.K.O. organization arranged by the Hungarian Sport Karate Union. The organization was under some strain at the time and had split into two separate factions due to politically differences, meaning there were two separate world championships being held on the same date - with an event in London also taking place. These political differences would, however, be resolved and the organization would come back together the following year. It was the first ever W.A.K.O. championships to be held in Eastern Europe.

The event was open to amateur men, and for the first time ever, women were allowed to compete (this was the same for the London event). The men had two categories, Full-Contact and Semi-Contact, while the women competed in Semi-Contact only. Unlike London there was no Musical Forms although there was an additional Semi-Contact team event. Some countries was allowed more than one competitor in certain weight categories in the men's and women's events due to limited numbers and some competitors in the men's events competed in more than one category. By the end of the championships, the top nation in terms of medals won was France, Great Britain were in second with Italy in third. The event was held in Budapest, Hungary on Saturday, 2 November 1985 in front of an estimated 20,000 spectators.

== Men's Full-Contact Kickboxing ==
As with the London event there were ten weight classes in Full-Contact although some of the division were slightly different at the heavier end of the spectrum - ranging from 54 kg/118.8 lbs to over 87 kg/+191.4 lbs. All bouts were fought under Full-Contact rules with more detail on the rules being provided at the W.A.K.O. website - although be aware that the rules may have changed slightly since 1985. One of the notable winners was Chiarrochi who had also won a gold at the 1983 world championships, while compatriot Olivier Gruner (who would later have a career as an actor in Hollywood) won silver in the 75 kg category. France was the top nation in Full-Contact by the end of the championships, winning three golds and four silvers.

=== Men's Full-Contact Kickboxing Medals Table ===
Event	Gold	Silver	Bronze
-54 kg	Farid Agueni (France)	Dahak (Algeria)	Rechsteiner (Switzerland) Balog (Hungary)
-57 kg	Kaidi (France)	Howard Brown (United Kingdom)	
-60 kg	Hawak (Hungary)	El Quandili (France)	Massimo Ulissi (Italy); Hartenberger (Austria)
-63.5 kg	Giorgio Perreca (Italy)	Michael Duhs (Austria)	Jasch (Hungary); Ghoose (Belgium)
-67 kg	Massimo Liberati (Italy)	Torre (France)	Berrar (Switzerland); Nachife (Morocco)
-71 kg	Norbert Fisch (Switzerland)	Olivier Gruner (France)	O'Loughlin (Republic of Ireland); Serafino Ferrari (Italy)
-75 kg	Frank Judes (France)	Nasser Nassiri (Iran)	Fernando Carvalho (Portugal); Dietmar (Austria)
-80 kg	Othmar Felsberger (Austria)	Zolt (West Germany)	Pino Bosco (Belgium); Dietmar (Austria)
-87 kg	Raj Kumar (Denmark)	Vasilikos Kirarisson (Greece)	Károly Halász (Hungary); Slobodon Sokota (Socialist Federal Republic of Yugoslavia)
+87 kg	Bruno Ciarrochi (France)	Bruno Campiglia (Italy)	Mihaloydis (Greece); Jumasz (Hungary)

== Semi-Contact Kickboxing ==
Semi-Contact differed from Full-Contact in that fights were won on points given due to technique, skill and speed, with physical force limited - more information on Semi-Contact can be found on the W.A.K.O. website, although the rules will have changed since 1985. In the men's division there were seven weight divisions ranging from 57 kg/125.4 lbs to over 84 kg/+184.8 lbs. By the end of the championships the top nation in men's Semi-Contact was Great Britain with two golds and one silver medal.

As with the London event, for the first time ever women were allowed to compete at a W.A.K.O. championships. The only category on offer was Semi-Contact with just two weight divisions; under 60 kg/132 lbs and over 60 kg/+132 lbs. The rules were similar to the men's - a full version can be found on the W.A.K.O. website although be aware that the rules will have changed somewhat since 1985. Due to the somewhat smaller number of nations competing some nations were allowed more than one competitor per weight division. By the end of the championships Hungary was the strongest nation in women's Semi-Contact, winning one gold, one silver and one bronze medal. There was also an additional team event of which Great Britain came away with gold.

=== Men's Semi-Contact Kickboxing Medals Table ===
Event	Gold	Silver	Bronze
-57 kg	Piotr Siegoczyński (Poland)	Gerhard Walde (Italy)	Ulrick (West Germany)
-63 kg	Massimo Galozzi (Scotland)	Baleche (France)	Bobby O'Neil (Republic of Ireland)
-69 kg	Gull Bresser (Norway)	Haas (West Germany)	Veres (Hungary)
-74 kg	Hans Hinz (West Germany)	Nasser Nassiri (Iran)	Bencic (Socialist Federal Republic of Yugoslavia)
-79 kg	Clive Parkinson (United Kingdom)	Zimmerman (West Germany)	Stelzl (Austria)
-84 kg	Kevin Brewerton (United Kingdom)	Harrer (West Germany)	Barnabas Katona (Hungary)
+84 kg	Laurent Dably (Ivory Coast)	Neville Wray (United Kingdom)	Szivak (Hungary)

=== Women's Semi-Contact Kickboxing Medals Table ===
Event	Gold	Silver	Bronze
-60 kg	Szepessi (Hungary)	Carmela Spata (Italy)	Kiss Beata (Hungary)
+60 kg	Bruno (France)	Ujfallidi (Hungary)	Heinz (West Germany)

=== Team's Semi-Contact Kickboxing Medals Table ===
Event	Gold	Silver	Bronze
Teams	Great Britain (United Kingdom)	Italy	Hungary; Austria

== Overall Medals Standing (Top 5) ==
Ranking	Country	Gold (gold)	Silver (silver)	Bronze (bronze)
1	France	3	6	0
2	(United Kingdom) Great Britain	3	2	0
3	Italy	2	4	2
4	Hungary	2	1	10
5	Austria	1	1	4

== See also ==
- List of WAKO Amateur World Championships
- List of WAKO Amateur European Championships
