= Locusts: The 8th Plague =

2005 film directed by Ian Gilmour

- Written by: D.R. Rosen
- Directed by: Ian Gilmour
- Starring: Dan Cortese; Julie Benz; David Keith
- Music by: Pierpaolo Tiano

Production
- Producers: Jeffery Beach; Phillip Roth
- Cinematography: Lorenzo Senatore
- Editors: William Daniels; John Quinn
- Running time: 88 minutes
- Production companies: Universal Pictures; UFO International Productions

Original release
- Network: Syfy
- Release: November 12, 2005

Locusts: The 8th Plague is a 2005 natural horror film directed by Ian Gilmour and starring Dan Cortese, Julie Benz and David Keith about a group of farmers and scientists that battle a swarm of flesh-eating locusts that have escaped from a secret genetics laboratory in Idaho.

== Plot ==
The film starts in a genetics laboratory 15 miles outside Prairie, Idaho. Inside the laboratory, Gary Wolf (David Keith) and Russ Snow (Jeff Fahey) have made a completely new species of locust that is genetically engineered to eat insects that destroy crops. In the main room in the crop dome, Russ releases the locusts into a crop field filled with insects for one minute, luring them back into the main holding pen using a strong pheromone lure. One of the main vents jams midway through the process and Gary sends one of the Silogen workers into the tunnel system. The worker finds that the vent is stuck in the open position and after scanning the holding pen, the locusts attack the worker and he is killed within a few seconds. The locusts then escape from the Silogen Research Facility through the open vent.

Meanwhile, on a small farm near Prairie, Colt Dunton (Dan Cortese) is producing a new kind of organic pesticide which he introduces to his friends, Hank Odem and his wife Agatha. Colt leaves the farm to check his pesticide and Hank starts his husker blade to harvest the corn. The blade suddenly jams, Hank gets out to investigate and discovers the remains of a bull that has been almost completely eaten. He radios Agatha and tells her about the bull. Agatha hears something in the corn and discovers the remains of her son, Mike. Grief-stricken, she starts to panic. Hank heads towards his combine and discovers that it is covered in locusts which attack and kill him. Agatha runs through the field and is also attacked and killed by the locusts. Colt arrives on the scene and finds the dead body of a locust. He runs to the medical hospital where his girlfriend, Vicky (Julie Benz), works as a veterinarian. Vicky and Colt then hear reports of cows and farm animals dying in the same way as the bull on Hank's farm. Vicky and Colt examine the remains of a dead cow and find a locust in it.

Meanwhile, in Prairie, a family having a picnic is attacked by the locusts and their son is the only survivor. A State Trooper (Atanas Srebrev) takes him to a hospital. Colt examines a dead locust that was on the car that the Trooper used to bring in the child and discovers that it is a juvenile. Vicky tries to tell him that the locusts were all drones but the examination proves that the locusts are breeding.

Colt, Vicky, USDA Agent Greg Ballard (Kirk Woller) and a group of exterminators find the locusts' nest and spray pesticides in an attempt to kill the larvae and locusts. This irritates the locusts and they attack the group. Colt, Vicky and Greg are the only survivors. This leads Colt to wonder why they were not attacked. Back at the headquarters of the USDA, Greg decides that the only option they have is to spray the locusts with UD-66, the most dangerous chemical weapon on the planet. Vicky tells Greg to issue the order despite Colt telling her that if they spray it, plants will not grow back for 10 years.

Meanwhile, the swarm of locusts attacks an amusement park off the major highway. Many people at the amusement park are eaten alive by the locusts. Back at the laboratory, Colt (who had taken sample larvae from the nest) examines the locust larva to try to figure out why they did not attack Vicky and him; he then tries on some live adult locusts and discovers that chemical pesticides attract them. Greg then gathers a large amount of livestock in a field and the locusts arrive. He orders a helicopter to drop the pesticide which had been changed to UD-45. Despite Colt trying to get to the field to tell Greg and Vicky what he has discovered, the helicopter drops the pesticide and the pilots are attacked by the swarm, destroying the helicopter. Colt then decides to use the organic pesticide he developed on the locust swarm which has now attacked the town of Prairie and during the attack Gary who was trying to flee is killed by the locusts. Colt flies a plane over the city and drops the pesticide and the swarm of locusts dies instantly. But before they can celebrate, two larger swarms appear over the city and this time, Vicky's father, Russ, decides to lure the locusts into the crop dome using the pheromone lure. The pheromone works and the locusts fly into the crop dome. Russ then sacrifices his life by going into the dome and programming it to self-destruct. The crop dome explodes, killing all of the locusts, but there it is one more truck with possibly with hundreds of hungry locusts in the rear compartment headed towards another crop dome. The boxes read: Live Specimens.

== Cast ==
- Dan Cortese as Colt Dunton
- Julie Benz as Dr. Vicky Snow
- David Keith as Gary Wolf
- Jeff Fahey as Russ Snow
- Kirk B.R. Woller as USDA Agent Greg Ballard
- Atanas Srebrev as Trooper Henderson
- Naum Shopov as Kyle
- Hristo Mitzkov as Bill
- Marianna Stanicheva as Gina
- Jeff Rank as Hank Odem
- Paraskeva Djukelova as Agatha Odem
- Yulian Vergov as ER Doctor
- Natasha Roth as Natty
- Paul Joshua Ruben as Dad
- Ryan Spike Dauner as Tech #1
- Vlado Mihailov as Tech #2
- Vladimir Kolev as Silogen Guard
- Zahari Baharov as Street Preacher
- Harry Anichkin as National Guard Commander
- Niki Iliev as National Guardsman
- Velislav Pavlov as Pilot
- Maria Stancheva as The Receptionist
- Jim Clark as Reporter
- Ivo Simeonov as Duct Tech
- Mark Vatkins as Alex Grimes

== Reception ==
A review states, "Unlike CBS’s own locusts run amok flick from earlier this year, (...) promises you killer locusts and delivers just that quite frequently and quite bloody too."
