= Amy Bailey (actress) =

American actress (born 1975)

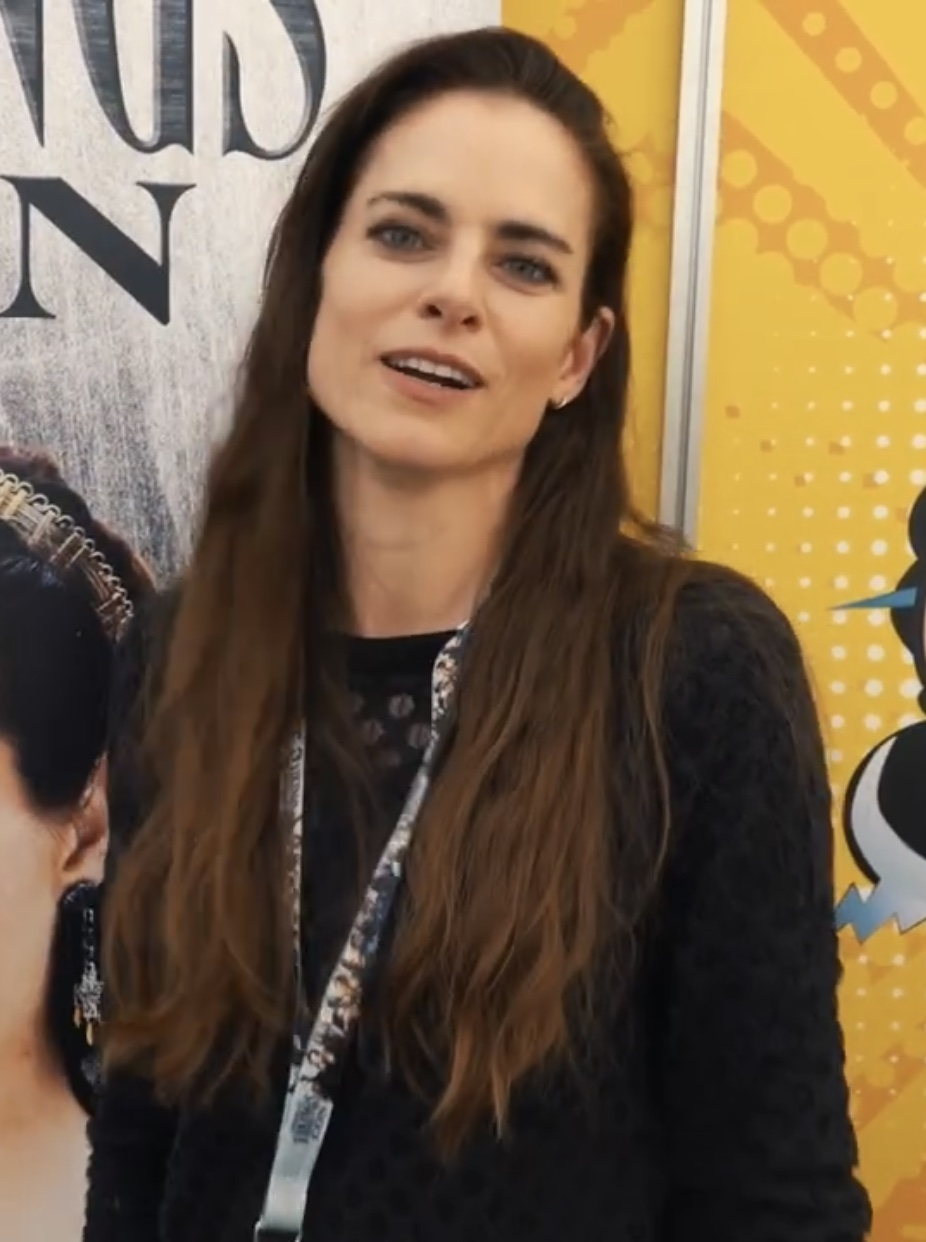
- Amy Bailey in 2022
- Born: October 24, 1975 (age 50); Texas, U.S.
- Occupation: Actress
- Years active: 2009–present

Amy Bailey (born October 24, 1975) is an American actress best known for her portrayal as Queen Kwenthrith on the television series Vikings. Other shows she has appeared on include Dominion and (most recently) The Chosen.

== Early life ==
Bailey was born on October 24, 1975, in Texas, and grew up in Rockport, Corpus Christi and South Padre Island.

== Filmography ==
=== Acting credits ===
==== Film ====
Year	Title	Role	Notes
2009	Nine	Dancer	
2009	The Dancers of 'Nine'	Dancer	Short
2010	Alice in Wonderland	Hatteress (uncredited)	
2011	Girl Walks into a Bar	Dancer	
2012	Boogeyman	Rebecca	TV movie
2013	Taken: The Search for Sophie Parker	Nadia	TV movie
2013	Supercollider	Natalie Susskind	
2014	Need for Speed Dating	Polly	Short
2015	Is This Thing On?	Madge	Short
2020	The Fosse Forest Ballet	Caroline Shabitski	TV movie
2020	Knuckledust	Chrissy	
2021	Swallow Your Dreams	Olivia	Short

==== Television series ====
Year	Title	Role	Notes
2013	Dark Matters: Twisted But True	Nadia	TV movie
2010	I Shouldn't Be Alive	Gina Allen	Episode: "Date from Hell"
2013	Dark Matters: Twisted But True	Nadia	TV movie
2014	Dominion	Clementine	4 episodes
2014-2016	Vikings	Princess / Queen Kwenthrith	13 episodes
2017	Major Crimes	Karina Volsky	Episode: "Dead Drop"
2022-present	The Chosen	Joanna	5 episodes

==== Video games ====
Year	Title	Role	Notes
2019	Blood & Truth	Amanda 'Kayla' Kincaide	
