= Taken: The Search for Sophie Parker =

2013 television film directed by Don Michael Paul

- Screenplay by: Ellis Black; Rafael Jordan
- Directed by: Don Michael Paul
- Starring: Julie Benz; Amy Bailey; Jeffrey Meek; Naomi Battrick; Jemma Dallender
- Music by: Frederik Wiedmann
- Country of origin: United States
- Original language: English

Production
- Executive producers: Cherise Honey; Tim Mudd
- Producers: Jeffery Beach; Phillip Roth
- Cinematography: Alexander Krumov
- Editor: Cameron Hallenbeck
- Running time: 85 minutes
- Production companies: Dunulf Productions; Flee Productions

Original release
- Network: Lifetime
- Release: September 21, 2013

Taken: The Search for Sophie Parker is a 2013 American made-for-television film directed by Don Michael Paul and stars Julie Benz, Amy Bailey and Naomi Battrick. The film borrowed significantly from Taken and Taken 2. It premiered on September 21, 2013, on Lifetime.

== Premise ==
After her daughter is abducted in Russia, an NYPD detective goes out to find and save her from the kidnappers.

== Cast ==
- Julie Benz as Lt. Stevie Parker
- Amy Bailey as Nadia Petrova
- Jeffrey Meek as Jimmy Devlin
- Naomi Battrick as Sophie Parker
- Jemma Dallender as Janie Hillman
- Andrew Byron as Mikhail Semyonov
- Matvey Borushko as Bobby
- Valentin Ganev as Chief Mirov
- Alastair Mackenzie as Ambassador Hillman
- Velislav Pavlov as Ramazin Sultanov / Mr. Red
- Marina Kiskinova as French Girl
- Elena Boeva as U.S. Envoy
- Vladimir Kolev as Russian Cop
- Vlado Mihailov as Russian Hacker
- Yordanko Bojankov as Bouncer # 1
- Emilia Klayn as CNN Anchorwoman
- Raicho Vasilev as Bouncer # 2
- Atanas Srebrev as FBI Agent
- Tim Mudd as Prince Umberto
- Asdis Run as Princess Maria Umberto
- Kalina Stoimenova as Kidnapped Girl
