= Ken Olandt =

American actor

- Born: Kenneth Andrew Olandt; April 22, 1958 (age 68); Richmond, California, U.S.
- Occupations: Actor; producer; executive producer
- Years active: 1983–present

Kenneth Andrew Olandt (born April 22, 1958) is an American actor, producer, executive producer and businessman. He was born in Richmond, California, to Robert and Beverly Olandt.

Ken Olandt is best known for his lead starring role as Detective Zachary Stone in the syndicated series, Super Force (1990–1992, 48 episodes). He played male stripper Larry Kazamias in the comedy film Summer School. He appeared in the 1993 horror film, Leprechaun, and had a recurring role as "Dooley" in the second season of Riptide (1984). He guest-starred as Lydia's innocent alien brother Nigel, in a 1985 episode of V. He made guest appearances on such shows as Supercarrier, Hotel, Rags to Riches, The Young and the Restless, 21 Jump Street, Highway to Heaven, Matt Houston, The Fall Guy, The A-Team, Pacific Blue, JAG, Murder, She Wrote, and Star Trek: The Next Generation.

Due to his commitment with Unified Film Organization, which he co-founded, Olandt suspended his acting career to focus on producing, finance, and foreign licensing. The company produced three movies a year and eventually was sold in 2000 to a publicly-held German distribution company. The sale took the company to Bulgaria, at which point Olandt sold his operation.

== Filmography ==
Year	Title	Role	Director	Notes
1983	Matt Houston	Scottie	James L. Conway	TV series (1 Episode: "Butterfly")
1984	Summer	Bobby Wilson	Allan Arkush	TV movie
1984	Highway to Heaven	Deke Larson Jr.	Michael Landon	TV series (2 episodes)
1984	The Impostor	Snyder	Michael Pressman	TV movie
1984	Hotel	Eugene	Joseph B. Wallenstein	TV series (1 Episode: "Lifelines")
1984-85	Riptide	Kirk Dooley	Several directors	TV series (10 episodes)
1985	The Fall Guy	Jack Castin	Ted Lange	TV series (1 Episode: "Spring Break")
1985	V	Nigel	Cliff Bole	TV series (1 Episode: "The Secret Underground")
1985	Finder of Lost Loves	Jake Turner	Don Chaffey	TV series (1 Episode: "Broken Promises")
1985	The Love Boat	Don Phillips	Richard Kinon	TV series (2 episodes)
1985	The A-Team	Kid Harmon	Sidney Hayers	TV series (1 Episode: "Blood, Sweat, and Cheers")
1986	New Love, American Style	Doctor		TV series (1 Episode: "Love and the F.M. Doctor")
1986	Airwolf	Cecil Carnes Jr.	Vincent McEveety	TV series (1 Episode: "Wildfire")
1986	April Fool's Day	Rob	Fred Walton	
1986	The New Gidget	Ronnie	Robert Chenault	TV series (1 Episode: "Windsurfing Lesson")
1986	Simon & Simon	Jim Dacody / Billy Whicksam	Vincent McEveety (2)	TV series (2 episodes)
1987	Summer School	Larry Kazamias	Carl Reiner	
1987	Rags to Riches	Sean Howland	Bruce Seth Green	TV series (1 Episode: "Once in a Lifeguard")
1987	Gunsmoke: Return to Dodge	Lieutenant Dexter	Vincent McEveety (3)	TV movie
1987	The Law & Harry McGraw	Woody		TV series (1 Episode: "Yankee Boodle Dandy")
1987	Hotel	Tony Chapman	Jerome Courtland	TV series (1 Episode: "Fatal Attraction")
1988	Supercarrier	Lieutenant Jack 'Sierra' DePalma	Several directors	TV series (8 episodes)
1989	Knight & Daye	Brad	Jeffrey Ganz	TV series (1 Episode: "New York! New York?")
1989	21 Jump Street	Evan Roberts	Daniel Attias	TV series (1 Episode: "Stand by Your Man")
1990	Murder, She Wrote	Kevin Tarkington	John Llewellyn Moxey	TV series (1 Episode: "The Fixer-Upper")
1990	Laker Girls	Rick	Bruce Seth Green (2)	TV movie
1990	Super Force	Detective Zachary Stone	Richard Compton	TV movie
1991	Soldier's Fortune	Randy	Arthur N. Mele	
1990-92	Super Force	Detective Zachary Stone	Several directors	TV series (48 episodes)
1993	Leprechaun	Nathan Murphy	Mark Jones	
1993	Doogie Howser, M.D.	Dr. Tom Shepherd	David Carson	TV series (1 Episode: "Dorky Housecall, M.D.")
1994	Star Trek: The Next Generation	Jason Vigo	Les Landau	TV series (1 Episode: "Bloodlines")
1994	Sisters	Joe	Janet G. Knutsen	TV series (1 Episode: "Heroes")
1994	Power Play	Cody Harris	Rocky Lane	
1995	Ellen	Alternate Juror #16	Tom Cherones	TV series (1 Episode: "The Apartment Hunt")
1995	Double Rush	Brad	Michael Lembeck	TV series (1 Episode: "Comings and Goings")
1995	Digital Man	Sergeant Anders	Phillip J. Roth	
1995	Silk Stalkings	Jed Morgan	Robert Walden	TV series (1 Episode: "Kill Shot")
1996	High Tide	Ron Gregory		TV series (2 episodes)
1996	Pacific Blue	Steven Armitage	Ronald Víctor García; Terence H. Winkless	TV series (2 episodes)
1996	Renegade	Neal Kirby / Curley Cannon	Russell Solberg	TV series (2 episodes)
1997	Total Reality	Commander Swift	Phillip J. Roth (2)	
1997	T.N.T.	Basu	Robert Radler	
1997	Darkdrive	Steven Falcon	Phillip J. Roth (3)	
1997	A Time to Revenge	Will	John Harwood	
1998	Marry Me or Die		Bob Hoge	
1999	Velocity Trap	Nick Simmons	Phillip J. Roth (4)	
2000	18 Wheels of Justice	Randy	Camilo Vila	TV series (1 Episode: "Triple Play")
2000	Daybreak	Deputy Mayor John Ellis	Jean Pellerin	
2001	Falcon Down	Captain Bobby Edwards	Phillip J. Roth (5)	
2002	General Hospital	Jacob		TV series (1 episode)
2003	JAG	Chief MacDonald	Kenny Johnson	TV series (1 Episode: "Empty Quiver")
2005	Johnny Virus	Mark	W.W. Vought	
2010	Criminal Minds	Chris Edwards	Charles Haid	TV series (1 Episode: "Devil's Night")
2011	House	General Spain	Greg Yaitanes	TV series (1 Episode: "The Fix")
2013	Dark Power	Lee Rudman	John Milton Branton	
2014	See Dad Run	Chip	Jonathan Judge	TV series (1 Episode: "See Dad Roast the Toast")
2015	Battle Creek	Firefighter	Andrew Bernstein	TV series (1 Episode: "Sympathy for the Devil")
