= List of Covert Affairs episodes =

Covert Affairs is an American spy drama created by Matt Corman and Chris Ord, which originally aired on the USA Network. Piper Perabo and Christopher Gorham star as Annie Walker and Auggie Anderson, two CIA agents working together on missions all around the world with the help of their bosses, Joan (Kari Matchett) and Arthur (Peter Gallagher), and associate Jai (Sendhil Ramamurthy). Annie must also deal with her home life and her sister Danielle (Anne Dudek).

The first season of this one-hour drama premiered on Tuesday, July 13, 2010, following White Collar, and ended on September 14, 2010. The show was renewed for a second season on August 19, 2010; the second season started airing on June 7, 2011. New episodes aired until August 9, and the last six aired from November 1 until December 6, 2011. The show was renewed for a third season, which began on July 10, 2012, and consists of 16 episodes. On September 25, 2012, the show was renewed for a 16-episode fourth season, which began airing July 16, 2013. On October 3, 2013, the series was renewed for a 16-episode fifth season, which premiered on June 24, 2014. On January 6, 2015, it was reported that USA had opted to cancel the show.

== Series overview ==
Season	Episodes	Originally released	
Season	Episodes	First released	Last released
1	11	July 13, 2010	September 14, 2010
2	16	June 7, 2011	December 6, 2011
3	16	July 10, 2012	November 20, 2012
4	16	July 16, 2013	November 21, 2013
5	16	June 24, 2014	December 18, 2014

== Episodes ==
=== Season 1 (2010) ===
Season one of Covert Affairs comprises eleven episodes. With the exception of the pilot episode, all Season 1 episode titles are also titles of songs by Led Zeppelin.

No. overall	No. in season	Title	Directed by	Written by	Original release date	Prod. code	US viewers (millions)
1	1	"Pilot"	Tim Matheson	Matt Corman & Chris Ord	July 13, 2010	CA101	4.88
Annie Walker is a new CIA trainee agent who is unexpectedly sent out into the field because of her language skills (she can speak six different languages). Auggie Anderson, a blind agent, is Annie's guide in her new life at the DPD (Domestic Protection Division) at the CIA headquarters in Langley, Virginia. Her first mission is to retrieve information from a Russian spy at a hotel. As the exchange starts, the informant is killed. Annie makes it out of the room but is unable to retrieve the intel. She goes back for it but doesn't believe the person who died is who they say they are, so she investigates further, only to get in trouble about protocol and using civilians to help on a case. Eventually the real spy emerges and almost kills Annie, but her ex-boyfriend, Ben Mercer (Eion Bailey), whom she is searching for, helps her by killing the spy. Annie is not sure if she actually saw Ben, so she tells her boss, Joan Campbell, about him. Joan dismisses it and assures her that another agent got there just in time to save Annie. However, Joan and her husband Arthur Campbell know who Ben Mercer is, but not what his intentions are. They decide to keep Annie in the field in hopes that Ben will reemerge from wherever he is hiding.
2	2	"Walter's Walk"	Félix Alcalá	Matt Corman & Chris Ord	July 20, 2010	CA102	5.21
Annie is assigned to "walk-in" duty where she meets a boy-genius and his mother. The boy has seemingly acquired real, viable intelligence that puts both him and his mother in danger. Annie is assigned to work on the case in conjunction with an MI-6 agent. While protecting the boy and his mother, she realizes that her supposed MI-6 partner is a double agent and is the one hunting down the boy.
3	3	"South Bound Suarez"	John Kretchmer	James Parriott	July 27, 2010	CA103	4.83
Annie must get close to a Venezuelan exchange student (Michael Steger), whose sister (Lana Parrilla) is romantically involved with a ruthless government agent from his native country. Annie travels to Venezuela in order to convince the woman to help the CIA with their case. After agreeing to help Annie out, the Venezuelans are flown out of the country to protect them.
4	4	"No Quarter"	Allan Kroeker	Stephen Hootstein	August 3, 2010	CA104	5.30
When a routine exchange is compromised in Zurich, Annie finds herself on the run from the authorities. She then finds herself at odds with Eyal Lavin (Oded Fehr), a senior Mossad agent with whom she was supposed to be doing the exchange and whom she only meets at the safe house after the failure. Eyal, who is dismissive of young agents, develops a grudging respect for Annie's skills, as the two of them determine that another Mossad agent is trying to steal the information and frame them. They survive, complete the mission, and return home safely. Meanwhile, the CIA conducts an internal investigation to contain a leak within the agency, with Auggie under suspicion.
5	5	"In the Light"	Jonathan Glassner	Meredith Lavender & Marcie Ulin	August 10, 2010	CA105	5.17
The DPD receives information about a shipment linked to a weapons dealer, and sends Annie to enlist an ex-CIA operative (Eriq La Salle) with a grudge against the agency to stop the dealer before it's too late. Meanwhile, Annie's romance from two years earlier makes an appearance in an unexpected way.
6	6	"Houses of the Holy"	Alex Chapple	Dana Calvo	August 17, 2010	CA106	5.36
Annie is tasked by the DPD to uncover a leak within the Senate, but as Annie begins to hunt for the truth, she finds there's more beneath the surface than once thought. Also, Auggie is brought in as a handler for the Special Ops unit he used to work under, and Annie suspects her sister's husband is cheating on Danielle (Anne Dudek).
7	7	"Communication Breakdown"	Kate Woods	Matthew Lau	August 24, 2010	CA107	5.87
A computer hacker (Liane Balaban) shuts down all the communication systems in the Washington D.C. area, and Auggie is tasked to get the code for the CIA. However, Auggie discovers that the hacker is actually his ex-girlfriend Natasha and he must stop her.
8	8	"What Is and What Should Never Be"	Rod Hardy	Brett Conrad	August 31, 2010	CA108	5.26
After Annie witnesses a suspicious purchase at an art auction during an investigation, her follow-up brings a surprise visitor, Ben Mercer, back into her life again.
9	9	"Fool in the Rain"	Vincent Misiano	Stephen Hootstein	September 7, 2010	CA109	5.40
An Iranian trade delegate (Mousa Kraish) who escaped his handlers during a trip to Toronto approaches the CIA to cut a deal. He is willing to hand over stolen intelligence in exchange for entry to the United States.
10	10	"I Can't Quit You Baby"	Ken Girotti	James Parriott	September 14, 2010	CA110	4.59
Annie has a new assignment to pose as a potential recruit for diamond smugglers in London and convince them to hire her. Meanwhile, Henry Wilcox (Gregory Itzin), the former CIA Director of the National Clandestine Service is invited back by Arthur and Joan to help on a mission, but this tests the chain of command.
11	11	"When the Levee Breaks"	Allan Kroeker	Matt Corman & Chris Ord	September 14, 2010	CA111	5.23
Ben Mercer walks into the CIA Headquarters and confronts Annie about her past. They travel back to Sri Lanka to work together on a mission to rescue an asset there. Meanwhile, it is revealed that journalist Liza Hearn's (Emmanuelle Vaugier) source is Henry Wilcox and Joan has been asked to replace Arthur as the DCS (Director of Clandestine Services).

=== Season 2 (2011) ===
The show was renewed for a second season on August 19, 2010. Production began in March 2011, and the season premiered on June 7, 2011. Ben Lawson appeared in several episodes as Dr. Scott Weiss, a physician at a local emergency room. Rena Sofer appeared in multiple episodes as Gina, Arthur Campbell's ex-wife. Jaimie Alexander portrayed Reva Kline, a former analyst who begins working in the field, in various episodes throughout the season. Oded Fehr reprised his role as Eyal Lavin, a Mossad agent, in two episodes. Additional guest stars included Santiago Cabrera, Tim Guinee, Rebecca Mader, Benito Martinez, and Peter Stormare. The first half of the season, consisting of 10 episodes, concluded on August 9, 2011, while the remaining six episodes began airing on November 1, 2011. All Season 2 episode titles are also titles of songs by R.E.M.

No. overall	No. in season	Title	Directed by	Written by	Original release date	Prod. code	US viewers (millions)
12	1	"Begin the Begin"	Kate Woods	Matt Corman & Chris Ord	June 7, 2011	CA201	4.56
Ben and Annie return to Washington D.C., where Ben disappears again. However, Annie is quickly assigned another mission when she has to protect an Estonian tennis player (Marija Karan) who is considered a CIA asset but who claims to want to end her connection. Working on her own after the mission is terminated, Annie learns that the tennis player's new coach is a Russian agent, and both she and her boyfriend need to be rescued before the Russians eliminate them.
13	2	"Good Advices"	Ken Girotti	Stephen Hootstein	June 14, 2011	CA202	3.92
While trying to turn a secretary working at the Syrian embassy in Paris into a CIA asset, Annie crosses paths with an old acquaintance, Mossad agent Eyal Lavin (Oded Fehr), who also tries to gain the secretary as an asset. After the secretary is murdered, Annie uses the information they have already received to photograph an international terrorist, with Eyal's help, and then has to save Eyal, who is kidnapped by Syrians at the end of the mission.
14	3	"Bang and Blame"	Allan Kroeker	Erica Shelton	June 21, 2011	CA203	4.03
Annie befriends Dr. Scott Weiss (Ben Lawson) while taking her niece to the emergency room but then is sent back to Camp Peary ("The Farm") after the name of a CIA trainee is leaked in a pet-care chatroom that serves as a front for the Iranians. Although the CIA suspects that a trainer (Tim Guinee) at The Farm is the leak, he convinces Annie of his innocence. She then identifies and captures the actual leak, a fellow student with family CIA connections, and finally graduates from The Farm.
15	4	"All the Right Friends"	Stephen Kay	Norman Morrill	June 28, 2011	CA204	4.01
While on a seemingly safe "spy trade" mission in Argentina, Annie and an Italian spy (Ignacio Serricchio) must go on the run after an attempt is made on their lives at the exchange point. Annie realises that her fellow spy is actually a reporter being targeted for having uncovered (but not yet published) details of a petroleum scandal, but she has to avoid capture by the local police while finding a way out of the country for both of them. Meanwhile, Auggie is offered a new, senior position in the Office of Congressional Affairs and accepts, despite the fact that he will have to become "overt".
16	5	"Around the Sun"	Félix Alcalá	Dana Calvo	July 5, 2011	CA205	4.81
During a mission looking into a potential leak at NASA that could threaten U.S. spy satellites, Annie has to get used to working with a new tech operative, Reva (Jaimie Alexander), after Auggie takes the OCA position. After Reva and the DPD conclude that Annie has identified the leak and the mission is over, Annie concludes that the leak is actually covering for his son and manages to avert a larger leak. Despite doing well on his first assignment, Auggie decides to maintain covert cover and reverses his decision about OCA.
17	6	"The Outsiders"	Marc Roskin	Julia Ruchman	July 12, 2011	CA206	4.30
Annie and Reva are captured near the Polish-Belarusian border by a man (Peter Stormare) working for the Belarusian secret police when they try to deploy anti-smuggling surveillance cameras in the Bialowieza Forest. Jai, who is interviewing for a new job in Berlin, is tasked with assembling an extraction team to rescue them in Belarus, a task which becomes more difficult when his helicopter malfunctions, followed by Annie and Reva escaping with the secret police on their tail.
18	7	"Half a World Away"	Félix Alcalá	Julia Ruchman	July 19, 2011	CA207	4.55
While on his vacation to the international jazz festival in Istanbul, Auggie inadvertently records the voice of the man who set up his squad for ambush and injured him during the war in Iraq. Auggie is aided by a flight attendant (Rebecca Mader) in his new, personal mission: identifying and ultimately capturing the man. Annie learns the whole story of Auggie's blinding.
19	8	"Welcome to the Occupation"	John Fawcett	Zak Schwartz	July 26, 2011	CA208	4.36
Joan receives a distress text message from her old partner (Sonya Salomaa), who is in deep cover as an oil executive in Central America. She goes back into the field with Annie and Ben to rescue her by posing as a television crew to investigate a hostage situation in a corporate skyscraper that has been taken over by eco-terrorists in Mexico City. Meanwhile, Jai learns of his father's (Gregory Itzin) link to Liza Hearn (Emmanuelle Vaugier).
20	9	"Sad Professor"	J. Miller Tobin	Alex Berger	August 2, 2011	CA209	4.61
When Annie's former professor is killed by clandestine Pakistani operatives, she must inform his widow (Laara Sadiq) that he was a CIA operative and help finish his last mission. Also, Annie struggles with keeping her secret identity from her sister.
21	10	"World Leader Pretend"	Kate Woods	Matt Corman & Chris Ord	August 9, 2011	CA210	4.70
While Annie runs an extraction mission for a Chinese scientist she's been corresponding with who is willing to defect, she runs into complications and is forced to make a difficult choice when they both seem to have been poisoned with polonium. A friend of the scientist at the Asian Cultural Organization is the prime suspect when Annie discovers he may be a spy for the PLA special forces. Meanwhile, Joan transfers Jai to a new division in Arizona, and after two years, Annie finally tells Danielle her CIA secret, leading her sister to distrust her and ask Annie to move out.
22	11	"The Wake-Up Bomb"	Stephen Kay	Stephen Hootstein	November 1, 2011	CA211	2.70
After failing a mission in Venice, Annie feels lonely during some time off and meets a chef (Santiago Cabrera) with connections to the ETA, a Basque separatist movement, through his brother.
23	12	"Uberlin"	Jonathan Glassner	Erica Shelton	November 8, 2011	CA212	2.67
While on assignment in Berlin, Annie tries to turn a former Stasi agent and money launderer's wife (Nina Kronjäger) into a CIA asset while tracking down her husband and simultaneously keeping tabs on Arthur, who meets with his old flame. Meanwhile Auggie goes to a memorial for an old friend and meets his friend's sister, Parker.
24	13	"A Girl Like You"	Stephen Kay	Norman Morrill	November 15, 2011	CA213	2.26
Mossad agent Eyal Lavin (Oded Fehr) returns to Washington D.C. posing as an operative of the CIA, and Annie is tasked with tracking him down and uncovering his real motives.
25	14	"Horse to Water"	Rosemary Rodriguez	Alex Berger	November 22, 2011	CA214	2.29
After the murder of an asset in Russia, Annie must consider the possibility that the daughter of a CIA analyst, imprisoned for selling intelligence, is involved with her father's plan and has to keep an eye on her.
26	15	"What's the Frequency, Kenneth?"	Omar Madha	Donald Joh	November 29, 2011	CA215	3.22
An MI6 operative (Tony Curran) mistakes Annie for an actual Smithsonian employee and attempts to recruit her for a covert op he bases on a hunch about a "dodgy" art restorer at the museum.
27	16	"Letter Never Sent"	Allan Kroeker	Matt Corman & Chris Ord	December 6, 2011	CA216	3.20
When Annie and Danielle go vacationing in Stockholm, Sweden, it turns dangerous when Danielle is mistaken for a spy. Jai Wilcox reveals his plans to Arthur, after having triggered a somewhat unexpected situation. His father Henry Wilcox ends up being denounced as the source leaking confidential information to journalist Liza Hearn.

=== Season 3 (2012) ===
On September 15, 2011, USA Network renewed the series for a 16-episode third season, which premiered July 10, 2012. Sarah Clarke began a recurring role in the first episode as Lena Smith, a highly regarded agent who serves as Annie's mentor when Annie is transferred to a new section. Oded Fehr will resume his recurring role as Mossad agent Eyal Lavin in both the summer and fall seasons, and Daniella Alonso will recur as Suzanne Wilkins, a DPD therapist. Rena Sofer will return as Gina, Arthur's ex-wife, in one episode. Devin Kelley returned as Parker, Auggie's girlfriend, and Brendan Hines appeared in the third episode as Wade, a man who works alongside Parker in the Peace Corps. The series also introduced British actor Richard Coyle in a recurring role as Simon Fischer, a British businessman to whom Annie is assigned, who may also be a Russian spy. All Season 3 episode titles except "Hello Stranger" are also titles of songs by David Bowie.

No. overall	No. in season	Title	Directed by	Written by	Original release date	Prod. code	US viewers (millions)
28	1	"Hang on to Yourself"	Allan Kroeker	Matt Corman & Chris Ord	July 10, 2012	CA301	3.50
When Jai is killed by a car bomb, Auggie is put in charge of his department, Office of Special Projects. Annie is reassigned to Lena, a new, less orthodox boss, who sends her to Marrakesh after Simon Fischer, a mysterious Russian-born English businessman. Annie calls Lena to update her on her progress, noting that German tourists who approached her and Simon seemed more like part of a plan. Lena agrees to Annie's request for a sweep drive. In Simon's hotel room, she uses the sweep drive and is looking at the passports for the German tourists she has found when he enters the room. She decides to join him in the shower, as a distraction, while a televised news report announces that the two German tourists have been found dead. Back home, Auggie also hears the news and receives some of Jai's files, one of which bears the symbol which is tattooed on Simon's back.
29	2	"Sound and Vision"	Stephen Kay	Stephen Hootstein	July 17, 2012	CA302	3.22
A Canadian couple is arrested in Barcelona. They were there to purchase a computer virus from the Red Rover, a hacker whose identity is unknown. Annie and Auggie go undercover as the couple in order to retrieve the virus. The two playfully play the part of a married couple, and then he reveals to her that he is planning to propose marriage to Parker. Joan calls to say the Canadian couple has been found murdered. They prepare to leave with the virus until Chinese operatives obtain it. Auggie decides to track down Red Rover to elicit an anti-virus. They find her and take her home to Joan. Meanwhile, Arthur fails to elicit information from Henry Wilcox as each blames the other for Jai's death.
30	3	"The Last Thing You Should Do"	Félix Alcalá	Norman Morrill	July 24, 2012	CA303	3.74
Auggie proposes to Parker while they visit the Red Sea. One of her Peace Corps friends gets injured and a distress call is made, which Auggie knows is a bad idea. Pirates soon arrive but Auggie is able to call Annie before the phone is taken. Joan is forced to team up with Annie and Lena to rescue Auggie. While in captivity, Auggie admits to Parker that he is a CIA agent and she, momentarily, does not trust him. Meanwhile, after a rescue attempt fails, the pirates make plans to move their hostages. Auggie knows they must make an escape in transit. He is able to call Annie and she sends a helicopter to aid the escape. Auggie again proposes to Parker and she accepts. During the mission, Simon calls Annie on her NOC line and ask if she has his phone charger. He asks her to bring it to him in Paris. Later, Annie tells Lena that they can use this charger to track him. Danielle tells Annie that her husband wants to make their marriage work and that they are moving to California.
31	4	"Speed of Life"	Michael Smith	Erica Shelton	July 31, 2012	CA304	2.58
In Reston, Virginia, RDI, which houses defense contracts, is broken into by a burglar with links to Simon. Annie discusses their options with Lena. Later Simon calls to say he is in Washington, D.C. and suggests staying at her place. Lena scrambles to come up with a fake residence for Annie. Annie learns that several government agencies will monitor a meeting between the RDI burglar and his contact. Believing the contact to be Simon, Lena insists on Annie dissuading him from making the exchange, fearing his arrest will ruin their entire operation. Annie cannot convince him but the planned meeting is another ruse by Simon, who meets elsewhere with an RDI security guard. Because it is thought her cover is blown, Annie is transferred back to Joan's department. However, Simon later pulls up to Annie, admits that he likes her, and she gets into his car. Meanwhile, newly-engaged Parker struggles with Auggie being a CIA agent and questions their past, which results in her breaking off their engagement. Later, Auggie gets drunk at Allen's pub, and gets into a fight, breaking a bottle over a man's head. He is arrested at the end of the episode.
32	5	"This Is Not America"	Allan Kroeker	Julia Ruchman	August 14, 2012	CA305	3.25
Annie and Eyal Lavin (Oded Fehr) look for the source of a leak in Israel after an Iranian missile is found to contain secret American technology. Arthur bails out Auggie and sends him back to his former position under Joan, who orders him to undergo therapy. Arthur is told he is under consideration to be ambassador to China, which threatens his relationship with Joan. Though under orders to stay away from Simon, Annie obtains additional information about him, as a gift from Eyal.
33	6	"Hello Stranger"	Elodie Keene	Steve Harper	August 21, 2012	CA306	3.51
When the Yemeni prime minister is brought to Minnesota for medical treatment, Annie has a short window of time to recruit his chief aide as an asset. She gives him a contact phone number before they separate, but then Joan denies his family's immunity request. Meanwhile, Auggie takes his therapist on a field trip, including blindfolding her so she can experience things as a blind person. Joan fears that Arthur's hopes for the China position are compromising the CIA's interests. Back at the office, Annie informs Joan that she is requesting a transfer from the DPD and later receives a phone call from the Yemeni aide, which Joan has allowed.
34	7	"Loving the Alien"	J. Miller Tobin	Alex Berger	August 28, 2012	CA307	3.23
Annie accepts Simon's invitation to accompany him to Cuba, using Lena's help to hide the trip from the rest of the CIA. Simon introduces Annie to Hector (Nestor Serrano), his handler and a KGB hit man. She feels uncomfortable around Hector and asks Simon to cut their vacation short. Before taking her to the airport, he kills Hector. Lena suggests Simon loves Annie, which means he can be manipulated. Meanwhile, Arthur has second thoughts about leaving the CIA for the ambassador's job, and, against Arthur's orders, Auggie questions an imprisoned Henry Wilcox (Gregory Itzin) about Jai's death. Henry provides the address to Jai's safehouse.
35	8	"Glass Spider"	Stephen Kay	Zak Schwartz	September 4, 2012	CA308	3.44
At the safe house, Auggie and Annie discover that Jai was investigating Simon Fischer. Auggie tells everyone that Simon is in DC. Annie confesses her involvement with Simon to Arthur and Joan, and proposes that she meet with him and ask him to surrender to the CIA. At the meeting, Simon identifies and shoots an assassin, who later commits suicide to avoid capture. As he and Annie flee, he turns down her offer and escapes. Annie recognizes the assassin as having been present when Jai was killed. Annie goes home where she finds Simon, who proposes that they both flee to a remote island. She initially accepts, but just as she is reconsidering, Lena arrives and shoots both Annie and Simon.
36	9	"Suffragette City"	Félix Alcalá	Tamara Becher	September 11, 2012	CA309	3.94
Simon is dead, and Annie is rushed to the hospital for heart surgery. Lena has arranged the crime scene to make it appear that Annie and Simon shot each other, and arranged other evidence to make it appear that Annie is selling secrets to the Russians. Auggie believes in Annie, Arthur does not, and Joan is not sure. Arthur refuses to allow Auggie access to the evidence against Annie. Auggie eventually learns that a false passport was found on her (the one she took to Cuba) and tracks down the man who made it, but arrives just after Lena has killed him. He smells Lena's perfume, allowing him to identify her as the real traitor. Auggie threatens to resign unless Joan gives him access to the evidence, and Joan covertly allows him access. Annie wakes up in the hospital only to be assaulted by Lena. Joan and Auggie arrive, but Lena escapes. As Joan orders the exits from Washington secured, doctors attempt to restart Annie's heart. Throughout the episode, the unconscious Annie dreams about interactions with the other characters.
37	10	"Let's Dance"	Andrew Bernstein	Matt Corman & Chris Ord	September 18, 2012	CA310	3.47
Lena has escaped to Moscow, where she has killed several CIA agents sent to kill her. Only partially recovered from her shooting, Annie identifies a musician there, Dmitri Larionov, as a retired spy with ties to Lena. Knowing she will go anyway, Joan sends Annie (against CIA policy) to photograph Lena and return, so that extradition can be negotiated. Annie meets Dmitri and gets his help in stopping Lena's car for the photograph, but instead walks into an ambush. The resulting incident derails the negotiations and embarrasses both Arthur and Joan, who offers Arthur her resignation. Annie learns that Dmitri has been seduced by Lena, who did not have her killed in the ambush because she wants to meet with her. In a confrontation at an isolated dacha, Lena tries to convince Annie to become a double agent. When this fails, she attempts to distract Annie and pulls a hidden gun on her, prompting Annie to shoot her in self-defense.
38	11	"Rock 'n' Roll Suicide"	Stephen Kay	Stephen Hootstein	October 16, 2012	CA311	2.76
After Joan and Arthur have no luck in finding a way to secure Annie's release from a Russian prison, Auggie turns to Eyal (from Mossad) for help in arranging Annie's escape and bringing Annie home. However, Annie gives her "clean" passport to Simon Fischer's sister for her own escape. Annie and Eyal are then captured just before leaving Russia as stowaways on a Polish cargo plane. Annie and Eyal deduce that her Russian interrogator had been known by Simon to be an embezzler and use that knowledge to bargain for their lives with the interrogator, trading Eyal's "clean" passport for their escape.
39	12	"Wishful Beginnings"	Tawnia McKiernan	Julia Ruchman	October 23, 2012	CA312	2.75
Back from Russia, Annie is scheduled to be debriefed at the CIA's Bluebonnet farm but is unexpectedly recalled to Langley. Eyal and his Mossad superior Rivka Singer (Tovah Feldshuh) arrive in Washington to ask the CIA's help in obtaining a watch that contains information from a Saudi businessman, Khalid Ansari, with connections high in the US government. Joan assigns Annie to work with them, but tells her not to share the information from the watch with Mossad if she gets it. Eyal and Annie find the Mossad asset (a flight attendant) who had the watch, but she dies, having been poisoned by a rogue former CIA agent now working for Khalid. They discover that she had earlier buried a key to a safe-deposit box. Annie impersonates the asset to recover the watch, but the former agent ambushes her and takes the box that contained the watch. The man escapes Annie and Eyal, but Annie reveals that she had actually hidden the watch on her wrist while accessing the safe deposit box. Despite Joan's orders, Annie gives a copy of the information on the watch to Eyal. When Annie cannot stay in her home due to the memories of being shot by Lena, Eyal offers her his Washington apartment. Later, Eyal and Rivka discuss a larger Mossad operation in which Annie is apparently a target, but Eyal conceals Annie's new whereabouts from Rivka. Meanwhile, Joan had fallen back into an addiction to prescription drugs and resumes attending support group meetings with her former lover Seth, a State Department lawyer.
40	13	"Man in the Middle"	Christopher Gorham	Alex Berger	October 30, 2012	CA313	2.35
At Eyal's apartment, Annie receives a package under the door with information about Khalid planning to meet a newly-identified terrorist. Encouraged by her confidence that Eyal is trustworthy (and assuming that he sent it), Annie takes the information to Joan. Joan is skeptical and refuses to act on it, telling Annie to report back to the CIA farm for debriefing. Annie then goes straight to Arthur, who orders a drone strike when Annie is able to get Khalid's location from his D.C, girlfriend, Megan Carr. Arthur asks Joan about her renewed contact with Seth, but she evades an answer. Parker shows up and asks Auggie for help for her parents; while solving the problem, Auggie becomes acquainted with Operation Proper Exit. The drone strike fails in the end, with Khalid escaping and going underground, but Annie manages to save Megan from an ambush by Khalid's hit man. Annie and Joan's relationship disintegrates over the drone strike. While completing the file on the operation prior to her transfer out of DPD, Annie discovers that the photos of the terrorist had been "doctored." She bursts into Arthur's office, interrupting Joan telling Arthur about her addiction issues; Joan blames Annie for trusting Eyal.
41	14	"Scary Monsters (and Super Creeps)"	Emile Levisetti	Tamara Becher	November 6, 2012	CA314	2.28
The failed drone strike on Khalid produces immediate political fallout, with Arthur being called before a Senate Intelligence Committee hearing that day. Joan sends Annie home and then back to the CIA farm, but her trip is interrupted by information from Eyal that Khalid is targeting Megan. Upon arriving at Megan's safe house, Annie finds that Megan has disappeared and that she has been tailed by Eyal. She accepts his help when they learn that Khalid's enforcer Griffin Cole has apparently kidnapped Megan. Auggie's technical team concludes that Mossad faked the photo in the intelligence package, and Joan confronts Rivka, who blames the falsified information on Eyal. Annie asks Eyal, and, after she tells him what Rivka said, he admits to it, despite Annie's disbelief. During the Senate hearing, Arthur notices a possible link between the Mossad intelligence and an Israeli agricultural official. Eyal and Annie locate Cole's brother, who tells them that Cole had merely given Megan a plane ticket to meet Khalid but had never kidnapped her. After Cole captures Annie, Eyal kills him. Joan tells Arthur that she intends to take some time off and reprieves Annie from going to the CIA farm. Arthur learns that Henry Wilcox is being given immediate early release from prison and decides to visit him before his release. Auggie is asked to join the next Iraq trip of Operation Proper Exit and gives Annie his old Army blanket before leaving. Eyal meets with Rivka and tells her that he confirmed her story but, because of it, he would quit Mossad after this mission. Megan arrives at Khalid's villa and names Annie Walker as the CIA agent with whom she met.
42	15	"Quicksand"	Jamie Barber	Zak Schwartz	November 13, 2012	CA315	2.45
Annie gets word that Megan has been killed in Luxembourg and impersonates Megan's sister to recover Megan's personal effects. She discovers instead that Khalid has set a trap, and with Auggie off in Iraq (participating in Operation Proper Exit) she must rely on Eyal for an escape plan to Zurich. There she and Eyal resolve to find Khalid together. With some help from Joan, they plan to identify and track a courier taking money to Khalid from his father. They discover the courier is Megan, who is killed immediately after rejecting Annie's help, but the killer leaves the money behind. Annie and Eyal return to their safe house in Zurich, but Khalid's men storm the house. Eyal allows himself to be captured so that Annie can escape. She follows Eyal's tracking device to Amsterdam, where she finds only a hidden cell phone with the tracker attached. Meanwhile, Arthur interviews Henry just before his release, and Henry admits that he was the source behind the Mossad intelligence and claims that the drone strike was a success. Arthur then learns that further Senate hearings into the drone strike have been cancelled.
43	16	"Lady Stardust"	Renny Harlin	Matt Corman & Chris Ord	November 20, 2012	CA316	2.47
The cell phone rings and it is Khalid, who is holding Eyal and offers to release him in exchange for the names of all CIA assets within his father's company. Annie is ready to comply but calls Auggie for advice, leaving a voicemail. Auggie suddenly arrives in Amsterdam and devises a successful plan to free Eyal without giving up the information. As all three are on their way to a waiting ship, Arthur and Joan tell Annie that the Saudi and Dutch governments have agreed to allow Khalid to leave for Saudi Arabia, where he will be untouchable. They tell her exactly when and where he will leave, which Annie interprets as instructions to kill Khalid first. She sneaks away from Auggie and Eyal with a gun, but when she finds Khalid she holds him at gunpoint and gives him information that will set him at deadly odds with his father. Annie and Eyal part on good terms, with Eyal planning to retire to sailing in Greece. Back in Washington, Henry attends the declassification ceremony for Jai and then meets with Annie at the cafe where Jai was killed. He enlists Annie in some unknown project which she agrees to after seeing a secret file. Later, arriving at Annie's house, Auggie kisses Annie.

=== Season 4 (2013) ===
On September 25, 2012, the series was renewed for a 16-episode fourth season. Hill Harper will join the cast as a series regular, playing a station chief with higher aspirations but questionable motives, looking to Annie and Auggie for assistance. Season 4 began airing July 16, 2013. All Season 4 episode titles are taken from names of songs by The Pixies.

No. overall	No. in season	Title	Directed by	Written by	Original release date	Prod. code	US viewers (millions)
44	1	"Vamos"	Stephen Kay	Matt Corman & Chris Ord	July 16, 2013	CA401	2.39
Henry's secret file contains evidence that Arthur is covertly sending money to a Colombian "terrorist" named Teo, also known as "the Puma". Annie and Auggie, now lovers, travel to Colombia to investigate. They meet Teo, who helps them when Auggie is shot but then rejects them when someone shoots at him and Annie. On the plane back, Auggie tells Annie that Teo is Arthur's son and they plan to disclose their relationship to Arthur. Arthur tells a woman, involved in the money transfers, that he is breaking off relations. The next day, he announces that he is resigning as DCS (just as Henry had earlier predicted to Annie) because he has had an extramarital affair.
45	2	"Dig For Fire"	Félix Alcalá	Stephen Hootstein	July 23, 2013	CA402	2.67
After a somewhat revealing conversation with Arthur, Annie meets with Henry and then follows him to the offices of an oil company whose operations in Colombia have been a target of Teo's group. Auggie and Annie determine that Seth, Joan's old flame and recovery acquaintance, was part of a phone conversation with Henry and the oil people. Seth is also attempting to romance Joan, who has just learned that she is pregnant. Arthur admits to Annie and Auggie that the alleged affair is a ruse to protect Joan from involvement in Arthur's problems, but Auggie knows more about this than he is yet telling Annie. Annie breaks into Seth's apartment when he is supposed to be on a date with Joan, but Joan decides not to go on the date so Seth returns early and finds her. In the resulting fight Seth falls off a bridge and apparently drowns. Joan confronts Arthur with both her pregnancy and her conclusion that the affair never happened. Annie meets again with Henry, who asks her to return to Colombia and kill Teo before he again attacks "American interests".
46	3	"Into the White"	Stephen Kay	Julia Ruchman	July 30, 2013	CA403	2.29
Arthur tells Annie that he has been running Teo as an unauthorized double agent within the ALC terror organization. Annie agrees to take Teo an "exit package" to help him leave Colombia. Teo refuses it in a brief meeting, but Annie is able to put a tracking device on him. This allows CIA Colombia station chief Calder Michaels (Hill Harper) to organize an assault on an ALC base, capture Teo, and bring him to a black site where he interrogates him about a coming ALC bomb attack. Teo will not talk to Michaels or to Annie and manages to escape, but Annie has determined the target. She finds Teo with a sniper rifle, watching the hotel where an oil company meeting is about to occur. He now claims to be still loyal to the CIA; Annie trusts him enough to let him fire the sniper rifle, killing an ALC operative in an explosive vest. Annie agrees to run him as a mole within the international terror world, and as a show of good faith he gives her the names of two money launderers in Washington. Meanwhile, Auggie tells Joan about Seth's apparent death. Joan cleans Seth's apartment of evidence of the fight with Annie, and also opens Seth's safe to find compromising pictures of a hostile senator, allowing her to win confirmation as the new DCS.
47	4	"Rock A My Soul"	Félix Alcalá	Thania St. John	August 6, 2013	CA404	2.66
Auggie is made Joan's interim replacement as head of DPD, and his first job is to investigate the Chens, the married Chinese couple identified by Teo as terrorist financiers. Annie follows the Chens to a meeting with Henry, who offers them a graceful end to their relationship with him. Henry then meets with Annie, telling her about a gap in Auggie's pre-blindness service record. He also meets with Arthur and vows to destroy Teo in revenge for Jai's death. Auggie meets secretly with Teo, who for some reason is in DC. The Chens prepare to flee; Annie, against Auggie's orders, reveals herself and gets them to a safe house. Seeing that such conflicts are threatening their relationship, Auggie reveals that he was training Teo during that gap, and that bad intel provided by Teo led to the death of another CIA agent, Auggie's lover. The safe house is attacked, the Chens are killed, and their evidence is taken. Auggie is removed from his interim post and Calder Michaels becomes the new head of DPD.
48	5	"Here Comes Your Man"	Sylvain White	Hank Chilton	August 13, 2013	CA405	2.22
Auggie learns that Henry was behind Calder's promotion. Calder sends Annie to Vienna to establish a business relationship with an arms dealer named Stavros, replacing Auggie with himself as her handler and forbidding the two lovers to communicate. Annie proceeds with Calder's plan to buy some missile launchers from Stavros, until she aborts the mission when she finds Calder's proposed "terrorist buyer" to be inadequate. Stavros sends his man to kill her, but she is rescued by Teo, who was notified by Auggie on his secret untraceable phone. Annie offers Teo as a buyer and the deal is concluded, but Teo then kills Stavros and his man, destroys the secret phone, and leaves, possibly with some of the launchers. Annie tells Calder she killed the men in self-defense. Back in Washington, her reunion with Auggie is interrupted by Henry, who requests a meeting to tell Annie that Seth's body has been found.
49	6	"Space (I Believe In)"	Nick Copus	Zak Schwartz	August 20, 2013	CA406	2.46
Joan appoints Annie as CIA liaison to the FBI investigation of Seth's death, in the hope that she can tie Seth to Henry. It is led by Vincent, an FBI man Annie has clashed with in the past. He quickly deduces that Seth was killed in a fight (by an assailant he will soon be able to identify by DNA testing) and that the CIA cleaned his apartment, but Annie is able to steal the flash drive that was in his jacket, replacing it with one prepared by Auggie. Henry offers Annie a full-time job with his new consulting company. He then sets a plan in motion to save Annie from charges: A credit card hit leads Vincent to a drug dealer, who is killed in a fight when Vincent visits his apartment. After a conversation with Henry, Vincent announces that the DNA found on Seth was the drug dealer's, and the case is closed. Henry then meets with Annie and makes his "final offer" of a job. When she refuses, he threatens her and tells her that Auggie's ex-lover Helen is not dead as Auggie had claimed.
50	7	"Crackity Jones"	Emile Levisetti	Tamara Becher-Wilkinson	August 27, 2013	CA407	2.36
Annie recognizes an old photo of Helen (Michelle Ryan) as Teresa, the woman who was delivering Arthur's payments to Teo. Confronted, Arthur explains that Helen's apparent death was an elaborate ruse on her part and that she now works for him on weapons proliferation. Helen visits Auggie and explains that she needed to be independent of him to continue in the CIA. Helen has learned that Stavros' missing launchers were diverted by an Interpol official working with Henry, and she and Annie are sent to Lyon by Arthur to try to buy them back. When Henry shows up there, Helen urges Annie to abort the mission and then rescues her from a setup when she tries to pursue the deal anyway. Barber and another tech decode an image from Seth's flash drive for Auggie, and it shows that Henry was in Colombia with Eduardo, a terrorist linked to Teo. Calder determines that Annie lied about who killed Stavros. When Annie returns to Washington, she and Auggie suspend their romantic relationship.
51	8	"I've Been Waiting for You"	J. Miller Tobin	Julia Ruchman	September 3, 2013	CA408	2.64
Auggie is able to locate Teo in Scotland with his new tracking system. Annie meets with him and convinces him to meet with Arthur in Virginia; they are far from reconciled but agree to work together. Calder asks Joan for permission to investigate Annie, and she responds by transferring Annie to work directly for her. The plan is for Annie to move Eduardo from one CIA prison to another in Indiana, using Joan's authorization, placing Eduardo and Teo together in the back of a van to elicit information. Calder arrives to question Eduardo, just after Annie has left with him and added Teo to the back of the van. Eduardo says that Henry has been funding the ALC for years and arranged the bombing that killed Teo's mother. Suddenly an unknown driver forces the van to crash and begins shooting. Teo and Annie escape separately and Eduardo is apparently killed in an explosion. Annie returns to DC to find her new apartment ransacked by the CIA. She warns Auggie, who is able only to wipe his hard drives before Calder and a large team arrive. They find his safe, containing Seth's real flash drive, and Calder takes Auggie away for questioning.
52	9	"Hang Wire"	Jamie Barber	Stephen Hootstein	September 10, 2013	CA409	2.20
Annie follows Teo to Copenhagen, where Henry is attending a conference, and disrupts Teo's attempt to assassinate him. She is held by Danish authorities and then suddenly released, to be picked up by Henry and shown his full plan for revenge on Arthur. Henry's men have captured Teo and have one of the missing missile launchers; they use it to destroy a helicopter with six aboard (including an American official) in a way that makes it appear that Teo fired it. In DC, Arthur consults a lawyer about his plan to come clean about Teo. She says that he may escape treason charges as long as Teo's terrorist activities have not resulted in the death of any Americans. Calder tells Auggie that he wants to learn the truth from him rather than turn him in for evidence tampering. They return to CIA headquarters where Auggie helps decrypt the flash drive. Calder is surprised to see the photo of Henry and Eduardo, and Auggie and Joan conclude that he is not working for Henry after all. Annie helps Teo escape from Denmark, but he is shot in the thigh. She drives him to a US base in Germany, where Arthur meets them, but the doctors are unable to save Teo. Rather than return to DC, Annie remains in Germany to find out what Henry is doing there.
53	10	"Levitate Me"	Félix Alcalá	Matt Corman & Chris Ord	September 17, 2013	CA410	3.03
In the wake of the missile attack and Teo's death, Arthur is brought back to DC and placed in custody, Joan is relieved of duty as DCS, Annie is a fugitive in Germany, and Calder is sent with a team to bring Annie back. She is able to reach Frankfurt, evade pursuit, and discover that Henry had dinner with a woman there on his way to Copenhagen. But Henry's man kills the head of Calder's team; the CIA believe Annie did it and reclassify her as a rogue, to be met with deadly force. Henry is brought into the CIA building as a consultant at the urging of the senator Joan earlier blackmailed. Auggie attacks him and is led out of the building. Auggie and Joan (the latter in the hospital with preeclampsia) learn that the woman Henry met with was Sana, his ex-wife and Jai's mother. Annie is able to meet with Calder alone on a rooftop and asks for his help. He lets her escape and tells his team and the CIA that she is going to attack a particular floor of a bank. When she does so, he intercepts her elevator and apparently shoots her, telling the CIA she is dead. As she is moved out, Henry's man checks her pulse and believes her dead. She is loaded onto a hearse driven by Eyal, who revives her with an injection, gives her a Mossad file on Sana, and wishes her well as she disappears into the night.
54	11	"Dead"	Christine Moore	Thania St. John	October 17, 2013	CA411	2.05
Annie changes her appearance and travels to Geneva, where she rents an apartment and join's Sana's grief support group. After a few weeks, Sana has befriended her and given her a job with her fiance's consulting firm. But one of that firm's potential clients turns out to be "Goodman", the agent of Henry's who framed Teo for the helicopter attack. He recognizes Annie, but she is able to attack and subdue him before he can text Henry. As she is loading Goodman into the trunk of his car, Sana stops her at gunpoint. Annie at least temporarily convinces Sana to work with her, and they bring Goodman to Annie's apartment. She begins an enhanced interrogation while Goodman mocks her technique. As she is about to escalate to electric shock, Sana interrupts the interrogation and inadvertently allows Goodman to escape, until he is fatally shot in the ensuing fight with Annie. Annie and Sana then clean the apartment and flee. Meanwhile, in Washington, only Calder and Auggie know that Annie is still alive, and they plot to drive a wedge between Henry and the new DCS, Braithwaite. Joan returns to work in an obscure CIA office, and Arthur is released to house arrest to be with her.
55	12	"Something Against You"	Larysa Kondracki	Steve Harper	October 24, 2013	CA412	1.69
Annie and Sana return to Goodman's hotel room where Annie finds a laptop and flash drive in a safe. She cannot break into the laptop without help, but the flash drive contains "evidence" linking Sana's fiance David to the helicopter attack. Without consulting Sana, Annie launches her plot against Henry by planting the evidence on David's computer, whereupon he is taken away for questioning by Interpol. Annie then gets an angry Sana to beg Henry to come to Geneva, where she interrupts their meeting by texting Henry on Goodman's phone. As Goodman, she extorts a large sum of money from Henry, in the hope of identifying his financial network. But just as Henry is about to transfer the money, he learns that Goodman is dead. He finds and confronts Sana (while Annie hides and observes), threatening her and also saying that he will find and kill the "Jessica Matthews" who led her to betray him. Sana then breaks off cooperation with Annie, saying that she has become a monster like Henry. In Washington, Joan notices Auggie talking to Calder in the building (to advance their plot to split Henry and Braithwaite) and she confronts him, but he does not reveal that Annie is alive. Arthur and Joan send Helen to Geneva to find out more about Henry. She visits Auggie before leaving, saying she still loves him. In Geneva, she follows Henry to his last meeting with Sana and afterward observes Annie leaving.
56	13	"No. 13 Baby"	Roger Kumble	Hank Chilton	October 31, 2013	CA413	1.87
Annie and Helen both return to DC, where Annie arranges to meet Calder. Henry asks Calder to find Jessica Matthews, the killer of CIA deep-cover agent Deric Hughes (a/k/a Goodman). Annie finds Hughes' daughter and learns of a cabin in the Virginia woods at a site she knows Henry to have visited; she goes there and takes photos of the interior but cannot get in alone. Calder leads a team to the cabin, but it explodes when they try to enter. From the photos, Auggie and Barber are able to find the key to a book cipher and read an incriminating message from Hughes to Henry on the laptop. Joan and Arthur decide to depose themselves in order to try and reveal the truth about Henry, but Arthur is dismayed when he learns that Joan had authorized Teo's torture in Medellin. Auggie asks Helen to find Annie, who is not yet communicating with him. She tries and fails to tail Calder, but then observes a meeting between Annie and Calder at Annie's gravesite. Annie detects her afterward and they talk. Helen and Auggie have sex, but they both realize that Auggie is still in love with Annie. Annie prepares to go to New York by bus to find Nelson Smith, the man who was going to transfer money to Henry. Henry tracks her to the bus terminal but Helen intercepts him there. He asserts that she is Jessica Matthews; she agrees, whereupon he shoots her. Annie gets off the bus and goes to Auggie's apartment. She knocks on the door, but does not respond when he answers.
57	14	"River Euphrates"	Christopher Gorham	Stephen Hootstein & Julia Ruchman	November 7, 2013	CA414	1.63
Annie comes to Auggie with the news of Helen's murder. Auggie, distraught, asks Eric Barber to monitor Henry's house. Annie tracks down Nelson Smith, who ultimately gains the drop on her and threatens to expose her to Henry, only to have her remind him that Henry will likely have him killed once he's finished his work. Smith gives her 48 hours to stop Henry and informs her that he has been moving his money through a Brooklyn diamond dealer to Hong Kong. Joan is visited by Annie's FBI acquaintance Vincent who tells her Henry has been using CIA funds to finance his activities and laundering them through a diamond dealer in New York. Joan visits the dealership and runs into Annie, who explains to her what she's been doing. Joan calls Calder and asks him to detain Henry. Both Calder and Auggie send in teams to raid Henry's house only to find a decoy. Annie, Auggie, and Calder head to Hong Kong to find Henry once and for all.
58	15	"There Goes My Gun"	Stephen Kay	Tamara Becher-Wilkinson & Zak Schwartz	November 14, 2013	CA415	1.75
In Hong Kong, Annie and Calder track the courier carrying Henry's diamonds but lose him in a crowd just before he passes them off and is then killed by a passing car. Annie goes to the Hong Kong police as a bystander to see their surveillance tapes, and determines that the recipient of the diamond was Oliver Lee, an official of the Chinese Ministry of State Security. They grab Lee and offer to let him keep the diamonds if he helps them catch Henry. Henry foils their attempt to capture him when he meets with Lee, and Annie finally allows herself to be captured in order to give Auggie and Calder time to escape and take Lee to the US in their plane. (Henry is bemused to learn that she is still alive.) Auggie, however, decides at the last minute to remain in Hong Kong. Meanwhile, in DC, Arthur's lawyer Bianca urges him to take a plea bargain, and he determines that she is in league with Henry. When he confronts her at her stables, an assassin arrives and both kills Bianca and stabs Arthur before being killed by Arthur. Arthur is barely able to warn Joan, who kills another assassin sent to their house.
59	16	"Trompe Le Monde"	Stephen Kay	Story by : Matt Corman & Chris Ord; Teleplay by : Lynn Renee Maxcy	November 21, 2013	CA416	2.34
Henry takes Annie to his Hong Kong business office. Auggie obtains help at the US consulate, but before his team can assault Henry's office, another strike team does so. Henry escapes in the confusion and takes Annie to a safe house known to the MSS. An MSS agent soon arrives and Henry trades Annie to him for the promise of asylum and protection. He leaves and the agent prepares to interrogate Annie with drugs, but she overpowers him and his companion, extracting at gunpoint the fact that Henry is headed for the train station to escape to Beijing. Auggie creates a traffic jam, forcing Henry to walk where Annie is able to find him in an alley and shoot him. He is presumed dead. In DC, Calder determines that Braithwaite ordered the attack on the office to kill Henry before he could reveal the extent of their cooperation; Braithwaite dies by hanging himself in his office. Calder is made interim DCS and arranges to get Annie out of Hong Kong. On her way out, she talks to Joan and a recovering Arthur, who have just become proud parents of a baby boy.

=== Season 5 (2014) ===
On October 3, 2013, the series was renewed for a 16-episode fifth season. Australian actor Nicholas Bishop joined the main cast as a special forces officer turned billionaire with whom Annie will have a complex relationship. Actress Amy Jo Johnson recurred as a counter-terrorism expert who clashes with Auggie. Actor Oded Fehr reprised his role as Mossad agent Eyal Lavin for "at least one [episode]." Kenny Johnson recurred as James Decker, an old friend of Auggie's from his time in the military. All Season 5 episode titles are taken from names of songs by Pavement.

No. overall	No. in season	Title	Directed by	Written by	Original release date	Prod. code	US viewers (millions)
60	1	"Shady Lane"	Félix Alcalá	Matt Corman & Chris Ord	June 24, 2014	CA501	1.88
Annie has been off the grid for four months since killing Henry; her story of a quiet stay at a beach convinces a polygraph but not Auggie or Calder. Khalid (from season 3) resurfaces in Chicago. He is found and killed but leaves evidence leading to Borz Altan, a Muslim veteran of both the US military and the private security firm of Ryan McQuaid. With a clue given by McQuaid, Annie identifies what appears to be a terror threat against the Chicago Board of Trade but is actually a ruse to get a suicide bomber (Borz' brother) into the CIA's secret Chicago facility, where he kills twelve agents including a close friend of Auggie's. Calder remains as interim DCS, and Joan is placed under him as head of DPD on her return from maternity leave. Annie asks to return to working with Auggie as her handler, but she is concealing a medical condition that causes sudden respiratory attacks. Arthur accepts a job with McQuaid Security. Calder assigns Annie the mission of finding Borz and his backers, who clearly have inside knowledge of CIA operations.
61	2	"False Skorpion"	Stephen Kay	Stephen Hootstein	July 1, 2014	CA502	1.72
Annie follows Borz' trail to Maracaibo and tracks him to a mosque, where she instead finds McQuaid with three men. He proposes that they work together, saying his intention is to capture Borz, interrogate him privately for an hour, then turn him over to the CIA. Annie refuses and is eventually able to locate Borz on her own, but in the ensuing struggle she has another attack and passes out. McQuaid takes and questions Borz and his doctor treats Annie; she tells him she has a heart condition and McQuaid agrees to keep her secret. Now cooperating as he proposed, they prepare to drive Borz over the border into Colombia. Meanwhile, Arthur's first day of work includes a dinner meeting with McQuaid's deputy Caitlyn Cook, and Auggie's debriefing by Hayley Price, a member of the National Counterterrorism Center, leads to a romantic encounter that evening.
62	3	"Unseen Power of the Picket Fence"	Stephen Kay	Tamara Becher-Wilkinson	July 8, 2014	CA503	1.44
When their first attempt to leave Venezuela fails, Annie and McQuaid separate from his men and take Borz to Caracas, where he dies in spite of McQuaid's valiant attempts at medical treatment. Annie gets a chance to question Borz first, and by claiming to be able to help his sister (actually dead by Annie's hand) she learns that he met in Washington with someone called "the Postman". Auggie asks an eccentric ex-CIA operative, Roger Bennett, for help in finding this Postman and Bennett reports some results. Caitlyn arranges for Annie and McQuaid to leave Venezuela, and on their return Annie receives a new handgun as a present from McQuaid. Meanwhile, Hayley disclaims any intention to continue having sex with Auggie, but contrives an excuse to visit him and do so. Calder is frustrated with his new administrative responsibilities, and confides this to the prostitute he is regularly seeing.
63	4	"Silence Kit"	Félix Alcalá	Zak Schwartz	July 15, 2014	CA504	1.52
Auggie learns that the Chicago bombers bought their inside information from an NSA employee named Wilson who lives in Washington. Annie is injured in a car accident and hospitalized, where doctors find evidence of her heart condition. She sets out after Wilson on what she believes will be her last night as a CIA field operative, while Senator Pierson receives an award at a gala party. Annie finally tells Auggie about the heart condition, revealing that she went to Eyal to get it diagnosed without the CIA's knowledge. Annie breaks into the office of Wilson's psychotherapist, learns that he is having an affair, and unsuccessfully attempts to use this information to turn Wilson's wife against him. Returning home in despair, she is attacked by Wilson and kills him with her new gun. Evidence then found at Wilson's house prevents an attack on another CIA facility and suggests that the money for the Chicago information came from someone in Paris. Meanwhile, at the party, Arthur convinces Pierson to give a lucrative contract to McQuaid Security, and Joan discovers Calder's secret relationship and urges him to end it. The next day, Annie discovers that Auggie has altered her medical records, so that they can continue to work together.
64	5	"Elevate Me Later"	Jamie Barber	Karen Campbell	July 22, 2014	CA505	1.70
Auggie and Annie travel to Paris, where Auggie is to get his old hacker friend Natasha (from season 1) to build a software key that will allow them to break into the computer of an ex-FSB man, Ivan Kravec, who is connected to the Chicago bombing. Natasha agrees in return for the FBI dropping the charges that make her unable to travel freely in the US. She builds the key, but the FBI denies Calder's request to clear her. Auggie tells Natasha this against Annie's advice, having vowed to be honest with her. They have sex, and Auggie awakes to find that Annie has stolen the key and used it to complete the mission, drugging Kravec in such a way to make him believe they had a night of rough sex. The bank data from Kravec' computer shows that he paid for the Chicago bombing. Auggie is crushed that Annie betrayed his trust; Annie tells Natasha that she alone was responsible, and Natasha later appears at Auggie's home in DC. Meanwhile, Arthur and Caitlyn visit Iraq and make a sale, and each impresses the other with their bravery when their convoy is attacked.
65	6	"Embassy Row"	Jamie Barber	Henry Alonso Myers	July 29, 2014	CA506	1.66
Annie flies to Paris, where Kravec is planning a big meeting. He invites her to a party at the Russian embassy; Auggie and his techs disable the computer systems so she will not be recognized by fingerprint or face. But Kravec, not fooled by his earlier encounter, forcibly drugs Annie and puts her in a car trunk planning to take her to Moscow. McQuaid, who was attending the same party intending (he says) to buy Russian helicopters for the DIA, follows and rescues her, also wounding and capturing Kravec for interrogation. Asked again by Annie about his private interview with Borz, he says that he has a mole in his company who is selling secrets, but that Borz was no help in his investigation. In DC, Auggie harbors Natasha and plans to break up with Hayley, but the latter's investigation is turning toward Annie and he decides to continue dating her to monitor it. The same investigation turns up a driver's license for Calder's paramour in her apparent real name, Stephanie Banks. Calder confirms his trust in her and is then told that she was just part of a random check of the attendees at gala. Joan asks Auggie for information on Arthur's trip and learns that he was in serious danger in Iraq. She tells Arthur this and they mutually bemoan their situation. Joan then asks Calder to bring Arthur into Langley as an outside consultant on Russian intelligence.
66	7	"Brink of the Clouds"	Félix Alcalá	Hayley Tyler	August 5, 2014	CA507	1.64
Kravec tells interrogators that he handled the finances of the Chicago bombing for the reclusive terrorist Farouk Al-Tabrizi, who is actually rogue former CIA agent Nathan Mueller, who worked with Auggie before going off the grid several years ago. Kravec sent a courier with cash cards to find him in Azerbaijan, and Annie follows along with McQuaid and two of his men. With the help of a local warlord, they find Mueller's base. Since it is too strong to attack, Calder orders a drone strike to destroy it. Annie and her team are captured and brought inside the base, but are able to escape before the missiles hit. She is grateful to McQuaid, who helped her with another attack during the mission and assures her that she is not in danger of similarly going rogue. In DC, Hayley tells Auggie that she knows about Annie's condition, but he convinces her to at least delay reporting it. Natasha is going out against Auggie's wishes, and observes his date with Hayley by hacking a traffic camera. When he declines to abandon the CIA and run off with her, she leaves, but not before Hayley sees them together. Stephanie is arrested with a Russian client; Calder gets her released and then breaks off with her, but this keeps him away from Langley at a crucial time and earns him a rebuke from Joan. Bennett tells Auggie he has important further information about Mueller.
67	8	"Grounded"	Larysa Kondracki	Hank Chilton	August 12, 2014	CA508	1.62
Hayley reports Annie's heart condition to Calder, who removes Annie from field work, and to her superiors, who become suspicious about the entire CIA investigation of the bombing. Bennett tells Auggie and Annie that Kravec (now back in Russia after a spy trade) lied about Mueller being his backer. For $100K, Bennett says, a source in the Russian embassy will give him files revealing the truth. Annie gets the money from McQuaid, who conceals its destination from Caitlyn, and takes it to Bennett's apartment. There she is disturbed when Bennett lashes out at an unfamiliar man in the hallway. Summoned along with Calder and Joan to a meeting with the deputy Director of National Intelligence, Annie leaves the building to answer a frantic call from Bennett asking her to meet him at a distant train station. McQuaid takes her there in his helicopter, but they find Bennett dead, hit by a car and leaving a briefcase filled with documents about conspiracy theories. Calder is nearly replaced, and Joan suspends Annie from duty. Later she tells Arthur that she is worried that the CIA will find out what happened several years ago in the Balkans. Annie visits McQuaid at his house, and after a pleasant overnight conversation they are interrupted, Annie by a phone call from Auggie (who suspects that Bennett was framed and killed), and McQuaid by a visitor (the dog walker from Bennett's hallway).
68	9	"Spit on a Stranger"	Emile Levisetti	Joseph Sousa	August 19, 2014	CA509	1.63
Having learned with Auggie that the dog walker is a former McQuaid employee, Annie resigns from the CIA and takes up McQuaid's offer of a job. With Auggie's help she is soon able to copy the files on McQuaid's computer, and they find that several former McQuaid employees including Borz are part of an organization called "Flint". McQuaid then tells Annie, before being asked, that Flint does covert operations for the DoD outside of McQuaid's main company. Arthur is able to more or less verify this for Annie, and also provide an address linked to Flint. There Annie finds a deserted factory, and as she begins to investigate a basement she is met by Caitlyn, who says she followed her there to protect the company from her spying. They both go downstairs where they are attacked by two men; Caitlyn kills one and the other escapes. Arthur, Caitlyn, and Annie then examine the basement, find signs of a recent explosion, and conclude that it was used to plan the Chicago bombing. They tell Calder and Joan, who order McQuaid's arrest. That night McQuaid comes to Annie's apartment, tipped off about the manhunt. Held at gunpoint by Annie, he tells her to trust her instincts and either shoot him or let him go. She chooses the latter, and then lies to Auggie about having seen him. Calder learns that Auggie falsified Annie's medical records, but declines to pursue the matter after Auggie and Annie's suspicions are vindicated.
69	10	"Sensitive Euro Man"	Larysa Kondracki	Tamara Becher-Wilkinson	August 26, 2014	CA510	1.79
With Ryan a fugitive, Arthur and Caitlyn attempt to carry out McQuaid Security's last contract, providing security for the signing of a treaty negotiated by US-educated Georgian diplomat Aleksandre Belenko. Caitlyn opens the firm to the CIA's investigation of Ryan, but hides Ryan's personal laptop. Annie meets with Ryan in the National Arboretum, then provides overwatch with a sniper rifle from a distance while Ryan conducts a meet with Caitlyn. She gives him the laptop, in which Ryan discovers a GPS tracking device set to transmit once he turns it on. Ryan and Annie go to the former's well-prepared safe house, where they have sex and then turn on the laptop. Three assassins soon arrive and are easily overpowered. They have brought material which Annie realizes is meant to frame Ryan for a bomb attack on the treaty signing. She tells Auggie to have the hotel evacuated and they both go there. Annie is stopped by Hayley, who tries to arrest Annie by herself despite having been denied the requisite authority to do so. Annie eventually convinces her enough to help stop the motorcade, where one of the cars contains the bomb. Ryan enters the building and confronts Caitlyn, who shoots him. Annie then finds Caitlyn in the parking garage; they fight, but Belenko arrives and shoots Caitlyn dead before Annie can capture her. Belenko returns to Georgia, telling someone on the phone that his plans in Istanbul will continue without Caitlyn's help. Ryan is hospitalized, and Auggie and Hayley agree to a truce as she leaves for a new job. Meanwhile, Calder asks his former paramour for help in getting information from her Russian embassy client, after Joan's embassy asset proves uncooperative.
70	11	"Trigger Cut"	Stephen Kay	Stephen Hootstein	November 6, 2014	CA511	1.22
Arthur learns from Caitlin's diary that she planned to meet someone called "Q" in Istanbul, so Annie leaves Ryan's bedside to go there. She finds one of Belenko's men meeting with a Syrian named Mahmoud Qabbani, an arms dealer wanted dead by Mossad. Annie confronts Qabbani at a bathhouse, but Eyal arrives and kills him just as he was about to tell her what Belenko was buying from him. Eyal reluctantly decides to delay his departure to help her try to figure out and stop whatever Belenko is planning, but they lose sight of the weapons package. She returns to Washington, where Ryan has regained consciousness. Also at the hospital is Auggie, whose old friend Tony appears to have died of alcohol poisoning, after being fired from his State Department job for leaking Belenko's travel plans to help Auggie find him. Calder's paramour Sydney/Stephanie agrees to help the CIA compromise the phone of her Russian embassy client, declining the promised payment after she succeeds and inviting Calder to use her real name.
71	12	"Starlings of the Slipstream"	Christopher Gorham	Karen Campbell	November 13, 2014	CA512	1.13
Auggie is arrested after arguing with the medical examiner about Tony. When Annie bails him out, he tells her that he thinks Belenko is systematically murdering members of his old Army unit -- one was in Chicago and another, Tony, may have been the target of the treaty bombing. Annie breaks into Tony's apartment and finds out that he was killed with a sophisticated synthetic poison. Only a few labs could make it, including one in Essen where Belenko recently visited. Annie flies there and finds a chemist who is being watched by Olga, an experienced FSB assassin whom Annie and Eyal encountered in Istanbul. She rescues the chemist, who tells her that she was Belenko's lover but commits suicide with the same poison before telling her more. Annie is arrested for the crime and taken away by Olga, who claims to be an Interpol agent. After Annie fails to escape, Olga frees her and says that they are on the same side. In DC, Calder asks Stephanie to intensify her contact with the Russian embassy man, who is better connected than they realized. Ryan gives the suspended Auggie a new computer and has one of his men stay with him for protection. Joan is polygraphed by the CIA and asked about the Balkans, but Arthur's contacts tell him this was merely preparation for a job offer to Joan. Two men break into Auggie's apartment, overpower him, and take him away in a car.
72	13	"She Believes"	Christine Moore	Hayley Tyler	November 20, 2014	CA513	1.35
Ryan discovers that Auggie and his bodyguard Pete are missing, and the CIA trace them to Baltimore harbor, where they find Pete dead and determine that Auggie has been taken away on a ship. Olga tells Annie that she is an FSB agent seeking private revenge on Belenko, who killed her husband. She suggests that they cooperate to kill him, but once Annie is aware of Auggie's plight she insists that they capture him instead. They are able to capture and begin torturing him, and learn that Auggie is still alive, but his men follow a tracking device in his mouth and soon free him; Olga is killed. Calder and Joan grab Mashkov, the Russian embassy officer, off the street and threaten to expose him as having given secrets to Sydney unless he gives them all the FSB files on Belenko. They learn that Belenko is not actually from Georgia but from Chechnya, where Auggie's unit once served. Auggie is taken to Chechnya and brought before Belenko, who says Auggie has something he wants. Ryan and Annie leave together to attempt to rescue him, with a promise of the CIA's full backing from Calder and Joan.
73	14	"Transport is Arranged"	Emile Levisetti	Henry Alonso Myers	December 4, 2014	CA514	1.38
In 2005, Auggie's special ops unit participate in a prisoner exchange with Chechen rebels in Grozny which ends in a shootout. Auggie's teammate Jim Deckard (Kenny Johnson), posing as one of the Chechens, kills the Chechen prisoner to save Auggie and then disappears. In the present, Belenko tortures Auggie in the same building, saying that the dead prisoner was his brother, and asking Auggie where Deckard is. Auggie holds out until Belenko also tortures Natasha, whom he grabbed off the street in Budapest. Just as Auggie is about to talk, Annie and Ryan begin their attack on the building. Belenko leaves, securing his escape by claiming to have a deadman switch that will destroy the building. He does destroy the building, but Auggie and Natasha escape. Auggie says that they must find Deckard before Belenko does. Meanwhile, just as Calder calls to postpone his first non-commercial date with Sydney, a man comes to her door and shoots her.
74	15	"Frontwards"	Stephen Kay	Stephen Hootstein	December 11, 2014	CA515	1.31
Auggie, Annie, and Ryan travel to Deckard's last known address in Buenos Aires and find that he is in jail over an unrelated matter. They soon learn that they are being pursued by a squad of special Argentine police, bribed by Belenko and using a tracker that Belenko planted on Auggie. In Washington, Calder beats Mashkov and questions him about the shooting of Sydney (who is alive but not at all well); he blames Belenko and the CIA confirm that Belenko's man Langer did it. Calder joins a team going after Langer, who has been seen in West Virginia. Meeting with an FSB official to apologize for the beating, Joan learns that the FSB now want Belenko dead. She asks Annie to take him alive if possible. Ryan gets arrested in order to break Deckard out of the jail, succeeding just as Belenko arrives. The CIA extract Auggie and Deckard while Annie and Ryan remain and capture Belenko. Fleeing with him through the city, they discover the entire police squad lying in the street, killed execution-style. Belenko interprets this as a message that the FSB indeed want him dead.
75	16	"Gold Soundz"	Stephen Kay	Matt Corman & Chris Ord	December 18, 2014	CA516	1.59
Langer evades Calder's team and travels to DC, where he kills and impersonates a low-level CIA employee and enters the Langley headquarters. Annie and Ryan, with active assistance from Belenko, eventually defeat an elite team of Russian assassins in a gun battle at the La Recoleta Cemetery. During the fight and again afterward, Ryan asks Annie to marry him. Langer locks Auggie and Deckard in an interrogation room and releases a poisonous gas, but Calder rescues them, shooting Langer and thus avenging the attack on Sydney (who is still unconscious). A political operative asks Arthur to run for the U.S. Senate, arranging to declassify the true story of his resignation from the CIA. Joan is placed in charge of a new special task force, and gets permission to reinstate Annie as a CIA agent in spite of her heart condition. Auggie later reveals to Annie that he is leaving the CIA to travel the world with Natasha, who has received full immunity. Auggie helps Annie make an important decision.

== Home video releases ==
Season	Episodes	DVD release dates			
Season	Episodes	Region 1	Region 2	Region 4	Discs
1	11	May 17, 2011	June 18, 2012	June 2, 2011	3
2	16	May 1, 2012	September 17, 2012	October 3, 2012	4
3	16	May 28, 2013	March 17, 2014	September 5, 2013	4
4	16	May 27, 2014	August 10, 2015	TBA	4
5	16	April 28, 2015	TBA	TBA	4
Total	75	TBA	TBA	TBA	TBA
