= List of science fiction television programs, 0–9 =

This is an inclusive list of science fiction television programs whose names begin with the numbers 0 through 9.

== 0-9 ==
Title	Year	Country	Format/type	Genre	Notes
009-1	2006	Japan	animated	children/young-adult, cyborgs/robots	
The 100	2014–2020	USA		post-apocalyptic	
12 Monkeys	2015–2018	USA		time travel	
1990	1977–1978	UK		life in the future	
2030 CE	2002	Canada		children/young-adult, life in the future	
3%	2016–2020	Brazil			
3rd Rock from the Sun	1996–2001	US		aliens on earth, satire/comedy	
The 4400	2004–2007	US		superbeings	
4400	2021–2022	US			
5ive Days to Midnight (a.k.a. Five Days to Midnight)	2004	US	miniseries	time travel	
