= Romy Rosemont =

American actress (born 1964)

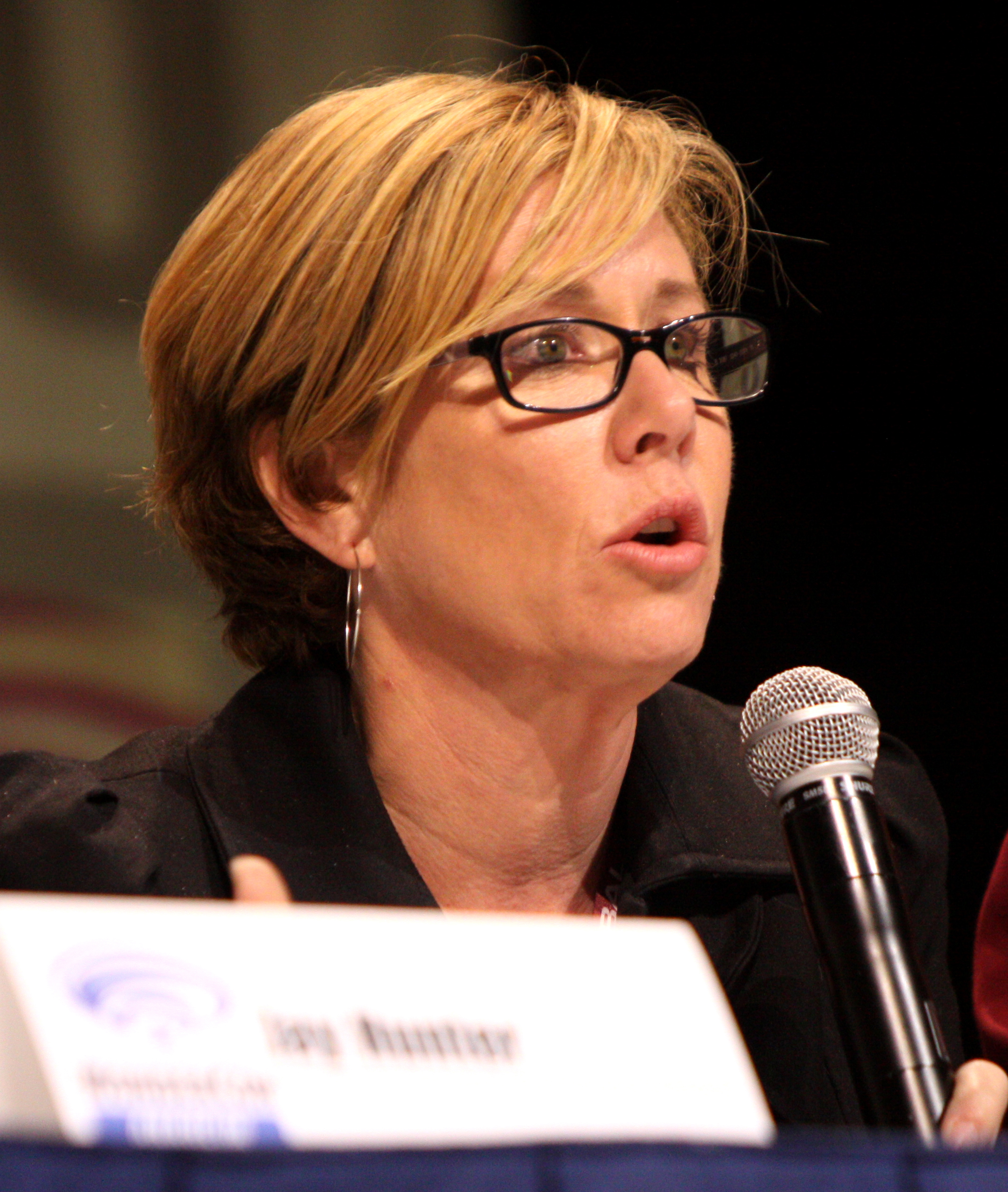
- Rosemont at WonderCon in Anaheim, California on March 31, 2013
- Born: October 28, 1964 (age 61); United States
- Education: Northwestern University
- Occupation: Actress
- Years active: 1988–present
- Spouse: Stephen Root (m. 2008)

Romy Rosemont (born October 28, 1964) is an American actress, who has appeared in multiple television series, including Shark, Grey's Anatomy, CSI: Crime Scene Investigation, Prison Break, and Private Practice. She got her break in 2010, playing Carole Hudson in the musical series Glee. Rosemont is married to fellow actor Stephen Root; the couple appeared on-screen together in a fourth-season episode of Fringe titled "And Those We've Left Behind".

== Career ==
Rosemont is a graduate of Northwestern University. Rosemont has had guest and recurring roles in various television series, including alongside James Woods and Danielle Panabaker in Shark, as well as in Cook-Off!, Boston Legal, Crossing Jordan, Friends with Money, Back to You and Me, Close to Home, Grey's Anatomy, Friends, Shopgirl, Ghost Whisperer, CSI: Crime Scene Investigation, Prison Break, Castle and Drop Dead Diva. She played Lizzie Sparks in episode 16, season 6 of the TV show Criminal Minds.

As of 2009, Rosemont has appeared in musical comedy-drama Glee as recurring character Carole Hudson, the on-screen mother of Finn Hudson, played by Cory Monteith. In an interview in April 2011, she was enthusiastic about continuing her role in the series, saying "It's a great storyline, and it's going further, but there are so many people to accommodate. But hopefully these characters will grow and even the public and whatever will want to see more of them, so hopefully that will be it." In 2014, she appeared in three episodes of The Fosters.

In 2019, Romy starred as mother “Sharon Vickers” in the Canadian made-for-tv film, ‘Mad Mom’ (also known as: ‘Psycho Mother-In-Law’) alongside Kari Matchett & Victoria Diamond. ‘Mad Mom’ was a psychological thriller, directed by Jean-François Rivard .

== Personal life ==
Rosemont has been married to actor Stephen Root since December 14, 2008. They both appeared in a 2011 episode of Fringe and a 2016 episode of Masters of Sex. The couple were due to appear on-screen together in the 2011 horror film Red State, but Rosemont was forced to pull out due to a scheduling conflict with Glee.

== Filmography ==
=== Film ===
Year	Title	Role	Notes
1988	Bad Dreams	Nurse #3	
1988	Dangerous Love	Platt Receptionist	
1990	The Ticket Outta Here	Romy	
1990	The End of Innocence	Waitress	
1991	Driving Me Crazy	Receptionist	
1991	Another You	Dental Assistant	
1993	My Life	Anya Stasiuk	
1995	Congo	Assistant	
1999	The Bachelor	Rita	
2000	Whatever It Takes	Cosmo's Date	
2000	I'll Wave Back	John's mother	
2001	See Jane Run	Road Rage Woman	
2001	Lovely and Amazing	Dr. Debbie Waldman	
2002	Zig Zag	Sara	
2003	Soul Mates	Nurse	Short film
2004	The Seat Filler	Vicki	
2005	Shopgirl	Loan Officer	
2005	Blue Moon	Gina	Short film
2006	Friends with Money	Gretchen	
2006	The Frank Anderson	Dr. Julia Seales	Short film
2007	An American Crime	Betty Likens	
2009	Bob Funk	Ruthie	
2009	What We Became	Joanie Franklin	Short film
2010	Please Give		
2011	Beverly Hills Chihuahua 2	Min Pin Dog (voice)	Direct-to-Video
2011	Kung Fu Panda 2	Pig Mother (voice)	
2012	The Avengers	Shawna Lynde	
2012	Little Women, Big Cars	Connie	
2012	Much Ado About Nothing	The Sexton	
2013	Kings and Beggars	Kate	Short film
2015	Martyrs	Mom	
2016	Miles	Marge Carlson	
2016	Those Eyes	Mother	Short film
2017	Cook Off!	Patty Pasternak	
2017	Different Flowers	Mama Haven	
2018	Nostalgia	Mrs. Singer	
2018	Homecoming	Mom	Short film

=== Television ===
Year	Title	Role	Notes
1990	Murphy Brown	Nurse Healy	Episode: "The Bitch's Back"
1991	Long Road Home	Waitress	TV movie
1991	Shadow of a Doubt	Waitress	TV movie
1991	Veronica Clare	Secretary	Episode: "Slow Violence"
1991	Sibs	Susan	Episode: "The Naked and the Damned"
1992	Intruders	Neil's Daughter	Miniseries
1992	Harry and the Hendersons	Linda	Episode: "Skin Deep"
1993	The Adventures of Brisco County, Jr.	Sally Dane	Episode: "Mail Order Brides"
1993	Harmful Intent	Monica Carver	TV movie
1994	Limboland	Various	Episode: "Pilot"
1994	Trick of the Eye	Cathy Newman	TV movie
1994	On Our Own	Nancy Fuller	Episode: "Baby Blues"
1995	Roseanne	Margaret D.	Episode: "My Name Is Bev"
1995	The Watcher		Episode: "A Change of Heart"
1995	Thunder Alley	Mrs. Duffy	Episode: "Just a Vacation"
1995	Melrose Place		Episode: "Kiss, Kiss Bang, Bang"
1996	ER	Joanne Barris	Episode: "Fevers of Unknown Origin"
1996	What Love Sees	Lucy Treadway	TV movie
1996	Ellen	The Woman	Episode: "The Bubble Gum Incident"
1996	Friends	Troop Leader	Episode: "The One Where Rachel Quits"
1998	Suddenly Susan	Lynnette	Episode: "Pucker Up"
1998	Sleepwakers	Detective Fusco/Vuscow	2 episodes
1998	Babylon 5	Publicist	Episode: "Sleeping in Light"
1999	The Rockford Files: If It Bleeds... It Leads	Mrs. Disarcina	TV movie
1999	Time of Your Life	Mollie	Episode: "The Time She Got Mobbed"
1999	Touched by an Angel	Diane 'Dee Dee' Mangione	Episode: "Family Business"
2000	Profiler	Alice	Episode: "Mea Culpa"
2000	For All Time	Tracy	TV movie
2001	Any Day Now		Episode: "Don't Tell Me It's Not About Frankie"
2001	The Chronicle	Reba	Episode: "Baby Got Back"
2001	Dharma & Greg	Martha	Episode: "With a Little Help from My Friend"
2002	Ally McBeal	Marie Hall	Episode: "One Hundred Tears"
2002	Six Feet Under	Professor	Episode: "The Plan"
2002	Door to Door	Rhoda	TV movie
2002	John Doe	Mrs. Nichols	Episode: "Pilot"
2002	Touched by an Angel	Gwen Gold	Episode: "The Sixteenth Minute"
2002	Strong Medicine	Isobel	Episode: "Family History"
2002	MDs	Melora	Episode: "Wing and a Prayer"
2002–2005	CSI: Crime Scene Investigation	Jacqui Franco	Recurring
2003	The Brotherhood of Poland, New Hampshire	Andrea Morris	Episode: "Little Girl Lost"
2004	Without a Trace	Karen Miller	Episode: "Wannabe"
2004	7th Heaven	Sally Fleming	Episode: "Two Weddings, an Engagement and a Funeral"
2004	Oliver Beene	Mrs. Martinelli	Episode: "Ward Have Mercy"
2004	Nip/Tuck	Libby Zucker	Episode: "Erica Noughton"
2004	King of the Hill	Margo (voice)	Episode: "Ceci N'est Pas Une King of the Hill"
2005	Medium	Jury Consultant	Episode: "Suspicions and Certainties"
2005	Back to You and Me	Cheryl	TV movie
2005	Grey's Anatomy	Lea Seibert	Episode: "Enough Is Enough"
2005	Close to Home	Detective Williams	Episode: "Baseball Murder"
2006	Crossing Jordan	Allison Cohen	Episode: "Death Toll"
2006	Boston Legal	Stephanie Beller	Episode: "Word Salad Days"
2006	Shark	Margaret Pool	Episode: "Pilot"
2006	Prison Break	Detective Kathryn Slattery	2 episodes
2007	Help Me Help You	Ruth Weiner	Uncredited; Episode: "Boxer"
2007	Dirt	Rema Saunders	Episode: "Ovophagy"
2007	Brothers & Sisters	The Counselor	2 episodes
2007	State of Mind	Louise	Episode: "Pilot"
2008	Head Case	Principal	Episode: "Good Vibes"
2008	Swingtown	Dr. Gardner	2 episodes
2008	The Oaks	Molly	TV Pilot
2009	Ghost Whisperer	Gail Dwight	Episode: "Slow Burn"
2009	Trust Me		Episode: "You Got Chocolate in My Peanut Butter"
2009	Raising the Bar	Barbara Goslin	Episode: "Hair Apparent"
2009	Glee: Director's Cut Pilot Episode	Carole Hudson	Re-cut episode
2009	Eastwick	Elise Dunn	Episode: "Mooning and Crooning"
2009–2015	Glee	Carole Hudson-Hummel	Recurring, 18 episodes
2010	King of the Hill	Additional voices	Episode: "The Honeymooners"
2010	Hawthorne	Jo Ellen Paxton	Episode: "The Starting Line"
2010	Private Practice	Jackie	Episode: "A Better Place to Be"
2011	Criminal Minds	Lizzie Sparks	Episode: "Coda"
2011	Mr. Sunshine	Diane	Episode: "Hostile Workplace"
2011	Big Love	Monica Swanson	Episode: "Exorcism"
2011	In Plain Sight	Dr. Wolk	Episode: "I'm a Liver Not a Fighter"
2011	Drop Dead Diva	Molly Haller	Episode: "Dream Big"
2011	Five	Lynne	TV movie
2011	Harry's Law	Mrs. Wells	Episode: "Queen of Snark"
2011	Fringe	Kate	Episode: "And Those We've Left Behind"
2011	Paul the Male Matchmaker	Daphne	2 episodes
2012	A Taste of Romance	Patsy Danvers	TV movie
2012	Drew Peterson: Untouchable	Sofia	TV movie
2012	CSI: Miami	Amy Burton	Episode: "Terminal Velocity"
2012	Law & Order: Special Victims Unit	Professor Kathleen Dobson	Episode: "Twenty-Five Acts"
2012	Up All Night	Joan	Episode: "I Can't Quit You"
2012	Downwardly Mobile	Sheila	TV Pilot
2013	Justified	Sonya Gables	2 episodes
2013	Castle	Nurse Lockhart	Episode: "Scared to Death"
2013	The Spirit Seeker	Eva McDowall	TV short
2013	We Are Men	Carter's Mom	Episode: "Pilot"
2014	House of Lies	Psychiatrist	Episode: "Soldiers"
2014	The Fosters	Amanda Rogers	4 episodes
2014	Hot in Cleveland	Marcie	Episode: "The Bachelors"
2014	The League	Jenny's Doctor	Episode: "The Heavenly Fouler"
2015	Grimm	Beverly Bennett	Episode: "Bad Luck"
2015	Resident Advisors	Dean Berber	Recurring
2015	Silicon Valley	Molly Kendall	2 episodes
2015	Scandal	Patty Snell	2 episodes
2015	Major Crimes	Carrie Gillan	Episode: "The Jumping Off Point"
2016	Masters of Sex	Marcia Toplin	Episode: "Topeka"
2016	Secrets and Lies	Belinda Peterson	3 episodes
2016	American Crime Story	Jill Shively	2 episodes
2017	A Moving Romance	Georgia	TV movie
2017	Doubt	Connie Hollander	Episode: "Faith"
2017–2018	Beyond	Diane Matthews	Main cast
2018	How to Get Away with Murder	Vera Dewitt	Episode: "He's Dead"
2018	Brooklyn Nine-Nine	Elaine Nixon	Episode: "The Box"
2018	Code Black	Dolores	Episode: "The Business of Saving Lives"
2018	Borderline Talent	Maude	Miniseries; 1 episode
2018	Angie Tribeca	Marmaduke	Episode: "Heading to the Legal Beagle"
2018	Mad Mom	Sharon Vickers	TV movie
2018–2022	A Million Little Things	Shelley	9 episodes
2018–2024	9-1-1	Lola Peterson	5 episodes
2019	The Morning Show	Sheila Lutkin	Episode: "Open Waters"
2021	Grown-ish	Chancellor Mitchell	2 episodes
2021	You	Detective Ruthie Falco	2 episodes
2021–2022	Big Sky	Agatha	Recurring
2024	The Pradeeps of Pittsburgh	Light Suit	Recurring
