= Exeter (film) =

- Theatrical film poster
- Directed by: Marcus Nispel
- Screenplay by: Kirsten McCallion
- Story by: Marcus Nispel
- Produced by: Brandt Andersen; Michael Corrente; Michael Corso; Marcus Nispel; Trent Othick
- Starring: Kelly Blatz; Brittany Curran; Brett Dier; Gage Golightly; Stephen Lang
- Cinematography: Eric Treml
- Edited by: Blake Maniquis
- Music by: Eric Allaman
- Production companies: Blumhouse Productions; Bloodline Productions; GO Productions; Prescience and Row Productions; Shallow Focus; Vicarious Entertainment
- Distributed by: Viva Pictures
- Release dates: February 27, 2015 (Glasgow Film Festival); July 2, 2015 (United States)
- Running time: 91 minutes
- Country: United States
- Language: English
- Box office: $291,097

Exeter (titled The Asylum in the UK) is a 2015 American supernatural horror film directed by Marcus Nispel. The screenplay by Kirsten McCallion is from a story by Nispel. It stars Stephen Lang, Kelly Blatz, Brittany Curran, Brett Dier and Gage Golightly. Jason Blum serves as an executive producer through his Blumhouse Productions banner. The film premiered at the Glasgow Horror Film Festival on February 27, 2015. The film was released on July 2, 2015, on DirecTV Cinema.

== Plot ==
After shooting up heroin, a woman commits suicide. Clips show the history of the Exeter School of the Feeble Minded. These document its abuses toward its patients, demise, and eventual abandonment. Years later, Patrick volunteers to help Father Conway renovate the site. Conway, who is disappointed that Patrick has not applied for college, believes that God has a special plan for him. After talking to local junk man Greer, Conway and Patrick leave for the weekend.

When Patrick's friends discover the site will be unsupervised for the weekend, they organize a huge party there over Patrick's objections. As the party winds down, seven people remain: Patrick, his younger brother Rory, Brian, Brad, Amber, Drew, and Reign, a girl that Patrick has met at the party. After they discuss the site's troubled history and its potential for supernatural phenomena, Amber convinces the others to attempt to levitate Rory. Amber says it worked, but the others dismiss it as a prank by Rory, who they say is attention-starved. Embarrassed that he peed his pants, Rory runs off.

When Patrick and Reign encounter Rory later, they become convinced that he is possessed, as he is speaking in tongues and viciously attacking anyone who approaches him. After restraining him, Reign convinces Patrick to call Father Conway for help. The others react angrily, as they have been ingesting a variety of illegal drugs. As they argue, Greer returns and threatens to call the cops unless Amber has sex with him. Greer hears a sound from upstairs and investigates, only to be killed by Rory. Brian and Amber panic, and as they flee Exeter, they accidentally strike Father Conway with their car, apparently killing him. The car does not make it off the grounds.

As the teens debate what to do next, Exeter's security system locks them in. Having two dead bodies and a pile of drugs, the teens agree to resolve the situation themselves. Using their cell phones, they find a do-it-yourself exorcism guide and perform it on Rory. Although it initially seems to have succeeded, Rory reverts to his possessed self. Looking for clues to help them, Reign and Patrick discover video tapes of a troubled teen at Exeter, Devon, who is apparently Conway's child. A message written in blood on one of the ceilings demands that the teens speak to the entity, so they carve out a Ouija board. The entity identifies itself as Devon and demands they save it from a box, where it is trapped.

Rory recovers from his possession and does not remember anything. At the same time, Amber shows signs of possession. She kills Drew before the others drive her off. Brad, frustrated by the attacks, arms himself with a pickax and looks for Amber. He is surprised when he sees Father Conway, trips, and accidentally impales himself. Reign and Patrick go after Amber while Rory and Brian guard the downstairs area. Rory leaves to urinate, and Amber attacks Brian. After killing Amber, Patrick and Reign find Rory, who says that Conway trapped him in a box for his own protection. The group encounter Brian, who is now possessed; Patrick kills Brian after he attacks them.

Reign insists that Conway is responsible for the events and says that he has invoked the evil spirits. Rory, too, is doubtful of Conway's motives. Patrick says that Conway would never hurt anyone. When they find the security system, they disable the lock down, and Patrick forces Rory to flee to safety. After seeing Conway kill Reign, Patrick angrily confronts him. When Conway denies having a son, Patrick sets him afire, killing him.

Reign suddenly rises and explains that she is Conway's daughter, Devon. Conway abandoned Devon and her mother, and after Devon's mother committed suicide, Conway hid Devon at Exeter. Feeling abandoned, Devon swore revenge on Conway and the people he cares about. She engineered the whole situation so that Patrick would kill Conway. After a fight, Patrick traps her in a box as Exeter burns. Later, two cops investigate the ruined site, only to find the box empty.

== Cast ==
- Kelly Blatz as Patrick
- Brittany Curran as Reign/Devon
- Brett Dier as Brad
- Gage Golightly as Amber
- Nick Nicotera as Brian Knowles
- Nick Nordella as Drew
- Michael Ormsby as Rory
- Kevin Chapman as Greer
- Stephen Lang as Father Conway

== Development ==
The film was first announced as Backmask on May 9, 2011. The first images from the set were revealed on June 18, 2012. The screenplay is written by Kirsten McCallion, and the make-up effects were carried out by Shaun Smith. Most of the main casting announcements were made on June 1, 2012. Shooting took place on location in Rhode Island. Nispel said that the location was photographed as they found it. Nispel said that he wanted to write the film as if the teens who watch horror films experienced one.

== Release ==
On December 10, 2014, Dread Central reported that the title had been changed from Backmask to Exeter. It was released as The Asylum in the UK on May 4, 2015. DirecTV Cinema premiered it in the US on July 2, 2015.

== Reception ==
Gareth Jones of Dread Central rated it 3/5 stars and wrote, "The Asylum is a peculiar experience; a definite oddity that seems only ever a moment away from completely falling apart. But it isn't actually a bad one." Pat Torfe of Bloody Disgusting rated it 3/5 stars and called it "one of those films where you turn your brain off and just let it play and enjoy it".
