= Heartland (2007 American TV series) =

American medical drama television series

- Genre: Medical drama
- Created by: David Hollander
- Starring: Treat Williams; Kari Matchett; Rockmond Dunbar; Chris William Martin; Morena Baccarin; Danielle Nicolet; Gage Golightly; Dabney Coleman; Melinda Dillon
- Composer: W.G. Snuffy Walden
- Country of origin: United States
- Original language: English
- No. of seasons: 1
- No. of episodes: 9

Production
- Executive producer: David Hollander
- Producers: Robert M. Rolsky; Steve Gomer
- Running time: 60 minutes
- Production companies: David Hollander Productions; Warner Horizon Television

Original release
- Network: TNT
- Release: June 18 – August 13, 2007

Heartland is an American medical drama television series that aired on TNT from June 18 to August 31, 2007. It was produced by Warner Horizon Television.

On Monday, July 23, Heartland was moved to its new time beginning at 8:00pm Eastern/7:00pm Central followed by The Closer and the series premiere of Saving Grace.

On Friday, August 31, Heartland was canceled by TNT due to disappointing ratings.

== Summary ==
The series was based in the high-stakes world of heart-transplant surgery at "St. Jude" hospital in Pittsburgh based largely on the transplant center at the University of Pittsburgh Medical Center. It followed a recently separated couple who work both sides of the trade: She convinces the survivors and loved ones to donate the organs of the newly or about to be deceased; he races against time to implant the valuable organs into patients who are struggling against time and their failing bodies to hold on just long enough to receive the life-saving gifts.

== Cast ==
- Treat Williams as Dr. Nathaniel "Nate" Grant
- Danielle Nicolet as Mary Singletary
- Morena Baccarin as Nurse Jessica Kivala
- Kari Matchett as Kate Armstrong
- Gage Golightly as Thea Grant
- Rockmond Dunbar as Dr. Tom Jonas
- Chris William Martin as Dr. Simon Griffith
- Dabney Coleman as Dr. Bart Jacobs
- Melinda Dillon as Janet Jacobs

== Episodes ==
No.	Title	Directed by	Written by	Original release date	Viewers (millions)
1	"Pilot"	David Hollander	David Hollander	June 18, 2007	4.3
2	"I Make Myself Into Something New"	Steve Gomer	David Hollander	June 25, 2007	3.0
3	"Picking Up Little Things"	Bill Norton	David Hollander & Julie Siege	July 2, 2007	3.4
4	"Mother & Child Reunion"	Lesli Linka Glatter	David Hollander & Annie Weisman	July 9, 2007	N/A
5	"The Place You'll Go"	Milan Cheylov	Noah Baylin, David Kashkooli & David Hollander	July 16, 2007	N/A
6	"Domino Effect"	David Paymer	David Hollander & Julie Siege	July 23, 2007	N/A
7	"A Beautiful Day"	Matt Earl Beesley	David Hollander & Annie Weisman	July 30, 2007	N/A
8	"As We So Wonderfully Done With Each Other"	Steve Gomer	David Hollander & Julie Siege	August 6, 2007	N/A
9	"Smile"	David Hollander	David Hollander & Annie Weisman	August 13, 2007	N/A
