= The Long Shot =

- Written by: David Alexander
- Directed by: Georg Stanford Brown
- Starring: Julie Benz; Marsha Mason
- Theme music composer: Mark Watters
- Country of origin: United States
- Original language: English

Production
- Producers: Stephen Bridgewater; Robert Halmi, Jr. Larry Levinson
- Cinematography: Geza Sinkovics (director of photography)
- Editor: Jennifer Jean Cacavas
- Running time: 90 minutes
- Production company: Larry Levinson Productions

Original release
- Network: Hallmark Channel
- Release: April 18, 2004

The Long Shot, sometimes called The Long Shot: Believe in Courage, is a Hallmark Channel film that aired April 18, 2004. It stars Julie Benz and Marsha Mason and centers around a dressage competition.

== Plot summary ==
Annie Garrett (Julie Benz) is a young woman who moves with her slacker husband Ross and their seven-year-old daughter Taylor (Gage Golightly) from Colorado to a ranch in northern California. After he fails to land a job as promised, Ross abandons Annie and Taylor. With nowhere to turn, and their horse to look after, Annie gets a job as a ranch hand and stable person at a stud farm owned by Mary Lou O'Brien (Marsha Mason), a stern woman who is dealing with her own past. Inspired by Mary Lou's encouragement, Annie decides to enter into a dressage competition with her horse she trained herself, Tolo. Unfortunately, Tolo becomes blind and Annie is injured. When she recovers she goes to compete on one of Mary Lou's horses, California Red, but due to an unexpected visit, the horse is unable to compete. In order to compete, she has to believe in herself and have faith in Tolo to win.

== Cast ==
- Julie Benz as Annie Garrett
- Marsha Mason as Mary Lou O'Brian
- Paul Le Mat as Guido Levits
- Gage Golightly as Taylor Garrett, Annie's daughter
- David Alexander as Monte Shelton
- Christopher Cousins as John Oaks
- John Livingston as Ross Garrett, Annie's husband
- Robert Pine as Douglas McCloud
- Laura Johnson as Bonnie McCloud
- Juliette Goglia as Colleen O'Brian, Mary Lou's granddaughter
- Joe Russell as Security Guard

== Promotion ==
Schering-Plough signed on its product Claritin as the network's entitlement sponsor for The Long Shot. This meant that not only did the film's title artwork include the Claritin logo, but the brand would be featured in every promotion and spot regarding the movie's premiere. This made The Long Shot the network's first exclusive entitlement-sponsored film.

== Reception ==
The Long Shot did moderately for the network, premiering with a 1.8 household rating. However, at the time it aired, the movie ranked #1 in average "Length of Tune" over all competitive cable original movies.

== See also ==
- List of films about horses
