= Gone Missing (film) =

- Poster
- Written by: Bryan Dick
- Directed by: Tara Miele
- Country of origin: United States
- Original language: English

Production
- Running time: 90 minutes

Original release
- Release: June 13, 2013

Gone Missing is a 2013 American television film.

== Synopsis ==
Rene's daughter, Kaitlin, and her best friend, Maddy, disappeared from a resort in San Diego during spring break. Dissatisfied with the responses of the authorities, Rene, with the help of her son, Kennedy, and Maddy's mother, Lisa, investigates the case and discovers some disturbing facts about the secret life of one of her missing daughter.

== Cast ==
- Daphne Zuniga as Rene
- Lauren Bowles as Lisa
- Brigette Davidovici as Kaitlin
- Gage Golightly as Maddy
- Nicholas R. Grava as Kennedy
- James Martin Kelly as Officer Benton
- Alejandro Patiño as Martin Guzman
- Brock Harris as Alex
- Hunter Garner as Dylan
- David Stifel as Willie

== Production ==
Gone Missing is one of the first films by Marvista which was produced with cloud storage: the video captured during production was sent directly to a cloud rather than a physical memory as is traditionally done in the current movies.

All of us at MarVista took to Aframe instantly. Ita natural, intuitive, fast and invaluable part of both our production process as well as our post-production workflow ... As a rule our budgets and schedules are efficient by necessity, and leave little room for error. Dedicated digital dailies solutions are out there, but Aframe is more budget-friendly. Aframe rivals major digital dailies solutions feature for feature, and its use costs us a fraction of dedicated solutions – an amazing saving that lets us deploy Aframe throughout our operations.

— Rich Carroll, post-production supervisor at MarVista Entertainment.

== Release ==
The film was first released on Lifetime on June 13, 2013. The world premiere took place on June 15, 2013. It was released on Blu-ray in UK.

== Review ==
Dorothy Rabinowitz reviewing the film for The Wall Street Journal wrote:

A word for "Gone Missing," one in a long line of films about missing teenage daughters and the mothers who go searching for them—in this instance one powered by a fine performance by Daphne Zuniga in the role of a terrified mother. A performance that succeeds in transmitting the force of the harrowing fear, the workings of unbearable imagination that come with such an experience.

Jill O'Rourke for Crushable wrote:

Did you watch the new Lifetime movie Gone Missing last night? If you did, can we please shake hands through the computer and agree that it was the most anticlimactic Lifetime movie ever? We're all in a agreement? Good, now we can get to talking about everything that led up to that enormous letdown.
