= Covert Affairs =

American action drama television series (2010–2014)

- Genre: Action; Drama
- Created by: Matt Corman; Chris Ord
- Starring: Piper Perabo; Christopher Gorham; Kari Matchett; Anne Dudek; Sendhil Ramamurthy; Peter Gallagher; Hill Harper; Nic Bishop
- Opening theme: "Can You Save Me"
- Composers: Toby Chu; Christopher Tyng
- Country of origin: United States
- Original language: English
- No. of seasons: 5
- No. of episodes: 75 (list of episodes)

Production
- Executive producers: Matt Corman Chris Ord James Parriott; Dave Bartis; Doug Liman
- Production locations: Toronto, Ontario, Canada as main; location shooting elsewhere as required
- Cinematography: Colin Hoult; Jamie Barber
- Editors: Lori Jane Coleman; Leon Martin; Chris Brookshire
- Camera setup: Multiple
- Running time: 45 minutes
- Production companies: Universal Cable Productions; Hypnotic; Corman & Ord; Open 4 Business Productions

Original release
- Network: USA Network
- Release: July 13, 2010 – December 18, 2014

Covert Affairs is an American action drama television series filmed in Toronto, Canada, starring Piper Perabo and Christopher Gorham that premiered on Tuesday, July 13, 2010. On January 6, 2015, USA Network canceled Covert Affairs after five seasons.

== Plot overview ==
A young CIA trainee, Annie Walker, is sent to work in the Domestic Protection Division (DPD) as a field agent. August "Auggie" Anderson, a blind tech operative, is Annie's guide in her new life. In the beginning, Annie's cover story is that she works in Acquisitions at the Smithsonian Museum but she is later let go. As of the fourth season, her new cover is that of a glamorous and well-connected importer/exporter, with expensive tastes and dealings that may not always be legal. The series traces Annie's evolution from a wide-eyed young operative who fetches coffee for her co-workers to a hardened spy who does not balk at enhanced interrogation. This change in tone is also seen in the opening credits, which used chick lit–style graphics in the early seasons. The cartoons, like the focus on Annie's home life with her sister, were gone in the fourth and fifth seasons.

== Cast and characters ==
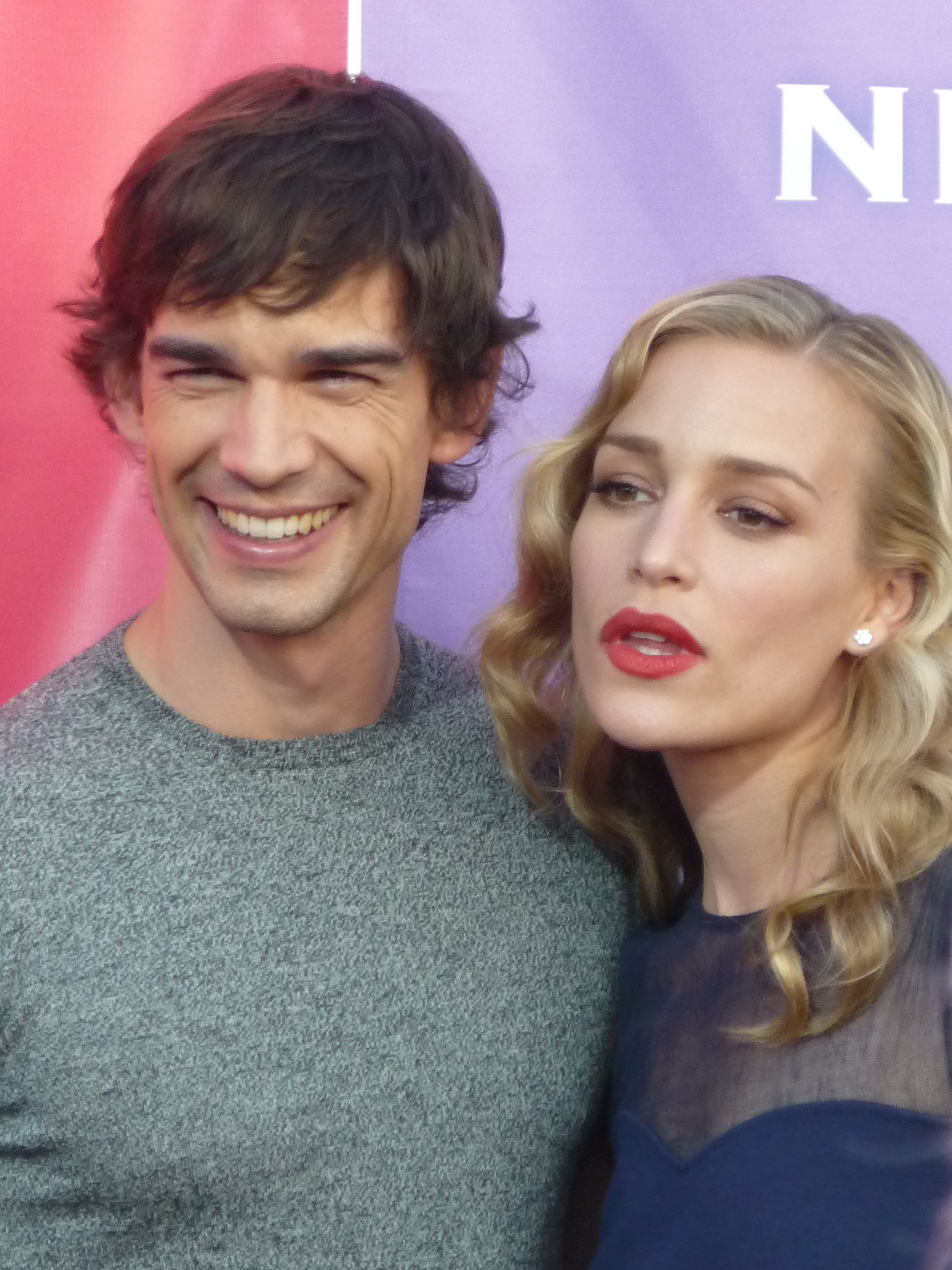
Christopher Gorham as August "Auggie" and Piper Perabo as Anne Catherine "Annie" Walker.

=== Main cast ===
- Piper Perabo as Anne Catherine "Annie" Walker: a CIA trainee who is suddenly promoted to field operative. In addition to English, she speaks seven languages fluently and several other languages with various skill levels.
- Christopher Gorham as August "Auggie" Anderson: Annie's handler. Auggie is a CIA military intelligence/special ops officer who was blinded while on a mission in Iraq where he served in an Army Special Forces unit.
- Kari Matchett as Joan Campbell: a senior officer who heads the Domestic Protection Division (DPD); she is Annie's supervisor and a skilled spymaster who was quite talented in her field days. She attended Pennsylvania State University, and her cover is that of an executive at the World Bank.
- Anne Dudek as Danielle Brooks (seasons 1–2, main; 3, recurring): Annie's older sister, who is married with two children; Annie lives in her guest house.
- Sendhil Ramamurthy as Jai Wilcox (seasons 1–3): CIA officer assigned to the DPD by Arthur Campbell. His family has a difficult history with the CIA; his father, Henry Wilcox, was formerly the CIA Director of the National Clandestine Service (D/NCS).
- Peter Gallagher as Arthur Campbell (seasons 2–5, main; 1, recurring): D/NCS. During his time as a field operative in the late eighties, he posed as a student in East Berlin to gather intel on the Stasi.
- Hill Harper as Calder Michaels (seasons 4–5): CIA station chief based in Medellin, Colombia who is reassigned to Langley. Calder becomes the new head of the DPD after Joan is made D/NCS.
- Nic Bishop as Ryan McQuaid (season 5): The owner of a private security firm for whom Arthur Campbell works, who finds himself working alongside Annie.

=== Recurring cast ===
- Oded Fehr as Eyal Lavin (seasons 1–5): A Mossad operative who occasionally works with Annie on her missions, and has become her confidante. The two are close, and turn to one another when in trouble.
- Noam Jenkins as Vincent Rossabi (season 1–4): an FBI agent with whom Annie must occasionally work despite their antagonistic relationship.
- Eion Bailey as Ben Mercer (seasons 1–2): Annie's ex-boyfriend, who was being targeted by the CIA, before returning to the Agency. He is hired by Arthur as a "black ops" agent.
- Emmanuelle Vaugier as Liza Hearn (seasons 1–2): A journalist with a mysterious source inside the CIA, who publishes a series of damaging articles about the Agency.
- Gregory Itzin as Henry Wilcox (seasons 1–4): The former Director of the National Clandestine Service and Jai Wilcox's father.
- Sarah Clarke as Lena Smith (season 3): Annie's supervisor in another CIA division.
- Richard Coyle as Simon Fischer (season 3): A venture capitalist and suspected SVR spy, whom Annie is assigned to cultivate while working in Lena's division during season 3.
- Perrey Reeves as Caitlyn Cook (season 5): Ryan McQuaid's assistant.
- Amy Jo Johnson as Hayley Price (season 5): An NCTC official who is investigating the Chicago bombing who forms a relationship with Auggie.

== Development, casting, and production ==
Covert Affairs first appeared on USA Network's development slate in July 2008. The pilot episode was written by Matt Corman and Chris Ord. Casting was underway in June 2009, with the expectation that successful casting would lead to a production commitment. Piper Perabo was the first actress cast in early July 2009, as CIA officer Annie Walker. The casting of Christopher Gorham came in late July, quickly followed by an announcement that the pilot had been green-lighted by USA Network.

In early August 2009, Tim Matheson signed on to direct a 90-minute pilot. Further casting announcements included Anne Dudek in mid-August, followed by Kari Matchett and Peter Gallagher in early September. Eric Lively was cast as a fellow CIA officer and peer to Perabo's character, and Eion Bailey was cast in a recurring role as Annie Walker's ex-boyfriend. The pilot began filming in Toronto in September 2009.

In January 2010, the Covert Affairs pilot received a 10-episodes order. Sendhil Ramamurthy was added to the cast as a CIA officer, replacing Lively's character, along with Emmanuelle Vaugier in a recurring role as a journalist.

The series executive producers are Doug Liman and David Bartis and the co-executive producer is Jonathan Glassner. Production of the series takes place in Toronto, Ontario, at primary static sets housed in a studio, as well as at "stock" shooting locations throughout the local area. This is combined with material filmed at various international locations in which the series' episodes are set, such as Washington, D.C., capturing geographically unique elements of these places. In some instances, the series' producers use a stand-in location for shots where the costs and logistics of the actual location shoot are impractical, or if the location specified is fictional.

== Episodes ==
Season	Timeslot (ET)	# Ep.	Premiered		Ended		TV Season	Viewers (in millions)
Season	Timeslot (ET)	# Ep.	Date	Premiere Viewers (in millions)	Date	Finale Viewers (in millions)	TV Season	Viewers (in millions)
1	Tuesday 10:00 pm (July 13, 2010 – Sept. 7, 2010); Tuesday 9:00 pm (Sept. 14, 2010)	11	July 13, 2010	4.88	September 14, 2010	5.23	2010	6.70
2	Tuesday 10:00 pm (June 7, 2011 – Nov. 20, 2012)	16	June 7, 2011	4.56	December 6, 2011	3.20	2011	5.64
3	Tuesday 10:00 pm (June 7, 2011 – Nov. 20, 2012)	16	July 10, 2012	3.50	November 20, 2012	2.47	2012	3.06
4	Tuesday 9:00 pm (July 16, 2013 – Sept. 17, 2013); Thursday 10:00 pm (Oct. 17, 2013 – Nov. 21, 2013)	16	July 16, 2013	2.39	November 21, 2013	2.34	2013	3.96
5	Tuesday 10:00 pm Thursday 10:00 pm	16	June 24, 2014	1.88	December 18, 2014	1.59	2014	3.3

== Reception ==
Covert Affairs received positive reviews from critics. The review aggregator website Rotten Tomatoes reports a 93% approval rating, while on Metacritic, the first season of Covert Affairs received a score of 64 out of 100, based on 23 reviews, indicating "generally favorable reviews". The second season received a score of 68, based on six reviews. At the 68th Golden Globe Awards, Piper Perabo was nominated for Best Performance by an Actress in a Television Series—Drama. She also won the award for Outstanding Female Actor in a Breakthrough Role at the Gracie Awards in 2011. Christopher Gorham won the Seeing Beyond Vision Loss Special Achievement Award at the CNIB Awards in 2013.

== DVD releases ==
Season	Episodes	DVD release dates			
Season	Episodes	Region 1	Region 2	Region 4	Discs
1	11	May 17, 2011	June 18, 2012	June 2, 2011	3
2	16	May 1, 2012	September 17, 2012	October 3, 2012	4
3	16	May 28, 2013	March 17, 2014	September 5, 2013	4
4	16	May 27, 2014	August 10, 2015	TBA	4
5	16	April 28, 2015	TBA	TBA	4
Total	75	TBA	TBA	TBA	TBA

== Syndication ==
Starting on November 14, 2022, Start TV aired reruns of the series.
