= Mad Mom =

2019 Canadian television film

Mad Mom, also known as Psycho Mother-in-Law, is a 2019 Canadian television film directed by Jean-François Rivard, and written by James Phillips. The film stars Romy Rosemont, Kari Matchett, and Victoria Diamond. Principal photography started in May 2018.

The film premiered on Lifetime on January 2, 2019 in the United States, with the title Psycho Mother-in-Law.

In 2019, the film received a Directors Guild of Canada nomination for Best Production Design – Movies For Television and Mini-Series.
