= Gage Golightly =

American actress (born 1993)

- Born: September 5, 1993 (age 33)
- Occupation: Actress
- Years active: 2002–2020

Gage Golightly (born September 5, 1993) is an American former actress. She is best known for her roles as Hayley Steele in the Nickelodeon series The Troop, Erica Reyes in the MTV series Teen Wolf, and Karen in the Amazon Studios series Red Oaks.

== Early life ==
Golightly grew up in Penn Valley, California, the youngest of four children born to a nurse and a plumber. She was diagnosed with dyspraxia at the age of two, and underwent speech therapy. For the first years of her life, her parents used sign language to communicate with her. Golightly also noted she was clumsy as a child due to impaired motor skills. She studied at Flintridge Sacred Heart Academy.

== Career ==
Golightly decided to become an actress at the age of eight. Her mother took her to Los Angeles, where she found a manager. A year later, Golightly started her career with roles in the 2002 film Speakeasy, and the television film The Long Shot. In 2004, she co-starred in the sci-fi miniseries Five Days to Midnight as Jesse Neumeyer and was in Sudbury, an unsold television pilot. In 2006, she was in the Disney Channel sitcom The Suite Life of Zack & Cody as Vanessa, before appearing in the TNT series Heartland.

She portrayed main character Hayley in the Nickelodeon series The Troop, a series about a group of teenagers who fight monsters. In 2010 and 2011, she had guest roles on True Jackson, VP and Big Time Rush, before a recurring role on Ringer as Tessa, a high school student. In 2012, Golightly had a recurring role on the MTV series Teen Wolf during the show's second season as Erica Reyes, the show's first living female werewolf. Golightly was set to reprise the role during the show's third season, which began filming in late 2012, but the actress only filmed a few cameo scenes. She exited the show as she had been cast as the female lead in a pilot for The CW titled Company Town. In May 2013, it was announced that the pilot had not been greenlit.

Throughout 2011 and 2012 Golightly worked on a Marcus Nispel horror film titled Backmask, which was later retitled Exeter. Golightly also worked on Gone Missing for the Lifetime network, playing the role of Matty. In June 2014, Golightly was cast as a series regular in an Amazon Studios comedy pilot Red Oaks, in which she played the role of Karen. The series began filming their first season in late May 2015. In 2016, Golightly appeared as Karen in the remake of Eli Roth's horror film, Cabin Fever. In May 2016, Golightly was cast as Libby in the dance-comedy film Step Sisters.

Golightly appeared on the short-lived ABC drama, Ten Days in the Valley, as a character named Lynn, in a three episode arc. In February 2018 Golightly was cast in a leading role, playing struggling actress Kate, in The CW television pilot, The End of the World As We Know It. In 2019, Golightly guest starred in three episodes of iZombie before being cast as Grace Durkin in the Paramount series 68 Whiskey.

Golightly has since gone on to attend the University of California, Los Angeles, where in 2025 she received a Bachelor of Arts in psychology and gender studies, and was planning to obtain her Ph.D.

== Filmography ==
=== Film ===
Year	Title	Role	Notes
2002	Speakeasy	Eva	
2003	The Vest	Karen	Short film
2013	Gone Missing	Maddy	
2015	Exeter	Amber	
2016	Cabin Fever	Karen	
2018	Step Sisters	Libby	
2019	The Last Summer	Paige Wilcox	

=== Television ===
Year	Title	Role	Notes	Ref.
2003	A Carol Christmas	9-year-old Carol	Television film	
2004	Sudbury	Kylie Owens	Unsold television pilot	
2004	The Long Shot	Taylor Garrett	Television film	
2004	Five Days to Midnight	Jesse Neumeyer	Main role	
2005	Don't Ask	Ivy Collins	Unsold Television Pilot	
2006	The Suite Life of Zack & Cody	Vanessa	Episode: "A Midsummer's Nightmare"	
2006	Brothers & Sisters	Paige Traylor	Unaired television pilot	
2007	Heartland	Thea Grant	Main role	
2009–2013	The Troop	Hayley Steele	Main role	
2010	True Jackson, VP	Vanessa	Episode: "Trapped in Paris"	
2011	Big Time Rush	Annie	Episodes: "Big Time Beach Party: Parts 1 & 2"	
2011	Growing Up Normal	Karen Jackson	Unsold television pilot	
2011–2012	Ringer	Tessa Banner	Recurring role; 7 episodes	
2012–2013	Teen Wolf	Erica Reyes	Recurring role (season 2); guest role (season 3); 11 episodes	
2013	Company Town	Krista	Unsold television pilot	
2014–2017	Red Oaks	Karen	Main role	
2017	Ten Days in the Valley	Lynn	Episodes: "Day 3: Day Out of Days", "Day 4: Below the Line", "Day 5: Back to Ones"	
2017	Law & Order: Special Victims Unit	Katy Miller	Episode: "Intent"	
2019	iZombie	Alice "Al" Bronson	Episodes: "Dot Zom", "Death Moves Pretty Fast", "The Scratchmaker"	
2020	68 Whiskey	Corporal Grace Durkin	Main role	
