= Five Days to Midnight =

- Written by: Robert Zappia; David Aaron Cohen; Anthony Peckham; Cindy Myers
- Directed by: Michael W. Watkins
- Starring: Timothy Hutton; Randy Quaid; Angus Macfadyen; Kari Matchett
- Country of origin: United States

Production
- Executive producers: David Aaron Cohen; David Kirschner; Anthony Peckham; Corey Sienega; Robert Zappia; Karen Loop
- Producer: Gordon Mark
- Running time: 210 minutes
- Production companies: David Kirschner Productions; Hallmark Entertainment; Lions Gate Television

Original release
- Network: Sci Fi
- Release: June 7 – June 10, 2004

Five Days to Midnight (styled as 5ive Days to Midnight) is a five-part television miniseries which ran on the Sci Fi Channel in June 2004. It stars Timothy Hutton as J.T. Neumeyer, a physicist who discovers a briefcase containing postdated documents and evidence which indicates he will die five days into the future.

The miniseries was five hours long including commercials, each hour dedicated to relating the events of an entire day. It ran for four days, the first episode detailing the events of the first two days.

== Cast ==
- Timothy Hutton: J.T. Neumeyer
- Randy Quaid: Irwin Sikorski
- Kari Matchett: Claudia Whitney
- Hamish Linklater: Carl Axelrod
- Angus Macfadyen: Roy Bremmer
- Gage Golightly: Jesse Neumeyer
- Nicole de Boer: Chantal Hume
- David McIlwraith: Brad Hume

== Plot ==
=== Day One ===
Physics professor J.T. Neumeyer is celebrating his daughter's tenth birthday, as well as mourning the tenth anniversary of the death of his wife who died giving birth. While at the cemetery, J.T.'s daughter Jesse finds a futuristic briefcase with "Professor J.T. Neumeyer" on it behind her mother's headstone. J.T. thinks that it must belong to some other "Professor J.T. Neumeyer" (despite the unlikelihood that such a person would also live in Seattle and have paid a visit to the same grave), and attempts to open the combination-locked briefcase to discover more about its owner. He finally succeeds by entering his daughter's birth date. Upon opening the briefcase, Neumeyer finds a police file complete with photos, newspaper clippings, and evidence detailing his brutal murder five days in the future.

J.T. is naturally unnerved, but intends to discover the source of the briefcase. At first he thinks it is a prank perpetrated by an exceptionally brilliant but eccentric graduate student named Carl Axelrod. He tracks down Irwin Sikorski, the homicide detective whose name appears on the police file as investigating officer. The detective points out the holes in the story, noting that the file says he missed the autopsy, and he doesn't know the last time he missed an autopsy. J.T. goes home to contemplate the day's events and figure out how to proceed. J.T.'s girlfriend Claudia gives him a blue parka; the case file says that he will be wearing this same coat when he is found dead in five days.

=== Day Two ===
More things from the file start to come true. A rental company sends J.T. a green Jeep Cherokee which also appears in the photos. Sikorski informs J.T. that he had previously scheduled a doctor's appointment on the date of the predicted autopsy, and wouldn't have been able to be there. The back of one of the newspaper clippings in the briefcase is the story of Mandy Murphy, a young woman killed by a falling tree in a windstorm. Acting on this knowledge, J.T. prevents her death, thus altering the future. It isn't until this moment that he is completely convinced that the things in the briefcase are real. Carl is cleared as a suspect and J.T. enlists him in discovering how the briefcase could have come from the future. Another suspect on the list is Claudia's supposed ex-husband, Roy Bremmer, a gangster who has been tracing Claudia's movements. Claudia confesses to J.T. that she is still married to Bremmer, and gives J.T. a gun for protection. Claudia plans to flee before Bremmer can locate her, but J.T. convinces her to stay so that he can protect her. A man in a car across the street is taking pictures of them.

=== Day Three ===
Motives are established for the list of suspects in the police file:

- It becomes clear that Carl — who has a religious reverence for physics — begins to see J.T.'s death as inevitable.
- Brad is deeply in debt from bad investments, facing loss of all his property. He thinks he could make a lot of money from reverse-engineering the suitcase, but is rebuffed by J.T., and sees him as blocking his financial recovery.
- Roy Bremmer finds J.T. and threatens him and Jesse if Claudia (revealed to be originally named Angela) is not returned to him.
- Claudia increases the life insurance policy on J.T. to $4 million.

J.T. also seeks to escape his fate by flying out of the city. The plane takes off, to J.T.'s relief. Yet less than an hour into the flight, the plane must return to the city when a passenger becomes dangerously ill.

At the end of the episode, it is reported that Mandy Murphy has died in a horrible car crash. Although J.T prevented her death in one accident, she still died in another accident. J.T. begins to believe that, though he can change the circumstances and details of someone's death, he cannot change someone's ultimate fate, including possibly his own.

=== Day Four ===
J.T. resigns himself to his fate and makes a video for Jesse, listing things he would have liked to have seen in the future. Jesse begins her own investigation. She notes that Mandy Murphy's dog was also killed by the falling tree, but the dog was not in the car, and no one knows what became of it. This leads Jesse to believe that the future is still changeable.

J.T. changes his tactics to alter the future and tries to remove the motives or block the opportunities of the suspects on the list:

- He is unable to convince Carl that physics is simply physics, and tricks Carl into a hospital for the mentally disabled.
- He promises Brad the briefcase after he solves his own case, to remove Brad's potential threat.
- He meets Bremmer and offers him the money to be made by reverse-engineering the briefcase, but Bremmer is not interested. J.T. even tries to shoot him as a last resort, but is not able to pull the trigger. Sikorski arrives at the scene and has Bremmer arrested.
- He does not believe Claudia has a reasonable motive to kill him, and instead works with her to remove the other threats.

The day ends with the escape of Carl from the hospital. He steals the briefcase from J.T.'s house. Brad intercepts Carl leaving with it and attacks him, but without success. Bremmer is released from jail once his lawyer gets involved. All three suspects have the motive and freedom to kill J.T.

=== Day Five ===
Sikorski kills Bremmer, then turns on J.T. and Claudia. Sikorski reveals that he knows Claudia will inherit $12 million worth of property from Bremmer. He intends to force Claudia to sign a quitclaim, then kill her and J.T., and gain ownership of the property.

Carl steals J.T.'s rented green Jeep. Carl and Brad independently head to the bar where Sikorski has taken Claudia and J.T. Carl tries to kill Brad with the stolen Jeep, but Brad shoots at him. Carl loses control of the Jeep, which crashes into the bar, knocking down Sikorski. J.T. loads the empty gun Sikorski gave him with a cartridge from the briefcase. Sikorski asserts that the cartridge won't work because it is from the future, but J.T. kills him with it seconds before Sikorski fires his own gun.

Carl intends to kill J.T., believing that the events revealed by the briefcase must not be altered. J.T. tells Carl to look in the briefcase, predicting that the police file has changed to reflect the deaths of Bremmer and Sikorski, and now details their unsuccessful plots to kill J.T. Carl becomes fascinated by the change, believing that physics has been satisfied.

As the survivors leave the bar, J.T. surmises that Jesse — whose middle name is Tracy — will be the "Professor J.T. Neumeyer" who owns the briefcase in the future, and that she will send the briefcase back as a warning to her father, by some as-yet nonexistent technology.
