= Kari Matchett =

Canadian actress

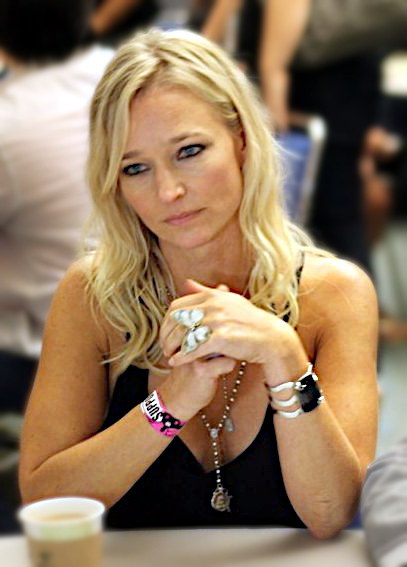
- Matchett in 2011
- Born: Spalding, Saskatchewan, Canada
- Occupation: Actress
- Years active: 1996–present
- Spouse: T. W. Peacocke (m. 1998; div. 2006)
- Children: 1

Kari Matchett is a Canadian actress. She is known for her roles as Colleen Blessed on Power Play, Joan Campbell on Covert Affairs, Kate Filmore in the science fiction movie Cube 2: Hypercube, and U.S. president Michelle Travers on The Night Agent. She has also appeared in films such as Apartment Hunting (2000), Angel Eyes (2001), Men with Brooms (2002), Cypher (2002), Civic Duty (2006), The Tree of Life (2011), and Maudie (2016).

== Early life and education ==
Matchett was born in Spalding, Saskatchewan. She attended high school at Lethbridge Collegiate Institute in Lethbridge, Alberta. She attended Red Deer Polytechnic (then Red Deer College) in the Theatre program and received her first professional experience in RDP's Summer Stock productions. She attended the National Theatre School in Montreal and the Moscow Theatre School.

Matchett performed on stage for three years at the Stratford Shakespeare Festival in Ontario.

== Career ==
In Canada, her first major role was on The Rez, and her first starring role was as Colleen Blessed in Power Play (1998–2000). Matchett was a cast member on the A&E Network TV series A Nero Wolfe Mystery (2001–2002), with Timothy Hutton in which she played several characters, including a recurring role as Lily Rowan. On Wonderfalls, she played Beth, the bisexual love interest of the main character's lesbian sister.

In 2001, she played Candace in the drama film Angel Eyes. In 2002, she played Kate Filmore in the science fiction horror thriller Cube 2: Hypercube.

In 2003, she starred with Timothy Hutton in the Syfy miniseries Five Days to Midnight. Her next role was as Detective Elaine Bender in Blue Murder in 2004. She previously guest starred on Blue Murder in 2001 as a suspect in a murder investigation, for which she won a Gemini Award.

In 2005, Matchett starred in the ABC series Invasion, about aliens taking the form of humans. She also appeared in Plague City: SARS in Toronto. She also appeared as Mary Tate on Studio 60 on the Sunset Strip. She appeared in both Shark and Wild Card. She played a single mother stalked by her boyfriend in Intimate Stranger, in 2006. In the same year she starred with Peter Krause in Civic Duty.

In 2007, Matchett joined the cast of 24, as Lisa Miller. In June 2007, she played Kate Armstrong in the TNT series Heartland. In 2007 and 2008, she was cast as ER chief Skye Wexler on ER. In 2008 and 2009, she played Dennis Hopper's character's daughter, Jules, in the critically acclaimed Starz series Crash. She had a recurring role in the TNT series Leverage, reuniting with Nero Wolfe co-star Timothy Hutton, portraying Maggie Collins, the ex-wife of Hutton's character, Nathan "Nate" Ford. Matchett starred as Joan Campbell in the USA Network series Covert Affairs (2010–2014).

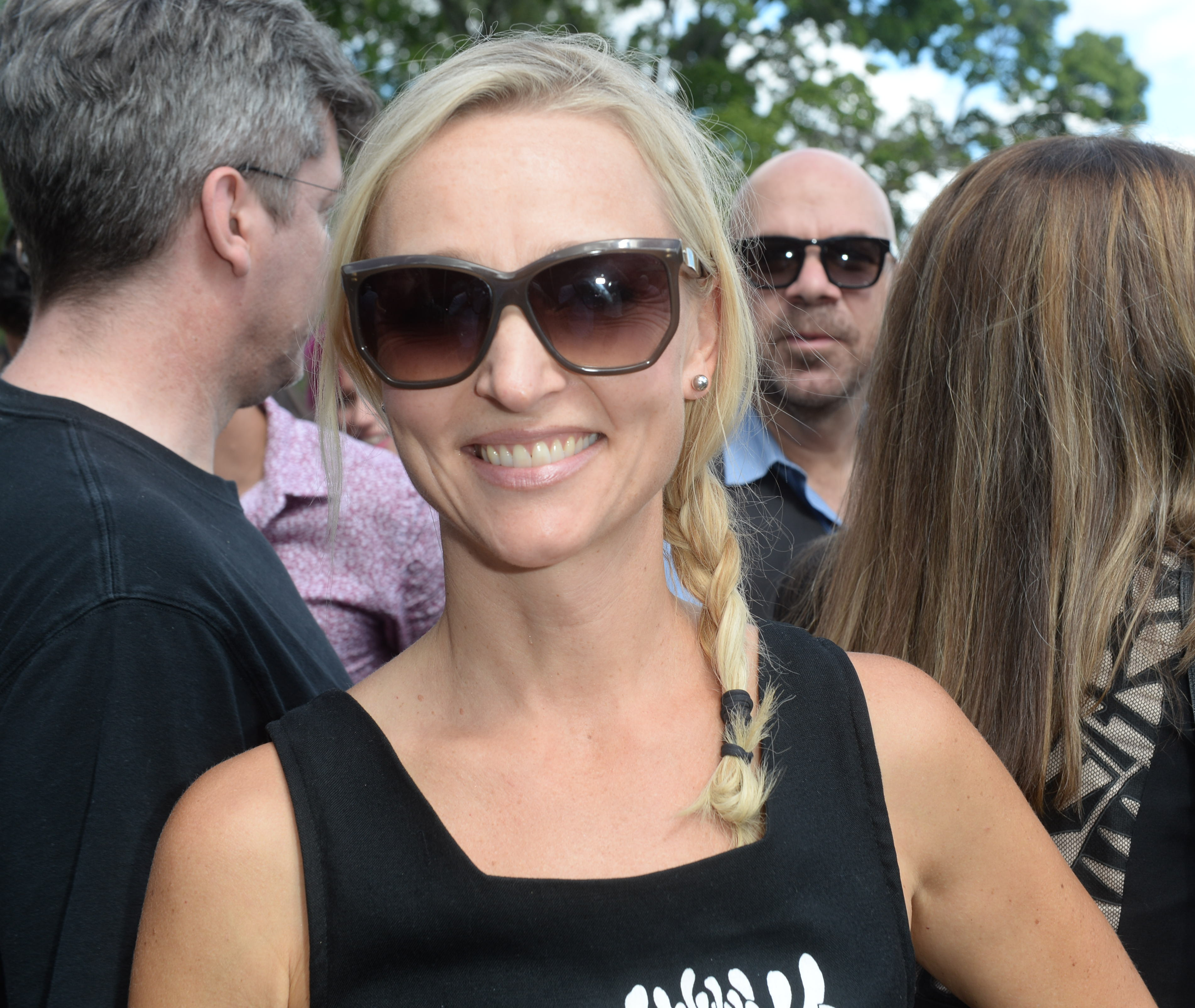
Matchett in September 2016

In 2016, Matchett appeared as Sandra in Maudie with Ethan Hawke. She also played a supporting role in Terrence Malick's The Tree of Life, with Sean Penn and Brad Pitt. Shot in 2008, the film premiered in competition at the Cannes Film Festival in May 2011 and received the Palme d'Or.

In 2023, Matchett was cast in a recurring role as U.S. president Michelle Travers in the Netflix drama television series The Night Agent.

== Filmography ==
=== Film ===
| Year | Film | Role | Notes |
|---|---|---|---|
| 1998 | Papertrail | Alison Enola | |
| 2000 | Apartment Hunting | Sarah | |
| 2001 | Angel Eyes | Candace | |
| 2002 | Men with Brooms | Linda Bucyk | |
| 2002 | Cube 2: Hypercube | Kate Filmore | |
| 2002 | 19 Months | Page | |
| 2002 | Cypher | Diane | |
| 2006 | Civic Duty | Marla Allen | |
| 2006 | Goose on the Loose | Donna Archer | |
| 2011 | The Tree of Life | Jack's ex | |
| 2015 | Lead With Your Heart | Maura McCabe Walker | |
| 2016 | Maudie | Sandra | |
| 2018 | Into Invisible Light | Lydia | |
| 2019 | Code 8 | Mary Reed | |
| 2020 | 2 Hearts | Grace | |
| 2023 | Hailey Rose | Olga | |
| 2024 | Code 8: Part II | Connor's mom | |

=== Television ===
| Year | Title | Role | Notes |
|---|---|---|---|
| 1996 | The Rez | Tanya Nanibush Beakhert | Main role |
| 1996 | Forever Knight | Alyss de Brabant | Episode: "Dead of Knight" |
| 1996 | Undue Influence | Marcie Reed | Television film |
| 1996–1997 | Ready or Not | Sheila Ramone | Recurring role (seasons 4–5) |
| 1997 | Psi Factor: Chronicles of the Paranormal | Mary O'Brien | Episode: "The Curse / Angel on a Plane" |
| 1997 | What Happened to Bobby Earl? | Nicki Corlis | Television film; also known as Murder in a College Town |
| 1997 | Breach of Faith: A Family of Cops 2 | Marina | Television film |
| 1997 | Viper | Beatrice | Episode: "Triple Cross" |
| 1998 | Once a Thief | Claire Holland | Episode: "Wedding Bell Blues" |
| 1998 | Poltergeist: The Legacy | Caroline Crane | Episode: "The Human Vessel" |
| 1998 | A Marriage of Convenience | Elizabeth | Television film |
| 1998 | Earth: Final Conflict | Siobhan Beckett | Recurring role (seasons 1–2) |
| 1998 | Earth: Final Conflict | Rho'ha | 2 episodes |
| 1998–2000 | Power Play | Colleen Blessed | Main role; Gemini Award nominee (2000) |
| 1999 | Rembrandt: Fathers & Sons | Saskia van Rijn | Television film |
| 2000 | Task Force: Caviar | Linda | Television film |
| 2001 | A Colder Kind of Death | Maureen Gault | Television film; Gemini Award nominee (2001) |
| 2001 | All Souls | Stefani Volette | Episode: "Spineless" |
| 2001 | Blue Murder | Christina Kondeatis / Carol Clark | Episode: "Intensive Care"; Gemini Award |
| 2001 | A Nero Wolfe Mystery | Lily Rowan / various | Recurring role |
| 2002 | The Glow | Allison | Television film |
| 2003 | Betrayed | Judy Bryce | Television film |
| 2004 | 5ive Days to Midnight | Claudia Whitey | Television miniseries |
| 2004 | Blue Murder | Elaine Bender | Main role (season 4) |
| 2004 | Wonderfalls | Beth | 3 episodes |
| 2004 | A Very Married Christmas | Donna | Television film |
| 2005 | The Eleventh Hour | Carrina Mallett | Episode: "Zugzwang" |
| 2005 | Puppets Who Kill | Laura | Episode: "Dan and the New Neighbour" |
| 2005 | Plague City: SARS in Toronto | Amy | Television film |
| 2005 | Wild Card | Gigi Germain | Episode: "My Boyfriend is an Axe Murderer" |
| 2005–2006 | Invasion | Mariel Underlay | Main role |
| 2006 | Intimate Stranger | Karen Reese | Television film |
| 2006 | Shark | Monica Tanner | Episode: "Dial M for Monica" |
| 2007 | 24 | Lisa Miller | Recurring role (season 6) |
| 2007 | Studio 60 on the Sunset Strip | Mary Tate | Recurring role |
| 2007 | Heartland | Kate Armstrong | Main role |
| 2007 | ER | Skye Wexler | Recurring role (season 14) |
| 2008 | Ugly Betty | Dr. Wallace | Episode: "Betty's Baby Bump" |
| 2008 | The Cleaner | Shelly Mullins | Episode: "Lie with Me" |
| 2008 | Criminal Minds | Amy Bridges | Episode: "The Instincts" |
| 2008 | Crash | Jules | Recurring role |
| 2009 | Flashpoint | Delia Semple | Episode: "Clean Hands" |
| 2009 | The Philanthropist | Renee Adams | Episode: "San Diego" |
| 2009 | The National Tree | Faith | Television film |
| 2009 | Leverage | Maggie Collins | 4 episodes |
| 2010 | Meteor Storm | Michelle | Television film |
| 2010 | Miami Medical | Helena Sable | 2 episodes |
| 2010–2014 | Covert Affairs | Joan Campbell | Main role |
| 2012 | Saving Hope | Kendra Watt | Episode: "A New Beginning" |
| 2012 | The Riverbank | Kate Mason | Television film |
| 2012 | The Horses of McBride | Avril Davidson | Television film |
| 2013 | Elementary | Kathryn Drummand | Episode: "The Deductionist" |
| 2015 | Murdoch Mysteries | Miss Heloise | Episode: "The Devil Wears Whalebone" |
| 2017 | The Good Doctor | Liam's mother | Episode: "22 Steps" |
| 2018 | Return to Christmas Creek | Pamela | Television film |
| 2018 | The Detail | Diane Taylor | Episode: "The Devil and the Deep Blue Sea" |
| 2019 | Mad Mom | Jill Jones | Television film; also known as Psycho Mother-in-Law |
| 2020 | Fortunate Son | Mary Howard | Main role |
| 2020 | Hudson & Rex | Lisa Bunting | Episode: "Grave Matters" |
| 2021 | Charmed | Lori Brewster | Episode: "O, The Tangled Web" |
| 2021 | Supergirl | Jean Rankin | 2 episodes |
| 2023–2025 | The Night Agent | Michelle Travers | Main role (season 1); guest (season 2) |
| 2023 | Fargo | Linda Tillman | Episode: "Linda" (season 5) |
| 2025–2026 | The Hunting Party | Eve Lazarus | Recurring (seasons 1–2) |
| 2026 | Vladimir | Lynn | 2 episodes |

== Awards and nominations ==
| Year | Award | Category | Nominated work | Result | Ref. |
|---|---|---|---|---|---|
| 2000 | Gemini Awards | Best Performance by an Actress in a Continuing Leading Role in a Dramatic Series | Power Play | Nominated | |
| 2001 | Gemini Awards | Best Performance by an Actress in a Featured Supporting Role in a Dramatic Program or Miniseries | A Colder Kind of Death | Nominated | |
| 2001 | Gemini Awards | Best Performance by an Actress in a Guest Role in a Dramatic Series | Blue Murder | Won | |
| 2003 | ACTRA Toronto Awards | Outstanding Performance – Female | A Nero Wolfe Mystery | Nominated | |
| 2017 | ACTRA Toronto Awards | Outstanding Performance – Female | Maudie | Nominated | |
| 2021 | ACTRA Toronto Awards | Outstanding Performance – Female | Fortunate Son | Nominated | |
