= Fusion (Star Trek: Enterprise) =

- Star Trek: Enterprise episode
- Episode no.: Season 1 Episode 17
- Directed by: Rob Hedden
- Story by: Rick Berman; Brannon Braga
- Teleplay by: Phyllis Strong; Mike Sussman
- Production code: 117
- Original air date: February 27, 2002

Guest appearances
- Enrique Murciano - Tolaris; Robert Pine - Tavin; Vaughn Armstrong - Admiral Forrest; John Harrington Bland - Kov

Episode chronology
← Previous "Shuttlepod One"	Next → "Rogue Planet"
- Star Trek: Enterprise season 1

"Fusion" is the seventeenth episode (production #117) of the television series Star Trek: Enterprise. Set in the 22nd century, the science fiction television episode is about a spaceship exploring a galaxy filled with alien life. It aired on UPN on February 27, 2002.

Enterprise encounters a group of unconventional Vulcans, one of whom leads T'Pol into further exploring her emotions.

== Plot ==
Enterprise is near the Arachnid Nebula when it is hailed by Captain Tavin, of the Vulcan vessel Vahklas, which is in need of repair. On Enterprise Tavin says that they left Vulcan eight years previously, and their mission is to explore themselves rather than the galaxy. Sub-Commander T'Pol identifies them as V'tosh ka'tur, Vulcans without logic. Captain Archer reports that the repairs will take up to four days and that they should use that time to explore the nebula. He also observes that T'Pol has been avoiding the Vulcans, encouraging her to keep an open mind. In the Mess Hall, T'Pol is joined by Tolaris, who comments that she has been affected by human society in more ways than she realizes.

T'Pol reports that a full nebula charting mission would take several weeks. However, Vahklas has translinear sensors that would cut the time down significantly. On the Vahklas, T'Pol expresses curiosity that the Vulcans display the likeness of Surak but reject his teachings. Tolaris has no regrets in exploring a balance of reason and emotion, and asks T'Pol not to meditate that night and to experience her dreams. Later, she does dream - she is in San Francisco, in disguise, walking around in the night. The memories then blur with thoughts of Tolaris acting provocatively towards her, ending with an image of the two of them in bed. She awakes and visits Doctor Phlox, who tells her that it would be unwise to change her routine too quickly.

Later, Tolaris asks T'Pol what her dreams were like, and he tells her about the Mind Meld, an ancient technique abandoned by Vulcans centuries ago. When she tries to end the meld, Tolaris persists, until finally she forces him away. Archer later summons Tolaris and tells him to keep away from T'Pol, who is now recovering in Sickbay. Tolaris reacts violently, so Archer orders the Vulcans to leave. Later T'Pol is meditating in her quarters when Archer tells her that ship has departed. As he turns to leave, T'Pol asks the Captain if he dreams. Archer replies that he does, sometimes even in color. T'Pol then asks the Captain if he finds it enjoyable. He replies that most nights he does. T'Pol then says "I envy you".

== Production ==
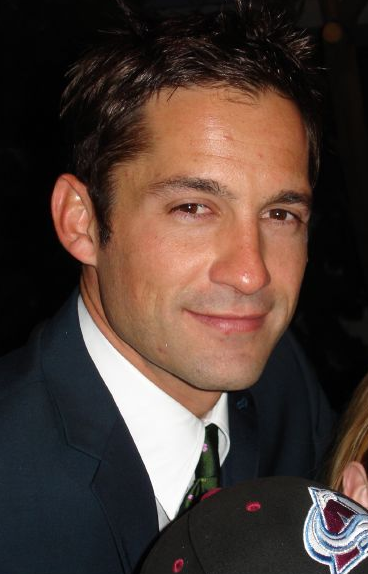
Enrique Murciano guest starred as Tolaris, part of a group of Vulcans who explore their emotions

The episode was originally title "Equilibrium" but was later changed to "Fusion". There was already a Star Trek: Deep Space Nine episode titled "Equilibrium". Director Rob Hedden was known for his work on Friday the 13th Part VIII: Jason Takes Manhattan and this was his only episode of Enterprise. Hedden also co-wrote the 2002 film Clockstoppers which was directed by former Star Trek actor Jonathan Frakes.

Brannon Braga talked about bringing sensuality to Star Trek, and called the episode "a twisted tale of seduction, like a Vulcan 9½ Weeks."

Robert Pine guest starred as the Vulcan Captain Tavin, and is the father of actor Chris Pine, who played Captain Kirk in the JJ Abrams Star Trek film series. Robert Pine previously appeared in Star Trek: Voyager in the episode "The Chute". Pine struggled with the technical dialogue due to his ADD, and on his first day repeatedly messed up a simple line, but praised Scott Bakula for his patience. According to Connor Trinneer, one of the actors playing a Vulcan left before filming completed, and had to be recast and his scenes reshot.

Blalock enjoyed this T'Pol centric episode: "I hate to sound biased, but it was so much fun to do. It was the first T'Pol spotlight episode."

== Continuity ==
The actions of this episode are revisited in the Season 2 episode "Stigma", when it is revealed that T'Pol has contracted Pa'nar Syndrome from the mind meld performed in this episode. The Pa'nar Syndrome and mind meld theme continues in the Season 4 three-part story arc of "The Forge", "Awakening" (in which T’Pol is cured by T'Pau) and "Kir'Shara".

== Reception ==
"Fusion" was first aired in the United States on UPN on February 27, 2002. According to Nielsen Media Research, it received a 3.0/5 rating share among adults. It had an average of 4.5 million viewers. This episode marked the ratings low point of the season.

Ain't It Cool News gave the episode 3.5 out of five, and praised Blalock for her performance and the guest actors for keeping up with her. Television Without Pity gave the episode a grade B. Michelle Eric Green of TrekNation was relieved to find the episode was nothing like 9½ Weeks, and that sexuality was depicted appropriately, but said that if the show was not going to be suitable for family viewing, it needed to be marketed more responsibly. She praised Enrique Murciano's "creepy, sleazy performance" and noted: "Blalock must demonstrate the character's vulnerability without making her appear weak or victimized; she does an excellent job." Keith DeCandido of Tor.com gave it four out of ten in his 2022 rewatch.

== Home media ==
This episode was released as part of Enterprise season one, which was released in high definition on Blu-ray disc on March 26, 2013; the release has 1080p video and a DTS-HD Master Audio sound track.
