= Rogue Planet (Star Trek: Enterprise) =

- Star Trek: Enterprise episode
- Episode no.: Season 1 Episode 18
- Directed by: Allan Kroeker
- Story by: Rick Berman; Brannon Braga; Chris Black
- Teleplay by: Chris Black
- Cinematography by: Marvin V. Rush
- Editing by: Robert Lederman
- Production code: 118
- Original air date: March 20, 2002

Guest appearances
- Stephanie Niznik - The Wraith; Conor O'Farrell - Burzaan; Eric Pierpoint - Shiraht; Keith Szarabajka - Damrus

Episode chronology
← Previous "Fusion"	Next → "Acquisition"
- Star Trek: Enterprise season 1

"Rogue Planet" is the eighteenth episode (production #118) of the American science fiction television series Star Trek: Enterprise. The episode first aired March 20, 2002 on UPN.

While exploring an uncharted planet, Enterprise crew members encounter a group of aliens who are hunting indigenous creatures for recreation.

The episode had a Nielsen rating of 3.3, and received generally negative reviews.

== Plot ==
A planet appears on sensors, adrift and without a solar system, so Captain Archer has Sub-Commander T'Pol scan the planet. Lieutenant Reed detects a ship near the equator, and an away team finds the remains of a campsite two hundred meters from the alien shuttle. T'Pol and Reed return to the shuttle while Archer and Ensign Sato stay. As they walk through the jungle, they are surprised by two aliens. Both parties return to the camp, where they find Archer and Sato with another called Damrus. The Eska call the planet Dakala and they permit the away team to spend the night. Over dinner, Damrus explains that they have been visiting Dakala for nine generations to hunt the wildlife.

As the away team turns in for the night, Archer hears a woman's voice calling his name. He finds a blonde woman in a clearing, but she runs away. Later, no one reports seeing anything unusual. In the morning, T'Pol goes to investigate a geothermal shaft and Archer sees the woman again, looking distressed, but again she disappears. Meanwhile, Damrus and Burzaan detect their quarry, a wraith which attacks Burzaan. Archer has Burzaan sent back to Enterprise for treatment, and Doctor Phlox reports that he has found cellular residue in Burzaan's wound.

By the steam vents, Archer encounters the woman again. She says that her kind can assume the form of anything on the planet, and that her kind want the hunting to stop. Later, Damrus explains that the reason they visit Dakala is because the prey can sense their thoughts, making them challenging to hunt and kill. Back on board Enterprise, Archer asks Phlox if he can find a way for the wraiths to mask their chemical signature, and soon, on Dakala, the hunting party begins having problems detecting them. Damrus wonders why, but Archer merely blames it on bad luck. The Eska depart and Archer encounters the woman one final time. As she moves off into the forest, she assumes her natural form: a large gastropod.

== Production ==
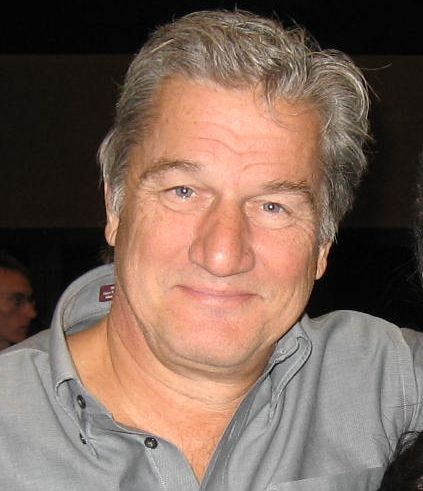
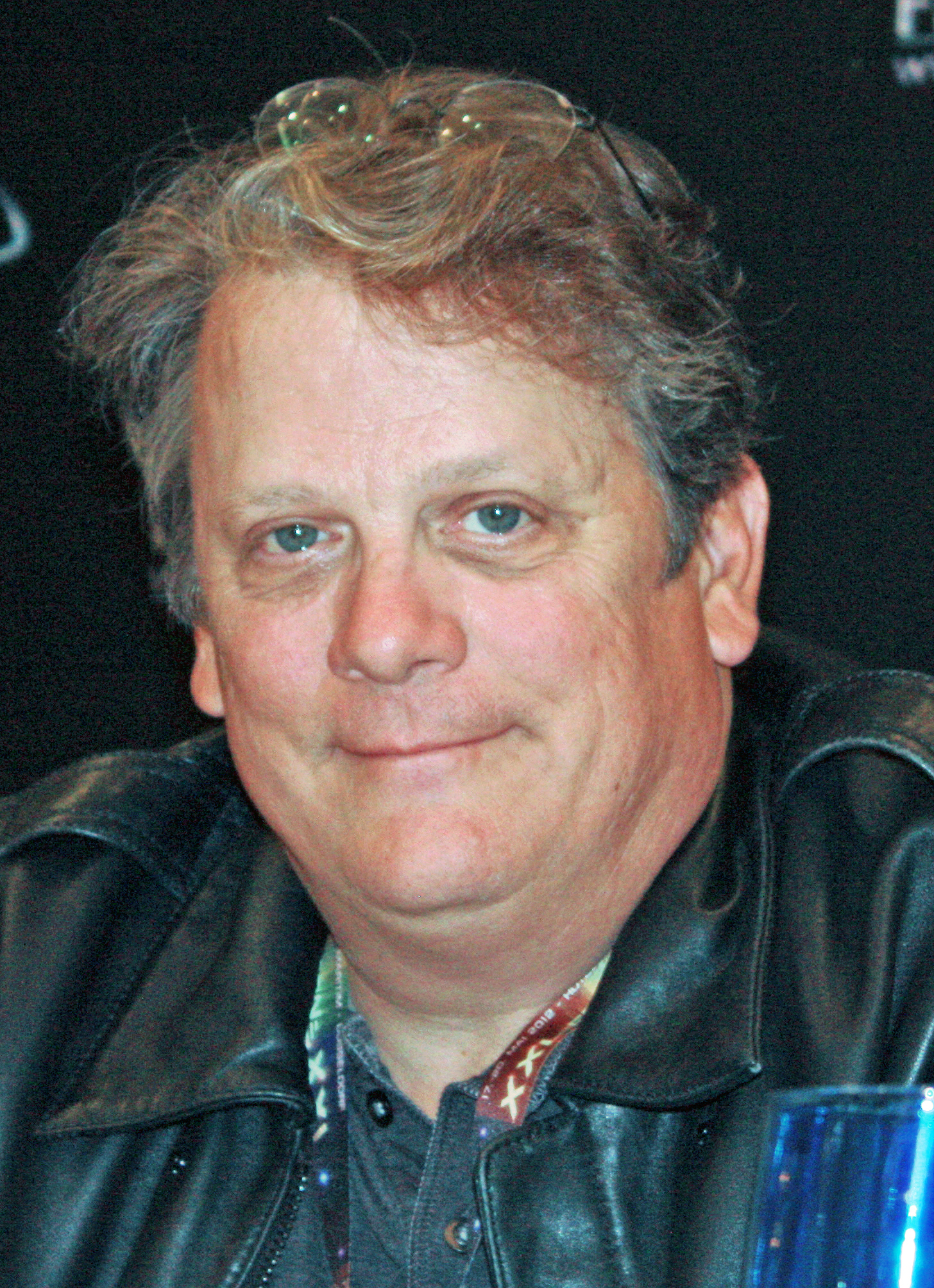
Guest stars Eric Pierpoint and Keith Szarabajka appear as hunters from a planet called Eska.

Chris Black was the sole credited writer but noted that many others contributed to creating the episode. The episode began as pitch from science advisor Andre Bormanis who suggested an orphan planet without a sun, that managed to support life because of its extreme geothermal vents. It was combined with other ideas, the premise of doing some kind of a "safari show", and producer Rick Berman added the idea of using a poem by William Butler Yeats called "The Song of Wandering Aengus". Black explained the episode was not intended to be an anti-hunting story, as his family would hunt, and that it was about finding a way to explore the character of Lieutenant Reed and his interest in the tactical elements of hunting and tracking. It was only when the species was revealed to be sentient that it became a moral issue. The episode was a balance between story and theme, Brannon Braga said they wanted to "tell a good story about people first, and let the themes emerge." Black had no complaints about how his script was translated to the screen, and praised Dominic Keating for enhancing what he had written through his performance, specifically by adding ambiguity to the line "Don't worry, captain, I won't kill anything". It wasn't in the script but Keating reasoned that the character "Well, he might like to take a shot—you never know." Editor Robert Lederman found the episode interesting as it shows the Enterprise discovering of a species of shapeshifters for the first time.

In this episode actress Stephanie Niznik guest stars as the wraith alien. She was previously cast in the 1998 movie Star Trek: Insurrection as Kell Perim, a Starfleet Ensign, and also known for her role on the series Everwood. Conor O'Farrell, who plays Burzaan, the leader of Eska hunting party, previously appeared in the Deep Space Nine episode "Little Green Men", and in Enterprise again in the season 3 episode "Chosen Realm". This was the fourth Star Trek series that Eric Pierpoint had appeared in, and he returned to Enterprise again in season 4. Keith Szarabajka previously appeared in the Star Trek: Voyager episode "Repression", and was known for his recurring role on the series Angel as vampire hunter Holz.

Dominic Keating said that it was a difficult shoot, and conditions were unpleasant: "This planet has no light we're in some dark, dingy, forest. You turn the torch on all you can see are particles in the air, and we're breathing it in 15 hours a day." They were still able to have some fun with the guest actors, he said. "They are hysterical! So sometimes it's really work, but in amongst that we're just laughing like hyenas." During shooting, director of photography Marvin Rush had to use a powerful flashlight to paint the path of the laser beams to create realistic illumination across the leaves for the weapons fire that would be added in post production.

The "Rogue Planet" of the title presented some challenges for Ron B. Moore and the visual effects team at EdenFX. As it was a planet that did not orbit a sun, there was no light to show it. They were excited about the shot they had put together until supervising producer Peter Lauritson asked if they were going to put stars on the left side of the image, not realizing that the absence of stars was caused by the planet. Moore realized they would have to go with something less realistic and cheat by increasing the light levels so that the planet was more noticeable. Dan Curry and John Teska were responsible for the design of the planet's CGI creatures. They took advantage of improvements to LightWave, the software they were using, and created a wild boar-like creature by repurposing the Klingon targ that appeared in the episode Sleeping Dogs. They also designed the true form of the wraith.

== Reception ==
Rogue Planet was first aired in the United States on UPN on March 20, 2002. According to Nielsen Media Research, it received a 3.3/5 rating share among adults. This means it had an average of 4.69 million viewers. Among first run science fiction or fantasy genre shows that week Enterprise came in fourth place behind Smallville, Dark Angel, and Charmed.

Michelle Erica Green of TrekNation was critical of the familiar premise but praised the "interesting camera work and strong performances -- the two biggest things Enterprise has going for it." Aint It Cool News gave the episode 2.5 out of 5 and criticized the episode as "too simplistic" comparing it to past Star Trek episodes, and found the clunky CGI off-putting. Television Without Pity gave the episode a grade C−. Keith DeCandido of Tor.com gave it 3 out of 10, in his 2022 rewatch. He questioned the relevance of setting the episode on a rogue planet, and said there were unexplored story possibilities. DeCandido says the straightforward ending is not even anticlimactic because it is just like "the rest of this dreary, goes-nowhere episode."

Christian Kriticos writing for StarTrek.com says the use of the poetry of William Butler Yeats is more than a plot device, that it teaches us something meaningful about Archer and his drive for exploration, that he is on "a search for something higher; something which, perhaps, can never be reached."

The book Beyond the Final Frontier: An Unauthorised Review of the Trek Universe on Television and Film called it "probably the weakest episode of the season, it's not bad so much as anti-climactic." They criticized the lack of originality and said it could just as easily have been a Star Trek: Voyager episode.

TechRepublic included the episode as number 3 on its list of the 5 worst episodes of Enterprise. A 2016, binge guide by Wired criticized the episode and recommended skipping it entirely. They described it as a "sluggish, slow episode that might just make you want to climb into a shell and never come out."

== Home media release ==
The first home media release of the episode was on VHS in the UK on September 2, 2002. The episodes "Fusion" and "Rogue Planet" were included on the tape. It was first made available in the United States on DVD, as part of the season one box set released May 2005. The Blu-ray (1080p) release of Enterprise was announced in early 2013, and was released in the United States on March 26 with the UK release following on April 1.

== See also ==
- Rogue planets in fiction
