= Bert D'Angelo/Superstar =

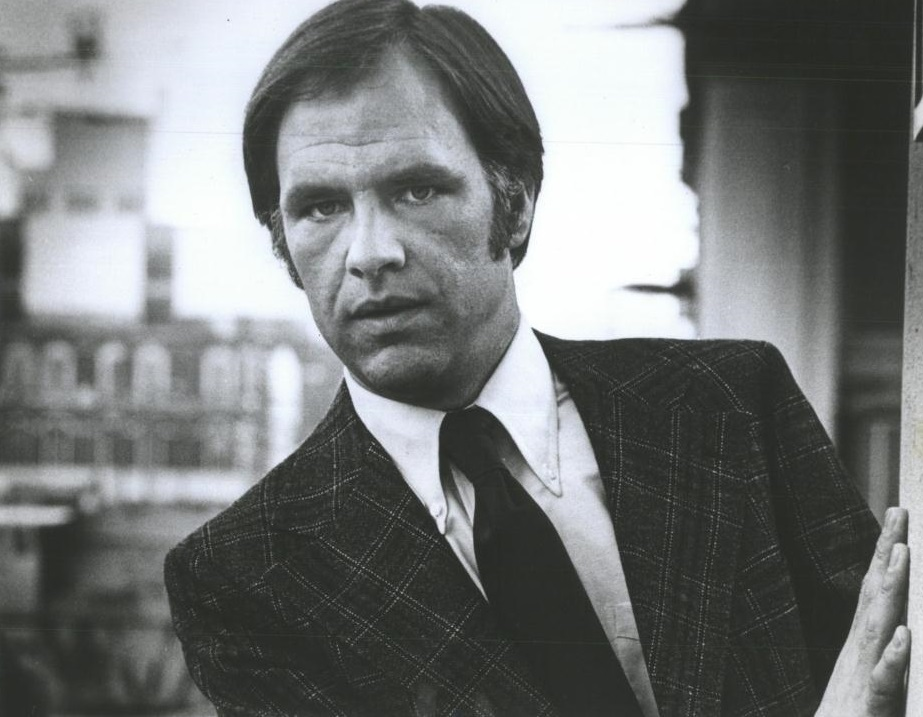
- Inspector Larry Johnson (Robert Pine)
- Starring: Paul Sorvino
- Country of origin: United States
- Original language: English
- No. of seasons: 1
- No. of episodes: 12 (1 unaired)

Production
- Running time: 60 minutes
- Production company: Quinn Martin Productions

Original release
- Network: ABC
- Release: February 21 – July 10, 1976

Bert D'Angelo/Superstar (shown as Bert D'Angelo in Britain) is an American police drama television series that was broadcast by American Broadcasting Company on Saturday Nights from February 21 to July 10, 1976. The series was produced by Quinn Martin.

The series derived from The Streets of San Francisco, although the episode ("Superstar") which introduced the character was first broadcast on March 4, 1976, after the spinoff premiered. It was broadcast in Britain on BBC1 during the summer of 1976 (The Streets of San Francisco was an ITV import).

== Premise ==
Bert D'Angelo was a ten-year veteran of the New York City Police Department transferred to San Francisco, "so as to acquaint the San Francisco Police Department with the way things were done back in New York City". He was involved with a variety of types of cases, including illegal drugs, murders, and robberies.

== Cast ==
- Paul Sorvino as Bert D'Angelo
- Robert Pine as Inspector Larry Johnson
- Dennis Patrick as Captain Jack Breen

== Production ==
The series was "filmed entirely on location in and around San Francisco". Martin was the executive producer. Directors were Harry Falk, Virgil W. Vogel, Michael Caffey, David Friedkin, and William Hale. Writers were Larry Alexander, D. C. Fontana, and Marion Hargrove.

== Critical reception ==
Critic John Camper of the Chicago Daily News found little positive about the program as he wrote, "YOU try to think of something interesting to say about it." He noted about D'Angelo, "With practically no evidence he intuits the entire convoluted murder plot by the end of Act IV".

Dwight Newton, writing in the San Francisco Examiner, compared Bert D'Angelo to the movie Dirty Harry (1971), dubbing D'Angelo "Dirty Bert" because the TV character violated proper procedure like the movie character did. Newton described the show as "similar slop" to the movie and termed the series a "garbage-heap clinker". He praised Sorvino for his performance: "Sorvino imbues his cop role with vitality, finesse, humaneness and, when called upon, great roaring fervor."

== Episodes ==
No.	Title	Original release date
1	"Murder In Velvet"	February 21, 1976
After a woman is murdered, D'Angelo discovers evidence that implicates a close friend in the crime.
2	"Cops Who Sleep Together"	February 28, 1976
An investigation of the death of a newlywed policeman is hampered when his widow, who's also a police officer, seeks revenge.
3	"Men with No Past"	March 6, 1976
Three seemingly ordinary men are murdered in a professional manner, resulting in the discovery by D'Angelo that the killer is a hit man eliminating former government informants.
4	"The Brown Horse Connection"	March 13, 1976
D'Angelo receives help from a Mexico City policewoman as he searches for a bomber who plans to blow up a convention of law enforcement officials.
5	"The Book of Fear"	March 20, 1976
After a young girl is tortured and murdered while trying to escape from a prostitution ring, D'Angelo makes an effort to find the mysterious chief of the operation.
6	"A Noise in the Street"	March 27, 1976
An international hit man and his girlfriend keep a priest hostage while taking refuge in a church.
7	"A Concerned Citizen"	April 3, 1976
A hijacking gang begins murdering, resulting in D'Angelo being assigned to help solve the case before another death occurs.
8	"Flannagan's Fleet"	June 5, 1976
In order to fund the buying of guns and other war supplies, a mercenary group plans to rob several armored cars.
9	"What Kind of Cop Are You?"	June 12, 1976
Investigation of the death of a vagrant becomes a priority when evidence indicates the involvement of organized crime loansharks.
10	"Scag"	June 19, 1976
D'Angelo is in a race with a desperate man to be the first to find a cache of heroin worth more than $1 million.
11	"Serpent's Tooth"	July 10, 1976
Two feuding organized crime families are ready to war with each other unless D'Angelo can find a way to stop it.
12	"Requiem for a Rip-Off"	Unaired
