= Epoch: Evolution =

- Directed by: Ian Watson
- Starring: David Keith; Billy Dee Williams; Angel Boris
- Country of origin: United States
- Original language: English

Production
- Running time: 94 minutes

Original release
- Release: 2003

Epoch: Evolution is the 2003 TV-movie sequel to Epoch, directed by Ian Watson with David Keith reprising his role from the original film.

== Plot ==
Engineer Mason Rand (David Keith) returns to help determine if the mysterious monolith he had studied earlier can be used to help save Earth from destruction, or if it is in fact causing it.

== Cast ==
- David Keith as Dr. Mason Rand
- Billy Dee Williams as Ferguson
- Angel Boris as Sondra
- Brian Thompson as Captain Tower
- Velizar Binev as Father Samuel
- Biliana Petrinska as Major Gordeova
- Atanas Srebrev as Man

== Release ==
Epoch: Evolution premiered as a Sci Fi Pictures original telefilm on the Sci Fi Channel. It was released on DVD on May 4, 2004.
