= The Swarm (Star Trek: Voyager) =

- Star Trek: Voyager episode
- Episode no.: Season 3 Episode 4
- Directed by: Alexander Singer
- Written by: Mike Sussman
- Production code: 149
- Original air date: September 25, 1996

Guest appearances
- Carole Davis – Giuseppina Pentangeli; Steven Houska – Chardis; Robert Picardo – Diagnostic Hologram

Episode chronology
| ← Previous "The Chute" | Next → "False Profits" |
- Star Trek: Voyager season 3

"The Swarm" is the 46th episode of Star Trek: Voyager, the fourth episode of the third season. This was aired on UPN television on September 25, 1996.

The episode follows two separate storylines. In the first one, Voyager must navigate through a region of space inhabited by a highly xenophobic alien race known only as "the Swarm." Any ship that enters space inhabited by these people is never heard of again. In the second, the Doctor begins suffering from memory lapses which leads to the possibility of his entire program breaking down.

== Plot ==
Voyager discovers a ship with only one survivor. It tells of how the aliens covered every square meter of the ship, sucking out all the energy and killing the crew. The alien then dies of his injuries.

Voyager tries to get through the swarm's space but something slows them down. Phaser fire directed at the enemy is rebounded right back at the ship. Ensign Kim identifies a weakness —- each ship is connected in a lattice. Voyager concentrates fire on one ship, destroying it. Dozens of other ships are destroyed, driving the Swarm away.

Meanwhile, the holographic Doctor's program begins to malfunction. Kes and Torres transfer the Doctor to the holodeck and call up the EMH diagnostic program.

The Doctor's program is imminently about to degrade to oblivion. The crew discovers that they have the option of re-initializing the Doctor if it comes down to it, but this would result in the loss of everything he had learned in the past two years.

While the Doctor is fine with this, as he does not wish to sacrifice the health and security of the crew, others, particularly Kes, do not wish to see the man the Doctor had become go away.

The diagnostic program itself is not pleased with the entire situation for many reasons. It notes that the Doctor was supposed to be off-line during its off time, not expanding his program, such as with his opera studies. The extra memory caused by the Doctor's expansion of his program is part of the problem. In fact, EMHs are supposed to only have 1500 hours of operation. The diagnostic program tells of an alternative to rebooting the Doctor entirely, but it involves a layover at McKinley Station. He is informed that the station is on the other side of the galaxy. Later, the diagnostic program expresses frustration over the situation; after all, it is perfectly content being the program it is.

In the end, the diagnostic program willingly sacrifices itself, using its matrices to support the Doctor's failing ones. This means the ship would no longer have a diagnostic system at all but it is better than the alternative, or so it seems. The Doctor is restored but acts exactly as he had when he was first activated. Moments later, while treating Torres's headache, he begins to hum opera.

== Music ==
The Doctor sings "O soave fanciulla", a duet from act 1 of the opera La bohème by Giacomo Puccini, on the holodeck with a holographic re-creation of Giuseppina Pentangeli.

== Releases ==
"The Swarm" was released on LaserDisc in Japan on June 25, 1999, as part of the 3rd season vol.1 set.

"The Swarm" was released on DVD on July 6, 2004 as part of Star Trek Voyager: Complete Third Season, with a Dolby 5.1 surround audio.
