= Terra Nova (Star Trek: Enterprise) =

- Star Trek: Enterprise episode
- Episode no.: Season 1 Episode 6
- Directed by: LeVar Burton
- Story by: Rick Berman; Brannon Braga
- Teleplay by: Antoinette Stella
- Cinematography by: Marvin V. Rush
- Production code: 106
- Original air date: October 24, 2001

Guest appearances
- Erick Avari — Jamin; Mary Carver — Nadet; Brian Jacobs — Athan; Greville Henwood — Akary

Episode chronology
← Previous "Unexpected"	Next → "The Andorian Incident"
- Star Trek: Enterprise season 1

"Terra Nova" is the sixth episode (production #106) of the television series Star Trek: Enterprise, and was written by Brannon Braga and Rick Berman. LeVar Burton served as director for the episode. The episode aired on UPN on October 24, 2001.

Enterprise learns the fate of a human colony not heard from for seventy years. When the crew arrives, they discover unexplained radiation at the site of the colony. Understanding that radiation levels seventy years ago would have been lethal, they find people still there and living underground.

== Plot ==
Enterprise is investigating the first human deep-space colony—Terra Nova, nine years away from Earth at early warp speed. The colony had not been heard from in the last seventy years, following a disagreement with Earth regarding further colony ships. Captain Archer, Ensign Mayweather, Lieutenant Reed, and Sub-Commander T'Pol take a shuttlepod to the surface, where they find a ghost town and radiation that would have been lethal seventy years earlier. Reed then detects a humanoid and gives chase, arriving at a cave entrance—inside Archer and Reed make first contact, but Reed is soon shot and captured.

Back on Enterprise, T'Pol reveals that the attackers were human, not alien. Archer notes fifty-two bio-signs in the cave network including Reed's. He decides to negotiate, and takes Doctor Phlox down to the surface. Two colonists, Jamin and Nadet, bring them to Reed, who is stable. Phlox also finds that Nadet, Jamin's mother, has lung cancer, and she is taken back to be cured. While being treated, T'Pol shows her records that the "poison rain" was caused by an asteroid strike that had sent radioactive ore up into the atmosphere and not by any treachery by Earth. Furthermore, the radiation stopped any distress calls from reaching Earth. Archer explains that Novans and humans are actually the same species. The adults had eventually died of radiation poisoning, but the young children had built up an immunity to it and had survived by fleeing underground. However, the radiation is beginning to contaminate their underground water sources, resulting in Nadet's cancer and threatening their lives.

Archer and Phlox try to convince them to leave, since Phlox is unable to manufacture an antidote and it will be years before the radiation levels are safe again. Archer shows Nadet a photograph of a family group on Terra Nova. She identifies them as human and says that the photo was taken before the poison rain; the young girl is named Bernadette. Nadet makes the connection and realizes that she is in fact Bernadette, her full name having been long forgotten, but Jamin reminds Archer that Reed will be killed if they are not returned soon. T'Pol argues that relocation to Earth would save their lives but destroy their Novan culture, so Archer has the crew search for another solution. Finally, Archer gains the Novans' trust by rescuing one of them from a well, and persuades the remaining colonists to relocate to similar caverns on the planet's unaffected southern hemisphere.

== Production ==
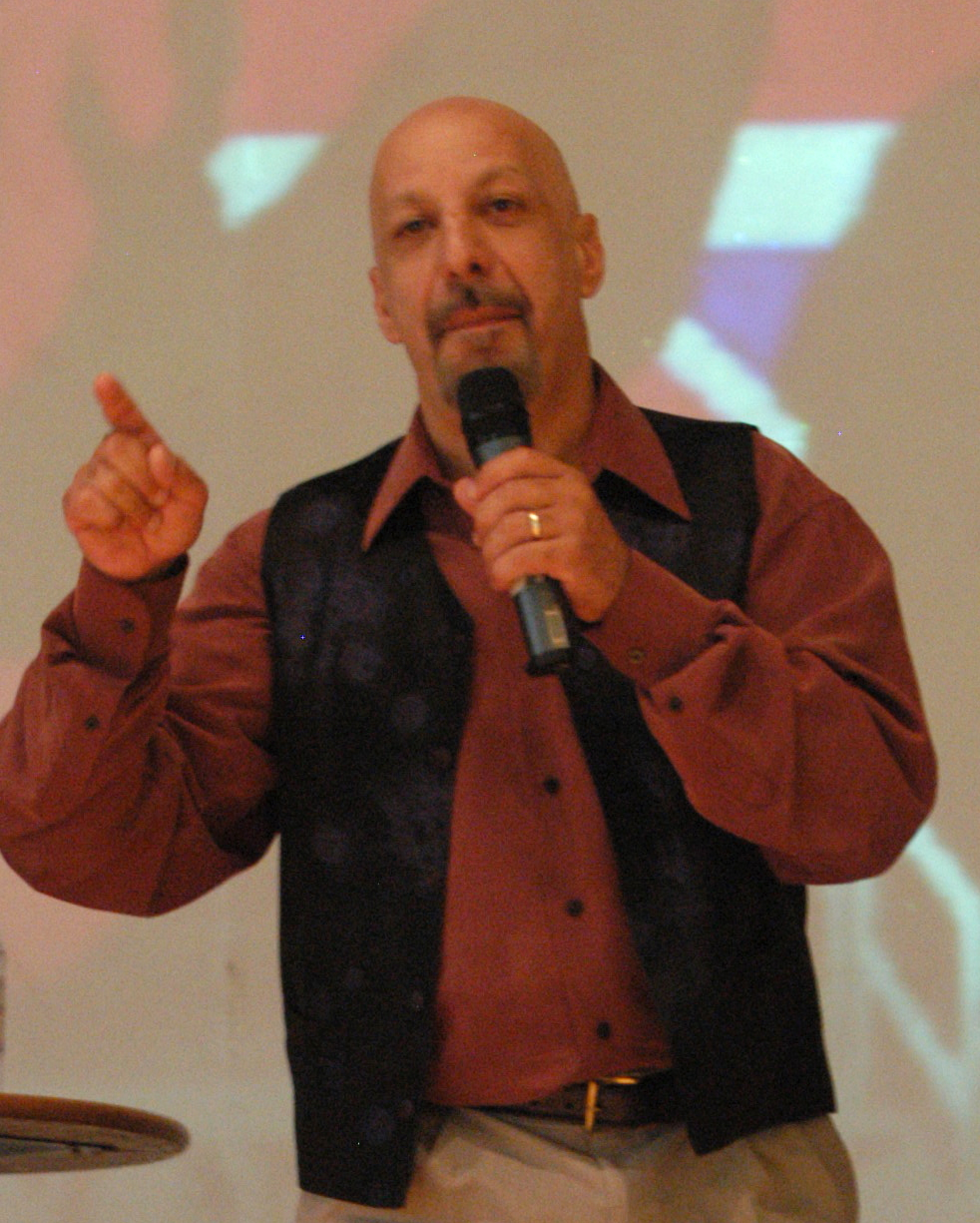
Guest star Erick Avari.

"Terra Nova" marked the first time that a former Star Trek actor directed an episode of Enterprise: LeVar Burton. Burton previously appeared as Geordi La Forge in Star Trek: The Next Generation, and directed episodes of TNG, as well as Star Trek: Deep Space Nine and Star Trek: Voyager—he would go on to direct 26 Star Trek episodes including nine from Enterprise, totalling the most of any former Star Trek cast member (though Roxann Dawson, a former cast member on Voyager, directed more episodes of Enterprise, overseeing 10 of the show's 98 episodes). This episode was the sole writing credit for Antoinette Stella, who served as a producer for the first half of season one.

Guest star Erick Avari was known for his appearance in the film Stargate and TV series. Avari previously appeared in Star Trek as a Klingon (B'iJik, "Unification") and a Bajoran (Vedek Yarka, "Destiny").

== Reception ==
Terra Nova was first aired in the United States on UPN on October 24, 2001. According to Nielsen Media Research, it received a 5.1 rating share among adults. This means it had an average of 8.4 million viewers.

Sunny Lee of Entertainment Weekly gave the episode a negative review. Lee criticized the makeup; the Novans were supposed to look alien but their "faces look normally human with a dab here and there of yellow and blue powder." Lee also found it strange that Captain Archer would leave a crewman behind, and found the moral message of the story overly simplistic. Aint It Cool News gave it 2.5 out of 5. He criticized the script: "I was hoping for a better explanation as to why the early Novans were so against the idea of a second wave of colonization" and "the writers need to work on their epilogues; “Enterprise” episodes all seem to end a little too abruptly." Michelle Erica Green said it was "not a great episode" although it was an improvement over the previous episode "Unexpected". She criticized the episode for being predictable and for its similarities to the Star Trek: Voyager episode "Friendship One". Green was positive about the character development of Captain Archer, and said the other performances were "uniformly fine", but noted the lack of character development of the supporting cast. Jason Bates IGN rated it 3 out of 5. He called it "BORING!" and "Where's the overarching storylines and character development that is (theoretically) going to keep me tuning in week after week?" Keith DeCandido Tor.com gave it 4 out of 10.

Brannon Braga said this was his least favorite episode of Enterprise, and called it boring. Braga went on to work on an unrelated series also called Terra Nova.

TechRepublic included the episode on its list of the 5 worst episodes of Enterprise.

== Home media ==
This episode was part of Enterprise season one, which was released in high definition on Blu-ray disc on March 26, 2013; it has 1080p video and a DTS-HD Master Audio sound track.
