= Robert Pine =

American actor (born 1941)

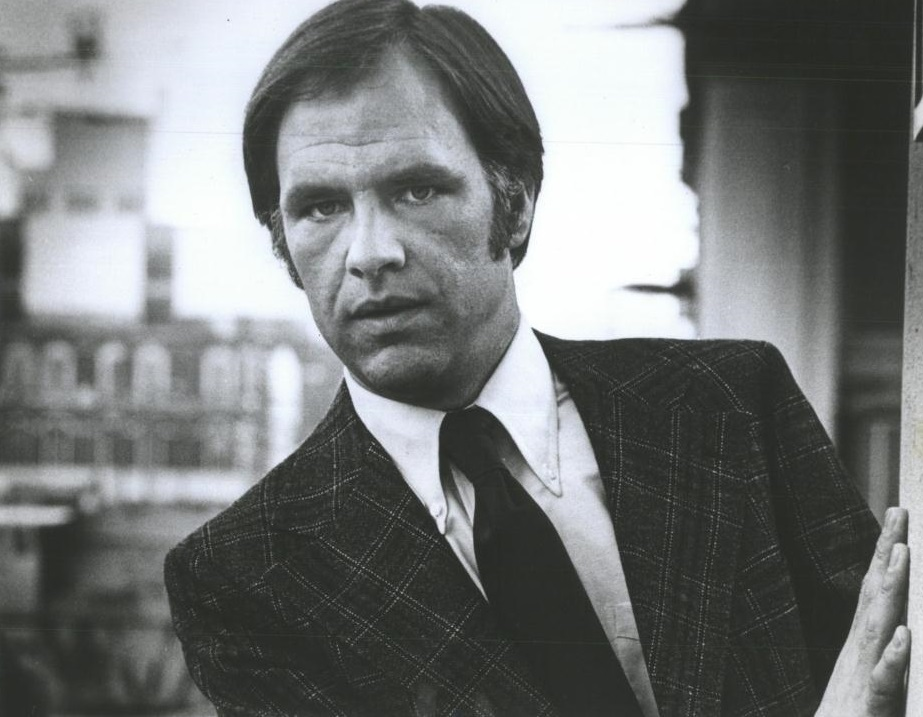
- Pine in Bert D'Angelo/Superstar in 1976
- Born: Granville Whitelaw Pine; July 10, 1941 (age 85); New York City, U.S.
- Occupation: Actor
- Years active: 1964–present
- Known for: CHiPs
- Spouse: Gwynne Gilford (m. 1969)
- Children: 2, including Chris
- Relatives: Anne Gwynne (mother-in-law)
- Website: robertpine.com

Robert Pine (born Granville Whitelaw Pine; July 10, 1941) is an American actor. He is best known as Sgt. Joseph Getraer on the television series CHiPs (1977–1983). Including CHiPs, Pine has appeared in over 400 episodes of various television shows.

== Life and career ==
Pine was born in New York City on July 10, 1941, the son of Virginia (née Whitelaw) and Granville Martin Pine, a patent attorney. He graduated from Ohio Wesleyan University in 1963. He is married to Gwynne Gilford, who appeared in several episodes of CHiPs as Betty Getraer, the wife of Pine's character. They have two children, actors Chris and Katie.

Pine arrived in Hollywood in 1964, where he learned to ride horses because as a contract player with Universal Studios, he was frequently featured in westerns. Pine remained under contract with Universal until 1967. During his career he starred on the soap opera Days of Our Lives as Walter Coleman and had guest appearances in many American television shows, including Gunsmoke, Lost in Space, The Silent Force, The Wild Wild West, Barnaby Jones, Lou Grant, and Knight Rider. On Magnum, P.I., he appeared as Thomas Magnum's father in a flashback episode. From 1977 to 1983, he starred on NBC's CHiPs for six seasons as Sgt. Joseph Getraer, the gruff immediate supervisor to the show's two protagonists.

In the late 1980s, Pine guest-starred as Peter Morris, Zack's father, in an episode of Good Morning, Miss Bliss. That show went on to become Saved by the Bell. In the early 1990s, Pine portrayed two villains. For California Dreams, he played a wealthy racist who sabotages his daughter's friendship with drummer Tony (William James Jones). For the CBS Schoolbreak Special Big Boys Don't Cry, he played a pedophile who molests his two nephews. In 1994, he guest-starred as Bart Tupelo on CBS' Harts of the West comedy/western starring Beau Bridges and Lloyd Bridges. He reprised his role as Getraer in the 1998 TNT TV movie CHiPs '99.

For Star Trek: Voyager, he guest starred as the Akritirian Ambassador Liria in the Season 3 episode "The Chute". For Star Trek: Enterprise, he guest-starred as Vulcan Captain Tavin in the Season 1 episode "Fusion". Among his other credits are Six Feet Under, Beverly Hills 90210, and Match Game. In September 2013, he appeared as Grandpa Jack in Kaiser Permanente's television ad "Thrive - Perfectly Ordinary". He was the voice of the Bishop of Arendelle in Disney's 2013 animated movie Frozen.

== Filmography ==
=== Film ===
Year	Title	Role	Notes
1966	Gunpoint	Mitchell	
1966	Out of Sight	Greg	
1966	Munster, Go Home!	Roger Moresby	
1967	The Young Warriors	Foley	
1968	Journey to Shiloh	Collins	
1968	The Counterfeit Killer	Ed	
1973	One Little Indian	Lt. Cummins	
1974	The Bears and I	John McCarten	
1975	The Day of the Locust	Apprentice #1	
1977	Empire of the Ants	Larry Graham	
1979	The Apple Dumpling Gang Rides Again	Lt. Jim Ravencroft	
1985	Papa Was a Preacher	'Papa' Porter	
1988	Aviel	Father	
1990	The Ladies on Sweet Street	Lieutenant Spicer	
1991	Rover Dangerfield	Duke (voice)	
1992	On the Way Home	Dad	Video short
1995	The Little CHP	Sgt. Getraer	
1996	Independence Day	President's Chief of Staff	
1996	Mercenary	Special Agent Ranklin	
1996	The Best Revenge		
1997	Below Utopia	Uncle Wilson	
1997	A Guy Walks Into a Bar	Dad	Short film
1998	Chocolate for Breakfast		
1998	The Adventures of Ragtime	Fred Waters	
1999	But I'm a Cheerleader	Mr. Eaton	
1999	Kiss Toledo Goodbye	Oz	
2000	Mach 2	Captain Roman	
2000	Screenland Drive	Dad	
2001	All You Need	Earl Sabistan	
2001	The Hit	Levine	Direct-to-video
2003	Confidence	Mr. Lewis	
2004	Clipping Adam	Principal Briggs	
2005	Confession	Senator Givens	
2005	Red Eye	Bob Taylor	
2005	Yesterday's Dreams	Mr. Regal	
2006	Paved with Good Intentions	Brad Ridgmont	
2007	Dead Write	Christopher	
2008	Lakeview Terrace	Captain Wentworth	
2008	No Man's Land: The Rise of Reeker	Sheriff McAllister	
2010	Reunited	Frank Lechner	
2010	Small Town Saturday Night	John Ryan	
2013	Jobs	Edgar S. Woolard Jr.	
2013	Decoding Annie Parker	Dr. Frank	
2013	Frozen	Bishop (voice)	
2016	Mother's Day	Earl	
2016	Diani & Devine Meet the Apocalypse	Dog Walker	
2017	The Landing	Pete Pellarin	
2018	Con Man	Judge	
2018	Song of Back and Neck	David Trolleycar	
2019	Wish Man	Sgt. Eddie Newman	
2019	Real. Live. Girl.	Norman	Short film
2019	The Last Full Measure	Meredith Huffman	

=== Television ===
Year	Title	Role	Notes
1964	Kraft Suspense Theatre	Denny Wentworth	Episode: "A Lion Amongst Men"
1964–1965	Broadside	Various	4 episodes
1964–1966	Bob Hope Presents the Chrysler Theatre	Lt. Brown / New Flier / John	3 episodes
1965	Convoy		Episode: "Sink U-116!"
1965–1969	The Virginian	Various	4 episodes
1966	Run for Your Life	Allan Frazer	Episode: "The Cruel Fountain"
1966	Pistols 'n' Petticoats	Boy Bunnoy	Episode: "Sir Richard of Wretched"
1967	Lost in Space	Craig	Episode: "Visit to a Hostile Planet"
1967	Death Valley Days	Sailor	Episode: "Shanghai Kelly's Birthday Party"
1967	The Lucy Show	Steve Josephs	Episode: "Lucy Gets Her Diploma"
1968–1973	Gunsmoke	Various	4 episodes
1969	The Guns of Will Sonnett	Kit Torrey	Episode: "Join the Army"
1969	The Wild Wild West	Lieutenant Murray	Episode: "The Night of the Pistoleros"
1969	Bonanza	Steed Butler	Episode: "The Running Man"
1969–1971	Medical Center	Jimmy Cole / Tod Marriott	2 episodes
1970	The High Chaparral	Lt. Jason Adams	Episode: "The Lieutenant"
1970	Mannix	Eric Beckworth / Mike Gaynor	Episode: "The Search for Darrell Andrews"
1970	The Brotherhood of the Bell	Phillip Dunning	TV movie
1971	The Silent Force	Johnny Davis	2 episodes
1971	Incident in San Francisco		TV movie
1971	Dan August	Lt. Pete O'Connell	Episode: "Bullet for a Hero"
1972	The Mod Squad	Jay Turner ("Yesterday's Ashes") / Ernie Holland ("No More Oak Leaves for Ernie Holland")	2 episodes
1972	The Wonderful World of Disney	Lt. Larson	Episode: "The High Flying Spy: Part 1"
1972–1973	Love, American Style	Jim (segment "Love and the Big Top") / Mac Gelman (segment "Love and the Girlish Groom")	2 episodes
1972–1974	The F.B.I.	Vaughn Teller / Doug Waters	2 episodes
1972–1976	Cannon	Sheriff Jeff Blake / Paul Wilson / Dep. Sheriff Ward Freeman	3 episodes
1973	Incident on a Dark Street	Paul Hamilton Jr	TV movie
1973–1977	Barnaby Jones	Jim Rhodes / Bradley Fredericks / Catlin	3 episodes
1974	The Manhunter	Charles Wyland	Episode: "The Deadly Brothers"
1976	Bert D'Angelo/Superstar	Inspector Larry Johnson	6 episodes
1976–1977	Charlie's Angels	Andy Price / Dr. Conlan	2 episodes
1977	The Bob Newhart Show	Mel	Episode: "Desperate Sessions"
1977	Tales of the Unexpected	Lieutenant Stevens	Episode: "No Way Out"
1977–1983	CHiPs	Sgt. Joseph Getraer	139 episodes
1979	Lou Grant	Burt	Episode: "Denial"
1980	Enola Gay: The Men, the Mission, the Atomic Bomb	Captain William 'Deke' Parsons	TV movie
1980	Dan August: Murder, My Friend	Lt. Pete O'Connell	TV movie edited from two episodes, including "Bullet for a Hero"
1982	Mysterious Two	Arnold Brown	TV movie
1982	Insight	Brad	Episode: "Matchpoint"
1982	The Love Boat	Reverend David Ruland	Episode: "The Man in the Iron Shorts/The Victims/Heavens to Betsy"
1983	Lottery!		Episode: "Kansas City: Protected Winner"
1983	Hotel	Paul Manning	Episode: "Christmas"
1983–1988	Magnum, P.I.	Lieutenant Thomas Sullivan Magnum III	3 episodes
1984	The Master	Beaumont	Episode: "Fat Tuesday"
1984	Scarecrow and Mrs. King	Sinclair	Episode: "Brunettes Are In"
1984	Family Ties	Dean Ian McCall	Episode: "Karen II, Alex 0"
1985	Crazy Like a Fox		Episode: "Premium for Murder"
1985	Knight Rider	Cyrus Oakes	Episode: "Burial Ground"
1986	Dallas	Psychiatrist	Episode: "Dire Straits"
1986	Dynasty	Lt. Calder	2 episodes
1986–1996	Murder, She Wrote	Various	5 episodes
1987	ALF	Father	Episode: "A Little Bit of Soap"
1987	Days of Our Lives	Walter Coleman	Episode #1.5411
1987	Hoover vs. The Kennedys	John F. Kennedy	2 episodes
1987–1990	Matlock	State Sen. Jeffrey Paul / Sam Dolan	2 episodes
1988	Rags to Riches	Ralph Huntington	Episode: "Sweet Sixteen"
1988	Good Morning, Miss Bliss	Peter Morris	Episode: "Parents and Teachers"
1988–2001	The Bold and the Beautiful	Stephen Logan	
1989	Mancuso, F.B.I.	Robert Cranage	Episode: "Classified"
1990	Babies	Loren	TV movie
1990	Life Goes On	Wayne Oslot	Episode: "Corky and the Dolphins"
1990	Lifestories	Dan Drabowski	Episode: "Beverly Whitestone, Dan Drabowski, Sadie Maxwell, Lois Barnes"
1991	MacGyver	Ralph Jerico	Episode: "Jerico Games"
1991	Jake and the Fatman	Art	Episode: "Pretty Baby"
1991	L.A. Law	Bruce Fairchild	Episode: "Mutinies on the Banzai"
1991	P.S. I Luv U	Gordon Ross	Episode: "Where There's a Will, There's a Dani"
1992	Quantum Leap	Ted	Episode: "The Play's the Thing - September 9, 1969"
1992	Are You Lonesome Tonight		TV movie
1992	Civil Wars	Jerry Tellman	Episode: "Mob Psychology"
1992	California Dreams	Ken Blanchard	Episode: "Guess Who's Coming to Brunch"
1993	FBI: The Untold Stories		Episode: "Kill for Love"
1993	CBS Schoolbreak Special	Paul Walters	Episode: "Big Boys Don't Cry"
1993	Picket Fences	Bill McGrath	Episode: "Fetal Attraction"
1993	Baywatch	Dr. Bonann	2 episodes
1993	Bodies of Evidence	Hal Bartell	Episode: "The Formula"
1993	Prophet of Evil: The Ervil LeBaron Story		TV movie
1994	Harts of the West	Bart Tupelo	Episode: "You Got to Have Heart"
1994	Tonya & Nancy: The Inside Story	Network President	TV movie
1994	One West Waikiki	Mr. Bryan	Episode: "'Til Death Do Us Part"
1995	Models Inc.	Mr. Owens	Episode: "Sometimes a Great Commotion"
1995	Renegade	Judge Doug LeMay	Episode: "Sawed-Off Shotgun Wedding"
1995	Murder One	Howard Resnick	Episode: "Chapter Nine"
1996	Pacific Blue		Episode: "All Jammed Up"
1996	Star Trek: Voyager	Ambassador Liria	Episode: "The Chute"
1996	Silk Stalkings	Roger Sterling	Episode: "When She Was Bad"
1997	Moloney	Douglas Parker	Episode: "Loved and Lost"
1997	Sins of the Mind	Edward	TV movie
1997	Chicago Hope	Frank Sardos	Episode: "The Lung and the Restless"
1998	Beverly Hills, 90210	Harold Kay	Episode: "Law and Disorder"
1998	Michael Hayes		Episode: "Gotterdammerung"
1998	The Practice	John Monahan	Episode: "Rhyme and Reason"
1998	CHiPs '99	CHP Commissioner Joseph Getraer	TV movie
1998	Nothing Sacred		Episode: "Holy Words"
2000	The West Wing	Greer	Episode: "20 Hours in L.A."
2000–2001	Son of the Beach	Governor Thomas	2 episodes
2001	JAG	Capt. Childs	Episode: "Collision Course"
2001	Providence	Congressman	Episode: "Rule Number One"
2001	The Division	Theodore's Dad	Episode: "The First Hit's Free, Baby"
2001	Black Scorpion	Mayor Artie Worth	13 episodes
2001	Lost Voyage	Mike Kaplan	TV movie
2001–2002	Any Day Now		2 episodes
2002	Even Stevens	Specs Richardson	Episode: "Tight End in Traction"
2002	Star Trek: Enterprise	Tavin	Episode: "Fusion"
2002	Strong Medicine	Mr. Jurgenson	Episode: "Heartbeat"
2002–2005	Six Feet Under	Basil	2 episodes
2003	Half & Half	Senator Scranton	Episode: "The Big Sexy Shame Episode"
2003	Audrey's Rain	Reverend Cole	TV movie
2003	24	Secretary of Agriculture	3 episodes
2003	Rocket Power	Santa Peterson (voice)	Episode: "A Rocket X-mas"
2003–2017	NCIS	Ben / Committee Chairman	2 episodes
2004	The D.A.	John Carlson Sr.	Episode: "The People vs. Oliver C. Handley"
2004	Without a Trace	Roger Toland	Episode: "Shadows"
2004	The Long Shot	Douglas McCloud	TV movie
2004	Helter Skelter	Judge Keene	TV movie
2004	Joan of Arcadia	Mr. Baker	Episode: "Wealth of Nations"
2005	Landslide	Donald Richardson	TV movie
2005	Avatar: The Last Airbender	Fisherman (voice)	Episode: "The Storm"
2005	Curb Your Enthusiasm	Ben Hogan	Episode: "The End"
2006	Criminal Minds	Doug Gregory	Episode: "Charm and Harm"
2006	Big Love	Stuart Kimball	Episode: "Where There's a Will"
2006	Vanished	Curtis McNeal	Episode: "The Tunnel"
2006	Cold Case	Carl Bradley	Episode: "The Key"
2007	All I Want for Christmas	Arthur Nelson	TV movie
2007	Dirty Sexy Money	The Bishop	Episode: "The Nutcracker"
2007	Journeyman	Dennis Ambaucher	Episode: "Home by Another Way"
2007	Love's Unfolding Dream	Dr. Micah Jackson	TV movie
2007	The Singles Table	Stephanie's Father	Episode: "Pilot"
2008	The Young and the Restless	Jim	2 episodes
2008	The Riches		Episode: "The Last Temptation of Wayne"
2008	Players at the Poker Palace	Bartender	(TV Series short)
2008	The Clown Project	Boob's Father	Episode: "Boob Visits His Parents!"
2008	General Hospital: Night Shift	Mr. Whitlow	Episode: "Brothers & Sisters"
2008	Leverage	Congressman Jenkins	Episode: "The Homecoming Job"
2009	Saving Grace	Dr. Benjamin Putnam	Episode: "Am I Gonna Die Today?"
2009	Castle	Gerry Finnegan	Episode: "Fool Me Once..."
2009–2010	The Office	Gerald Halpert	Episodes: "Niagara", "Christening"
2010	The Defenders	Judge Bronson	Episode: "Las Vegas v. Reid"
2011	The Mentalist	Mr. Mitchell	Episode: "Bloodsport"
2011	CSI: Crime Scene Investigation	Dr. Corey	Episode: "Targets of Obsession"
2011	Big Time Rush	J.D.	2 episodes
2011	Eagleheart	Sebastian	Episode: "Danger: Mountain Lions"
2011	The Event	Chief Justice	Episode: "Us or Them"
2011	Franklin & Bash	Duncan Morrow	Episode: "You Can't Take It with You"
2011	Parks and Recreation	Herb	Episode: "End of the World"
2011	House	Mickey's Father	Episode: "Dead & Buried"
2012	Desperate Housewives	Dr. Delson	Episode: "Get Out of My Life"
2012	Private Practice	Jim Wallace	Episode: "Good Grief"
2012	Matchmaker Santa	Jack Tisdale	TV movie
2013	Granite Flats	Towne	Episode: "Pilot"
2013	Bones	Reggie	Episode: "The Party in the Pants"
2014	Christmas Under Wraps	Henry Brunell	TV movie
2014–2015	Finding Carter	Buddy	6 episodes
2016	Grey's Anatomy	Vincent	Episode: "You're Gonna Need Someone on Your Side"
2016	The Middle	Mr. Travers	Episode: "Not Mother's Day"
2016	Timeless	Old Wayne Ellis	Episode: "Space Race"
2016–2017	Graves	Senator Walsh	2 episodes
2017	It's Always Sunny in Philadelphia	Jack Mara	Episode: "A Cricket's Tale"
2017	Veep	President Stevenson	Episode: "Library"
2017	Angie Tribeca	Larry Sniglet	Episode: "Hey, I'm Solvin' Here!"
2017	Romance at Reindeer Lodge	Chris	TV movie
2017–2020	Elena of Avalor	Octavio (voice)	4 episodes
2018	Superstore	Walter	Episode: "Target"
2018	Ghosted	Michael Jennifer	Episode: "The Article"
2018	Charmed	Professor Warner Thaine / Taydeus	Episode: "Pilot"
2018	Kaplan's Korner	Will Freedman	5 episodes
2019	The Cool Kids	Richard	Episode: "Indecent Proposal"
2019	Pearson	Thomas Lauder	Episode: "The Donor"
2022	Magnum P.I.	Danny Braddock	2 episodes
2022	9-1-1: Lone Star	Walter Strand	Episode: "Shift-Less"
2022	Five Days at Memorial	Dr. Horace Baltz	

=== Video games ===
- SOCOM: Confrontation as VIP 3
- Star Wars: The Old Republic as Master Orgus Din
- Bionic Commando as Patrick Armstrong
- Anarchy Reigns as Maximillian Caxton
