= The Andorian Incident =

- Star Trek: Enterprise episode
- Episode no.: Season 1 Episode 7
- Directed by: Roxann Dawson
- Story by: Rick Berman; Brannon Braga; Fred Dekker
- Teleplay by: Fred Dekker
- Production code: (40358-007) 107
- Original air date: October 31, 2001

Guest appearances
- Jeffrey Combs as Commander Shran; Bruce French as Vulcan Elder; Steven Dennis as Tholos; Jeff Ricketts as Keval; Richard Tanner as Vulcan Initiate; Jamie McShane as Tactical Crewman

Episode chronology
← Previous "Terra Nova"	Next → "Breaking the Ice"
- Star Trek: Enterprise season 1

"The Andorian Incident" is the seventh episode (production #107) of the television series Star Trek: Enterprise, and was written by Brannon Braga, Fred Dekker and Rick Berman. Roxann Dawson served as director for the episode. The episode aired on UPN on October 31, 2001. As one of the most significant of the first-season episodes, the events of "The Andorian Incident" would continue to resonate into the third and fourth seasons. This would, in particular, affect Sub-Commander T'Pol and her family.

Captain Archer and Commander Tucker, after finding the Vulcan star maps incomplete, talk Sub-Commander T'Pol into taking a trip to P'Jem, a Vulcan monastery. When they arrive there, they find the monastery has unwelcome guests: the Andorians.

== Plot ==
Captain Archer tells Sub-Commander T'Pol that he had found a remote outpost on a planet a few light years off their current heading, and that he would like to visit this 3000-year-old Vulcan monastery, called P'Jem. En route, T'Pol describes it as an ancient retreat, a place for kolinahr and peaceful meditation. She also explains the strict visit protocols—they should not speak to anyone unless spoken to first, nor touch any relics. When they arrive at P'Jem, a Vulcan elder tries to send the away team away, but Archer notices the reflected form of an armed intruder. Although they manage to subdue him, they are quickly captured by a larger group of armed Andorian Imperial Guards, led by Commander Shran.

Shran interrogates Archer, asking if they have brought more surveillance equipment for the Vulcans. The Andorians lock up the away team with the Vulcan monks, who explain that the Andorians, neighbors of Vulcan, believe that P'Jem conceals a long-range sensor array, and the arrival of T'Pol and Enterprise has unfortunately amplified their suspicions. When Enterprise attempts to contact the away team, Shran warns them not to interfere and destroys their communicators. During interrogation, wrongly disbelieving Archer's protestations of ignorance, the Andorians beat him.

Seeing Archer, the monks relent and take Commander Tucker to an ancient transmitter in the catacombs. After repairing the device, Archer manages to send a signal to Enterprise to tell them to wait. Soon, Lieutenant Reed and a security team transport into the tunnels, taking out most of the Andorians with explosive charges and phaser fire. Shran escapes into the Reliquary, where a firefight reveals a large modern door. Archer opens it, revealing a high-tech sensor chamber. With the Vulcan deception exposed, Archer lets the Andorians go with T'Pol's palm scanner as evidence of the installation. Shran remarks that he is now in Archer's debt.

== Production ==
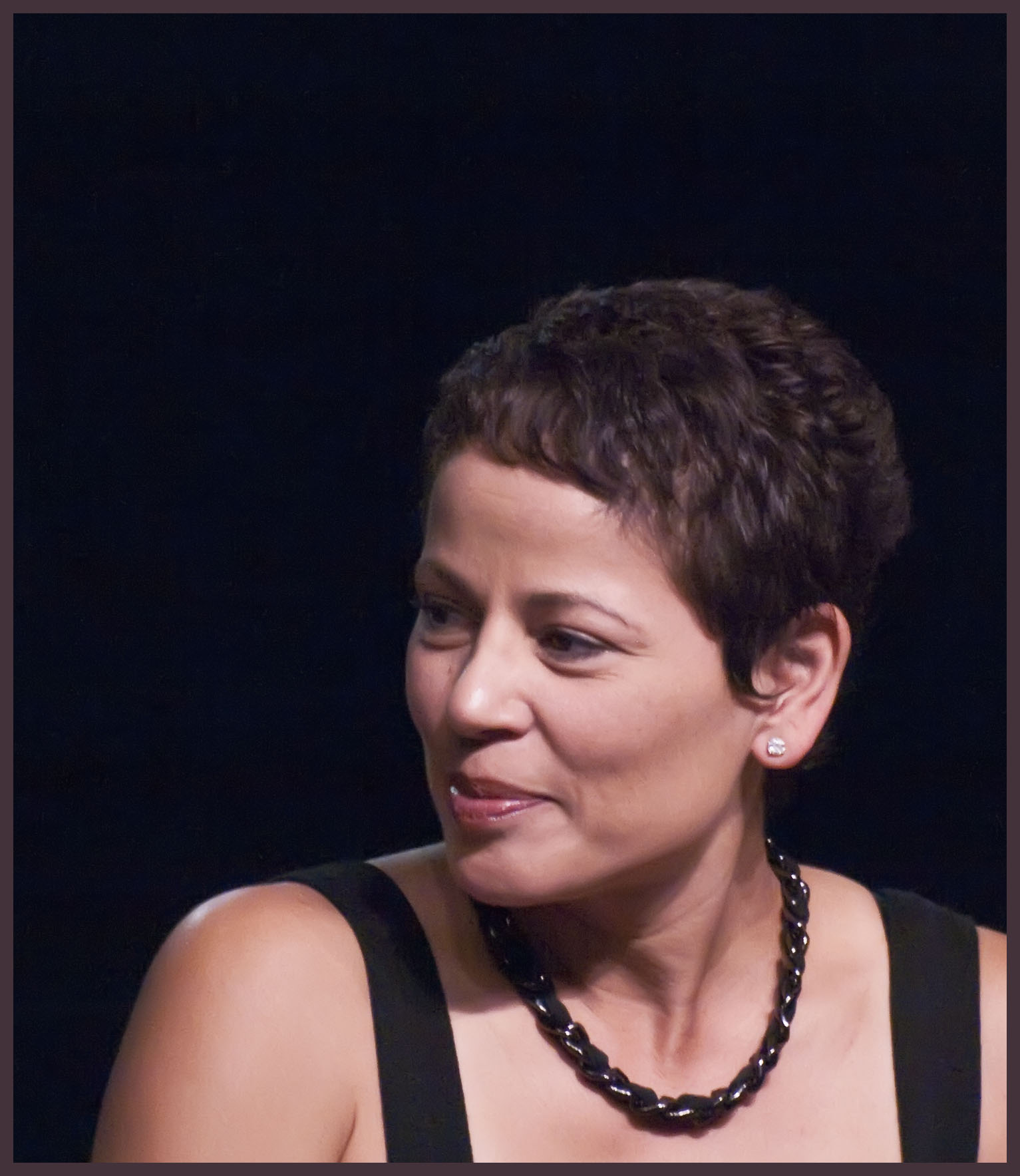
This was the first of ten episodes of Enterprise directed by Roxann Dawson

This episode was directed by Roxann Dawson, known for portraying engineer B'Elanna Torres on Star Trek: Voyager. At the wrap party for Voyager, Rick Berman told her she would be directing on Enterprise. This was the first of ten episodes of Enterprise that she directed, and said she enjoyed the experience of making the episode as well as the story it told. Consulting producer and writer Fred Dekker explained that the idea for the episode came from Rick Berman and Brannon Braga, and together three of them broke down the premise into story. The message of the story was that "too much religion and politics, combined together, is self-serving and cloaked in subterfuge." Brannon Braga said they succeeded in taking "the goofiest aliens from the original" and making them believable and even threatening. He emphasized the importance of casting, and having Jeffrey Combs in the role of the Andorian Commander Shran, someone "you know is going to nail it and bring it dimension [...] Plus, the fans love him." Production designer Herman Zimmerman described "The Andorian Incident" as the most challenging episode of season one with the exception of the pilot, "Broken Bow", because of the volume of work that was required to build the Vulcan monastery of P'Jem.

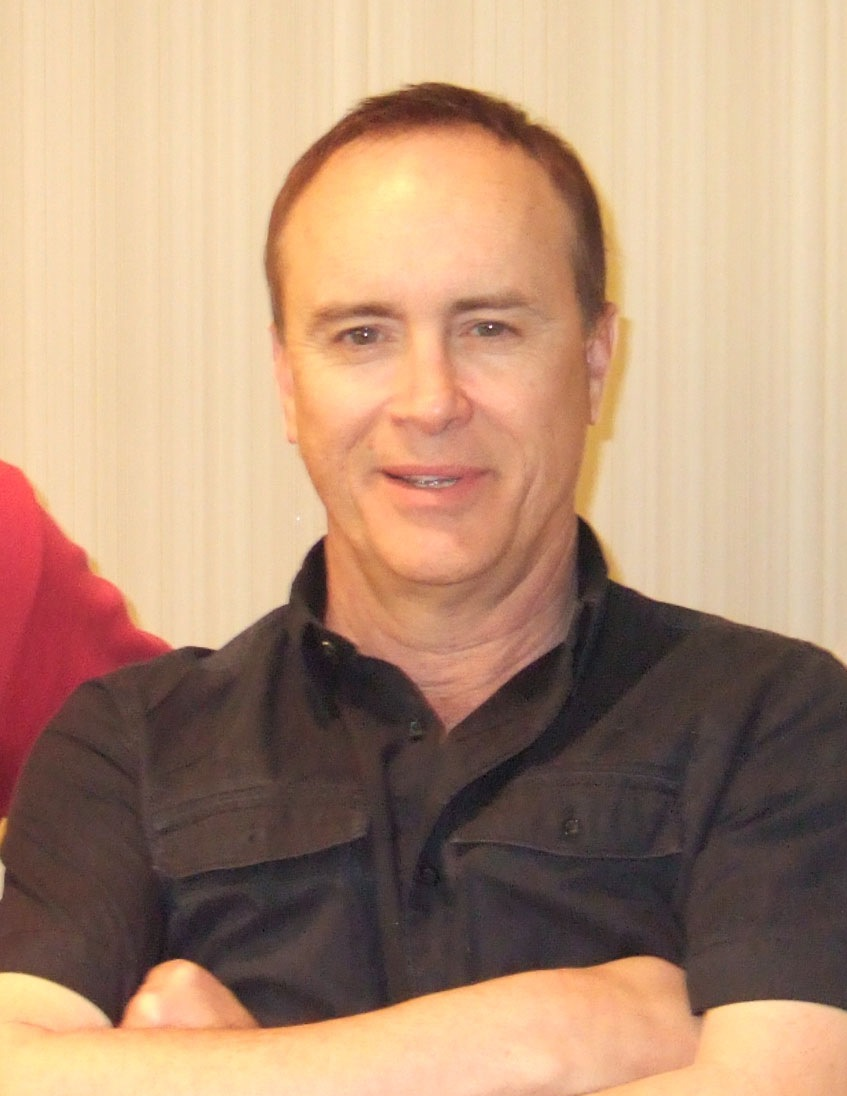
Jeffrey Combs makes his first appearance as the Andorian Commander Shran.

Jeffrey Combs plays the Andorian Commander Shran. Combs had previously appeared in Star Trek: Deep Space Nine as several characters such as Weyoun and the Ferengi Brunt. Combs was offered a guest starring role without having to audition. Before accepting, he wanted to know more, and was told the character was an Andorian and that he would not die at the end of the episode. Combs said the role was a gift, as Shran allowed him to play a very different kind of character: "I got to play a captain, someone with a real chip on his shoulder" and he imagined James Cagney as the basis for his character, "a tough little guy who holds his ground, and you've got to go through him, not around him." Dawson praised the cast; about Combs performance as Shran, she said: "I think it established them as a permanent colour on this show - he's truly great" and of Bakula as Captain Archer she said "Scott Bakula is a fabulous dream. He sets the bar high and the cast follow him. The cast is extremely strong." Dawson had reservations about the Andorians, wanting them to be more believable and threatening than in the original series. She praised Combs, saying: "He was wonderful to work with," and "He really created an extraordinary character there, didn't he?"

== Broadcasts ==
This episode was first broadcast on UPN on October 31, 2001. According to Nielsen Media Research, it received a 4.5/7 rating share among adults. This means it had an average of 7.19 million viewers. The ratings drop was due to competition from the World series baseball coverage on Fox at the same time.

This episode was streamed for free on April 5, 2021, as part of the First Contact Day event on Startrek.com, along with several other episodes and roundtable discussions with Star Trek actors.

== Reception ==
Entertainment Weekly gave the episode a positive review, and enjoyed the revelation at the end: "every series makes a valiant attempt at a surprise. But the results are rarely as successful" [as this]. IGN rated it 3 out of 5. Keith DeCandido of Tor.com gave it eight out of ten in his 2022 rewatch, and wrote: "this is a fantastic episode of Enterprise, doing exactly the sort of thing a prequel can do well." He also praises the actors, particularly Blalock for her restrained and conflicted performance.

SyFy Portal ranked the episode 38 out of the 40 greatest Star Trek episodes, and said episodes like this revealed the show's early potential, but that was not fulfilled with any consistency until Manny Coto and Season 4. In 2016, The Hollywood Reporter ranked "The Andorian Incident" the 100th best Star Trek episode, noting how it established the story for the Andorians and Vulcans in the series. In 2016, Empire ranked this the 36th best of the 700 plus Star Trek television episodes.

In their binge watch guide, Wired recommended this episode as one to watch, calling it an example of "showing things that fans had long wanted to see". In a 2015 interview with some of the show's cast, SyFy recommended this episode as an Enterprise cast favorite. In 2016, Treknews.net had "The Andorian Incident" ranked as one of the top ten episodes of Enterprise; they note how Captain Archer must deal with an Andorian, Shran, who is introduced in this episode. In 2016, TrekNews.net rated it ninth on their top ten essential episodes of Enterprise. In 2021, The Digital Fix said this was the best episode in season one of Enterprise.

== Home media ==
This episode was released as part of Enterprise season one, which was released in high definition on Blu-ray disc on March 26, 2013; it has 1080p video and a DTS-HD Master Audio sound track.

== See also ==
- "Shadows of P'Jem", sequel episode later in the same season.
