= Shuttlepod One =

- Star Trek: Enterprise episode
- Episode no.: Season 1 Episode 16
- Directed by: David Livingston
- Written by: Rick Berman; Brannon Braga
- Production code: 116
- Original air date: February 13, 2002

Episode chronology
← Previous "Shadows of P'Jem"	Next → "Fusion"
- Star Trek: Enterprise season 1

"Shuttlepod One" is the sixteenth episode (production #116) of the television series Star Trek: Enterprise. It first aired on February 13, 2002 on UPN. In this science fiction television show, a faster-than-light spacecraft sets out from Earth to Explore the Galaxy. It is set in the 2100s of the Star Trek franchise science fiction universe, following the events a century after Star Trek: First Contact.

During a shuttlepod mission, Commander Tucker and Lieutenant Reed become convinced Enterprise has been destroyed and that their prospects of survival are slim. Much of the episode takes place in a Star Trek shuttlecraft, Shuttlepod One.

== Plot ==
On Pod 1, Commander Tucker and Lieutenant Reed are attempting to locate Enterprise in an asteroid field that Captain Archer had intended to map. Just then, Reed spots an impact crater and debris; with only one piece large enough to be identifiable as part of Enterprise, they conclude that the ship has been destroyed. They are now alone, with only ten days' worth of air. Tucker orders Reed to head to Echo Three, a subspace amplifier, using the stars for reference as navigation is down. He intends to send a message to Starfleet, knowing they will not be alive when it reaches there, so that command will at least know what happened. Reed records messages to his family and friends, but Tucker becomes exasperated by Reed's pessimism.

On Enterprise, it is revealed that the debris that Reed and Tucker saw was from an explosion while a Tesnian ship was trying to dock with Enterprise; it was the Tesnian ship that was destroyed, and only a small part of the debris was from Enterprise. Thirty-four Tesnian survivors are on Enterprise. Ensign Mayweather reports that their ETA at Tesnia is twenty hours, allowing enough time to return to meet the shuttlepod. Archer and Sub-Commander T'Pol use a mini-shuttle to inspect the damage to the ship. Later, T'Pol presents her analysis to Archer – both ships were hit by a "micro-singularity", but he remains skeptical that such things exist.

The shuttlepod's hull is also breached by a micro-singularity. Reed and Tucker quickly seal the holes, but find that one of their oxygen cylinders was damaged, leaving them with less than two days' air. They lower the temperature to conserve power for the air recyclers. Later, the radio picks up a signal – it is Sato transmitting new rendezvous coordinates and gives an ETA of two days. Unfortunately, they only have one day's worth of air left and no way to communicate with the ship. They jettison and detonate its engine, attracting Enterprise's attention. Reed wakes up in Sickbay, relieved to see Tucker's sleeping form there as well.

== Production ==
Dominic Keating said this episode was an unexpected opportunity to stretch his acting muscles, and he really enjoyed the rhythm he was able to establish with Connor Trinneer. The set was surrounded by an igloo constructed from six air-conditioning units and blocks of dry ice, so when the actors looked like they were freezing they really were, and it was so cold that were only able to film for about thirty seconds at a time. Keating also mentioned they were continually banging their heads on the low ceiling of the pod. Despite the physical difficulties, Keating was positive about the experience and he did not want that week to end. In a 2015 interview Keating, said he thought it was one of the "finest hours" of the show.

Trineer said it was as freezing cold as it looked, despite it being hot as hell outside. Trinneer said director David Livingston was very thorough, and focused on "capturing a moment" even if that means shooting a scene repeatedly to get it. The prop bottle of bourbon that Reed and Tucker drink is labelled "Dorton's Best" after the show's art director Louise Dorton.

== Reception ==
The episode first aired February 13, 2002 on UPN. It had Nielsen ratings of 3.4/5 and was watched by 5.3 million viewers. Low ratings were attributed to NBC's Winter Olympic coverage dominating the evening. Among science fiction or fantasy genre shows that week Enterprise was beaten by Smallville.

Aint It Cool News gave the episode 3.5 out of 5, and said this was "one of the good ones" and praised the "attention to texture and detail". Robert Bianco of USA Today called it "one of the season's worst episodes" and said the actors "performances collapse under an overwrought script, and neither man should be asked to do a drunk scene again." Keith DeCandido of Tor.com gave it 8 out of 10, in his 2022 rewatch, and called it "a wonderful two-person play."

"Shuttlepod One" has been listed among the best episodes of Star Trek: Enterprise and of all Star Trek. Britt Ryan of Tor.com noted "Shuttlepod One" was one of the Enterprise episodes that held up as a "good Star Trek episode", despite the overall lukewarm reception of the series during its first run. They note this episode as one that takes on some of the hard science challenges of surviving in space. The A.V. Club gave this an honorable mention in their list of recommended Enterprise television episodes.
The Guardian recommended this episode as one of six Star Trek episodes out of the entire Star Trek franchise up to that point. They noted how the episode uses the threat of air running out in a spacecraft to create a backdrop of tension as the characters try to find a solution and discuss the danger. The Hollywood Reporter interviewed various cast and production crew of the Star Trek franchise to determine the "100 Greatest Episodes" from across the six series, ranking "Shuttlepod One" as the 98th best episode of all time.

== Home media ==
This episode was released as part of Enterprise season one, which was released in high definition on Blu-ray disc on March 26, 2013; the release has 1080p video and a DTS-HD Master Audio sound track.

== See also ==
- The Galileo Seven (First Star Trek episode with a shuttlecraft, broadcast January 5, 1967)
