= Shadows of P'Jem =

- Star Trek: Enterprise episode
- Episode no.: Season 1 Episode 15
- Directed by: Mike Vejar
- Story by: Rick Berman; Brannon Braga
- Teleplay by: Mike Sussman; Phyllis Strong
- Production code: 115
- Original air date: February 6, 2002

Guest appearances
- Jeffrey Combs - Commander Shran; Gregory Itzin - Captain Sopek; Steven Dennis - Tholos; Vaughn Armstrong - Admiral Forrest; Gary Graham - Ambassador Soval; Barbara J. Tarbuck - Chancellor Kalev; Jeff Kober - Traeg

Episode chronology
← Previous "Sleeping Dogs"	Next → "Shuttlepod One"
- Star Trek: Enterprise season 1

"Shadows of P'Jem" is the fifteenth episode (production #115) of television series Star Trek: Enterprise, and was written by Rick Berman and Brannon Braga. Mike Vejar served as director for the episode. The episode aired on UPN on February 6, 2002.

Captain Archer and Sub-Commander T'Pol are kidnapped while en route to a planet in the Coridan system, which results in a confrontation between Vulcan and Andorian forces.

The events of this episode (coupled with that of "The Andorian Incident") proved to be the basis for many future occurrences and plot devices in the following three seasons of Star Trek: Enterprise. These included many reprisal attempts against both Archer and T'Pol by the Vulcan High Command, and the developing trust and respect between Archer and the Andorian Commander Shran. There would also be long-ranging implications for T'Pol and for her family, as revealed in the fourth season episode, "Home".

== Plot ==
A Vulcan delegation, headed by Ambassador Soval, complains to Admiral Forrest about the recent diplomatic incident at P'Jem. Soval blames Captain Archer: in response, joint fleet operations are suspended, and Sub-Commander T'Pol is to be recalled from her post. Enterprise is already on its way to Coridan, a planet which has a mining agreement and the largest starship construction yards in the sector. As Archer and T'Pol head to the capital city, their shuttlepod is captured. Later, they try to escape, but are soon recaptured by Traeg, an anti-government leader, who then sends a ransom request of weapons to Enterprise.

After refusing to co-operate with the Vulcans (sent by Soval to return T'Pol to Vulcan) and their rescue mission, Commander Tucker and Lieutenant Reed mount their own, leaving Sato to somehow distract them. The pair are soon 'captured' by Commander Shran and Tholos of the Andorian Imperial Guard, who want to repay Archer for his interventions at P'Jem. The humans and Andorians covertly break into the rebel compound where Archer and T'Pol are being held, while the Vulcans, led by Captain Sopek, attempt a more direct rescue mission.

The rival groups then confront one another amid the wreckage of the compound. As they argue about treaty violations, T'Pol notices Traeg targeting the group. She pushes Sopek out of the way and takes the phaser blast meant for him. Archer gathers her up and leaves with his away-team. In Sickbay, Doctor Phlox treats her, and Sopek arrives to ask about her condition. Archer asks that T'Pol be given a second chance, and he agrees to lobby the Vulcan High Command on her behalf. As they leave, Phlox revives T'Pol with a hypospray, and Archer says that she will be on Enterprise for a while longer.

== Production ==
The events of "The Andorian Incident" are referenced in this episode, and Jeffrey Combs returns as the Andorian Commander Shran.

The episode included a sight gag in which T'Pol and Archer, tied back-to-back, try awkwardly to get themselves free, their efforts ultimately resulting in Archer momentarily being smothered by T'Pol's breasts. Blalock commented that one time during rehearsals the crew played "Love Shack" by The B-52s and gathered around them singing and clapping, while she and Bakula were stuck unable to move. When asked if he enjoyed the scene Bakula responded: "Oh, sure. If you've got to be tied up with somebody, it might as well be her".

== Reception ==
Shadows of P'Jem was first aired in the United States on UPN on February 6, 2002. According to Nielsen Media Research, it received a 3.8/6 rating share among adults. It had an average of 6.1 million viewers.

Aint It Cool News gave the episode 2.5 out of 5. The review was critical of the episode for repeating what had already been made clear, that T'Pol had become part of the crew. He said the scene where T'Pol and Archer were tied up does "at times skirt the realm of crude and jarringly inappropriate slapstick". Television Without Pity gave the episode a grade C+. Keith DeCandido of Tor.com gave it 7 out of 10 in his 2022 rewatch.

In a 2004 interview with Cinefantastique, Blalock criticized this episode as an example of the inconsistency and discontinuity that undermined the series: "In 'Shadows of P'Jem,' they made this huge story about how Vulcans were undermining Starfleet and had some kind of agenda, but they never went to readdress it."

== Home media ==
This episode was released as part of Enterprise season one, which was released in high definition on Blu-ray disc on March 26, 2013; the release has 1080p video and a DTS-HD Master Audio sound track.
