= Stephanie Niznik =

American actress (1967–2019)

- Niznik in 2006
- Born: May 20, 1967
- Died: June 23, 2019 (aged 52); Encino, Los Angeles, U.S.
- Burial place: Saint Rose of Lima New Catholic Cemetery, Littleton, New Hampshire, US
- Education: Duke University; California Institute of the Arts
- Occupation: Actress
- Years active: 1994–2009
- Known for: Everwood; Vanishing Son; Diagnosis: Murder; Star Trek: Insurrection; Star Trek: Enterprise: "Rogue Planet"; Life Is Wild

Stephanie Lynne Niznik (May 20, 1967 – June 23, 2019) was an American film, television, and theatre actress, most famous for her role as Nina Feeney on Everwood.

== Early life and career ==
Niznik grew up in Brewer, Maine, and was co-valedictorian of the Class of 1986 at John Bapst Memorial High School where she was an exchange student to Paris, participated in genetic research at the Jackson Laboratory, and was a National Merit Scholar. She intended to become a geneticist and gained early acceptance to Harvard University before entering and graduating magna cum laude from Duke University where she was an Angier B. Duke Scholar. At Duke Niznik changed her goals, majoring in theater and Russian. She then graduated from the California Institute of the Arts. Besides Everwood, Niznik's television roles include guest roles on Dr. Quinn, Medicine Woman, Profiler, Sliders, JAG, Frasier, Epoch, Star Trek: Enterprise, Traveler, and Diagnosis: Murder, in addition to being a series regular on the mid-1990s action drama Vanishing Son and the 2007 drama Life Is Wild. She also appeared in the films Star Trek: Insurrection (1998) and Exit to Eden (1994). After retiring from acting in 2009, Niznik focused on volunteerism, including involvement with organizations that helped children, the hungry, and animals.

== Death ==
Niznik died unexpectedly in Encino, Los Angeles on June 23, 2019, at the age of 52. She is buried in the Saint Rose of Lima New Catholic Cemetery in Littleton, New Hampshire.

== Filmography ==
=== Film ===
Year	Title	Role	Notes
1994	Exit to Eden	Diana	
1996	The Twilight of the Golds	Shauna	
1996	Dear God	Emanda Maine	
1998	Memorial Day	Robin Connors	
1998	Star Trek: Insurrection	Kell Perim	
1999	Kismet	Stephanie	Short film
1999	Anywhere but Here	Waitress	
2001	Spiders II: Breeding Ground	Alexandra	
2001	Epoch	Dr. K.C. Czaban	
2001	Beyond the City Limits	Reporter	
2009	The Twenty	Dot	

=== Television ===
Year	Title	Role	Notes
1995	Vanishing Son	Agent Judith Phillips	Main cast
1995	Renegade	Laurie Hayes	Episode: "Most Wanted"
1995	Murder, She Wrote	Dorie Saunders	Episode: "Home Care"
1996	The Sentinel	Maggie Bryce	Episode: "The Rig"
1996	Apollo 11	Reporter #3	TV movie
1997	The Guardian	C.C.	TV movie
1997	Dr. Quinn, Medicine Woman	Rose	Episode: "The Most Fatal Disease"
1997	Sliders	Debra Carbol	Episode: "Sole Survivors"
1997	JAG	Lt. 'Hobo' Green	Episode: "Vanished"
1997, 1999	Viper	Lena Weisinger	2 episodes
1998	Mr. Murder	Dr. Roget	TV movie
1998	L.A. Doctors	Alyssa	Episode: "A Prayer for the Lying"
1998	Emma's Wish	Kelly Short	TV movie
1998	Profiler	Susan Moss	Episode: "Cravings"
1998	Inferno	Erika	TV movie
1998	Diagnosis: Murder	Caitlin Sweeney	4 episodes
1999	Nash Bridges	Riley Parker	Episode: "Frisco Blues"
1999	Family Law	Tina Holmes	Episode: "Damages"
2000	Diagnosis: Murder	Laura Caine	Episode: "Blind Man's Bluff"
2001	Epoch	Dr. KC Czaban	TV movie
2002	Star Trek: Enterprise	The Wraith	Episode: "Rogue Planet"
2002–06	Everwood	Nina Feeney	Recurring role (season 1), main cast (seasons 2–4)
2007	Grey's Anatomy	Carol	Episode: "The Other Side of This Life: Parts 1 & 2"
2007	Traveler	Kate	Episode: "The Tells"
2007–08	Life Is Wild	Jo Weller-Clarke	Main cast
2008	CSI: Miami	Deborah Radley	Episode: "To Kill a Predator"
2008	Eli Stone	Delia Slater	Episode: "Two Ministers"
2009	NCIS	Inmate Sharon Bellows	Episode: "Caged"
2009	Lost	Dr. Evelyn Ariza	Episode: "The Little Prince"
