= Unexpected (Star Trek: Enterprise) =

- Star Trek: Enterprise episode
- Episode no.: Season 1 Episode 5
- Directed by: Mike Vejar
- Written by: Rick Berman; Brannon Braga
- Production code: 105
- Original air date: October 17, 2001

Guest appearances
- Julianne Christie – Ah'Len; Randy Oglesby – Trena'L; Christopher Darga – Captain Vorok; Regi Davis – Klingon First Officer; T.L. Kolman – Alien Man; John Cragen – Crewman; Drew Howerton – Steward; Mike Baldridge — Dillard

Episode chronology
← Previous "Strange New World"	Next → "Terra Nova"
- Star Trek: Enterprise season 1

"Unexpected" is the fifth episode (production #105) of the television series Star Trek: Enterprise, and was written by Brannon Braga and Rick Berman. Mike Vejar was the director. The episode aired on UPN on October 17, 2001.

A ship feeding off Enterprise's warp field is exposed after the crew ignites the plasma exhaust. Commander Tucker visits to help them repair their ship. After his return to Enterprise, he learns that he is pregnant.

== Plot ==
In Engineering, Commander Tucker is trying to solve ship-wide problems with power supply and life support. Sub-Commander T'Pol discovers a distortion in the wake of the Enterprise. Captain Archer ignites the plasma, revealing a cloaked ship. He hails the vessel and a Xyrillian, Captain Trena'l explains that they have been tapping the Enterprise's exhaust to recharge their engines. Archer offers assistance. Tucker is to visit for three days, and he is given injections by Doctor Phlox so his body can adapt to the alien environment.

Once aboard, Tucker meets Ah'len, the Xyrillian engineer. They become ever more friendly while repairing the ship. Ah'len takes him to a holodeck to show him Thera, a city on the Xyrillian homeworld. During the tour, Ah'len engages in a seemingly innocent game that allows them to share their thoughts and desires. When the repairs are completed and Tucker returns, he notices a strange growth on his wrist. He visits Phlox, who tells him that he is pregnant (though Phlox also states no genetic material is taken from the male involved). Tucker mentions the telepathic game and Phlox says that it might be the transfer medium for the alien fetus. Later, as the embryo grows, Archer asks T'Pol to locate the Xyrillian ship.

They discover it hiding in a Klingon warship's plasma wake. Archer hails Captain Vorok, and helps them to detect the Xyrillian ship. Vorok is angry, and wants to destroy the ship, but T'Pol reminds him that Archer was the one who found Klaang and saved Qo'noS from civil war, and that the Chancellor himself called him "brother" in the Klingon High Council. Tucker goes to the Xyrillian ship, and Ah'len notes the embryo is young enough to be safely transplanted. She apologises to him, informing him she was not aware pregnancy was even possible with another species. Vorok ends the encounter after securing the Xyrillian's holodeck technology, but warns Archer against a future meeting. T'Pol later informs Tucker that his was "the first recorded instance of a human male pregnancy".

== Production ==
Staff member André Bormanis later explained that the inclusion of a Klingon battlecruiser design similar to what had been used previously in the franchise (in time periods set later in the timeline) was to indicate the slow evolution of Klingon ship design. He compared this to the speed of changes seen in the rockets used by the Russian Space Agency, and said that the philosophy for the Klingons was that "if the design works, why change it?" Connor Trinneer loved the episode concept: "How often do you get the opportunity as an actor to tackle things like this?"

Michael Westmore created the nipple effect using common gelatin, as it offered greater luminosity than latex or rubber, and better resembled human skin.

== Reception ==
"Unexpected" was first aired in the United States on UPN on October 17, 2001. According to Nielsen Media Research, it received a 5.2/8 rating share among adults. It had an average of 8.2 million viewers.

Sunny Lee of Entertainment Weekly said the comedic episode "mixed irreverent wit [...] with a bit of inter-galactic pondering about biological reproduction" but that it was resolved before things got too sentimental or serious. Daryl H Miller of the Los Angeles Times called "Unexpected" "one of the cleverest episodes on any channel". About.com's Julia Houston gave the episode a positive review, and wrote: "Funny without being sentimental, a good adventure with enough outrageousness to compensate for the lack of any real danger. It's too fluffy to watch every week, but a few times a season will keep us smiling." Jason Bates of IGN rated it four out of five. He liked the humor, saying it had "some genuinely funny moments". He also appreciated that "the aliens were alien for a change". Bates would have liked the supporting characters to have had something to do in a subplot and was disappointed by Blalock's muted performance, but found the episode "a fun ride overall." Keith DeCandido of Tor.com gave it three out of ten.

In 2017, Screen Rant ranked the Xyrillians, the aliens featured in this episode, as the 14th most bizarre aliens in Star Trek. This episode was noted for alien Xyrillian impregnating Trip, and for showing a nipple on screen, but not in the way the audience might expect.

In 2011, Star Trek Magazine rated this episode one out of five, and named it the worst of the season, dismissing it as "too silly". Empire picked "Unexpected" as the worst episode of the series. Star Trek: The Complete Manual published by SciFiNow listed it as the worst episode of the series. WhatCulture ranked this episode the tenth worst episode of the Star Trek franchise. Digital Fox ranked this episode as the third worst episode of all Star Trek up to 2018. SyFy included this episode in a group of Star Trek franchise episodes they felt were commonly disliked but "deserved a second chance". Michael Weyer, writing for CBR included this episode on a list of episodes of Star Trek they stated were "So Bad They Must Be Seen", and said the "man getting pregnant" story trope rarely works well in any medium.

== Home media ==
This episode was released as part of Enterprise season one, which was released in high definition on Blu-ray disc on March 26, 2013; it has 1080p video and a DTS-HD Master Audio sound track.
