= False Profits =

- Star Trek: Voyager episode
- Episode no.: Season 3 Episode 5
- Directed by: Cliff Bole
- Story by: George A. Brozak
- Teleplay by: Joe Menosky
- Production code: 40840-144
- Original air date: October 2, 1996

Guest appearances
- Dan Shor - Arridor; Leslie Jordan - Kol; Michael Ensign - Bard; Rob LaBelle - Kafar

Episode chronology
← Previous "The Swarm"	Next → "Remember"
- Star Trek: Voyager season 3

"False Profits" is the 47th episode of Star Trek: Voyager, the fifth episode of the third season. This is a science fiction television episode of the Star Trek franchise, that aired on UPN on October 2, 1996. The episode functions as a sequel to the Star Trek: The Next Generation episode "The Price" (1989). Voyager is making its way back home, after being flung to the other side of the galaxy. The crew is surprised to find some Ferengi there.

The show is one of four episodes that was shot for Season 2 and aired in Season 3.

== Plot ==
USS Voyager detects an unstable wormhole whose exit point is traced to the Alpha Quadrant. This would be a shortcut home for Voyager; the only problem is that the Delta Quadrant side moves around erratically. While Harry Kim and B'Elanna Torres work on a way to stabilize the wormhole, Tuvok investigates a nearby planet called Takar with a Bronze Age civilization. He is surprised to discover evidence of replicator technology there.

Chakotay and Paris beam down to investigate. They discover two Ferengi posing as sages who were foretold in the planet's mythology. Years ago, as told in the Star Trek: The Next Generation episode "The Price", they had come through the wormhole, and since it was unstable, had been unable to go back. Instead they had decided to exploit the replicator technology to make themselves rich. When the Ferengi are beamed aboard Voyager, they refuse to go back through the wormhole and point out the harm to the natives' religion if they simply disappeared. Janeway is forced to return them to the planet.

Neelix, disguised as a Ferengi, travels back to the planet. He pretends to be a representative (the "Grand Proxy") of the Ferengi ruler, the Grand Nagus, and demands the two return to the Alpha Quadrant so he may confiscate their riches. His ruse is uncovered and the Ferengi attempt to kill him. Neelix barely survives the assault and is left among the natives. However, the Voyager crew has learned the end of the native mythology – Neelix announces himself as the "Holy Pilgrim", a character prophesied to return the sages to their home. He coordinates with Voyager to create signs of his authenticity, which incites the natives to attempt to burn him and the Ferengi at the stake, citing a passage prophesying that they will return home on "wings of fire". Neelix and the Ferengi are beamed away at the last moment and the natives are convinced their prophecy has come true.

The Voyager crew succeed in stabilizing the wormhole, but the Ferengi manage to steal back their shuttlecraft, which Voyager had confiscated. Their attempts to escape back to Takar end with them being sucked into the wormhole and destabilizing it on both ends, leaving the Ferengi lost in space again. Voyager is left behind and they resume course to the Alpha Quadrant at warp 6.

== Reception ==
In 2017, Den of Geek included this on their abbreviated watch guide for Star Trek: Voyager, picking out this episode on their cross-overs roadmap.

In 2017, Treknews.net felt this was one of the funniest episodes of all Star Trek, and likened the plot to that of another science fiction franchise, Stargate.

== Releases ==
"False Profits" was released on LaserDisc in Japan on June 25, 1999, as part of the 3rd Season Vol. 1 set.

"False Profits" was released on DVD on July 6, 2004 as part of Star Trek Voyager: Complete Third Season, with Dolby 5.1 surround audio. The season 3 DVD was released in the UK on September 6, 2004.

In 2017, the complete Star Trek: Voyager television series was released in a DVD box set, which included "False Profits" as part of the season 3 discs.

== See also ==
- Inside Man (Star Trek: Voyager) (also features the Ferengi)
- The Last Outpost (Star Trek: The Next Generation) (the first Star Trek episode featuring the Ferengi)
- Ménage à Troi (the Star Trek: The Next Generation episode where Ethan Phillips played a Ferengi)
