= David Keith (actor) =

American actor and director (born 1954)

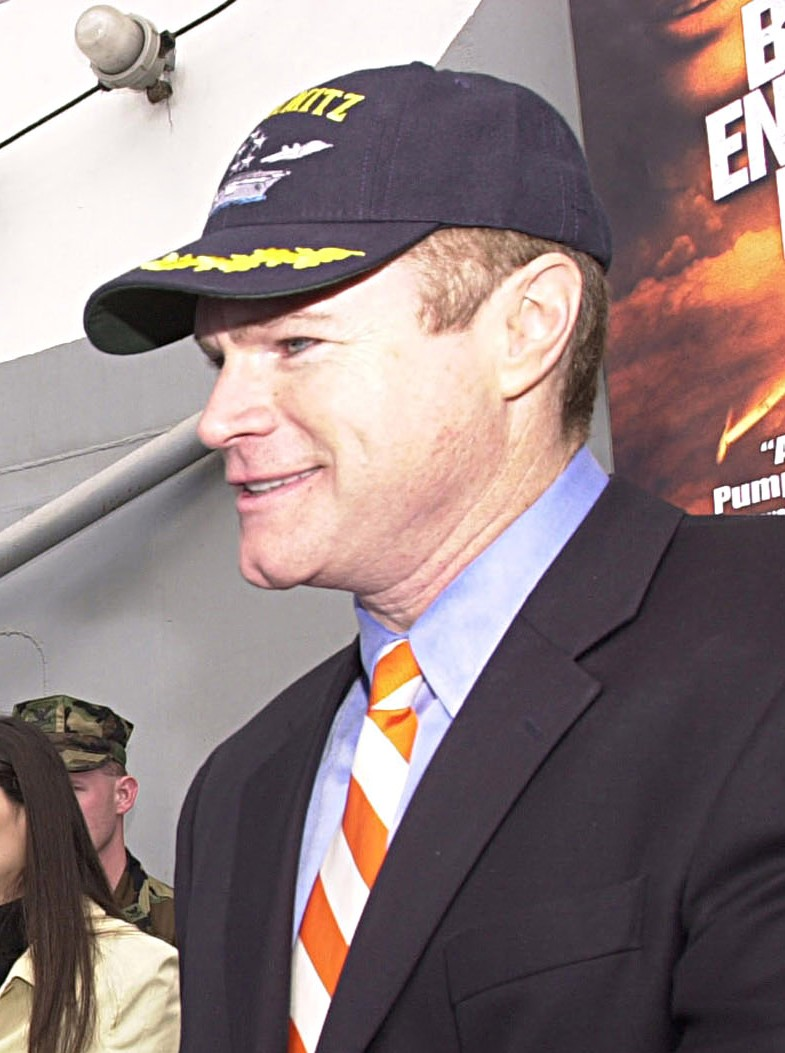
- Keith in 2002
- Born: David Lemuel Keith; May 8, 1954 (age 72); Knoxville, Tennessee, U.S.
- Occupations: Actor; director
- Years active: 1978–present
- Spouse: Nancy Clark (m. 2000; div. 2016)
- Children: 2

David Lemuel Keith (born May 8, 1954) is an American actor and film director. His breakout role was as aspiring Navy pilot Sid Worley in An Officer and a Gentleman (1982), earning Golden Globe nominations for New Star of the Year – Actor and Best Supporting Actor – Motion Picture. The role paved the way for leading performances in The Lords of Discipline (1983), Firestarter (1984) and the cult thriller White of the Eye (1987).

Keith has since appeared in numerous supporting roles, among them Major League II (1994), The Indian in the Cupboard (1995), Poodle Springs (1998), U-571 (2000), Men of Honor (2000), Behind Enemy Lines (2001) and Daredevil (2003). He also portrayed Elvis Presley in Chris Columbus’s musical comedy Heartbreak Hotel (1988), singing several numbers on the soundtrack.

== Early life ==
David Lemuel Keith was born on May 8, 1954, in Knoxville, Tennessee, to Hilda Earle, a worker for the Knox County Board of Education, and Lemuel Grady Keith, Jr., a personnel division worker for the Tennessee Valley Authority. His cousin is Mike Keith, former play-by-play announcer for the Tennessee Titans NFL football team, and the current play-by-play announcer for the University of Tennessee Tennessee Volunteers football and basketball teams. He graduated from the University of Tennessee with a Bachelor of Arts in Speech and Theater.

== Career ==
Keith had an early supporting role in the prison film Brubaker. He had supporting roles in The Rose starring Bette Midler, and An Officer and a Gentleman starring Richard Gere. Keith played a local thug in The Great Santini, starred in The Lords of Discipline and White of the Eye, and held a prominent supporting role in U-571 opposite Matthew McConaughey. Keith played opposite child-star Drew Barrymore in the 1984 thriller Firestarter and Brooke Shields in 1992's Running Wild. He is also well known for his role as Jack Parkman in Major League II starring Charlie Sheen and Tom Berenger.

Keith played Elvis Presley in the 1988 film Heartbreak Hotel. He directed The Curse and The Further Adventures of Tennessee Buck (in which he also starred). Keith appeared in Ernest Goes to School as Squint Westwood (a spoof of Clint Eastwood) and in The Indian in the Cupboard as the cowboy "Boo-Hoo" Boone. He played the leading role of Nate Springfield in the 2003 film Hangman's Curse. Keith also co-starred in The Class, an American sitcom, as Yonk Allen, a retired professional football player. Other roles include parts in Daredevil and the 2002 television film Carrie. He appeared in the 2004 film Raise Your Voice starring Hilary Duff, and the 2006 film Expiration Date.

Keith has appeared on many television series, including NCIS, Law & Order: Special Victims Unit, Law & Order: Criminal Intent, CSI: Miami, High Incident and Hawaii Five-0. In 2010, he co-starred as John Allen, father of Robert Allen (James Wolk) in the short-lived television drama Lone Star.

== Personal life ==
Keith married Nancy Clark, a realtor, in 2000; they divorced in 2016. They have two children, Presley and Coulter. He is an avid University of Tennessee Volunteers fan and is present on the sidelines for Volunteer football games when his schedule allows.

Keith was a National Advisory Board member and spokesperson for PROTECT: The National Association to Protect Children. He was present during the sentencing phase for John Couey, who was convicted of kidnapping, raping, and murdering Jessica Lunsford. Keith said that he was planning on going to Washington, D.C., with Mark Lunsford after the sentencing, to lobby Congress for more support of sex offender laws.

Notwithstanding the above, Keith was accused by actor Wil Wheaton of mistreating child actors on the set of the 1987 movie The Curse, in a 2022 blog post.

== Filmography ==
=== Film ===
Year	Title	Role	Notes
1979	The Great Santini	Red Pettus	
1979	The Rose	PFC. Mal	
1980	Brubaker	Larry Lee Bullen	
1981	Back Roads	Mason	
1981	Take This Job and Shove It	Harry Meade	
1982	An Officer and a Gentleman	AOC Sid Worley	
1983	The Lords of Discipline	Will McLean	
1983	Independence Day	Jack Parker	
1984	Firestarter	Andrew McGee	
1985	Gulag	Mickey Almon	
1987	The Curse	—N/a	Director only
1987	White of the Eye	Paul White	
1988	The Further Adventures of Tennessee Buck	Buck Malone	Also director
1988	Heartbreak Hotel	Elvis Presley	
1990	The Two Jakes	Lt. Loach	
1991	Caged Fear	Tommy Lane	
1991	Off and Running	Jack Cornett	
1992	Liar's Edge	Gary Kirkpatrick	
1993	Desperate Motive	Harry Young	
1994	Major League II	Jack Parkman	
1994	Ernest Goes to School	Squint Westwood	
1994	Raw Justice	Mace	
1994	Temptation	Bone Babancourt	
1995	Running Wild	Jack Hutton	
1995	Till the End of the Night	Garrett Hill	
1995	The Indian in the Cupboard	Boone	
1995	Deadly Sins	Jack Gales	
1995	Gold Diggers: The Secret of Bear Mountain	Ray Karnisak	
1996	A Family Thing	Sonny Pilcher	
1996	Invasion of Privacy	Sgt. Rutherford	
1996	Judge and Jury	Joe Meeker	
1997	Red-Blooded American Girl II	Mr. Colbert	
1998	Ambushed	Deputy Lawrence	
1999	Question of Privilege	Carter Roberts	
1999	Secret of the Andes	Brooks Willings	
1999	If... Dog... Rabbit...	Parole Officer Gilmore	
2000	U-571	Maj. Matthew Coonan	
2000	Men of Honor	Cpt. Hartigan	
2001	Epoch	Mason Rand	
2001	Cahoots	Harley	
2001	Burning Down the House	Carolina	
2001	World Traveler	Richard	
2001	Behind Enemy Lines	Master Chief Tom O'Malley	
2002	The Stickup	Ray DeCarlo	
2002	Clover Blend	McGary	
2002	Mother Ghost	Carey	
2003	Daredevil	Jack 'The Devil' Murdock	
2003	Hangman's Curse	Nate Springfield	
2003	Waterville	Blake Robison	Also director
2004	The Kings of Brooklyn	Scoggins	
2004	Raise Your Voice	Simon Fletcher	
2005	All Souls Day	Sheriff Blanco	
2005	Come Away Home	Sheriff Jantz	
2006	Miracle Dogs Too	Mr. Mulvaney	
2006	In Her Line of Fire	Vice President Walker	
2006	Expiration Date	Wild William	
2006	Bottoms Up	Uncle Earl Peadman	
2007	Succubus: Hell-Bent	Wallace	
2008	Clown Hunt	B.J.	
2008	Boys of Summerville	Joe	
2010	Beneath the Blue	'Hawk'	
2010	Unrequited	Nate Grissom	
2014	Christian Mingle	Bill Wood	
2015	Awaken	Dr. Walsh	
2016	Heritage Falls	Coach Charlie Fitzpatrick	
2017	All Saints	Boyd	
2019	Finding Grace	Bishop Reed	
2023	I'll Be Watching	Sheriff Anderson	Also executive producer
2023	Walden	Judge Boyle	
2024	Dead Money	Jack	

=== Television ===
Year	Title	Role	Notes
1978	Are You in the House Alone?	Student	Uncredited
1978	Happy Days	Fred Collins	Episode: "Richie Gets Framed"
1979	Friendly Fire	Leroy Hamilton	Television film
1979	Co-ed Fever	Tucker Davis	Miniseries
1980	The Golden Moment: An Olympic Love Story	Wayne Robinson	Television film
1985	Gulag	Mickey Almon	Television film
1986	If Tomorrow Comes	Daniel Cooper	Miniseries
1989	Guts and Glory: The Rise and Fall of Oliver North	Oliver North	Television film
1991	Flesh 'n' Blood	Arlo Weed	12 episodes
1993	Whose child is this? The war for baby Jessica	Dan Schmidt	Television film
1994	XXX's & OOO's	Bullet Dobbs	Television film
1994	Texas	Jim Bowie	Television film
1994	If Looks Could Kill	Detective Peter Stanford	Television film
1996	Strangers	Richard	Episode: "Crash"
1996–97	High Incident	Jim Marsh	32 episodes
1998	The Outer Limits	Major Jason Mercer	Episode: "Lithia"
1998	Perfect Prey	Dwayne Alan Clay	Television film
1998	Poodle Springs	Larry Victor / Charles Nichols	Television film
1999	A Memory in My Heart	Matt	Television film
2000	Walker, Texas Ranger	Cliff Eagleton	Episode: "The Day of Cleansing"
2000	Martial Law	Cliff Eagleton	Episode: "Honor Among Strangers"
2000	Arli$$	Archie Michaels	Episode: "You Can Pick Your Friends..."
2001	Love and Treason	Eli Dixon	Television film
2001	Constant Payne	Alexander 'Doc' Payne (voice)	Television short
2001	Epoch	Mason Rand	Television film
2001	Law & Order: Special Victims Unit	Detective John 'Hawk' Hawkins	Episode: "Redemption"
2002	Sabretooth	Robert Thatcher	Television film
2002	Carrie	Detective John Mulcahey	Television film
2003	Deep Shock	Captain Andrew 'Andy' Raines, USN	Television film
2003	Epoch: Evolution	Mason Rand	Television film
2003–04	Still Life	Ben Morgan	Unaired; 5 episodes
2004	NCIS	Captain Mike Watson	Episode: "See No Evil"
2005	Path of Destruction	Roy Stark	Television film
2005	Law & Order: Criminal Intent	Detective Mark Virgini	Episode: "Unchained"
2005	Locusts: The 8th Plague	Gary Wolf	Television film
2006–07	The Class	'Yonk' Allen	11 episodes
2008	CSI: Miami	Evan Caldwell	2 episodes
2010	Lone Star	John Allen	5 episodes
2010	Chase	Alan Matthews	Episode: "Crazy Love"
2011	Nikita	Richard Ellison	Episode: "343 Walnut Lane"
2011–19	Hawaii Five-0	Commander Wade Gutches	4 episodes
2014	Outlaw Prophet: Warren Jeffs	Gary Engels	Television film
2014	Reckless	Pat McCandless	4 episodes
2014	Killer Kids	Himself	Episode: "Raging Hormones"
2019	Wedding at Graceland	Laurel's Father	Television film
2021	Paper Empire	Al Scoggins	2 episodes
2026	9-1-1: Nashville	Chief Connor	Episode: "Tears of the Nile"

=== Video games ===
Year	Title	Role	Notes
1996	OverBlood	Raz Karcy	Voice only
