= Epoch (film) =

2001 film by Matt Codd

- Epoch DVD cover
- Written by: Jonathan Raymond; Phillip Roth
- Directed by: Matt Codd
- Starring: David Keith; Ryan O'Neal; Stephanie Niznik; Brian Thompson
- Theme music composer: Richard McHugh
- Country of origin: United States
- Original language: English

Production
- Producers: Jeff Beach; Ken Olandt; Phillip Roth
- Cinematography: Ken Stipe
- Editors: Randy Carter; Ken Peters
- Running time: 93 minutes

Original release
- Release: November 24, 2001

Related
- Epoch: Evolution

Epoch is a 2001 American science fiction film directed by Matt Codd, starring David Keith, Stephanie Niznik, Brian Thompson, and Shannon Lee. The film concerns the discovery of a strange and mysterious monolith, and the tribulations faced by the team sent to study it.

== Plot ==
Four billion years ago, before life had developed on Earth, a cosmic object fell in the seas of our planet. In modern times in the mountains of Bhutan, a huge artifact makes its way to the surface, producing a powerful electromagnetic pulse causing worldwide blackouts.

Alarmed by the electromagnetic phenomenon and under request of the government of Bhutan, the American NSA launches a military and scientific reconnaissance operation on site, led by Dr. K.C. Czaban (Stephanie Niznik) with the technical assistance of terminally ill engineer Mason Rand (David Keith), picked up on the Mexican border in time for the mission. The team finds the artifact suspended in the air and object of veneration from the natives, who call it the Torus and consider it a gift from the gods with extraordinary healing properties.

The US team enters the Torus, but an air strike by the Chinese Army against the artifact prompts an unexpected response from the object, which destroys two Chinese military planes and kidnaps a US soldier. Unsuccessful diplomatic negotiations escalate the tension in the area between Chinese and US armed forces, while inside the Torus the scientific team goes to the core of the huge machine. They discover how ancient the artifact is and speculate it could have been the spark of life on Earth, as well as the cause of multiple extinctions in the course of the eras. Fomented by NSA agent Allen Lysander (Ryan O'Neal), conflict explodes between the troops of the two factions and the Torus reacts, blanketing the planet with a thick cloud cover, evidently starting the process for a new mass extinction.

By Presidential order, the US soldiers plant a nuclear bomb inside the Torus to destroy it, and Czaban and Rand unsuccessfully try to deactivate the device to keep it from detonating. However, the Torus absorbs the blast and, seemingly satisfied by the extreme sacrifice attempted by the two scientists, ceases its actions, sheds its external shell and, in the form of an energy sphere, leaves Earth. Four months later, Rand, now cured of ALS after his exposure to Torus, receives from Czaban the news that she is pregnant, despite being sterile before their encounter with the alien artifact.

== Cast ==
- David Keith - Dr. Mason Rand
- Stephanie Niznik - Dr. K.C. Czaban
- Ryan O'Neal - Allen Lysander
- Brian Thompson - Capt. Tower
- Steve Bond - Colonel Tell
- Craig Wasson - Hudson
- Michael Cavanaugh - Williams
- Shannon Lee - Pamela
- James Avery - Dr. Solomon Holt
- James Hong - Ambassador Po
- Joseph Patrick Kelly - Control Tech (as Joe Kelly)
- Donald Li - Chinese Scientist
- William Zabka - Rover Driver Joe
- Marc McClure - German Scientist
- Eloy Casados - Mexican Doctor

== Marketing ==
On November 24, 2001, the Sci Fi Channel's debut airing of Epoch garnered a 2.3 rating, or 1.7 million household, becoming the network's highest-rated original movie, surpassing the miniseries Frank Herbert's Dune (2000). The film, which the network purchased from the United Film Organization, had solely been marketed with on-air promos.

== Sequel ==
Epoch: Evolution is the 2003 sequel to Epoch, directed by Ian Watson and written by Sam Wells with David Keith and Brian Thompson reprising their roles from the original film.
