= Sleeping Dogs (Star Trek: Enterprise) =

- Star Trek: Enterprise episode
- Episode no.: Season 1 Episode 14
- Directed by: Les Landau
- Written by: Fred Dekker
- Production code: 114
- Original air date: January 30, 2002

Guest appearances
- Michelle C. Bonilla - Bu'kaH; Vaughn Armstrong - Klingon Captain

Episode chronology
← Previous "Dear Doctor"	Next → "Shadows of P'Jem"
- Star Trek: Enterprise season 1

"Sleeping Dogs" is the fourteenth episode (production #114) of the science fiction television series Star Trek: Enterprise. This episode first aired January 30, 2002 on UPN. It was written by Fred Dekker and directed by Les Landau.

Sub-Commander T'Pol, Lieutenant Reed and Ensign Sato are stranded on a Klingon vessel sinking into a gas giant. Captain Archer tries to convince a captured Klingon to help before the away team is crushed by the intense pressure of the planet's atmosphere.

== Plot ==
After Enterprise drops out of warp near a gas giant, the crew detects an unexpected power signature and bio-signs in its lower atmosphere. Sub-Commander T'Pol, Lieutenant Reed and Ensign Sato take a shuttle to investigate and discover a Klingon vessel, Somraw, close to being crushed by the planet's atmosphere. On board, T'Pol finds three dying Klingons on the bridge, and further scans detect residual elements of a carbon dioxide-based neurotoxin. Bu'kaH, a surviving Klingon crewmember, escapes in the away team's shuttlepod. Enterprise traps it, but not before she broadcasts a distress signal. They then attempt to descend to rescue the away-team, but the pressure is too high.

Meanwhile, Sato finds the captain's log, which states that the ship was damaged in a skirmish with the Xarantine, and that the Klingon captain ordered his ship into the gas giant's atmosphere to effect repairs. Sato also locates the port fusion-injector on a schematic, and the away team make their way to Engineering to attempt repairs. On board Enterprise, Captain Archer talks to Bu'kaH in Sickbay. Doctor Phlox learns that the toxin was bonded to a molecule in Xarantine ale, which Bu'kaH confirms was part of their spoils. He convinces her to help them, citing the dishonourable deaths of her crew-mates.

On the Somraw, Reed uses shock-waves from photon torpedoes in an attempt to raise the ship and lower the hull-pressure. This allows Archer and Bu'kaH, in a reinforced shuttlepod, to reach them. Archer tells Bu'kaH that his team risked their lives for her ship, and that they are not leaving until it is safe. Archer arrives back on Enterprise just as the recovered Somraw hails. The now-revived captain orders Archer to surrender as punishment for violating his ship. Archer faces him down, noting that his ship is damaged and freshly out of torpedoes. Powerless to argue, the Klingon snarls and ends the transmission.

== Production ==
The episode title comes from the phrase "Let sleeping dogs lie" from Shakespeare's Henry IV, Part 2.

Les Landau had previously directed many episodes of Star Trek, this was the one and only episode of Enterprise he directed. The episode was written by consulting producer Fred Dekker, it was his favorite of the three episodes where he was the credited writer. He was inspired by the Kursk submarine disaster, and thought the combination of claustrophobia, politics, and human drama made a good premise for a story. Hoshi was Dekker's favorite character as he felt she was the most human and relatable, and he tried to tried to write for her as much as possible. Originally the Orions had been the target of the Klingons but it was later changed to a species called the Xarantine. Brannon Braga thought that they did one Klingon episode too many in season one.

Stephen Lee was due to play the role of the Klingon Captain, but was unable to do so and Vaughn Armstrong who plays Admiral Forrest, stepped in. Armstrong ultimately appeared in twenty-seven Star Trek episodes in twelve different roles.

== Reception ==
Sleeping Dogs was first aired in the United States on UPN on January 30, 2002. According to Nielsen Media Research, it received a 3.9/6 rating share among adults. This means it had an average of 6.5 million viewers. Among science fiction or fantasy genre shows, Enterprise came in third place that week behind The X-Files and Smallville.

Aint It Cool News gave the episode 3 out of 5, he found parts "a little too familiar" but gave positive notices about the performances of Park and Blalock. Michelle Erica Green of TrekNation gave it a positive review, and called it "an entertaining and lively episode with strong character work and the old, unreformed Klingon attitude we all love." Jamahl Epsicokhan of Jammer's Reviews said there were "Some admittedly good character moments, but the story is too bland", instead he recommended the Deep Space Nine episode "Starship Down" as a better executed more tense submarine story. He rated the episode 2 out of 4. Keith DeCandido of Tor.com gave it 5 out of 10 in his 2022 rewatch. He criticized the episode for being too passive, saying "There's absolutely no sense of tension or danger" (unlike "Starship Down"), but does call it "a good character piece, especially for Sato".

== Home media ==
This episode was released as part of Enterprise season one, which was released in high definition on Blu-ray disc on March 26, 2013; the release has 1080p video and a DTS-HD Master Audio sound track.
