= The Chute =

- Star Trek: Voyager episode
- Episode no.: Season 3 Episode 3
- Directed by: Les Landau
- Story by: Clayvon C. Harris
- Teleplay by: Kenneth Biller
- Production code: 147
- Original air date: September 18, 1996

Guest appearances
- Don McManus - Zio; Robert Pine - Ambassador Liria; James Parks - Vel; Ed Trotta - Pit; Beans Morocco - Rib; Rosemary Morgan - Piri

Episode chronology
← Previous "Flashback"	Next → "The Swarm"
- Star Trek: Voyager season 3

"The Chute" is the 45th episode of Star Trek: Voyager, the third episode of the third season. In this science fiction story, two members of the crew of the USS Voyager are trapped in an alien prison. The episode was directed by Les Landau with a story by Clayvon C. Harris. It aired on UPN on September 18, 1996.

== Plot ==
On the Akritirian homeworld Tom Paris and Harry Kim are falsely accused of a terrorist bombing using Trilithium. They are sent to a brutal prison where inmates must fend for themselves to survive, insufficient food is delivered daily through a chute, and each prisoner is implanted with a microchip called "the clamp" that induces aggression and gradually drives them insane. When Captain Janeway tries to intercede, she is told by Ambassador Liri of Akritiri that Kim and Paris confessed to the crime.

Whilst trying to defend Kim, Paris is stabbed in the stomach. Kim manages to work with one of the aliens in order to get bandages for Paris. He also tries to unite the prisoners, to no avail. Kim and the alien work together to disable the force field blocking the chute, climb it, and find that the prison is actually a giant space station. Paris completely loses touch with reality and wrecks the device that disabled the force field. Harry, afflicted as well, attacks Paris in return but manages to hold on to his sanity.

Meanwhile, the Voyager crew manages to capture the real bombers, Piri and Vel. When Janeway returns to the Akritiri and offers to exchange them for her crewmen, the Akritiri ambassador refuses, stressing that their convictions cannot be overturned. Janeway then approaches the bombers, who inform the Voyager staff that they know the location of the prison where Kim and Paris are kept. Janeway decides to free them in exchange for information on the prison's location and on how to penetrate it.

Using Neelix's ship as a disguise, the crew manage to hook into the chute—which is the only means to enter the prison. A small away team consisting of Janeway, Tuvok and a few security guards infiltrate the prison, shoot some of the prisoners and rescue Kim and Paris. They then quickly exit the scene just as an Akritiri patrol vessel states its intention to board Neelix's ship.

Back aboard Voyager, Kim is horrified at what he had almost done while afflicted. Paris convinces him to use a week's worth of replicator rations to recreate some of the meals they had discussed while in prison.

== Production ==
Robert Pine, who played Ambassador Liria is the father of actor Chris Pine who played Captain Kirk in the JJ Abrams Star Trek film series.

Rosemary Morgan, who played Piri, had Star Trek in her family; her mother Julie Cobb appeared as a yeoman in the original series episode "By Any Other Name", and her stepfather was James Cromwell who had several roles in the franchise.

Actor Garrett Wang (cast as Harry Kim) remembers Les Landau directing them in this episode, and while he was trying to focus on acting, the other actors in the series were around Landau making a ruckus. The reason was that they had just started having actors direct in the series, and his co-star McNeil had just directed the previous episode; that was his first time directing and the other actors were excited about getting into directing.

== Reception ==
Juliette Harrisson of Den of Geek cited "The Chute" as one of season three's best episodes due to its plot and cinematography and McNeil and Wang's performances. Harrisson wrote that the episode was ideal for slash fiction fans. Den of Geek also gave an honorable mention in their ranking of the top ten episodes of Star Trek: Voyager. Screen Rant's Alexandra August described the dynamic between Paris and Kim as the closest Star Trek: Voyager ever got to a gay romance. August praised the episode's focus on Paris and Kim, and referenced it as one of the "darkest and most effective" ones from the series. Tor.com noted this as a classic "science fiction prison" episode, and were impressed with grittiness of the set and camera-work by the director, Les Landau.

== Releases ==
"The Chute" was released on LaserDisc in Japan on June 25, 1999, as part of the 3rd season vol.1 set.

"The Chute" was released on DVD on July 6, 2004 as part of Star Trek Voyager: Complete Third Season, with a Dolby 5.1 surround audio.
