= 2025 Women's Lacrosse League season =

First season of the Women's Lacrosse League

- League: Women's Lacrosse League
- Sport: Field Lacrosse
- Duration: February 11 – February 17
- Teams: 4

Regular season
- Season MVP: Izzy Scane (New York Charging)
- Top scorer: Emily Hawryschuk (New York Charging)

Playoffs
- Finals champions: Boston Guard
- Runners-up: New York Charging

WLL seasons
- None 2026 →

The 2025 season of the Women's Lacrosse League (WLL) was the league's inaugural year of play. Four teams competed in the WLL's 2025 tournaments: the Boston Guard, California Palms, Maryland Charm, and New York Charging. The season began with the 2025 WLL Championship Series in February, which was won by the Guard.

== Teams ==
=== Boston Guard ===
- Head coach – Laurie DeLuca
- Assistant coach – Tracey Sullivan

2025 Boston Guard
#	Name	Nationality	Position	Shot	Height	College	Grad year	High school	Hometown	Ref.
0	Kady Glynn	(United States)	Goalie	Right	5 ft 4 in	Loyola	2020	Summith	Florham Park, New Jersey	
1	Rachel Hall	(United States)	Goalie	Right	5 ft 5 in	Boston College	2013	Cypress Woods	Cypress, Texas	
3	Kasey Choma	(United States)	Midfield	Right	5 ft 5 in	Notre Dame	2024	Eastport-South Manor	Manorville, New York	
8	Charlotte North (C)	(United States)	Attack	Right	5 ft 7 in	Boston College	2022	Episcopal School of Dallas	Dallas, Texas	
10	Madison Ahern	(United States)	Midfield	Right	5 ft 8 in	Notre Dame	2024	Notre Dame Academy	Cohasset, Massachusetts	
12	Cassidy Weeks	(United States)	Midfield	Right	5 ft 5 in	Boston College	2024	Bayport-Blue Point	Bayport, New York	
18	Dempsey Arsenault	(United States)	Midfield	Right	5 ft 8 in	Boston College	2019	New Hampton School	New Hampton, New Hampshire	
20	Courtney Taylor	(United States)	Defense	Left	5 ft 6 in	Boston College	2022	CB South	Chalfont, Pennsylvania	
22	Hannah Dorney	(United States)	Midfield	Left	5 ft 6 in	Notre Dame	2023	Comsewogue	Port Jefferson Station, New York	
23	Jackie Wolak	(United States)	Attack	Right	5 ft 6 in	Notre Dame	2024	Ridgewood	Kinnelon, New Jersey	
24	Lyndsey Muñoz	(United States)	Goalie	Right		Stanford	2014	St. Mary's	California	
31	Andie Aldave	(United States)	Attack	Right	5 ft 6 in	North Carolina	2022	The McDonogh	Baltimore, Maryland	
80	Marge Donovan	(United States)	Defense	Right	5 ft 10 in	Maryland	2022	The McDonogh	Catonsville, Maryland	

(C) indicates captain

=== California Palms ===
- Head coach – Adam Sear
- Assistant coach – Ginny Capicchioni

2025 California Palms
#	Name	Nationality	Position	Shot	Height	College	Grad year	High school	Hometown	Ref.
1	Emily Nalls	(United States)	Defense	Right	5 ft 7 in	North Carolina	2024	Glenelg	Glenwood, Maryland	
3	Sam Geiersbach	(United States)	Attack	Left	5 ft 7 in	North Carolina	2022	West Babylon	West Babylon, New York	
6	Erin Bakes	(United States)	Midfield	Left	5 ft 6 in	USC	2023	Ransom Everglades	Miami, Florida	
7	Isabella Peterson	(United States)	Midfield	Left	6 ft 0 in	James Madison	2024	Hereford	Sparks, Maryland	
12	Ally Mastroianni (C)	(United States)	Midfield	Right	5 ft 9 in	North Carolina	2022	Bridgewater-Raritan	Martinsville, New Jersey	
13	Sammy Jo Tracy	(United States)	Attack	Right	5 ft 4 in	North Carolina	2017	Fox Lane	Bedford, New York	
15	Caitlyn Wurzburger	(United States)	Attack	Right	5 ft 4 in	North Carolina	2024	American Heritage Boca-Delray	Delray Beach, Florida	
19	Maggi Hall	(United States)	Attack	Right	5 ft 11 in	Florida	2024	Bel Air	Bel Air, Maryland	
22	Maggie Bill	(United States)	Attack	Right	5 ft 6 in	North Carolina	2018	St. Anthony's	Huntington, New York	
30	Taylor Moreno	(United States)	Goalie	Right	5 ft 7 in	North Carolina	2022	Huntington	Huntington, New York	
44	Kait Devir	(United States)	Goalie	Left	5 ft 5 in	USC	2024	Ridgewood	Ridgewood, New Jersey	
45	Kayla Wood	(United States)	Defense	Right	5 ft 7 in	North Carolina	2021	Catonsville	Baltimore, Maryland	

(C) indicates captain

=== Maryland Charm ===
- Head coach – Taylor Cummings Danseglio
- Assistant coach – Emily Parros

2025 Maryland Charm
#	Name	Nationality	Position	Shot	Height	College	Grad year	High school	Hometown	Ref.
1	Abby Bosco	(United States)	Defense	Right	5 ft 3 in	Maryland	2023	Suffern	Suffern, New York	
3	Katia Carnevale	(United States)	Midfield	Right	5 ft 3 in	Virginia	2024	Summit	Summit, New Jersey	
5	Aurora Cordingley	(United States)	Attack	Right	5 ft 4 in	Maryland	2022	The Hill Academy	Oakville, Ontario	
7	Jillian Wilson	(United States)	Midfield	Right	5 ft 8 in	Loyola	2020	Gerstell Academy	Hampstead, Maryland	
10	Alex Aust Holman (C)	(United States)	Attack	Right	5 ft 9 in	Maryland	2013	Bullis	Sterling, Virginia	
11	Sydni Black	(United States)	Attack	Right	5 ft 3 in	Loyola	2020	The Summit Country Day	Cincinnati, Ohio	
12	Olivia Dirks	(United States)	Midfield	Right	5 ft 7 in	North Carolina	2024	Episcopal Academy	Wayne, Pennsylvania	
22	Grace Griffin	(United States)	Midfield	Left	5 ft 8 in	Maryland	2022	Liberty	Sykesville, Maryland	
23	Megan Whittle	(United States)	Attack	Right	5 ft 3 in	Maryland	2018	McDonough	Glenwood, Maryland	
25	Lizzie Colson	(United States)	Defense	Right	5 ft 5 in	Maryland	2021	Manchester Valley	Manchester, Maryland	
29	Megan Douty	(United States)	Defense	Right	5 ft 6 in	Maryland	2015	Rumson-Fair Haven Regional	Fair Haven, New Jersey	
31	Paulina DiFatta	(United States)	Goalie	Right	5 ft 7 in	Pitt	2022	Half Hollow Hills West	Dix Hills, New York	
43	Caylee Waters	(United States)	Goalie	Right	5 ft 6 in	North Carolina	2017	Darien	Darien, Connecticut	

(C) indicates captain

=== New York Charging ===
- Head coach – Colleen Magarity
- Assistant coach – Molly Wolf

2025 New York Charging
#	Name	Nationality	Position	Shot	Height	College	Grad year	High school	Hometown	Ref.
1	Lauren Gilbert	(United States)	Midfield	Right	5 ft 6 in	Northwestern	2022	Lake Oswego	Lake Oswego, Oregon	
2	Erin Coykendall	(United States)	Attack	Right	5 ft 5 in	Northwestern	2024	Spencerport	Spencerport, New York	
4	Emma Tyrrell	(United States)	Attack	Right	5 ft 4 in	Syracuse	2024	Mount Sinai	Mount Sinai, New York	
5	Belle Smith	(United States)	Midfield	Right	5 ft 5 in	Boston College	2024	Westhampton Beach	Westhampton Beach, New York	
17	Kylie Ohlmiller	(United States)	Attack	Left	5 ft 3 in	Stony Brook	2024	Islip	Islip, New York	
18	Meg Tyrrell	(United States)	Attack	Left	5 ft 3 in	Syracuse	2023	Mount Sinai	Mount Sinai, New York	
22	Meg Carney	(United States)	Attack	Right	5 ft 5 in	Syracuse	2023	John Paul II	McKinney, Texas	
24	Kendall Halpern	(United States)	Defense	Right	5 ft 8 in	Northwestern	2024	Syosset	Syosset, New York	
27	Izzy Scane (C)	(United States)	Attack	Right	5 ft 8 in	Northwestern	2024	Cranbrook Kingswood	Clarkston, Michigan	
32	Molly Laliberty	(United States)	Goalie	Left	5 ft 4 in	Northwestern	2024	Newburyport	Newburyport, Massachusetts	
51	Emily Hawryschuk	(United States)	Midfield	Right	5 ft 8 in	Syracuse	2022	Victor	Victor, New York	
66	Madison Doucette	(United States)	Goalie	Right	5 ft 6 in	Northwestern	2024	Unionville	West Chester, Pennsylvania	

(C) indicates captain

== Tournament ==
=== 2025 WLL Championship Series ===
Logo of the 2025 WLL Championship Series.

The first tournament, the 2025 WLL Championship Series (sponsor name Maybelline Championship Series), took place on February 11–17, 2025 alongside the 2025 PLL Championship Series at The St. James in Springfield, Virginia – marketed as Washington, D.C. All eight matches were livestreamed on ESPN+, while the playoffs were aired on ESPN2. Jay Alter served as the play-by-play announcer, while Sheehan Stanwick Burch provided analysis, and Dana Boyle served as the sideline reporter.

Each team played a single round robin, after which the top performing team advanced to the Championship game, while the second- and third-best teams played-off for the other spot in the Championship. The tournament was won by the Boston Guard, who defeated the New York Charging in the Championship game, 22–17. Charging midfielder Emily Hawryschuk earned the Golden Stick Award, as the tournament's top scorer (19).

==== Round robin ====
In the opening match, the Charging defeated the Charm, 14–13, after scoring only four goals in the first half. Colleen Magarity's halftime call to employ a "looser" play style led to nine goals in the second half – four of which scored by Emily Hawryschuk, and four assisted by Belle Smith. Kylie Ohlmiller scored the first goal in the WLL's history during the match, having returned to play after a two-year recovery from successive ACL, MCL, and meniscus injuries. Charlotte North and Cassidy Weeks scored five goals each for the Guard against the Palms, though a number of successfully exploited penalties led to a 15–16 loss to an offense buoyed by Ally Mastroianni's six goals and 49 touches. Mastroianni cited Taylor Moreno's assists and transition plays as key to the Palms' victory.

The Guard earned their first win over the Charm, 18–13, in a match noted for an expulsion foul by Alex Aust Holman in the third quarter, and the performance of goalies Kady Glynn and Caylee Waters, who achieved nine and twelve saves, respectively. Despite allowing Moreno to score the WLL's first ever goalie goal off a full-field run, an otherwise strong defensive effort by the Charging forced twenty turnovers by the Palms, leading to a 16–14 victory.

In the final round, the Charm completed a comeback after failing to score in the first eight minutes against the Palms, eventually winning 13–11, with Sydni Black achieving four goals and three assists. However, they were one goal short of overcoming the Palms' goal difference in the pool, and thus failed to qualify for the semifinals. The Guard earned a place in the Championship game after defeating the Charging 20–18 – the highest-scoring game of the round robin. Madison Ahern and Meg Carney scored five goals each during the match, which was described by Chris Rosenthall of Inside Lacrosse as a highly-competitive affair where "neither team was able to build or reduce a lead."

Pos	Team	W	L	GF	GA	GD	Qualification
1	Boston Guard	2	1	53	47	+6	Advance to Championship
2	New York Charging	2	1	48	47	+1	Advance to Semifinals
3	California Palms	1	2	41	44	−3	Advance to Semifinals
4	Maryland Charm	1	2	39	43	−4	

Source: Standings

Feb 11, 7:00pm	Maryland Charm	13–14	New York Charging	Stats
Feb 12, 9:00pm	Boston Guard	15–16	California Palms	Stats
Feb 13, 9:00pm	Maryland Charm	13–18	Boston Guard	Stats
Feb 14, 7:00pm	California Palms	14–16	New York Charging	Stats
Feb 15, 12:30pm	Maryland Charm	13–11	California Palms	Stats
Feb 15, 2:30pm	New York Charging	18–20	Boston Guard	Stats

All times in Eastern Time (ET)

==== Playoffs ====
In the Semifinals, a poor offensive performance by the Palms, who allowed nineteen turnovers and shot under 25%, gave way to a dominating 18–11 victory for the Charging, during which Madison Doucette achieved a tournament-record 21 saves. Kendall Halpern's defensive performance, in which she made five of the team's thirteen forced turnovers, was praised by commentators and the Charging's coaching staff.

In the Championship game, the Guard opened with three goals in the first ninety seconds, while Rachel Hall achieved seven saves in the first quarter, helping build a 5–1 lead that the Charging never surmounted for the rest of the game. Dempsey Arsenault contributed five goals, while Weeks contributed three goals and four assists, to a dominating performance that overcame the Charging's attempts at a comeback in the second and fourth quarters, led by Scane's six goals and one assist.

Emily Hawryschuk (New York Charging) earned the Golden Stick Award with 19 goals.

Semifinals
Feb 16, 10:30am ET, Stats
California Palms	11
New York Charging	18

Championship
Feb 17, 11:00am ET, Stats
New York Charging	17
Boston Guard	22

== All-Star Game ==
Logo of the 2025 PLL All-Star Weekend.

The 2025 WLL All-Star Game (sponsor name Maybelline WLL All-Star Game) was the league's inaugural all-star game, which took place on July 4, 2025 at CPKC Stadium in Kansas City, Missouri, as part of the 2025 PLL All-Star Weekend. Preceded by a skills challenge at 5:30pm Central Daylight Time (CDT) in which PLL and WLL players jointly participated, the match itself was played at 7pm CDT as a traditional game of ten-on-ten women's lacrosse.

Jul 4, 8pm	Team Izzy	24—20	Team North	Stats

Team Izzy

Name	Position	Team
Izzy Scane (C)	Attack	New York Charging
Sam Apuzzo	Attack	Boston College
Ally Mastroianni	Midfield	California Palms
Courtney Taylor	Defense	Boston Guard
Ally Kennedy	Midfield	Stony Brook
Madison Ahern	Attack	Boston Guard
Marie McCool	Midfield	North Carolina
Emily Nalls	Defense	California Palms
Sydni Black	Attack	Maryland Charm
Kendall Halpern	Defense	New York Charging
Ellie Masera	Midfield	Stony Brook
Kayla Wood	Defense	California Palms
Erin Coykendall	Attack	New York Charging
Sam Smith	Midfield	Northwestern
Fallon Vaughn	Midfield	Yale
Kady Glynn	Goalie	Boston Guard
Sam Delaney Sweitzer	Goalie	Northwestern
Livvy Rosenzweig	Attack	Loyola

Team North

Name	Position	Team
Charlotte North (C)	Attack	Boston Guard
Cassidy Weeks	Midfield	Boston Guard
Kenzie Kent	Attack	Boston College
Taylor Moreno	Goalie	California Palms
Dempsey Arsenault	Midfield	Boston Guard
Sydney Scales	Defense	Boston College
Rachel Clark	Attack	Boston College
Anna Brandt	Midfield	Penn
Katie O'Donnell	Midfield	Penn State
Abby Bosco	Defense	Maryland Charm
Maddie Burns	Defense	Michigan
Kasey Choma	Midfield	Boston Guard
Jackie Wolak	Attack	Boston Guard
Jane Hansen	Defense	Northwestern
Emily Hawryschuk	Midfield	New York Charging
Lizzie Colson	Defense	Maryland Charm
Amy Moreau	Midfield	UMass
Erin O'Grady	Goalie	Michigan

(C) indicates captain
