= 2026 Women's Lacrosse League season =

First season of the Women's Lacrosse League

- League: Women's Lacrosse League
- Sport: Field Lacrosse
- Duration: February 27 – March 8
- Teams: 4

Regular season
- Season MVP: Brigid Duffy (Maryland Charm)
- Top scorer: Rachel Clark (Boston Guard)

Playoffs
- Finals champions: New York Charging
- Runners-up: California Palms

WLL seasons
- ← 2025 2027

The 2026 Women's Lacrosse League season will be the second season for the Women's Lacrosse League (WLL). Four teams competed in the WLL's 2026 tournaments: the Boston Guard, California Palms, Maryland Charm, and New York Charging.

The schedule for the inaugural season was announced on January 14, 2026.

== Teams ==
=== Boston Guard ===
- Head coach – Laurie DeLuca
- Assistant coach – Tracey Sullivan, Kevin Merchant

2026 Boston Guard
#	Name	Nationality	Position	Shot	Height	College	Grad year	High school	Hometown	Ref.	Series	Season
1	Rachel Hall	(United States)	Goalie	Right	5 ft 5 in	Boston College	2013	Cypress Woods	Cypress, Texas		Yes	Yes
3	Kasey Choma	(United States)	Midfield	Right	5 ft 5 in	Notre Dame	2024	Eastport-South Manor	Manorville, New York		Yes	Yes
4	Kenzie Kent	(United States)	Attack	Right	5 ft 6 in	Boston College	2019	Noble and Greenough School	Norwell, Massachusetts		No	Yes
5	Rachel Clark	(United States)	Attack	Right	5 ft 9 in	Boston College	2025	Conestoga	Devon, Pennsylvania		No	Yes
6	Grace Callahan	(United States)	Defense	Right	5 ft 7 in	Michigan	2026	Victor Central	Victor, New York		No	Yes
7	Fallon Vaughn	(United States)	Midfield	Right	5 ft 6 in	Yale	2025	Concord-Carlisle	Concord, Massachusetts		Yes	Yes
8	Charlotte North (C)	(United States)	Attack	Right	5 ft 7 in	Boston College	2022	Episcopal School of Dallas	Dallas, Texas		Yes	Yes
10	Madison Ahern	(United States)	Midfield	Right	5 ft 8 in	Notre Dame	2024	Notre Dame Academy	Cohasset, Massachusetts		Yes	Yes
11	Kaylee Dyer	(United States)	Attack	Right	5 ft 7 in	Michigan	2025	William Penn Charter School	Elkins Park, Pennsylvania		No	Yes
12	Cassidy Weeks	(United States)	Midfield	Right	5 ft 5 in	Boston College	2024	Bayport-Blue Point	Bayport, New York		Yes	Yes
13	Maddie Burns	(United States)	Defense	Left	5 ft 10 in	Michigan	2025	Germantown Academy	Philadelphia, Pennsylvania		Yes	Yes
14	Shea Baker	(United States)	Defense	Left	5 ft 6 in	Boston College	2026	Ithaca High School	Ithaca, New York		No	Yes
15	Rachel Clark	(United States)	Attack	Left	5 ft 9 in	Boston College	2025	Conestoga	Devon, Pennsylvania		No	Yes
18	Dempsey Arsenault	(United States)	Midfield	Right	5 ft 8 in	Boston College	2019	New Hampton School	New Hampton, New Hampshire		Yes	Yes
19	Brittany Read	(United States)	Goalie	Right	5 ft 7 in	Oregon	2018	Eastern Regional	Gibbsboro, New Jersey		Yes	No
19	Ava Angello	(United States)	Attack	Right	6 ft 0 in	Johns Hopkins	2026	Fayetteville–Manlius	Manlius, New York		No	Yes
20	Courtney Taylor	(United States)	Defense	Left	5 ft 6 in	Boston College	2022	CB South	Chalfont, Pennsylvania		Yes	Yes
22	Hannah Dorney	(United States)	Midfield	Left	5 ft 6 in	Notre Dame	2023	Comsewogue	Port Jefferson Station, New York		Yes	Yes
28	Maddie Epke	(United States)	Attack	Right	5 ft 8 in	Northwestern	2026	Guilford	Guilford, Connecticut		No	Yes
31	Andie Aldave	(United States)	Attack	Right	5 ft 6 in	North Carolina	2022	The McDonogh	Baltimore, Maryland		Yes	Yes
33	Annabel Frist	(United States)	Midfield	Right	5 ft 10 in	Stanford	2025	The Ensworth School	Nashville, Tennessee		No	Yes
34	Kiley Mottice	(United States)	Midfield	Right	5 ft 8 in	North Carolina	2026	Archbishop John Carroll High School	Downingtown, Pennsylvania		No	Yes
35	Savannah Sweitzer	(United States)	Midfield	Right	5 ft 9 in	Syracuse	2024	Springside Chestnut Hill Academy	Hatfield, Pennsylvania		No	Yes
41	Kerry Nease	(United States)	Midfield	Right	5 ft 8 in	Duke	2025	Freeman High School	Richmond, Virginia		No	Yes
43	Amy Moreau	(United States)	Midfield	Right	5 ft 6 in	UMass	2023	Schuylerville High School	Saratoga Springs, New York		No	Yes
50	Erin O'Grady	(United States)	Goalie	Right	5 ft 7 in	Michigan	2025	St. Anthony's	Massapequa, New York		No	Yes
88	Shea Dolce	(United States)	Goalie	Right	5 ft 10 in	Boston College	2026	Darien High School	Darien, Connecticut		No	Yes
	Isabella Peterson	(United States)	Attack	Left	6 ft 0 in	James Madison	2024	Hereford High School	Sparks, Maryland		No	Yes
	Niki Miles	(United States)	Attack	Right	5 ft 8 in	Northwestern	2024	St. Margaret's Episcopal School	San Clemente, California		No	Yes

(C) indicates captain

=== California Palms ===
- Head coach – Maddy Buss
- Assistant coach – Rachel Sanford, Tricia Alexander

2026 California Palms
#	Name	Nationality	Position	Shot	Height	College	Grad year	High school	Hometown	Ref.	Series	Season
1	Emily Nalls	(United States)	Defense	Right	5 ft 7 in	North Carolina	2024	Glenelg	Glenwood, Maryland		Yes	Yes
2	Emma LoPinto	(United States)	Attack	Right	5 ft 4 in	Boston College	2025	Manhasset High School	Manhasset, New York		No	Yes
3	Sam Geiersbach	(United States)	Attack	Left	5 ft 7 in	North Carolina	2022	West Babylon	West Babylon, New York		Yes	Yes
4	Marie McCool	(United States)	Midfield	Right	5 ft 6 in	North Carolina	2018	Moorestown	Moorestown, New Jersey		No	Yes
5	Emma Muchnick	(United States)	Midfield	Right	5 ft 4 in	Syracuse	2026	Suffern High School	Suffern, New York		No	Yes
6	Erin Bakes	(United States)	Midfield	Left	5 ft 6 in	USC	2023	Ransom Everglades	Miami, Florida		Yes	Yes
7	Olivia Vergano	(United States)	Attack	Right	5 ft 9 in	North Carolina	2025	West Babylon Senior High School	West Babylon, New York		No	Yes
11	Caroline Steele	(United States)	Attack	Right	5 ft 4 in	Maryland	2019	Severn	Severna Park, Maryland		Yes	Yes
12	Ally Mastroianni (C)	(United States)	Midfield	Right	5 ft 9 in	North Carolina	2022	Bridgewater-Raritan	Martinsville, New Jersey		Yes	Yes
13	Sammy Jo Adelsberger	(United States)	Attack	Right	5 ft 4 in	North Carolina	2017	Fox Lane	Bedford, New York		Yes	Yes
14	Jill Smith	(United States)	Attack	Right	5 ft 8 in	Michigan	2025	Mercy	Farmington Hills, Michigan		Yes	Yes
15	Caitlyn Wurzburger	(United States)	Attack	Right	5 ft 4 in	North Carolina	2024	American Heritage Boca-Delray	Delray Beach, Florida		Yes	Yes
16	Ellie Masera	(United States)	Midfield	Right	5 ft 3 in	Stony Brook Seawolves	2025	Eastport-South Manor	Eastport, New York		Yes	Yes
17	Grace Weigand	(United States)	Defense	Right	5 ft 8 in	Notre Dame	2025	Regis Jesuit High School	Denver, Colorado		No	Yes
18, 8	Anna Brandt	(United States)	Midfield	Right	5 ft 7 in	Penn	2025	Hereford	White Hall, Baltimore County, Maryland		Yes	Yes
23	Jackie Wolak	(United States)	Attack	Right	5 ft 6 in	Notre Dame	2024	Ridgewood High School NJ	Kinnelon, New Jersey		No	Yes
24	Gabby Rozenzweig (injured)	(United States)	Attack	Right	5 ft 4 in	Duke	2020	Somers	Somers, New York		Yes	Yes
26	Coco Vandiver	(United States)	Defense	Right	5 ft 5 in	Syracuse	2026	McDonogh School	Baltimore, Maryland		No	Yes
30	Taylor Moreno	(United States)	Goalie	Right	5 ft 7 in	North Carolina	2022	Huntington	Huntington, New York		Yes	Yes
32	Katie Detwiler	(United States)	Defense	Right	5 ft 5 in	Loyola	2023	Archbishop Carroll High School	Devon, Pennsylvania		No	Yes
44	Kait Devir	(United States)	Goalie	Left	5 ft 5 in	USC	2024	Ridgewood	Ridgewood, New Jersey		Yes	Yes
45	Kayla Wood	(United States)	Defense	Right	5 ft 7 in	North Carolina	2021	Catonsville	Baltimore, Maryland		Yes	Yes
91	Jordan Dean	(Canada)	Defense	Right	5 ft 9 in	UMass	2025	Brooklin High School	Greenbank, Ontario		No	Yes

(C) indicates captain

=== Maryland Charm ===
- Head coach – Emily Parros
- Assistant coach – Corey Donohoe, MC Byrne

2026 Maryland Charm
#	Name	Nationality	Position	Shot	Height	College	Grad year	High school	Hometown	Ref.	Series	Season
1	Abby Bosco	(United States)	Defense	Right	5 ft 3 in	Maryland	2023	Suffern	Suffern, New York		Yes	Yes
2	Sam Apuzzo	(United States)	Attack	Right	5 ft 6 in	Boston College	2019	West Babylon	West Babylon, New York		No	Yes
3	Sam Swart	(United States)	Midfield	Right	5 ft 5 in	Syracuse	2021	Archbishop Carroll	Coopersburg, Pennsylvania		Yes	Yes
4	Livy Rosenzweig	(United States)	Attack	Right	5 ft 7 in	Loyola	2022	Somers	Katonah, New York		No	Yes
5	Aurora Cordingley	(United States)	Attack	Right	5 ft 4 in	Maryland	2022	The Hill Academy	Oakville, Ontario		Yes	Yes
6	Claudia Kelly	(United States)	Defense	Right	5 ft 5 in	North Carolina	2025	Red Bank Regional	Little Silver, New Jersey		No	Yes
6	Caroline Wakefield	(United States)	Defense	Right	5 ft 8 in	North Carolina	2021	Centreville High School	Centreville, Virginia		No	Yes
7	Chase Boyle	(United States)	Midfield	Right	5 ft 9 in	Loyola	2025	Rumson-Fair Haven Regional	Rumson, New Jersey		No	Yes
8	Cassidy Spilis	(United States)	Midfield	Right	5 ft 7 in	Rutgers	2024	Seneca	Tabernacle, New Jersey		No	Yes
9	Nicole Humphrey	(United States)	Midfield	Right	5 ft 4 in	North Carolina	2025	Darien High School	Darien, Connecticut		No	Yes
10	Alex Aust Holman (C)	(United States)	Attack	Right	5 ft 9 in	Maryland	2013	Bullis	Sterling, Virginia		Yes	Yes
11	Sydni Black	(United States)	Attack	Right	5 ft 3 in	Loyola	2020	The Summit Country Day	Cincinnati, Ohio		Yes	Yes
12	Olivia Dirks	(United States)	Midfield	Right	5 ft 7 in	North Carolina	2024	Episcopal Academy	Wayne, Pennsylvania		Yes	Yes
17	Sam Forrest	(United States)	Defense	Right	5 ft 5 in	North Carolina	2026	Glastonbury High School	Glastonbury, Connecticut		No	Yes
18	Ashley Humphrey	(United States)	Midfield	Right	5 ft 4 in	North Carolina	2025	Darien High School	Darien, Connecticut		No	Yes
21	Brigid Duffy	(United States)	Midfield	Right	5 ft 6 in	US Military Academy	2026	Queensbury High School	Queensbury, New York		No	Yes
22	Grace Griffin	(United States)	Midfield	Left	5 ft 8 in	Maryland	2022	Liberty	Sykesville, Maryland		Yes	Yes
23	Jenika Cuocco	(United States)	Goalie	Right	5 ft 7 in	Northwestern	2026	Rocky Point High School	Sound Beach, New York		No	Yes
27	Maddy Sterling	(United States)	Defense	Right	5 ft 7 in	Maryland	2026	The John Carroll School	Bel Air, Maryland		No	Yes
29	Megan Douty-Marino	(United States)	Defense	Right	5 ft 6 in	Maryland	2015	Rumson-Fair Haven Regional	Fair Haven, New Jersey		Yes	Yes
30	Ally Kennedy	(United States)	Midfield	Right	5 ft 3 in	Stony Brook	2025	North Babylon	North Babylon, New York		Yes	Yes
31	Paulina DiFatta	(United States)	Goalie	Right	5 ft 7 in	Pitt	2022	Half Hollow Hills West	Dix Hills, New York		Yes	Yes
33	Emily Sterling	(United States)	Goalie	Right	5 ft 5 in	Maryland	2024	The John Carroll School	Bel Air, Maryland		No	Yes
34	McKenzie Blake	(United States)	Attack	Right	5 ft 9 in	Princeton	2025	Haddonfield	Haddonfield, New Jersey		Yes	Yes
35	Brooklyn Neumen	(United States)	Midfield	Right	5 ft 7 in	North Carolina	2023	Rockford High School	Rockford, Michigan		No	Yes
37	Erica Evans	(Canada)	Midfield	Right	5 ft 8 in	Maryland	2019	St. Peter's Secondary School	Peterborough, Ontario		No	Yes
43	Caylee Waters	(United States)	Goalie	Right	5 ft 6 in	North Carolina	2017	Darien	Darien, Connecticut		Yes	Yes
55	Kelly Denes	(United States)	Midfield	Right	5 ft 10 in	Notre Dame	2024	Cardinal Newman	Jupiter, Florida		Yes	Yes
	Sam DeVito	(United States)	Midfield	Right	5 ft 8 in	Syracuse	2024	Ballston Spa High School	Ballston Spa, New York		No	Yes

(C) indicates captain

=== New York Charging ===
- Head coach – Colleen Magarity
- Assistant coach – Amy Orcutt, Charlie Leonard

2026 New York Charging
#	Name	Nationality	Position	Shot	Height	College	Grad year	High school	Hometown	Ref.	Series	Season
1	Lauren Gilbert	(United States)	Midfield	Right	5 ft 6 in	Northwestern	2022	Lake Oswego	Lake Oswego, Oregon		Yes	Yes
2	Erin Coykendall	(United States)	Attack	Right	5 ft 5 in	Northwestern	2024	Spencerport	Spencerport, New York		Yes	Yes
3	Mckenna Davis	(United States)	Attack	Right	5 ft 6 in	Boston College	2025	Canandaigua Academy	Canandaigua, New York		No	Yes
4	Emma Tyrrell	(United States)	Attack	Right	5 ft 4 in	Syracuse	2024	Mount Sinai	Mount Sinai, New York		Yes	No
5	Chase Boyle	(United States)	Midfield	Right	5 ft 10 in	Loyola	2025	Rumson-Fair Haven Regional	Rumson, New Jersey		Yes	Yes
7	Jillian Wilson	(United States)	Midfield	Right	5 ft 8 in	Loyola	2020	Gerstell Academy	Hampstead, Maryland		Yes	No
10	Alyssa Long	(United States)	Midfield	Right	5 ft 3 in	North Carolina	2024	Springfield High School	Springfield Delco		No	Yes
11	Darcy Felter	(United States)	Midfield	Right	5 ft 6 in	North Carolina	2026	William Penn Charter School	Wyndmoor, Pennsylvania		No	Yes
12	Katie Goodale	(United States)	Defense	Right	5 ft 5 in	Syracuse	2024	Riverhead	Riverhead, New York		Yes	Yes
13	Delaney Sweitzer	(United States)	Goalie	Right	5 ft 9 in	Northwestern	2025	Chestnut Hill Academy	Hatfield, Pennsylvania		No	Yes
14	Kori Edmondson	(United States)	Midfield	Right	5 ft 8 in	Maryland	2026	McDonogh School	Severn, Maryland		No	Yes
15	Natalie Smith	(United States)	Midfield	Right	5 ft 4 in	Syracuse	2024	St. Anthony High School	Port Washington, Wisconsin		No	Yes
17	Riley Campbell	(United States)	Attack	Right	5 ft 9 in	Northwestern	2025	Oak Knoll	Madison, New Jersey		No	Yes
18	Allison Reilly	(United States)	Attack	Right	5 ft 6 in	US Military Academy	2026	Sayville High School	Sayville, New York		No	Yes
19	Sam Smith	(United States)	Midfield	Left	5 ft 7 in	Northwestern	2025	Tamalpais	Mill Valley, California		Yes	Yes
20	Ava Class	(United States)	Midfield	Right	5 ft 7 in	Michigan	2026	McDonogh School	Hunt Valley, Maryland		No	Yes
22	Meg Carney	(United States)	Attack	Right	5 ft 5 in	Syracuse	2023	John Paul II	McKinney, Texas		Yes	Yes
23	Sammy White	(United States)	Defense	Right	5 ft 6 in	Northwestern	2025	Dulaney High School	Timonium, Maryland		No	Yes
24	Kendall Halpern	(United States)	Defense	Right	5 ft 8 in	Northwestern	2024	Syosset	Syosset, New York		Yes	Yes
27	Izzy Scane (C)	(United States)	Attack	Right	5 ft 8 in	Northwestern	2024	Cranbrook Kingswood	Clarkston, Michigan		Yes	Yes
32	Molly Laliberty	(United States)	Goalie	Left	5 ft 4 in	Northwestern	2024	Newburyport	Newburyport, Massachusetts		Yes	Yes
36	Grace Fujinaga	(United States)	Midfield; Defense	Right	5 ft 5 in	Northwestern	2025	The Overlake School	Mercer Island, Washington		Yes	Yes
43	Sierra Cockerille	(United States)	Midfield	Right	5 ft 10 in	Syracuse	2022	Roland Park Country School	Baltimore, Maryland		No	Yes
45, 4	Emerson Bohlig	(United States)	Midfield	Right	5 ft 5 in	Northwestern	2025	Miramonte High School	Orinda, California		Yes	Yes
45	Sydney Scales	(United States)	Defense	Right	5 ft 6 in	Boston College	2024	Walpole	Walpole, Massachusetts		No	Yes
51	Emily Hawryschuk	(United States)	Midfield; Attack	Right	5 ft 8 in	Syracuse	2022	Victor	Victor, New York		Yes	Yes
66	Madison Doucette	(United States)	Goalie	Right	5 ft 6 in	Northwestern	2024	Unionville	West Chester, Pennsylvania		Yes	Yes
80	Marge Donovan	(United States)	Midfield	Right	5 ft 10 in	Maryland	2022	McDonogh School	Catonsville, Maryland		No	Yes
	Hailey Rhatigan	(United States)	Attack	Right	5 ft 5 in	Northwestern	2023	Sachem North	Holbrook, New York		No	Yes

(C) indicates captain

== 2026 WLL Championship Series ==
The second tournament, the 2026 WLL Championship Series (sponsor name Maybelline Championship Series), took place on February 27 to March 8, 2026, alongside the 2026 PLL Championship Series at The St. James in Springfield, Virginia – marketed as Washington, D.C..

Each team played a single round robin, after which the top performing team advanced to the Championship game, while the second- and third-best teams played-off for the other spot in the Championship.

=== Round robin ===
Pos	Team	W	L	GF	GA	GD	Qualification
1	California Palms	2	1	53	42	+11	Advance to Championship
2	New York Charging	2	1	39	39	0	Advance to Semifinals
3	Boston Guard	1	2	51	52	−1	Advance to Semifinals
4	Maryland Charm	1	2	48	58	−10	

Source: Standings

Feb 27, 6:00pm	New York Charging	11–10	Boston Guard	Stats
Feb 28, 12:00pm	California Palms	22–15	Boston Guard	Stats
Feb 28, 2:00pm	Maryland Charm	18–12	New York Charging	Stats
Mar 1, 10:30am	California Palms	20–11	Maryland Charm	Stats
Mar 5, 8:00pm	New York Charging	16–11	California Palms	Stats
Mar 6, 6:00pm	Boston Guard	26–19	Maryland Charm	Stats

All times in Eastern Time (ET)

=== Playoffs ===
Semifinals
Boston Guard	13
New York Charging	16

Championship
New York Charging	18
California Palms	11

Mar 7, 4:30pm	Boston Guard	13–16	New York Charging	Stats
Mar 8, 10:00am	New York Charging	18–11	California Palms	Stats

All times in Eastern Time (ET)

The New York Charging win the 2026 WLL Championship Series and Charlotte North (Boston Guard) earned the Golden Stick Award.

== 2026 Women's Lacrosse League Season ==
The 2026 Women's Lacrosse League season will be the inaugural season of the Women's Lacrosse League (WLL). The season will begin on Saturday, May 16 at Centreville Bank Stadium in Pawtucket, Rhode Island and will culminate with a championship game will be played on Saturday, August 15 at Subaru Park in the Philadelphia suburb of Chester, Pennsylvania.

=== Schedule ===
Week	Date	Games	Time (ET)	Network (Note: All games streamed on ESPN+ alongside the network listed.)	Venue	City
1	May 16	New York Charging (17–12) Boston Guard	5:30 pm	ESPN+	Centreville Bank Stadium	Rhode Island
2	May 29	California Palms (17–18 OT) Maryland Charm	8:30 pm	ESPN+	Ridley Athletic Complex	Baltimore, MD
3	June 6	Boston Guard (15–17) California Palms	1 pm	ESPN+	American Legion Memorial Stadium	Charlotte, NC
4	June 20	Maryland Charm (10–12) New York Charging	6:30 pm	ESPN+	James M. Shuart Stadium	Long Island
5	June 27	New York Charging (9–16) California Palms	11 pm	ESPN+	Torero Stadium	San Diego, CA
WLL All Star Game	July 5	Team Humphrey (15–16) Team Izzy	5:30 pm	ESPN2	Navy–Marine Corps Memorial Stadium	Annapolis, MD
6	July 11	Maryland Charm (16–15) New York Charging	7 pm	ESPN+	Northwestern Medicine Field at Martin Stadium	Chicago, IL
7	July 17	Boston Guard (17–21) Maryland Charm	8:30 pm	ESPN+	Rafferty Stadium	Fairfield, CT
8	August 8	California Palms (21-9) Boston Guard	5:30 pm	ESPN2	Harvard Stadium	Boston, MA
WLL Championship fueled by Gatorade	August 15	Maryland Charm (16-13) California Palms	5 pm	ESPN	Subaru Park	Philadelphia, PA

Notes

The Maryland Charm win the 2026 WLL Championship and Sydni Black (Maryland Charm) was named the first-ever WLL Championship Gatorade MVP.

=== Standings ===
2026 Season Standings
Team	W	L	SF	SA	Diff
California Palms	3	1	71	51	20
Maryland Charm	3	1	65	61	4
New York Charging	2	2	53	54	-1
Boston Guard	0	4	53	76	−23

Notes

Advance to 2026 WLL Championship Game

Source: Standings

== Regular-season statistical leaders ==
Individual
Statistic	Player	Position	Team
Points	Rachel Clark (23)	Attack	Boston Guard
Goals	Rachel Clark (18)	Attack	Boston Guard
Assists	Ashley Humphrey (14)	Midfield	Maryland Charm
Shots	Rachel Clark (43)	Attack	Boston Guard
Shot Percentage	Annabel Frist (100%)	Midfield	Boston Guard
Touches	Brigid Duffy (198)	Midfield	Maryland Charm
Faceoff Percentage	Maddie Epke (71%)	Attack	Boston Guard
Save Percentage	Madison Doucette (55%)	Goaltender	New York Charging
Caused Turnovers	Abby Bosco (12)	Defense	Maryland Charm
Groundballs	Sam Smith (39)	Midfield	New York Charging

Team
Statistic	Team
Offensive
Scores	California Palms (71)
Shots	California Palms (190)
Shot Percentage	California Palms (37%)
Turnovers (High)	Boston Guard (90)
Turnovers (Low)	California Palms (62)
Defensive
Scores Against Average (Low)	California Palms (51)
Scores Against Average (High)	Boston Guard (76)
Caused Turnovers	Maryland Charm (55)
Groundballs Recovered	Maryland Charm (201)
Saves	New York Charging (61)
Save Percentage	New York Charging (53%)
Power Play and Penalty Kill
Power-play Goal Percentage	Boston Guard (47%)
Power-play Goals	Boston Guard (9)
Penalties (Low)	Maryland Charm (11)
Penalties (High)	Boston Guard (23)
Penalty Minutes (Low)	Maryland Charm (7)
Penalty Minutes (High)	Boston Guard (16)

== Awards ==
=== Players of the Week ===
Date Awarded	Player	Team	Ref.
May 26	Izzy Scane	New York Charging	
June 3	Ashley Humphrey	Maryland Charm	
June 12	Maddie Epke	Boston Guard	
June 26	Madison Doucette	New York Charging	
July 5	Marie McCool	California Palms	
July 8	Marie McCool	California Palms	
July 17	Jenika Cuocco	Maryland Charm	
August 16	Sydni Black	Maryland Charm	

=== Individual Season Awards ===
On September 2, the WLL announced the finalists for its inaugural season awards via social media platforms.

On September 18, Winners revealed live at the WLL/PLL End of Season Awards Ceremony.

==== List of awards and finalists ====
The winner of the award are highlighted in bold.

===== Attacker of the Year =====
- Sydni Black (Maryland Charm)
- **Rachel Clark** (Boston Guard)
- Sam Apuzzo (Maryland Charm)
- Emma Lopinto (California Palms)

===== Defensive Player of the Year =====
- Emily Nalls (California Palms)
- **Abby Bosco** (Maryland Charm)
- Sydney Scales (New York Charging)
- Shea Baker (Boston Guard)

===== Goalie of the Year =====
- Caylee Waters (Maryland Charm)
- **Madison Doucette** (New York Charging)
- Taylor Moreno (California Palms)

===== Midfielder of the Year =====
- Ellie Masera (California Palms)
- Ally Kennedy (Maryland Charm)
- Marie McCool (California Palms)
- **Brigid Duffy** (Maryland Charm)

===== Teammate Award =====
- Caylee Waters (Maryland Charm)
- Delaney Sweitzer (New York Charging)
- **Alex Holman** (Maryland Charm)

===== Leadership Award =====
- **Charlotte North** (Boston Guard)
- Alex Holman (Maryland Charm)
- Ally Mastroianni (California Palms)

===== Welles Crowther Humanitarian Award =====
- Izzy Scane (New York Charging)
- **Ally Mastroianni** (California Palms)
- Sydni Black (Maryland Charm)

===== Most Valuable Player =====
- **Brigid Duffy** (Maryland Charm)
- Taylor Moreno (California Palms)
- Sydni Black (Maryland Charm)
- Ally Kennedy (Maryland Charm)

===== Coach of the Year =====
- **Emily Parros** (Maryland Charm)

== See also ==
- 2026 Premier Lacrosse League season
