= Sports in Massachusetts =

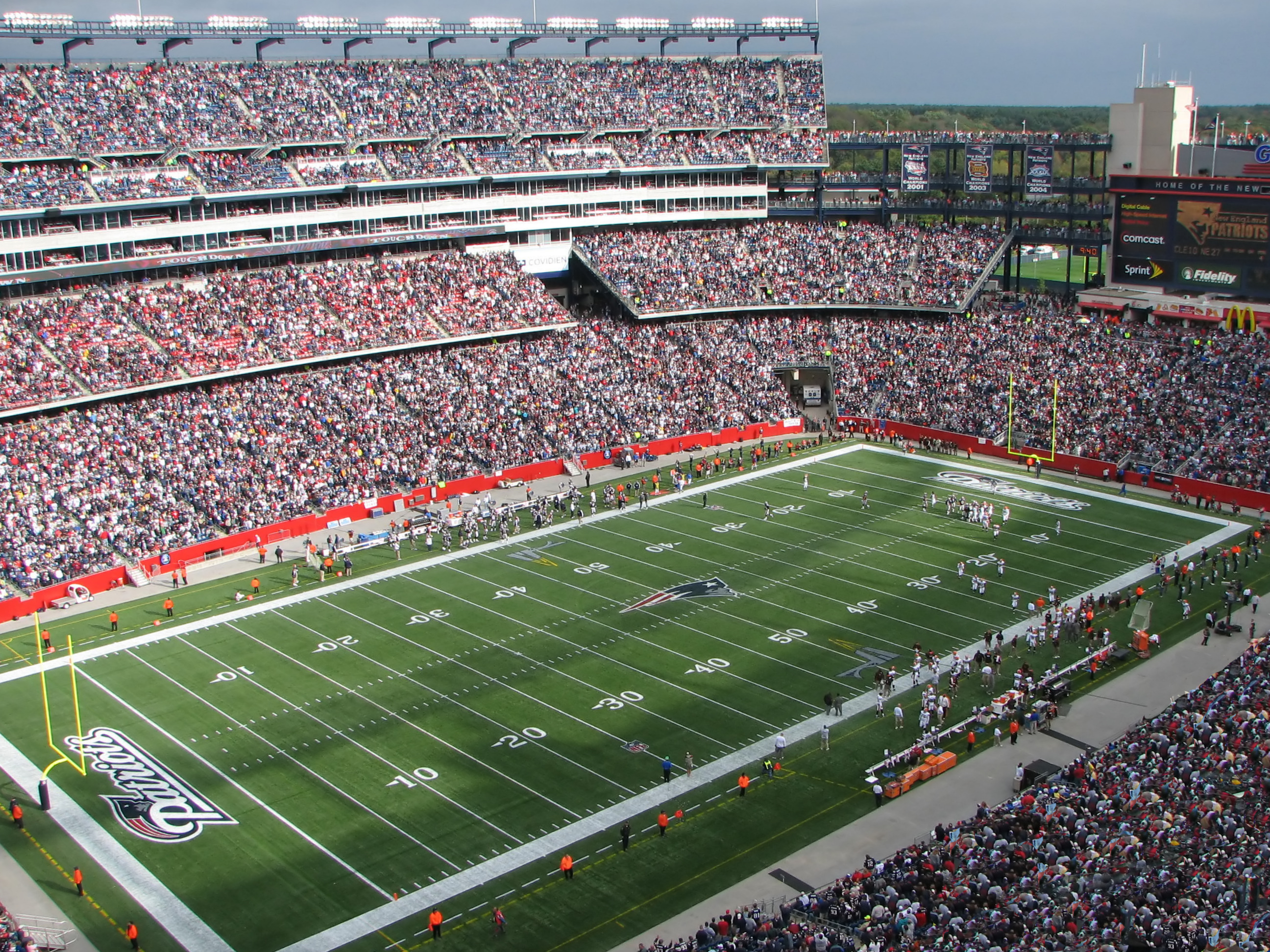
Gillette Stadium, located in Foxborough, Massachusetts, is the home stadium of the NFL's New England Patriots and MLS' New England Revolution

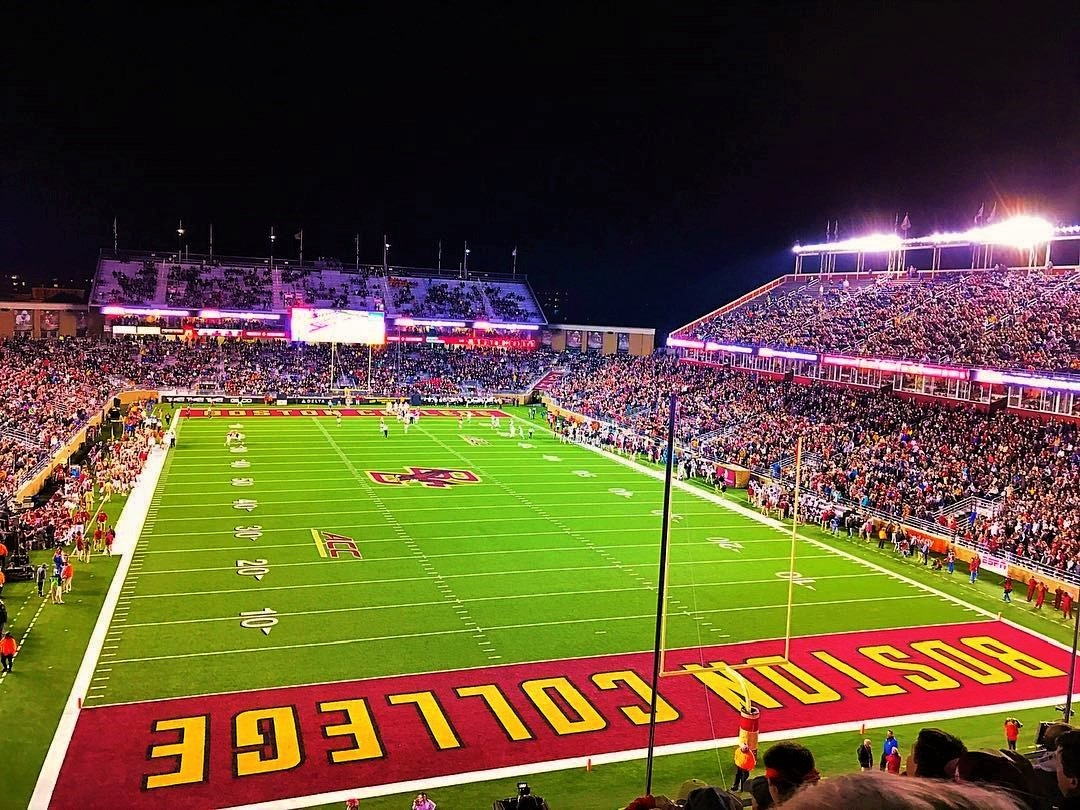
Alumni Stadium, located in Chestnut Hill, Massachusetts, is the home stadium of the Boston College Eagles

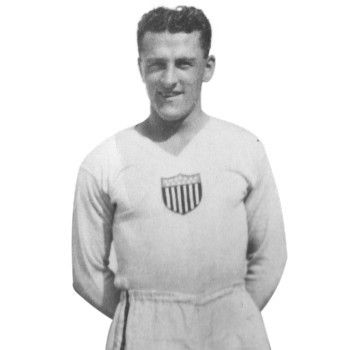
Bert Patenaude, a native of Fall River, Massachusetts, scored the first hat-trick in FIFA World Cup history in 1930 for the United States

Sports in Massachusetts have a long history with both amateur athletics and professional teams. Most of the major professional teams have won multiple championships in their respective leagues. For instance, as of July 2025, Massachusetts teams have won 6 Stanley Cups (Boston Bruins), 18 NBA championships (Boston Celtics), 6 Super Bowls (New England Patriots), and 10 World Series (9 Boston Red Sox, 1 Boston Braves). Additionally, the New England Revolution won the U.S. Open Cup in 2007 and the MLS Supporter's Shield in 2021. Massachusetts is also notable for being the birthplace of both basketball and volleyball, and it is home to the Basketball Hall of Fame (Springfield) and the Volleyball Hall of Fame (Holyoke). Moreover, the state hosts the Cape Cod Baseball League and prestigious sports events such as the Boston Marathon and the Head of the Charles Regatta (Boston). Other popular sports events in Massachusetts include the Falmouth Road Race in running, which started in 1973, and the Fitchburg Longsjo Classic, an annual bicycle race held from 1960 to 2020.

The Greater Boston region is the only city/surrounding area in American professional sports in which all facilities are privately owned and operated. The Kraft Sports Group, which holds ownership of both the Patriots and New England Revolution (a Major League Soccer team), owns Gillette Stadium located in Foxborough, Massachusetts. Fenway Sports Group, led by principal owner John W. Henry, owns both Fenway Park and the Boston Red Sox. TD Garden is owned by Delaware North, and its chairman, Jeremy M. Jacobs, along with his family, owns the Bruins. The Celtics rent TD Garden from Delaware North.

The PGA Tour Deutsche Bank Championship was a regular professional golf tournament held from 2003 to 2018 in Norton, Massachusetts. As of July 2025, Massachusetts has played host to ten U.S. Opens, four U.S. Women's Opens, two Ryder Cups, and two U.S. Senior Open.

Massachusetts is home to many colleges and universities that are active in college athletics, hosting several NCAA Division I (D-I) institutions that compete in multiple sports. The D-I schools include Boston College, Boston University, Northeastern University, Harvard University, College of the Holy Cross, the University of Massachusetts Amherst, the University of Massachusetts Lowell, Merrimack College, and Stonehill College.

== Notable athletes from Massachusetts ==
Massachusetts has produced several successful Olympians including Thomas Burke, James Connolly, and John Thomas (track & field); Butch Johnson (archery); Nancy Kerrigan (figure skating); Todd Richards (snowboarding); Albina Osipowich (swimming); Aly Raisman (gymnastics); Patrick Ewing (basketball); as well as Jim Craig, Mike Eruzione, Bill Cleary, and Keith Tkachuk (ice hockey).

Notable soccer (or association football) players from Massachusetts include Bert Patenaude, Billy Gonsalves, Geoff Cameron, Miles Robinson, Sam Mewis, and Kristie Mewis. Patenaude and Gonsalves, both inductees of the National Soccer Hall of Fame and natives of Fall River, Massachusetts, played for the U.S. men's national team at the inaugural FIFA World Cup in 1930 (hosted in Uruguay). Patenaude scored the first hat-trick in World Cup history. The USMNT finished in third place.

=== Sports Illustrated's 50 Greatest Sports Figures from Massachusetts ===
In 1999, Sports Illustrated published the fifty (50) greatest 19th and 20th century sports figures from each U.S. state. The criteria used was "not necessarily to where [the athletes] were born, but to where they first showed flashes of the greatness to come." The ten highest ranked Massachusetts athletes were as follows:

Rank	Name	Sport	Hometown	Notes
1.	Rocky Marciano	Boxing	Brockton, MA	Held the world heavyweight title from 1952 to 1956
2.	Doug Flutie	American football	Natick, MA	Played at Boston College; won the Heisman Trophy in 1984
3.	Patrick Ewing	Basketball	Cambridge, MA	Played at Cambridge Rindge and Latin School; 2× Olympic gold medalist (1984, 1992); selected as one of the 75 Greatest Players in NBA History in 2021; Basketball Hall of Fame inductee
4.	Bobby Carpenter	Ice hockey	Beverly, MA	First U.S. player to jump from high school to NHL (in 1981)
5.	Rebecca Lobo	Basketball	Southwick, MA	Massachusetts' all-time leading high school basketball scorer (boys and girls); Basketball Hall of Fame inductee
6.	Alberto Salazar	Track & field	Wayland, MA	3× New York Marathon winner (1980–82); Boston Marathon winner (1982)
7.	Tom Glavine	Baseball	Billerica, MA	2× NL Cy Young Award (1991, 1998); 1995 World Series MVP; Baseball Hall of Fame inductee
8.	Pie Traynor	Baseball	Somerville, MA	Posted a career batting average of .320; Baseball Hall of Fame inductee
9.	Harry Agganis	Baseball; American football	Lynn, MA	Played at Boston University; Boston Red Sox (1954–55); College Football Hall of Fame inductee
10.	Johnny Kelley	Track & field	Arlington, MA	Olympian; competed in the Boston Marathon over 50 times (winning twice)

== Major League Professional Teams ==
=== Current teams ===
Club	League	Sport	Venue (capacity)	Founded	Championships
Boston Red Sox	MLB	Baseball	Fenway Park (37,500)	1901	9 World Series
Boston Bruins	NHL	Ice Hockey	TD Garden (17,565)	1924	6 Stanley Cups
Boston Celtics	NBA	Basketball	TD Garden (18,625)	1946	18 NBA titles
New England Patriots	NFL	Football	Gillette Stadium (68,750)	1960	6 Super Bowls
New England Revolution	MLS	Soccer	Gillette Stadium (68,750)	1995	0 MLS Cups; 1 Supporters' Shield

=== Former teams ===
Club	League	Sport	Venue (capacity)	Founded	Dissolved	Championships
Boston Braves	MLB	Baseball	Braves Field (40,000)	1871	1952	1 World Series
Worcester Brown Stockings	MLB	Baseball	Worcester Agricultural Fairgrounds	1880	1882	
Boston Reds	MLB	Baseball	Congress Street Grounds	1890	1891	
Boston Bulldogs	NFL	Football	Braves Field (40,000)	1929	1929	
Boston Redskins	NFL	Football	Fenway Park (35,000)	1932	1936	
Boston Yanks	NFL	Football	Fenway Park (35,000)	1944	1948	
Boston Breakers	USFL	Football	Nickerson Field (15,000)	1983	1984	
Boston Rovers	NASL	Soccer	Manning Bowl (21,000)	1967	1967	
Boston Beacons	NASL	Soccer	Fenway Park (33,375)	1968	1968	
Boston Minutemen	NASL	Soccer	Alumni Stadium (30,000); Nickerson Field (15,000)	1974	1976	
New England Tea Men	NASL	Soccer	Foxboro Stadium (60,000)	1978	1980	
New England Whalers	WHA	Ice Hockey	Boston Garden (14,448)	1972	1974	1 Avco World Trophy

== Major league professional championships ==
=== Boston Red Sox (MLB) ===
9 World Series titles

- 1903
- 1912
- 1915
- 1916
- 1918
- 2004
- 2007
- 2013
- 2018

=== Boston Braves (MLB) ===
1 World Series title

- 1914

=== New England Patriots (NFL) ===
6 Super Bowl titles

- 2001 (XXXVI)
- 2003 (XXXVIII)
- 2004 (XXXIX)
- 2014 (XLIX)
- 2016 (LI)
- 2018 (LIII)

=== Boston Celtics (NBA) ===
18 NBA Finals titles

- 1957
- 1959
- 1960
- 1961
- 1962
- 1963
- 1964
- 1965
- 1966
- 1968
- 1969
- 1974
- 1976
- 1981
- 1984
- 1986
- 2008
- 2024

=== Boston Bruins (NHL) ===
6 Stanley Cup titles

- 1929
- 1939
- 1941
- 1970
- 1972
- 2011

=== New England Whalers (WHA) ===
1 Avco World Trophy

- 1973

== Minor League or Semi-Professional Clubs ==
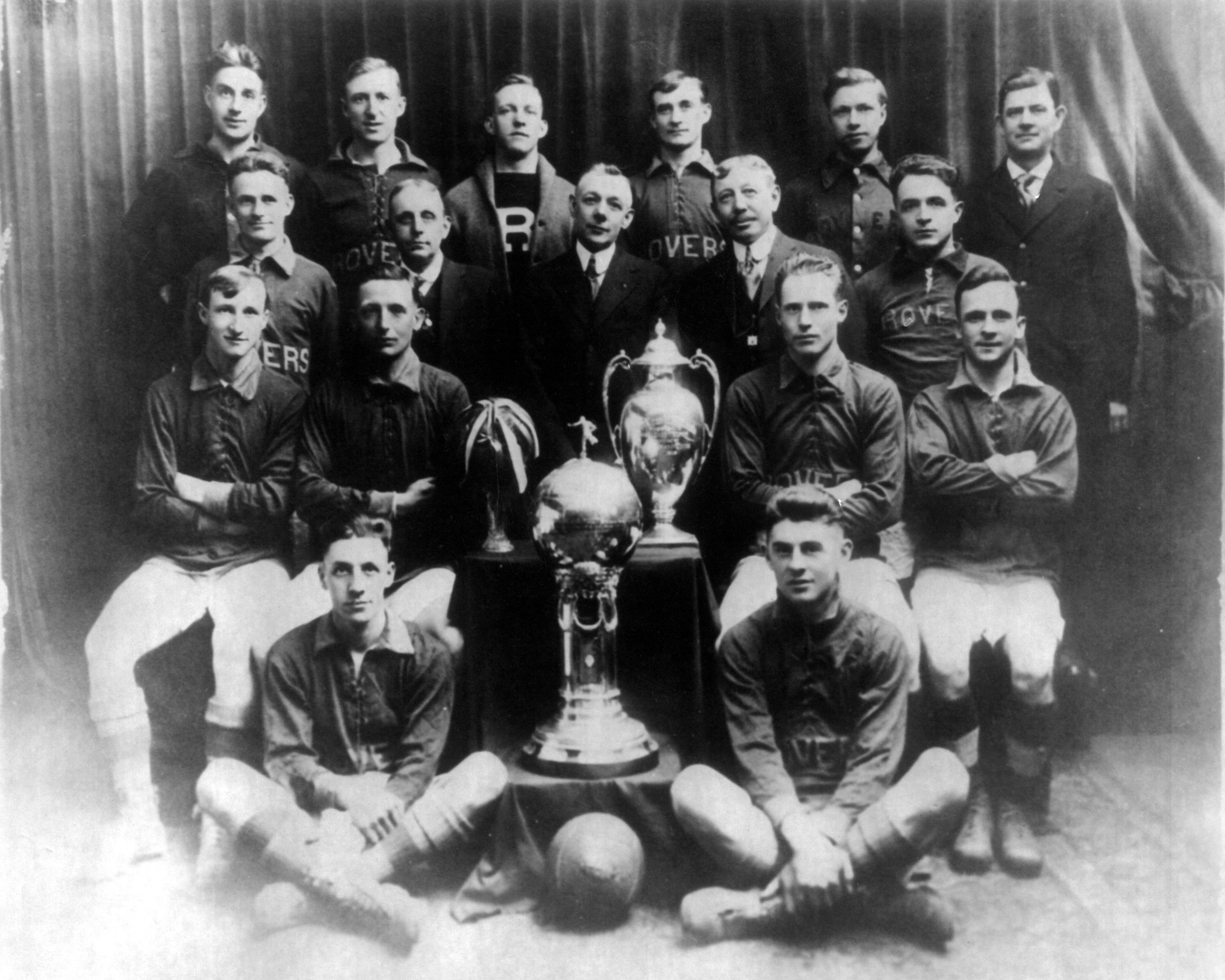
The Fall River Rovers soccer club (a semi-professional club in the Southern New England Soccer League) after winning the 1917 U.S. Open Cup

=== Other professional teams ===
Club	League	Sport	Venue (capacity)	Founded	Championships
Boston Fleet	PWHL	Ice Hockey	Tsongas Center (6,500)	2023	
Boston Cannons	PLL	Lacrosse	"Barnstorming"	2001	2 Steinfeld Trophies (MLL) 2 PLL Championship Series Trophies
Boston Guard	WLL	Lacrosse	"Barnstorming"	2025	1 WLL Championship Trophy
Boston Legacy FC	NWSL	Soccer	White Stadium (10,519)	2026	
Boston Glory	UFA	Ultimate	Hormel Stadium	2019	1 UFA Championship Trophy
Boston Hunters	WPBL	Baseball	Robin Roberts Stadium	2026	
New England Free Jacks	MLR	Rugby Union	Veterans Memorial Stadium (5,000)	2018	3 MLR Shields

=== Minor league teams ===
Club	Pro Affiliate	League	Conference / Division	Sport	Venue (Capacity)	Founded	Championships
Worcester Red Sox	Boston Red Sox	International	East	Baseball	Polar Park (9,508)	2021	4 Governors' Cup (As PawSox)
Brockton Rox	Independent	Frontier	Atlantic	Baseball	Campanelli Stadium (4,750)	2024	0 Frontier League Championships
Springfield Thunderbirds	St. Louis Blues (NHL) / Worcester Railers (ECHL)	AHL	Eastern / Atlantic	Ice Hockey	MassMutual Center (6,800)	1975	0 Calder Cup
Worcester Railers	St. Louis Blues (NHL) / Springfield Thunderbirds (AHL)	ECHL	Eastern / North	Ice Hockey	DCU Center (12,135)	2017	0 Kelly Cup
New England Revolution II	New England Revolution	MLS Next Pro	Eastern	Soccer	Gillette Stadium (68,750)	2019	0 MLS Next Pro Championships

== College sports ==
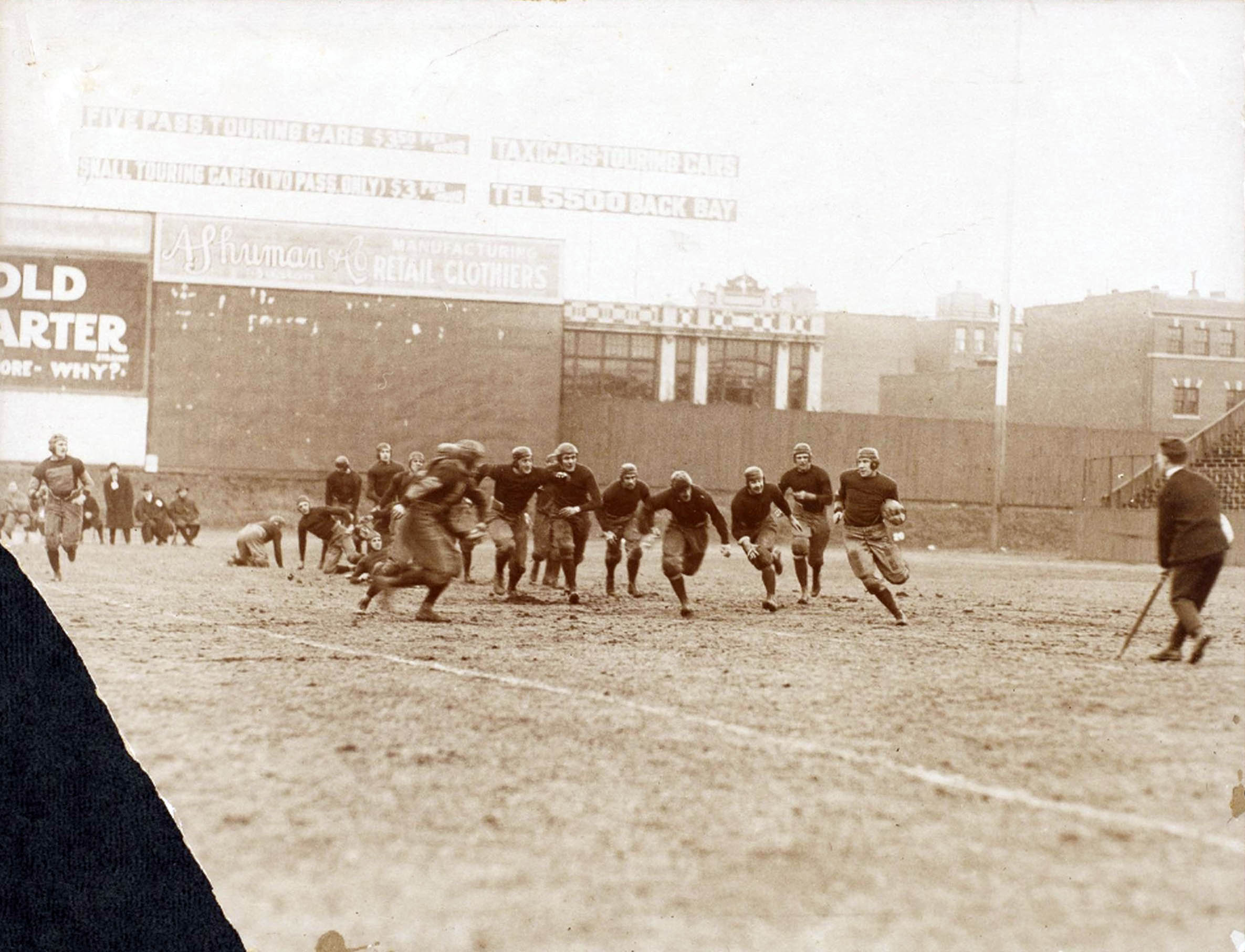
Holy Cross takes on Boston College in 1916 at Fenway Park. Boston College won the game, 17–14.

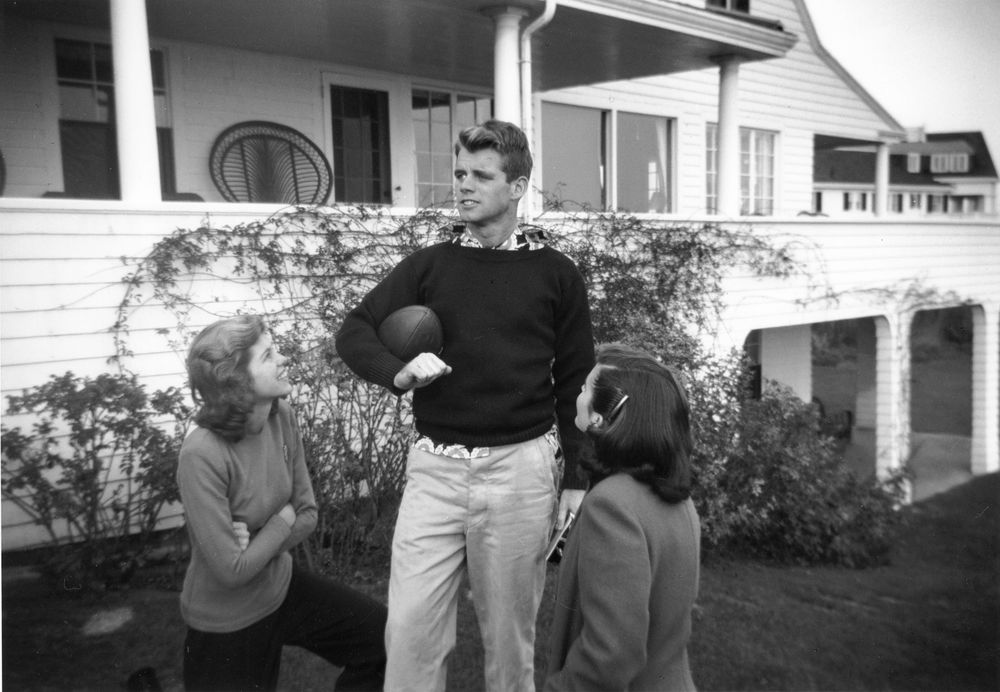
Robert F. Kennedy, a native of Brookline, Massachusetts and brother of President John F. Kennedy, was an end at Milton Academy and Harvard

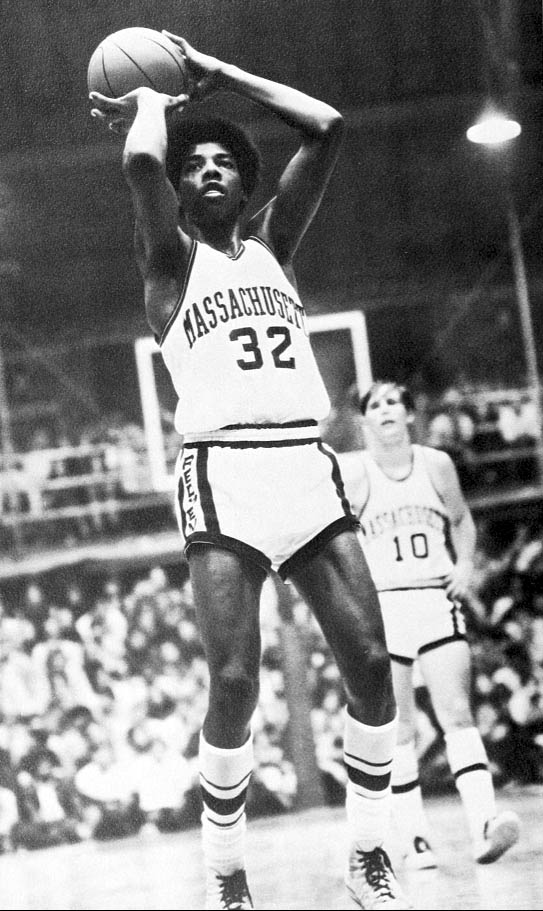
Julius "Dr. J." Erving playing at UMass during the 1970–71 season

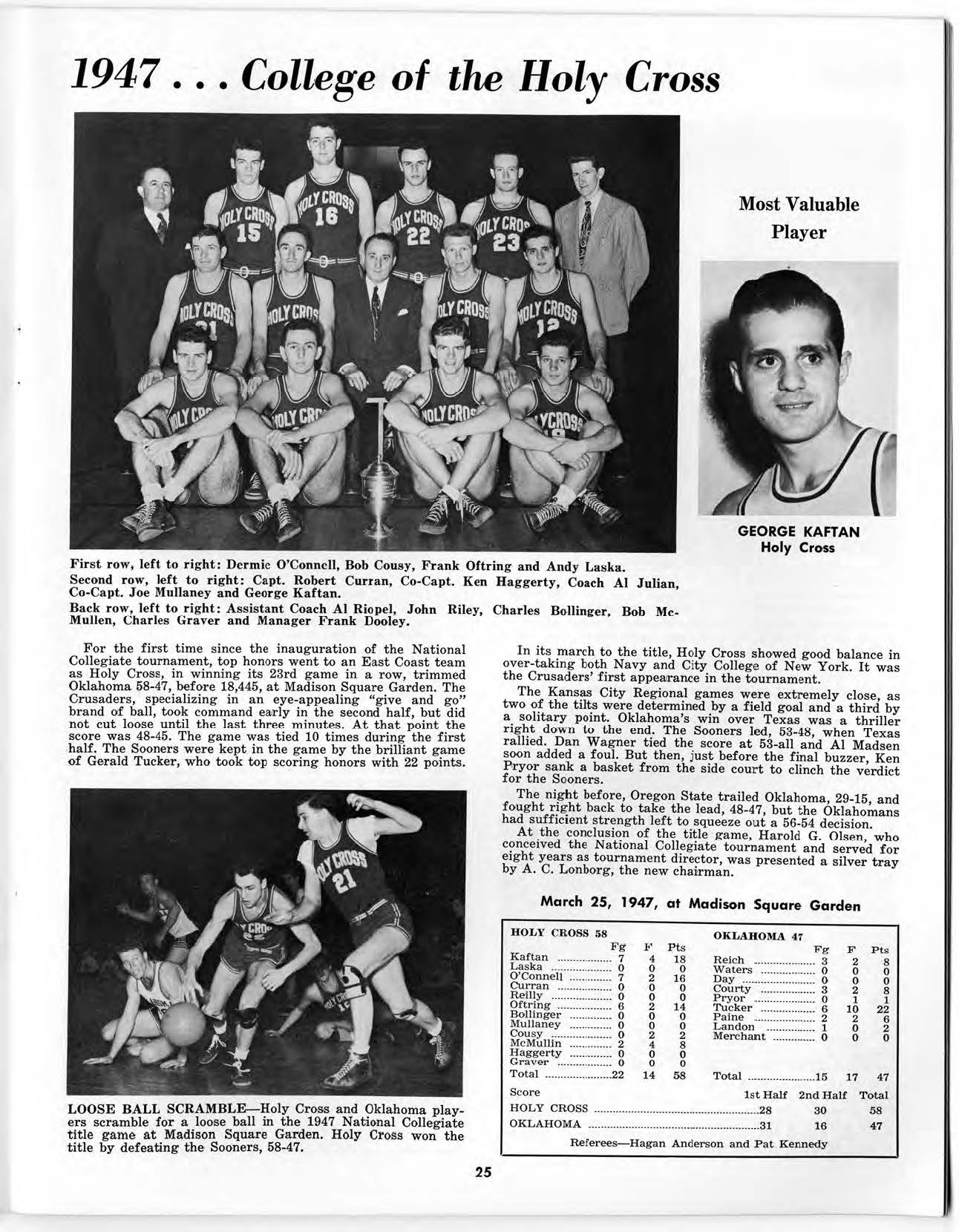
The Holy Cross Crusaders won the NCAA basketball championship in 1947, defeating Oklahoma 58-47. Bob Cousy (All-American and NBA Hall-of-Famer) is in the front row, second from left

=== NCAA: Divisions I and II ===
School	Nickname	Division	Conference
Boston College	Eagles	I	Atlantic Coast Conference/Hockey East
Boston University	Terriers	I	Patriot League/Hockey East
Northeastern University	Huskies	I	Coastal Athletic Association/Hockey East
Harvard University	Crimson	I	Ivy League/ECAC Hockey
College of the Holy Cross	Crusaders	I	Patriot League/Atlantic Hockey America/Hockey East
University of Massachusetts Amherst	Minutemen/ Minutewomen	I	Mid-American Conference/Hockey East
University of Massachusetts Lowell	River Hawks	I	America East Conference/Hockey East
Merrimack College	Warriors	I	Metro Atlantic Athletic Conference/FCS independent (football)/Hockey East
Stonehill College	Skyhawks	I	Northeast Conference/Independent (men's ice hockey)/New England Women's Hockey Alliance
American International College	Yellow Jackets	I/II	Atlantic Hockey America (Note: Leaving Division I men's ice hockey in July 2025, aligning that team with the rest of its athletic program in the Division II Northeast-10 Conference.)/Northeast-10 Conference
Bentley University	Falcons	I/II	Atlantic Hockey America/Northeast-10 Conference
Assumption University	Greyhounds	I/II	Northeast-10 Conference/New England Women's Hockey Alliance

In addition to the schools listed here, Franklin Pierce University, a full Division II member located near the state border in Rindge, New Hampshire, plays its men's and women's ice hockey home games in Massachusetts on the campus of The Winchendon School. FPU plays men's hockey in the Northeast-10 and women's hockey as a D-I program in the New England Women's Hockey Alliance.

=== NCAA: Division III ===
School	Nickname	Division	Conference
Amherst College	Mammoths	III	Eastern College Athletic Conference/New England Small College Athletic Conference
Anna Maria College	Amcats	III	Great Northeast Athletic Conference/Eastern Collegiate Football Conference (Note: The Eastern Collegiate Football Conference disbanded at the end of the 2024 football season. Anna Maria and Dean will play football in the Massachusetts State Collegiate Athletic Conference starting in 2025.)
Babson College	Beavers	III	New England Women's and Men's Athletic Conference
Brandeis University	Judges	III	University Athletic Association/Intercollegiate Fencing Association
Bridgewater State University	Bears	III	Eastern College Athletic Conference/Massachusetts State Collegiate Athletic Conference/ Little East Conference
Clark University	Cougars	III	New England Women's and Men's Athletic Conference
Curry College	Colonels	III	Conference of New England
Dean College	Bulldogs	III	Great Northeast Athletic Conference/Eastern Collegiate Football Conference
Eastern Nazarene College	Lions	III	North Atlantic Conference (Note: Eastern Nazarene will close at the end of the 2024–25 academic year.)
Elms College	Blazers	III	Great Northeast Athletic Conference
Emerson College	Lions	III	New England Women's and Men's Athletic Conference/Eastern College Athletic Conference
Emmanuel College	Saints	III	Great Northeast Athletic Conference
Endicott College	Gulls	III	Conference of New England/New England Volleyball Conference
Fitchburg State University	Falcons	III	Massachusetts State College Athletic Conference
Framingham State University	Rams	III	Massachusetts State Collegiate Athletic Conference
Gordon College	Fighting Scots	III	Conference of New England
Lasell University	Lasers	III	Great Northeast Athletic Conference
Lesley University	Lynx	III	North Atlantic Conference
Mount Holyoke College	Lyons	III	New England Women's and Men's Athletic Conference
Massachusetts College of Liberal Arts	Trailblazers	III	Eastern College Athletic Conference/Massachusetts State Collegiate Athletic Conference
Massachusetts Maritime Academy	Buccaneers	III	Massachusetts State Collegiate Athletic Conference/New England Women's and Men's Athletic Conference
Massachusetts Institute of Technology	Engineers	III/I	New England Women's and Men's Athletic Conference/Patriot League/Collegiate Water Polo Association
Nichols College	Bison	III	Conference of New England/New England Volleyball Conference
Regis College	Pride	III	Great Northeast Athletic Conference
Salem State University	Vikings	III	Massachusetts State Collegiate Athletic Conference
Simmons University	Sharks	III	Great Northeast Athletic Conference/North Atlantic Conference
Smith College	Pioneers	III	New England Women's and Men's Athletic Conference
Springfield College	Pride	III	New England Women's and Men's Athletic Conference
Suffolk University	Rams	III	Great Northeast Athletic Conference
Tufts University	Jumbos	III	New England Small College Athletic Conference
University of Massachusetts Boston	Beacons	III	Little East Conference/New England Hockey Conference
University of Massachusetts Dartmouth	Corsairs	III	Little East Conference/Massachusetts State Collegiate Athletic Conference
Wellesley College	Blues	III	New England Women's and Men's Athletic Conference
Wentworth Institute of Technology	Panthers	III	Conference of New England/Great Northeast Athletic Conference
Western New England University	Golden Bears	III	Conference of New England
Westfield State University	Owls	III	Massachusetts State Collegiate Athletic Conference
Wheaton College, Massachusetts	Lyons	III	New England Women's and Men's Athletic Conference
Williams College	Ephs	III / I	New England Small College Athletic Conference
Worcester Polytechnic Institute	Engineers	III	New England Women's and Men's Athletic Conference
Worcester State University	Lancers	III	Massachusetts State Collegiate Athletic Conference

=== NAIA ===
School	Nickname	Conference
Fisher College	Falcons	Independent

=== USCAA ===
School	Nickname	Conference
Bay Path University	Wildcats	Independent
Hampshire College	Black Sheep	Yankee Small College Conference

=== NJCAA Division II ===
School	Nickname	Region
Massasoit Community College	Warriors	21

=== NJCAA Division III ===
School	Nickname	Region
Benjamin Franklin Institute of Technology	Shockers	21
Bristol Community College	Bayhawks	21
Bunker Hill Community College	Bulldogs	21
Holyoke Community College	Cougars	21
Mass Bay Community College	Buccaneers	21
Northern Essex Community College	Knights	21
Quinsigamond Community College	Chiefs	21
Roxbury Community College	Tigers	21
Springfield Technical Community College	Rams	21

== High school ==
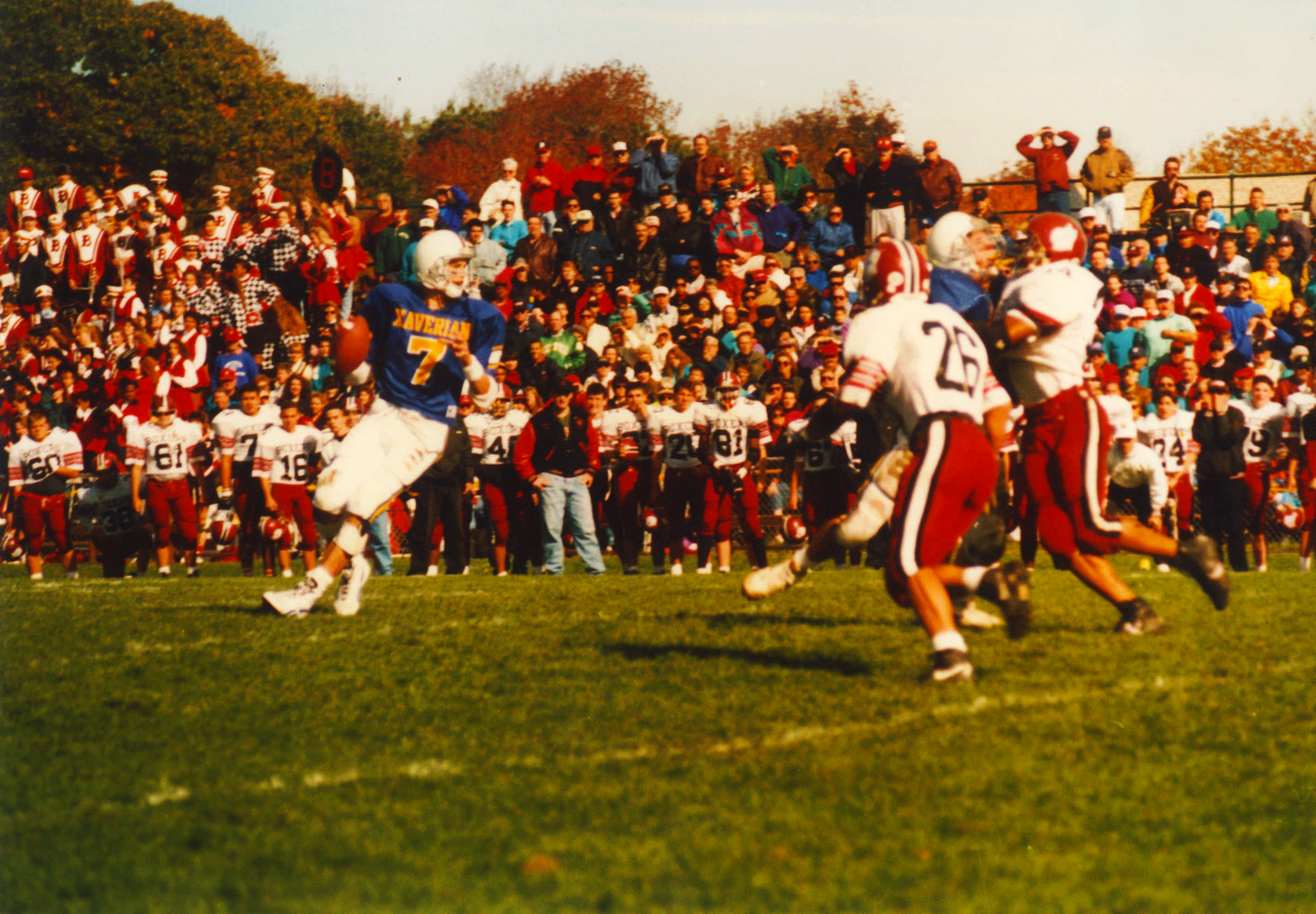
Matt Hasselbeck (Pro-Bowl NFL quarterback) playing at Xaverian Brothers High School in Westwood, Massachusetts

The Massachusetts Interscholastic Athletic Association (MIAA) is an organization that sponsors activities in thirty-three sports, with 383 public and private member high schools in Massachusetts as of November 2023. The MIAA is a member of the National Federation of State High School Associations (NFHS), which writes the rules for most U.S. high school sports and activities. Established in 1978, the MIAA succeeded the Massachusetts Secondary School Principals' Association (MSSPA), which operated from 1942 to 1978, and the Massachusetts Interscholastic Athletic Council (MIAC), active from 1950 to 1978.

In 2016, the MIAA recognized rugby as the 35th sport following a vote in 2015 that passed by a wide majority. As of 2022, there are 19 MIAA boys’ teams and 7 MIAA girls’ teams across the state. By 2025, four boys' teams were competing in Division I and seven in Division II, while four girls' teams competed in Division I.
