= ACC Athlete of the Year =

America collegiate athletic award

Atlantic Coast Conference Athlete of the Year
- Description: Annual award presented to the top male and female student-athletes in the Atlantic Coast Conference
- Country: United States
- Presented by: Atlantic Coast Sports Media Association

The Atlantic Coast Conference Athlete of the Year award is given to the male and female athlete who show extraordinary talent throughout the entire season. The award is decided by members of the Atlantic Coast Sports Media Association.

== Anthony J. McKevlin Award ==
The Anthony J. McKevlin Award, which originally went to the league's athlete of the year regardless of gender until 1990, named in honor of a former sports editor of the Raleigh News and Observer, has been voted upon and handed out annually since the ACC was formed in 1953–1954.

== Mary Garber Award ==
In 1990, The Mary Garber Award, named in honor of Mary Garber, a former Winston-Salem Journal reporter and a pioneer for women in the field of sports journalism, was established to honor the league's top female athlete. In 2005, the Associated Press Sports Editors (APSE) distinguished Garber by honoring her with its prestigious Red Smith Award, making her the first female recipient in the award's 25-year history.

== Recipients ==
	Male – Anthony J. McKevlin Award			Female – Mary Garber Award
Season	Player	School	Sport	Player	School	Sport
1954	Joel Shankle	Duke	Track & Field
1955	Dickie Hemric	Wake Forest	Basketball
1956	Dave Sime	Duke	Track & Field/Baseball
1957	Lennie Rosenbluth	North Carolina	Basketball
1958	Dick Christy	NC State	Football
1959	Lou Pucillo	NC State	Basketball
1960	Mike McGee	Duke	Football
1961	Roman Gabriel	NC State	Football
1962	Len Chappell	Wake Forest	Basketball
1963	Art Heyman	Duke	Basketball
1964	Jeff Mullins	Duke	Basketball
1965	Brian Piccolo	Wake Forest	Football
1966	Danny Talbott	North Carolina	Football/Baseball
1967	Bobby Bryant	South Carolina	Football/Baseball
1968	Larry Miller	North Carolina	Basketball
1969	Frank Quayle	Virginia	Football
1970	Charlie Scott	North Carolina	Basketball
1971	Don McCauley	North Carolina	Football
1972	Barry Parkhill	Virginia	Basketball
1973	David Thompson	NC State	Basketball
1974	Tony Waldrop	North Carolina	Track & Field
1975	David Thompson	NC State	Basketball
1976	John Lucas	Maryland	Basketball/Tennis
1977	Phil Ford	North Carolina	Basketball
1978	Phil Ford	North Carolina	Basketball
1979	Renaldo Nehemiah	Maryland	Track & Field
1980				Julie Shea*	NC State	Track & Field
1981				Julie Shea*	NC State	Track & Field
1982	James Worthy	North Carolina	Basketball
1983	Ralph Sampson	Virginia	Basketball
1984	Michael Jordan	North Carolina	Basketball
1985	BJ Surhoff	North Carolina	Baseball
1986	Len Bias	Maryland	Basketball
1987	Riccardo Ingram	Georgia Tech	Football/Baseball
1988	Danny Ferry	Duke	Basketball
1989	Danny Ferry	Duke	Basketball
1990	Clarkston Hines	Duke	Football	Shannon Higgins	North Carolina	Soccer
1991	Christian Laettner	Duke	Basketball	Dawn Staley	Virginia	Basketball
1992	Christian Laettner	Duke	Basketball	Dawn Staley	Virginia	Basketball
1993	Charlie Ward	Florida State	Football/Basketball	Mia Hamm	North Carolina	Soccer
1994	Charlie Ward	Florida State	Football/Basketball	Mia Hamm	North Carolina	Soccer
1995	Randolph Childress	Wake Forest	Basketball	Tisha Venturini	North Carolina	Soccer
1996	Kris Benson	Clemson	Baseball	Kelly Amonte	Maryland	Soccer/Lacrosse
1997	Tim Duncan	Wake Forest	Basketball	Sarah Forbes	Maryland	Lacrosse
1998	Antawn Jamison	North Carolina	Basketball	Vanessa Webb	Duke	Tennis
1999	Elton Brand	Duke	Basketball	Cindy Parlow	North Carolina	Soccer
2000	Joe Hamilton	Georgia Tech	Football	Jen Adams	Maryland	Lacrosse
2001	Shane Battier	Duke	Basketball	Jen Adams	Maryland	Lacrosse
2002	Juan Dixon	Maryland	Basketball	Bea Bielik	Wake Forest	Tennis
2003	Chris Rotelli	Virginia	Lacrosse	Alana Beard	Duke	Basketball
2004	Philip Rivers	NC State	Football	Alana Beard	Duke	Basketball
2005	Sean May	North Carolina	Basketball	Kelly Dostal	Wake Forest	Field hockey
2006	JJ Redick	Duke	Basketball	Paula Infante	Maryland	Field hockey
2007	Walter Dix	Florida State	Track and field	Lindsey Harding	Duke	Basketball
2008	Tyler Hansbrough	North Carolina	Basketball	Angela Tincher	Virginia Tech	Softball
2009	Matt Hill	NC State	Golf	Casey Nogueira	North Carolina	Soccer
2010	Ned Crotty	Duke	Lacrosse	Whitney Engen	North Carolina	Soccer
2011	Ngoni Makusha	Florida State	Track and field	Katie O'Donnell	Maryland	Field hockey
2012	Luke Kuechly	Boston College	Football	Becca Ward	Duke	Fencing
2013	Jarmere Jenkins	Virginia	Tennis	Crystal Dunn	North Carolina	Soccer
2014	Jameis Winston	Florida State	Football/Baseball	Alyssa Thomas	Maryland	Basketball
2015	Laken Tomlinson	Duke	Football	Morgan Brian	Virginia	Soccer
2016	Deshaun Watson	Clemson	Football	Molly Seidel	Notre Dame	Cross Country
2017	Deshaun Watson	Clemson	Football	Kenzie Kent	Boston College	Ice hockey/Lacrosse
2018	Lamar Jackson	Louisville	Football	Arike Ogunbowale	Notre Dame	Basketball
2019	Zion Williamson	Duke	Basketball	Ashley Hoffman	North Carolina	Field hockey
2020	Robbie Robinson	Clemson	Soccer	Erin Matson	North Carolina	Field hockey
2021	Trevor Lawrence	Clemson	Football	Charlotte North	Boston College	Lacrosse
2022	Kenny Pickett	Pittsburgh	Football	Charlotte North	Boston College	Lacrosse
2023	Rhett Lowder	Wake Forest	Baseball	Katelyn Tuohy	NC State	Cross country/track & field
2024	Pat Kavanagh	Notre Dame	Lacrosse	Gretchen Walsh	Virginia	Swimming
2025	Cooper Flagg	Duke	Basketball	Gretchen Walsh	Virginia	Swimming
2026	Cameron Boozer	Duke	Basketball	Olivia Babcock	Pittsburgh	Volleyball
* Between 1954 and 1989, Anthony J. McKevlin Award presented to best athlete, male or female.

== See also ==
- Atlantic Coast Conference
- ACC Men's Basketball Player of the Year
- NCAA Woman of the Year Award
- List of awards honoring women
