= Caitlyn Wurzburger =

American lacrosse player (born 2001)

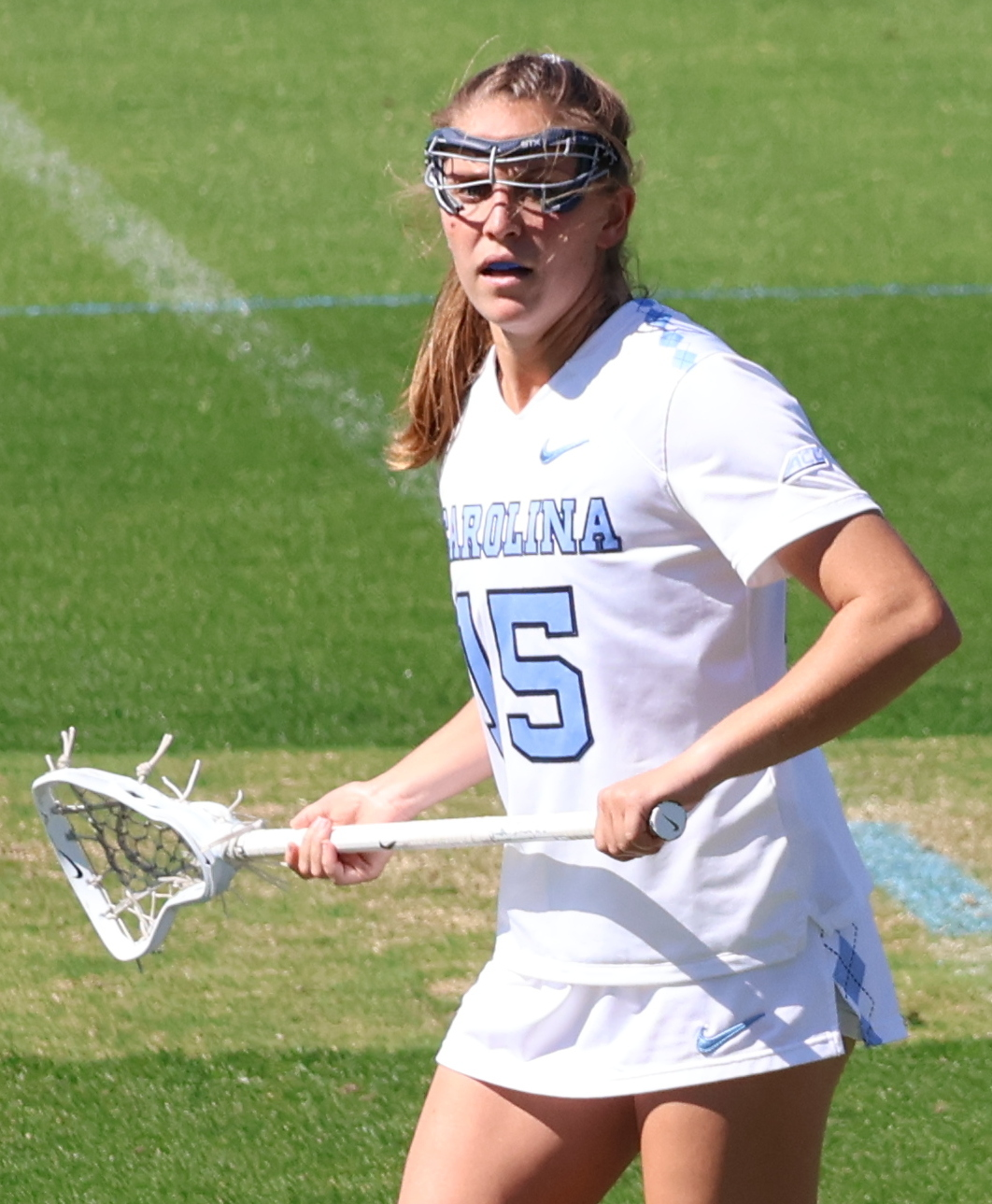
- Wurzburger with North Carolina in 2024

Personal information
- Born: July 26, 2001 (age 25) Kansas City, Missouri, U.S.
- Height: 5 ft 4 in (163 cm)

Sport
- Position: Attack
- NCAA team: North Carolina Tar Heels (2021–2024)
- WLL team: California Palms
Medal record
Representing United States
Lacrosse
Under-19 World Lacrosse Championships
| Gold medal – first place | 2019 Peterborough |
Lacrosse sixes
World Games
| Silver medal – second place | 2022 Birmingham |

Caitlyn Molly Wurzburger (born July 26, 2001) is an American professional lacrosse player for the California Palms of the Women's Lacrosse League (WLL). She became the country's all-time top scorer in high school at the American Heritage School in Delray Beach, Florida, and was the top-ranked recruit of the class of 2020. She played college lacrosse for the North Carolina Tar Heels, where she won the 2022 NCAA tournament. She represented the United States national team at the 2022 World Games.

== Early life and high school career ==
Wurzburger was born in Kansas City, Missouri, to Leslie and Robert Wurzburger, and raised in Delray Beach, Florida. Her father played college lacrosse for Maryland (and coached her high school and club teams), and her uncle John was a two-time All-American for Cornell. She took up lacrosse at age five. She played club lacrosse for Florida Select and also ran cross country in high school.

Wurzburger captained the varsity lacrosse team at the American Heritage School in Delray Beach from its inception when she was in seventh grade in 2015. She recorded 58 goals and 42 assists in 11 games that season. Before her eighth grade season in 2016, she verbally committed at age 14 to play at Syracuse, but she switched to the University of North Carolina in 2018. She recorded 100 goals and 103 assists as an eighth grader, becoming the first player known to have more than 100 of each in one season. The next year, she recorded 101 goals and 115 assists as the team went 19–1, reaching the regional finals.

As a sophomore in 2018, Wurzburger recorded 105 goals and 116 assists, leading American Heritage to a 23–1 record and their first FHSAA state title. She received All-American honors for the third year in a row and was named the Inside Lacrosse National High School Player of the Year. She recorded 104 goals and 105 assists as a junior in 2019, leading the team to the state semi-finals, and was Florida's Miss Lacrosse as the best player in the state for the third year in a row. Her last season was shortened by the COVID-19 pandemic in 2020. She finished high school with the all-time national scoring record of 1,027 points, on 503 goals and 524 assists, and was considered the No. 1 recruit of her class.

== College career ==
Wurzburger played for the North Carolina Tar Heels from 2021 to 2024. In her first year, she was named to the ACC All-Freshman team as North Carolina went undefeated until the semi-finals of the 2021 NCAA tournament, falling to Boston College. She recorded a career-high 42 assists as a sophomore, making the USA Lacrosse All-American third team, as North Carolina went 22–0 to become undefeated national champions, beating Boston College in the final of the 2022 NCAA tournament. As a junior in 2023, she scored a career-high 37 goals and led the team with 35 assists. She was named to the All-ACC second team in each of her last three seasons. She concluded her college career with 251 career points (fourth-most in program history) on 115 assists (also fourth) and 136 goals.

== International career ==
Wurzburger represented the United States at the Under-19 World Lacrosse Championships in 2019, one of three high school students on the championship-winning team, and scored once and assisted twice to help put away the final over Canada. She led the team with 21 goals (tied with Izzy Scane) and a tournament-record 19 assists and was one of five Americans named to the All-World team.

Wurzburger won silver in lacrosse sixes with the senior national team at the 2022 World Games, recording 7 goals and 11 assists in the tournament.
