= Episcopal School of Dallas =

Private school in Dallas, Texas, US

The Episcopal School of Dallas
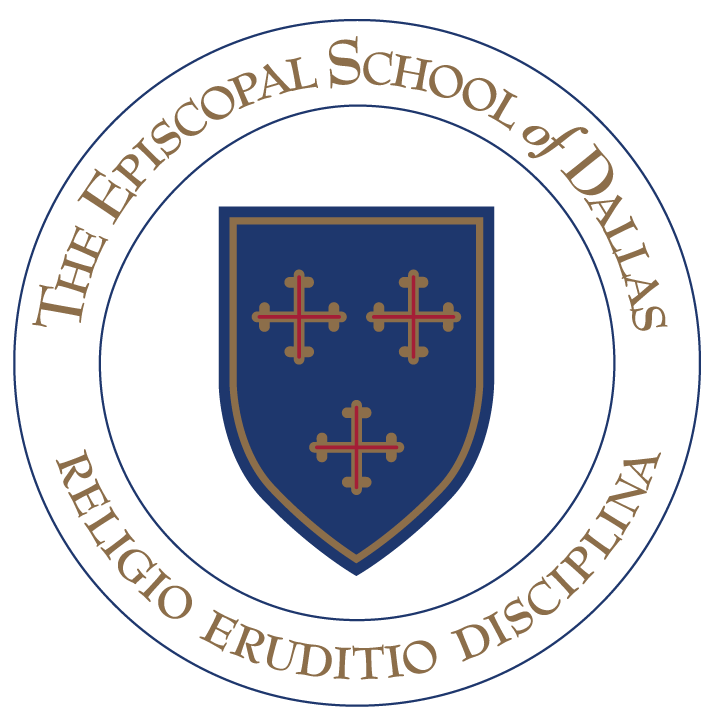

Location
- 4100 Merrell Road; Dallas, Texas 75229; United States; 32°53′12″N 96°50′28″W

Information
- Type: Private
- Motto: Religio, Disciplina, Eruditio (Faith, Discipline, Sound Learning)
- Denomination: Episcopal
- Established: 1974
- Head of School: David Baad
- Faculty: 200+
- Grades: Pre-K–12.
- Gender: Co-ed
- Enrollment: 1,195
- Student to teacher ratio: 7:1; some AP Courses: as low as 1:1
- Campus: 39 acres (160,000 m^{2}) Wolf Run- Outdoor Education Facility 300 acres (1.2 km^{2})
- Colors: Blue and white
- Athletics: 25 varsity teams; 70+ total teams, 19 sports
- Athletics conference: Southwest Preparatory Conference
- Mascot: Eagle
- Accreditation: Independent Schools Association of the Southwest (ISAS)
- Newspaper: ESD Eagle Edition
- Tuition: Around $39,500 per year
- Website: www.esdallas.org

The Episcopal School of Dallas (ESD) is an independent, co-educational preparatory day school located in Dallas, Texas.

== History ==
The Episcopal School of Dallas is a coeducational academic community founded in 1974 by Stephen B. Swann and a group of Episcopalian local leaders. The school began as an offshoot from St. Mark's School of Texas when a few members of the board wanted it to become a solely Episcopal school. The first ESD class was held in 1974 and included eight 7th graders. Today, approximately 1,150 students attend ESD, aged Beginner (age 3) through 12th grade, with 435 students in the Upper School (9th – 12th grade). David L. Baad is the Head of School.

== Campus ==
The campus contains four major buildings, with a total of 308,000 sq ft (28,600 m²) in facilities. The campus encompasses over 39 acres (160,000 m^{2}). The school's first building, the gymnasium, was built in the late 1970s. Until the main building was in 1981, classes were held in the gym. In 1986, the school had another major expansion, which added a library, publication suite, and fine arts facilities, along with additional classrooms and offices.

The Cook Math and Science Building was completed in 1994 to allow the construction of additional science labs, computer labs, and math classrooms. Daily chapel was moved from the gym to the All Saints Chapel following its completion in 2002. In 2005, another project, the Susan M. Frank Center for Arts and Humanities Building opened, allowing for the construction of additional humanities classrooms, as well as expanded music facilities. In addition, the school also offers a Proscenium and a black box theater, a ceramics studio, a sculpture studio, a student art gallery and a digital imaging suite and darkroom. Additional improvements include a 55,000 sq ft (5,100 m²) humanities building added to the Merrell Road campus, a new stadium and new turf field, and improved locker room facilities. The new stadium also features improved accommodations for fans. The school also acquired an outdoor education center in northern Collin County, spanning spans 165 acres (0.67 km²).

In 2010, the school opened its Stephen B. Swann Athletic and Wellness Center. The building houses Dining Commons, physical education facilities, and additional office space. The building, covering over 100,00 sq.ft., also includes two gymnasiums, indoor track, conditioning and workout facilities, a dance studio, a wrestling room, and sports medicine facilities. The building was later modified to expand locker rooms and add a team room and athletic offices. The new dining facilities can seat 480 students, and overlook the school's quarry and Louise Crespi Benners Courtyard. The kitchen also houses a laboratory for instruction from nutritional experts and professional chefs, based on guidelines from the Center for Human Nutrition at The University of Texas Southwest Medical Center. There's also a greenhouse and chicken coop outside by the quarry.

With the opening of a new lower-school facility in 2020, ESD became a unified community once more. Planning for the new building began in 2015 and the structure was completed in 2020. The multi-story facility contains over 60,000 sq ft of space. In September 2020, the structure won the "Best Project in K-12 Education by Engineering News-Record" award, beating out other structures in Mississippi, Arkansas, Louisiana, Oklahoma, and Texas.

== Demographics ==
ESD has an enrollment of slightly more than 1,100 students and more than 200 faculty and staff members. They have a student-faculty ratio of 7:1. The student population contains a plurality of Episcopalian (30%) and majority Caucasian students (82%). The school also provides tuition assistance to students through grants. There are 43 AP courses offered and 73 different zip codes represented in the student body.

== Controversies ==
In 2012, the school was found guilty of fraud and negligent behavior for mishandling a 2009 statutory rape. A 34-year-old teacher sexually assaulted a 16-year-old student, using a school-owned vehicle, and a school credit card to rent a hotel room. The teacher pleaded guilty in criminal court. Administrators forced the victim to withdraw upon hearing about their relations. The student's parents pressed civil charges against ESD and were awarded $9 million for punitive and compensatory damages from the withdrawal.

In 2013, the son of new Headmistress Meredyth Moredock Cole was caught throwing an underage drinking party at her house. According to D Magazine, ESD is "not a zero-tolerance school". The children involved received detention or were required to do community service.

== Notable alumni ==
- Barrett Brown - Journalist, essayist, involved with Anonymous
- Gray Malin - Photographer
- Drew Moor - Professional soccer player for the Colorado Rapids
- Phil Pressey - Professional basketball player for the Boston Celtics
- Charlotte North - Professional lacrosse player for the Boston Guard
