= Sydney Scales =

Professional Lacrosse Player

Sydney Scales (born October 21, 2001) is an American lacrosse player. She played NCAA Division I women's lacrosse at Boston College. Scales has since gone on to play professionally and launch a business called "Sydney Scales Lacrosse", focused on the performance and development of young athletes in the sport. She also currently serves as an assistant coach for the Harvard Crimson women's lacrosse team.

== Early life, education and career ==
Scales was raised in Walpole, Massachusetts, playing field hockey, basketball, and lacrosse at Walpole High School. Her high school career included multiple conference and division awards in all three sports.

=== College career ===
Scales attended Boston College, where she played between 2021 and 2024. During her time with the Eagles, she was a four-year contributor and team captain. She helped lead Boston College to four consecutive NCAA Championship Weekend appearances and two national championships.

Individual accolades:

- IWLCA National Defender of the Year (2024)
- First-Team IWLCA All-American (2024)
- Two-Time ACC Defender of the Year (2023-2024)
- Four-Time All-ACC Academic Team member (2021-2024)
- ACC Women’s Lacrosse Scholar-Athlete of the Year (2024)

Scales finished her career with 111 caused turnovers and 142 ground balls, fifth all-time in program history.

== Professional career ==
In May 2024, Scales was drafted into Athletes Unlimited Pro Lacrosse.

In 2025, Scales earned a spot on the U.S. Women’s National Team roster for the Pan-American Lacrosse Association (PALA) Women's Championship in Auburndale, Florida. USA defeated Canada in the Championship Game 21-11.

=== Coaching career ===
In July 2024, Scales was named an assistant coach for the Harvard Crimson women's lacrosse team, under head coach Devon Wills.

=== Entrepreneurial work and athlete development ===
In 2025, Scales launched a business, Sydney Scales Lacrosse, focused on the holistic development of young lacrosse players. The business primarily serves players in 2nd–12th grade.
