= Kenzie Kent =

American ice hockey & lacrosse player

- Born: March 13, 1996 (age 30) Norwell, Massachusetts, U.S.
- Height: 168 cm (5 ft 6 in)
- Position: Forward
- Shoots: Left
- Played for: Boston College Eagles
Medal record
Representing United States
Lacrosse sixes
World Games
| Gold medal – first place | 2025 Chengdu | Team |

Kenzie Kent (born March 13, 1996) is an American lacrosse attacker and ice hockey forward. She was drafted 4th overall by the Boston Pride in the 2017 NWHL Draft.

== Career ==
=== Ice Hockey ===
Across 157 games in the NCAA, Kent put up 138 points.

=== Lacrosse ===
She was a three-time U.S. Lacrosse high school All-American. She went on to play 53 games for Boston College, getting 255 points. She won the 2017 ACC Athlete of the Year. In her final year, she served as team captain and was named an All-ACC First Team selection. After graduating, she joined the coaching staff of the Harvard Crimson.

=== International ===
Kent played for USA Hockey at the 2013 IIHF World Women's U18 Championship and 2014 IIHF World Women's U18 Championship, winning two silver medals.
