= Izzy Scane =

American lacrosse player

Personal information
- Height: 5 ft 7 in (170 cm)

Sport
- Position: Midfield / attack
- NCAA team: Northwestern Wildcats (2019–2024)
- WLL team: New York Charging
Medal record
Representing United States
Lacrosse sixes
World Games
| Gold medal – first place | 2025 Chengdu | Team |
Lacrosse
Under-19 World Lacrosse Championships
| Gold medal – first place | 2019 Peterborough | Team |

Isabelle Rae Scane is an American professional lacrosse player for the New York Charging of the Women's Lacrosse League (WLL). She played college lacrosse for the Northwestern Wildcats. She won the 2023 NCAA championship with Northwestern and twice received the Tewaaraton Award as the best player in the country. She broke the all-time NCAA Division I goals record in 2024.

== Early life ==
Scane was raised in Clarkston, Michigan, the daughter of Joseph and Patricia Scane, and has three brothers. Her parents met at Grand Valley State University, where her father wrestled and her mother ran track. She started playing lacrosse in sixth grade after previously competing in gymnastics. She played club lacrosse for the Detroit Lacrosse Club and then Boston-based Mass Elite. She played 4 years and captained the varsity team at Cranbrook Kingswood High School, having two state runner ups and winning two state championships. She set the Michigan all-time high school points record, twice receiving All-American recognition.

== College career ==
Scane started out in 2019 as a defender for the Northwestern Wildcats but was converted to attack after seven games. She was second on the team with 62 goals and 80 points, receiving Big Ten Conference Freshman of the Year honors. She was leading the team in goals as a sophomore when the season was suspended due to the COVID-19 pandemic. As a junior in 2021, she led the nation with 98 goals, receiving Big Ten Attacker of the Year and first-team All-American honors. She was named one of the five Tewaaraton finalists and broke the NCAA single-season record for goals per game, averaging 6.12 goals per game over Northwestern's 16-game season. She missed the 2022 season after tearing her right ACL, meniscus, and LCL during a scrimmage in November 2021.

Scane led the nation with 99 goals when she returned and recorded a career-high 35 assists, receiving the Tewaaraton Award and the Honda Sports Award as the country's best college lacrosse player. She led Northwestern to their first NCAA championship since 2012, becoming the most valuable player of the 2023 NCAA tournament. During her final season in 2024, she passed Hannah Nielsen's program career points record of 398 and broke Charlotte North's NCAA Division I career goals record of 358. Scane ended the 2024 season with 88 goals, leading the nation, while also adding 21 assists. After the season, she once again won the Tewaaraton Award, making her the 6th women's player to ever win the award back-to-back. Scane additionally repeated in winning the Honda Sports Award. Over her six-year NCAA career, Scane finished with 376 goals and 483 points in 84 games.

During her time at Northwestern she graduated with a degree in Communication Sciences and Disorders. During Scanes 5th and 6th year, she got a certificate in Business Essentials and a masters in Management through the Kellogg School of Management.

== International career ==
Scane tried out for the United States national under-19 team in 2018 but was cut by her future Northwestern coach Kelly Amonte Hiller. Following her freshman season, she was called up to play at the Under-19 World Lacrosse Championships in 2019, scoring three goals to help beat Canada in the final and being named player of the match. She led the team with 21 goals (tied with Caitlyn Wurzburger) and was one of five Americans named to the All-World team.
