= Martinsville, New Jersey =

Populated place in Somerset County, New Jersey, US

- Census-designated place
- Former Martinsville School

- Location in Somerset County Location in New Jersey Location in the United States
- Coordinates: 40.602946°N 74.575794°W
- Country: United States
- State: New Jersey
- County: Somerset
- Township: Bridgewater

Area
  - Total: 12.23 sq mi (31.67 km^{2})
  - Land: 12.15 sq mi (31.47 km^{2})
  - Water: 0.073 sq mi (0.19 km^{2}) 0.62%
- Elevation: 259 ft (79 m)

Population (2020)
  - Total: 12,147
  - Density: 999.6/sq mi (385.9/km^{2})
- Time zone: UTC−05:00 (Eastern (EST))
  - Summer (DST): UTC−04:00 (Eastern (EDT))
- ZIP Code: 08836
- Area code: 908
- FIPS code: 34-44430
- GNIS feature ID: 02584010

Martinsville is an unincorporated community and census-designated place (CDP) located within Bridgewater Township in Somerset County, in the U.S. state of New Jersey. As of the 2020 census, Martinsville had a population of 12,147.

Martinsville is located in northeastern Bridgewater near Warren Township; the 08836 ZIP Code also takes in the southern extension of Bernards Township. It is an affluent, predominantly residential area, though it does have its own commercial center along Washington Valley Road, and its own post office.

== History ==
The Middlebrook encampment was a seasonal encampment of the Continental Army during the American Revolutionary War near Martinsville that straddled the ridge of the First Watchung Mountains. Its position provided a natural fortress not only protecting the Continental Army, but also overlooking the plains towards New Brunswick where the British forces were stationed in 1777.

Tradition holds that it was at the Middlebrook encampment that the first official flag of the United States was unfurled, after a law to adopt a national flag had been passed by Congress on June 14, 1777. By special order of Congress, a Thirteen Star Flag is flown 24 hours a day at the Washington Camp Ground, part of the former Middlebrook encampment, in Bridgewater. Since 1889, the first hoisting of the flag is commemorated annually each July 4 with a changing of the flag, a reading of the United States Declaration of Independence, and the delivery of an historical address.

== Geography ==
According to the United States Census Bureau, Martinsville had a total area of 12.398 square miles (32.111 km^{2}), including 12.322 square miles (31.914 km^{2}) of land and 0.076 square miles (0.198 km^{2}) of water (0.62%).

== Demographics ==
Historical population
Census	Pop.	Note	%±
2010	11,980		—
2020	12,147		1.4%
U.S. Decennial Census; 2010 2020

Martinsville first appeared as a census designated place in the 2010 U.S. census.

=== Racial and ethnic composition ===
Martinsville CDP, New Jersey – Racial and ethnic composition Note: the US Census treats Hispanic/Latino as an ethnic category. This table excludes Latinos from the racial categories and assigns them to a separate category. Hispanics/Latinos may be of any race.
Race / Ethnicity (NH = Non-Hispanic)	Pop 2010	Pop 2020	% 2010	% 2020
White alone (NH)	10,206	9,092	85.19%	74.85%
Black or African American alone (NH)	147	217	1.23%	1.79%
Native American or Alaska Native alone (NH)	5	4	0.04%	0.03%
Asian alone (NH)	980	1,565	8.18%	12.88%
Native Hawaiian or Pacific Islander alone (NH)	0	3	0.00%	0.02%
Other race alone (NH)	20	40	0.17%	0.33%
Mixed race or Multiracial (NH)	165	379	1.38%	3.12%
Hispanic or Latino (any race)	457	847	3.81%	6.97%
Total	11,980	12,147	100.00%	100.00%

=== 2020 census ===
As of the 2020 census, Martinsville had a population of 12,147. The median age was 46.6 years. 20.8% of residents were under the age of 18 and 20.7% of residents were 65 years of age or older. For every 100 females there were 97.4 males, and for every 100 females age 18 and over there were 94.4 males age 18 and over.

100.0% of residents lived in urban areas, while 0.0% lived in rural areas.

There were 4,299 households in Martinsville, of which 33.9% had children under the age of 18 living in them. Of all households, 71.3% were married-couple households, 8.6% were households with a male householder and no spouse or partner present, and 17.4% were households with a female householder and no spouse or partner present. About 16.3% of all households were made up of individuals and 11.2% had someone living alone who was 65 years of age or older.

There were 4,441 housing units, of which 3.2% were vacant. The homeowner vacancy rate was 1.0% and the rental vacancy rate was 7.5%.

=== 2010 census ===
The 2010 United States census counted 11,980 people, 4,331 households, and 3,491 families in the CDP. The population density was 972.3 per square mile (375.4/km^{2}). There were 4,461 housing units at an average density of 362.0 per square mile (139.8/km^{2}). The racial makeup was 88.45% (10,596) White, 1.31% (157) Black or African American, 0.04% (5) Native American, 8.20% (982) Asian, 0.00% (0) Pacific Islander, 0.42% (50) from other races, and 1.59% (190) from two or more races. Hispanic or Latino of any race were 3.81% (457) of the population.

Of the 4,331 households, 36.2% had children under the age of 18; 71.7% were married couples living together; 6.4% had a female householder with no husband present and 19.4% were non-families. Of all households, 16.6% were made up of individuals and 10.0% had someone living alone who was 65 years of age or older. The average household size was 2.75 and the average family size was 3.10.

24.4% of the population were under the age of 18, 5.8% from 18 to 24, 18.2% from 25 to 44, 35.2% from 45 to 64, and 16.5% who were 65 years of age or older. The median age was 45.9 years. For every 100 females, the population had 95.2 males. For every 100 females ages 18 and older there were 92.4 males.

== Points of interest ==
- Washington Valley Park, part of the Somerset County Park System, is located in Martinsville. The park offers extensive hiking and mountain biking opportunities. A notable hike in the park is an hour-long hike around the out-of-use reservoir that once served Bound Brook, New Jersey.
- Devil's Tree is a solitary oak located in a field on Mountain Road. Legend has it that it is the property of the Devil and a gateway to Hell.
- There is a Revolutionary War cemetery in the Spring Run section of Martinsville, where soldiers of both American and British troops are buried, along with some early settlers of the area.

== Education ==
The Pingry School's upper division for grades 6 to 12 is located in Martinsville.

Little Friends of Jesus Nursery School (preschool, non-parochial) operate under the supervision of Roman Catholic Diocese of Metuchen.

== Notable people ==
People who were born in, residents of, or otherwise closely associated with Martinsville include:

- Catherine Caro (born 1995), field hockey player
- Andrea Kane, author of romance novels
- Geraldine Laybourne (born 1947), founded Oxygen Media and has served as its chairman and chief executive officer since its inception
- Ally Mastroianni, professional lacrosse player for the California Palms of the Women's Lacrosse League
- Mark Oldman (born 1969), entrepreneur, wine expert and author
- Upton Sinclair (1878-1968), author of The Jungle lived in Martinsville during the later years of his life
