= Gray Malin =

American photographer

- Born: Dallas, TX
- Occupations: fine art photographer, aerial photographer
- Years active: 2009–present
- Website: www.graymalin.com

Gray Malin is a Los Angeles–based American fine-art photographer, aerial photographer, and author. He is known for his photo collections of remote locations, as well as his aerial photographs of various destinations.

== Personal life ==
Malin was born in Dallas, Texas. He attended Emerson College in Boston, Massachusetts, where he majored in marketing and received a minor in photography. He currently lives in West Hollywood. Malin married his husband, Jeff Richardson, in 2012. They welcomed twins, Dove and Max, in 2018.

== Career ==
After graduation, Malin moved to Los Angeles for an internship at Paramount. He started his photography business by selling his photographs at a local market in West Hollywood. In 2009, he gained public attention with his Prada Marfa series. This series was a sequence created with the assistance of the local township in Marfa, Texas. One of his books, Beaches, documented five years of his work, spanning twenty cities over six continents.

Malin has collaborated with notable brands. With Veuve Clicquot, he produced original prints inspired by the brand; with Sperry Top-Sider, he created a spring shoe line featuring his photography; and with Le Méridien, he did the Follow Me Campaign in 2015. The campaign exhibited Malin and his photographs (captured in Palm Springs, Bhutan, and Barcelona) in hotels for public viewing. He did a photoshoot with the Beverly Hills Hotel that captured different areas of the hotel, and redesigned a cabana by the pool that featured photography from the collection. He partnered with Aspen-based hotel The Little Nell to create a series of photographs that pay homage to the ski resort town for their 30th anniversary. He has also partnered with Janie and Jack, Away Luggage, Disney, The Parker Hotel, and Bugaboo.

Malin did a project with winery Nocking Point to launch Getaway Rose, a line of rosé wine. His Far Far Away series is notable for photographs of Salar De Uyuni using mirrors. Malin has also manually taken aerial photographs of beaches from around the world.

== Books ==
Malin is the author of various books.

- Beaches (NYT Bestseller) – ISBN 9781419720895
- Escape – ISBN 9781419727597
- Italy – ISBN 9781419735974
- A World of Opposites – ISBN 9781419739705
- Be Our Guest – ISBN 9781419729300
