= Ally Mastroianni =

American lacrosse player

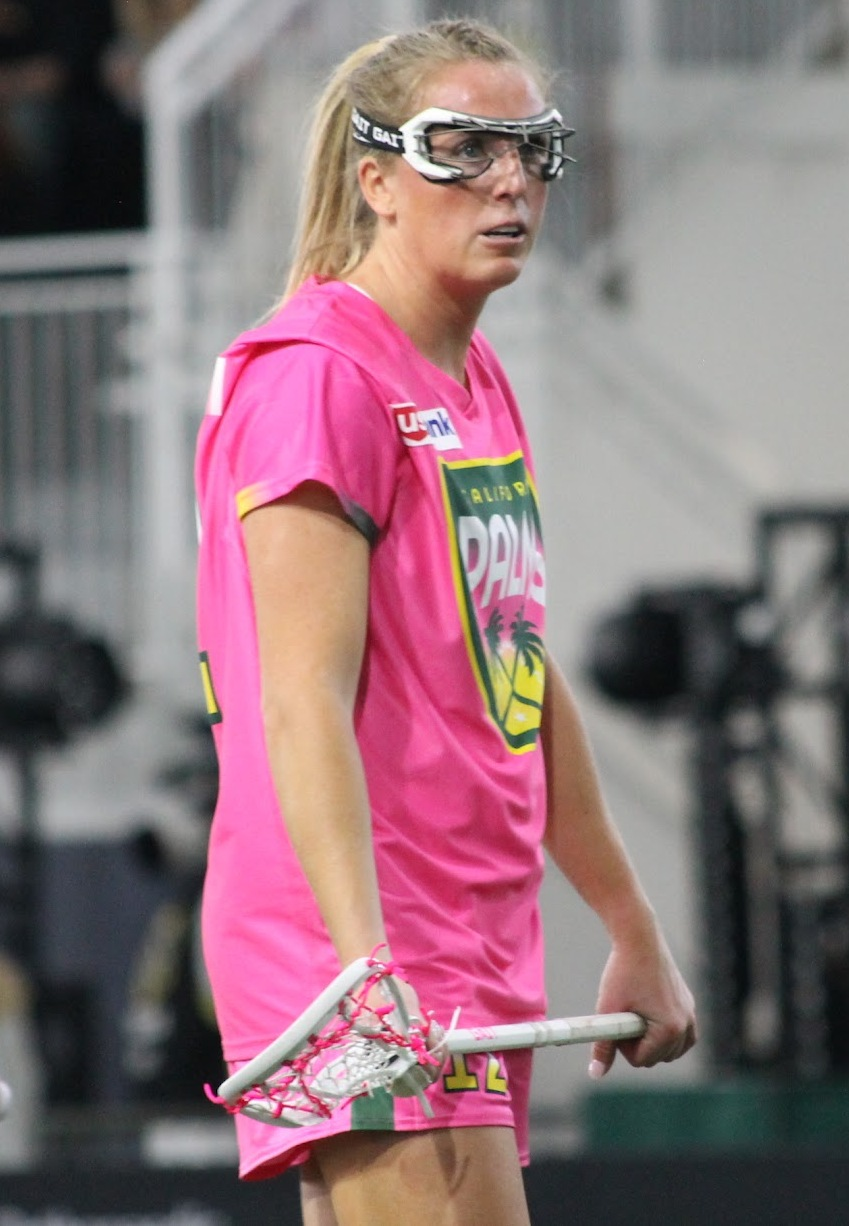
- Mastroianni in the WLL Championship Series in 2026

Personal information
- Height: 5 ft 9 in (175 cm)

Sport
- Position: Midfielder
- NCAA team: North Carolina Tar Heels (2018–2022)
- WLL team: California Palms

Allison Mastroianni is an American professional lacrosse player for the California Palms of the Women's Lacrosse League (WLL). She played college lacrosse for the North Carolina Tar Heels, where she won the 2022 national championship.

Raised in the Martinsville section of Bridgewater Township, New Jersey, Mastroianni played prep lacrosse at Bridgewater-Raritan High School.
