= Alex Aust =

American lacrosse player (born c.1991)

Personal information
- Nationality: USA
- Born: c. 1991 (age 34–35) Sterling, Virginia, U.S.
- Height: 5 ft 9 in (175 cm)

Sport
- Position: Attacker
- Shoots: Left/Right
- NCAA team: Maryland Terrapins (2009–2013)
- WLL team: Maryland Charm
- Pro career: 2009–

Alex Aust Holman is an American women's lacrosse player for the Maryland Charm of the Women's Lacrosse League. She played with the Maryland Terrapins at the collegiate level from 2010 to 2013. In 2013, she was the National Attacker of the Year and a Tewaaraton Award finalist. Aust Holman was named to the US national team in 2014 and won the gold medal in the 2017 World Cup. She is currently still an active member, wearing jersey number 10. In 2016, she was selected by the Baltimore Ride with their second pick and fifth overall in the inaugural United Women's Lacrosse League Draft. She then went on to play for Athletes Unlimited Pro Lacrosse from 2021 to 2023, before joining the Maryland Charm for their inaugural season in 2024 as their first announced player.

== Playing career ==
=== High school ===
Aust Holman attended Bullis School in Potomac, Maryland from 2005 to 2009. During her time there, she was a three-sport standout athlete in field hockey, lacrosse and basketball. As a junior, Aust Holman was first team All-American selection and competed with the club team known as the Capital Lacrosse Club. In addition to this, she earned the accolades of All-ISL first team, All-MET honorable mention, all-county, and All-Gazette first team honors. As a senior, Aust Holman was named All-Gazette in both field hockey and basketball as well as being recognized as All-ISL, All-Met second team, All-Gazette, Under Armour All-American and squad MVP in lacrosse. Aust Holman was debating between playing basketball or lacrosse at the collegiate level, but ultimately decided to play lacrosse under Cathy Reese at the University of Maryland.

=== NCAA ===
In every one of her four seasons with the Terrapins, the program boasted an Atlantic Coast Conference (ACC) championship. As a freshman in 2010, she was a member of the NCAA national championship team. During the 2012 ACC tournament, she set a tournament record for most assists (13) and points (17). She set a career-high for most goals in one game with five, achieving the feat against Virginia on March 1, 2013. As a side note, her younger sister Nicole was a teammate for two seasons.

Aust Holman graduated from Maryland with 132 career assists, third-best in program history. In addition, she logged 275 points, which placed her sixth all-time among Terrapins female lacrosse players. After graduation, she returned to the Terrapins as the Director of Operations with the Maryland women's lacrosse program.

=== UWLX ===
Aust Holman played in the first game in Baltimore Ride history, but did not register a point. In the Ride's second game, a 17–16 loss to the Boston Storm, Aust Holman set a league and team record for most goals in a game. She would score a hat trick in the first and second half of the game, logging six goals overall.

=== Athletes Unlimited Pro Lacrosse ===
Aust Holman played in the Athletes Unlimited Pro Lacrosse league from 2021 to 2023. She had 49 total points and a 43% scoring average for the three years.

=== Maryland Charm ===
Alex Aust Holman was the first player named to the Maryland Charm for the Women's Lacrosse League 2025 inaugural season. She played in the first ever game against the New York Charging in February 2025. The Charm lost that game and the next one against the Boston Guard. They picked up their first ever win against the California Palms on February 15, 2025.

== Coaching career ==
Aust Holman returned to her alma mater as a volunteer assistant coach for Maryland in 2023 before she was named the team's director of player development in 2024 and then elevated to assistant coach the following season.

== Other ==
In 2013, Aust Holman became an Under Armour sponsored athlete. Two years later, Aust Holman was named as the first female spokesperson for the HEADstrong Foundation. In 2014, Aust Holman became the director of Finish Line Lacrosse, an organization dedicated to running lacrosse camps and clinics for young female lacrosse players all over the United States. In addition, she helps organize elite recruiting tournaments in order for athletes to gain exposure to collegiate coaches. From 2013 to 2015, she was the Director of Operations for the University of Maryland Women's Lacrosse Team. Aust Holman supports the Give and Go Foundation, a charity designed to grow the game of lacrosse globally which was co-founded by Premier Lacrosse League players Adam Ghitelman and Scott Ratliff. With this charity, she volunteers as a coach and travels across the world to spread the game.

Aust Holman posed for Sports Illustrated Swimsuit in 2021, the first lacrosse player to be featured in the publication.

Aust Holman is represented by Athelo Group, a sports agency based out of Stamford, Connecticut.

== Personal life ==
Aust Holman is married to fellow professional lacrosse player Marcus Holman. She is of Thai descent via her mother, Longma.

== Awards and honors ==
- 2012 ACC championship all-tournament team
- 2012, IWLCA Second Team All-American
- 2012, Second Team All-American
- 2013, Finalist, Tewaaraton Award
- 2013, First Team All-ACC
- 2013, First Team All-American
- 2013 IWLCA National Attacker of the Year
- 2013 Synapse Sport National Attacker of the Year
- 2016 UWLX All-Star Selection
- 2017 Team USA Gold Medalist
