= Charlotte North =

American lacrosse player (born 1993)

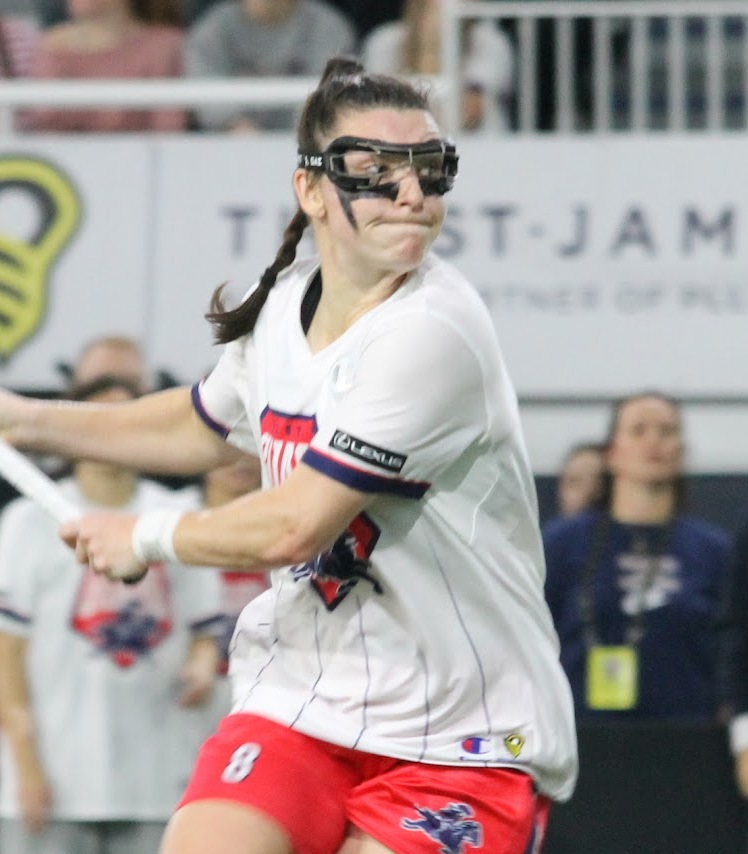
- North in the WLL Championship Series in 2026

Personal information
- Nationality: American
- Born: March 3, 1999 (age 27) Dallas, Texas, U.S.
- Height: 5 ft 7 in (170 cm)

Sport
- Position: Attack
- Shoots: Right
- NCAA team: Duke (2017–2019); Boston College (2019–2022)
- WLL team: Boston Guard

Career highlights
- WLL: Champion (2025); All-Tournament Team (2025); All-Star Captain (2025); AU: 1st Overall Pick in the 2022 Draft; NCAA: NCAA Division I Tournament Champion (2021); NCAA Division I Tournament Runner-up (2022); 2x Tewaaraton Award winner (2021, 2022); 2x Mary Garber ACC Female Athlete of the Year (2021, 2022); 2x IWLCA Player of the Year (2021, 2022); 2x IWLCA Attacker of the Year (2021, 2022); 2x ACC Scholar-Athlete of the Year (2021, 2022); NCAA Tournament Most Outstanding Player (2021); ILWomen Player of the Year (2021)
Medal record
Representing United States
Women's lacrosse
World Lacrosse Championship
Gold medal – first place	2022 Maryland
World Lacrosse Box Championships
Gold medal – first place	2024 Utica
Women's lacrosse sixes
World Games
Gold medal – first place	2025 Chengdu	Team

Charlotte North (born March 3, 1999) is an American lacrosse player for the Boston Guard of the Women's Lacrosse League. She formerly played on the Duke Blue Devils and Boston College Eagles, where she became a two-time Tewaaraton Award winner.

== Early years ==
Charlotte North was born and raised in Dallas, Texas, by Kerry and Paula North. She participated in a variety of sports as a child, with a concentration on basketball. She started playing lacrosse in seventh grade, and in high school it became her main focus.

At the Episcopal School of Dallas, North scored 372 goals on her varsity lacrosse team. She holds the school scoring records for both basketball and lacrosse. She was a two-time US Lacrosse All-American, and the 2017 Under Armor All-American game MVP.

== College career ==
=== Duke (2017–2019) ===
North began her college career at Duke University. As a freshman she led the team in goals, points, game winning goals, free-position goals, and shots on goal. She was named to the Second Team All-ACC and the Tewaaraton Award Watch List.

Her sophomore campaign once again saw North lead the team in goals, points, assists, free-position goals, and shots on goal. She scored 82 goals and 23 assists to tally a 105-point season, beating the former point record held by Tewaaraton winner Katie Chrest. She became the fastest player in program history to reach 100 goals, and scored 11 points in one game to set a new program single-game points record. For the second year in a row, she was named to the Second Team All-ACC and the Tewaaraton Award Watch List.

=== Boston College (2019–2022) ===
Following the 2019 season, North transferred to Boston College. She led the team in goals, assists, and points in a season cut short due to the COVID-19 pandemic. She also set a program single-game record for points, recording 12 points on eight goals and four assists against Boston University.

In 2021, North led the team with 102 goals and 114 points. She was second in the country in points and third in draw controls, with her 174 draw controls putting her at second in program history. She set a new NCAA tournament record with 31 goals, and tied the NCAA Championship game record with six goals against Syracuse en route to Boston College's first national championship. She was a consensus first team All-American, ACC Female Athlete of the Year, IWLCA Player of the Year, and the Tewaaraton Award winner.

North continued with Boston College as a graduate student for the 2022 season, where she again led the team in goals, points, shots, and draw controls. North was a consensus first team All-American and the ACC Female Athlete of the Year for the second year, and she earned an ESPY nomination for the Best Female College Athlete. She won the Tewaaraton Award again, becoming only the fifth woman to win it twice.

North held the Division I record for women's lacrosse goals with 358 goals, until the record was broken by Izzy Scane in 2024.

== Professional career ==
=== Team USA ===
Charlotte North debuted with Team USA in 2022, where she won a gold medal at the 2022 World Lacrosse Championship. She led the team with 23 goals, and was tied for second on the team with 28 points. She also won gold at the 2024 World Lacrosse Box Championships, where she led the team with 25 goals. North is on the USA roster for the 2025 Pan-American Championship and the 2025 World Games.

=== Athletes Unlimited ===
North was chosen first in the 2022 Athletes Unlimited draft. She led the league in goals, two-point goals and points over each of the three seasons that she played.

=== Women's Lacrosse League ===
North captained the Boston Guard in the Women's Lacrosse League in 2025, a professional league created by the Premier Lacrosse League. North scored 4 goals and 5 points in the championship game, as the Boston Guard went on to win the inaugural championship.

North captained Team North at the 2025 All-Star Weekend. They lost to Team Izzy, 24 to 20. North won the women's fastest shot competition for the second year in a row, with her shot of 95 MPH setting a new record for the fastest women's lacrosse shot.

== Personal life ==
North has been in a relationship with fellow Boston College lacrosse alum Ryan Smith since 2022.
