= Mount Sinai School District =

School district in the U.S. state of New York

Location
- Mount Sinai, Suffolk County, New York; United States

District information
- Type: Public
- Motto: The Best in Learning and Living
- Grades: PK–12
- Superintendent: Dr. Christine Criscione
- Schools: 3
- NCES District ID: 3620040

Students and staff
- Students: 2,124 (2020–2021)
- Teachers: 192.7 (on an FTE basis)
- Staff: 166.5 (on an FTE basis)
- Student–teacher ratio: 11.02:1
- District mascot: Mustangs
- Colors: Red and black

Other information
- District Offices: 118 North Country Road Mount Sinai, NY 11766
- Website: www.mtsinai.k12.ny.us

The Mount Sinai School District is a school district in the Town of Brookhaven in Suffolk County, New York on the North Shore of Long Island. The district serves almost exclusively nearly all of the hamlet Mount Sinai, but also tiny parts of the village of Port Jefferson and the hamlets of Miller Place and Coram.

== History ==
The precursor to the modern school district was a one room school built in 1869, with expansion in 1908. The school served the area for nearly a hundred years, before it finally closed in 1960. Following the original school's closure, the Mount Sinai district was no more and students who previously would have gone to the original school had to go to Port Jefferson for education. In 1965, the district returned with the establishment of a new elementary school. The district is now where it is today after the additions of a middle and high school in 1978 and 1991 respectively. Today, all three of these schools are located on the same campus on North Country Road in Mount Sinai.

== Schools ==
The following is a table of all the schools used by the Mount Sinai Union Free School District.

School name	Type of school	Address	Grades	Principal
Mount Sinai High School	High School	110 North Country Rd Mount Sinai, NY 11766	9-12	Peter Pramataris
Mount Sinai Middle School	Middle School	114 North Country Rd Mount Sinai, NY 11766	5-8	Christopher Elsesser
Mount Sinai Elementary School	Elementary School	118 North Country Rd Mount Sinai, NY 11766	K-4	Rob Catlin

== Student activities ==
Mount Sinai Sinai School District features many clubs, both nationally recognized and independent, as well as sports. Students throughout the district have the opportunity to join respective clubs in each school, and students in the Middle and High Schools can try out for sports teams. The clubs range anywhere from music and the arts, honor societies, to clubs at the High School NHS, FBLA, STEM, Model United Nations, or Best Buddies. Mount Sinai High School offers sports across three seasons: Fall, Winter, and Spring. Mount Sinai Middle School offers sports in four seasons: Fall, Early Winter, Late Winter, and Spring.

== Notable alumni ==
- Joseph Patrick Dwyer, soldier (Class of 1994)
- Greg Marasciulo, professional wrestler (Class of 2005)
- Philip Scholz, author; swimmer and 2008 Paralympian (Class of 2007)
- Julia Smit, swimmer and 2008 Olympian (Class of 2006)
- James Snider, Scholar (class of 2018)
