= Women's Lacrosse League =

Women's lacrosse sixes league in the United States

- Upcoming season or competition: 2026 Women's Lacrosse League season
- Sport: Lacrosse sixes
- First season: 2025
- Owner: Premier Lacrosse League
- No. of teams: 4
- Country: United States
- Broadcaster: ESPN
- Website: https://thewll.com/

The Women's Lacrosse League (WLL; sponsor name Maybelline Women's Lacrosse League) is a professional lacrosse sixes league owned and organized by the Premier Lacrosse League (PLL). It is the sole professional lacrosse league for women in the United States. The WLL commenced play in 2025, with four clubs competing. Its matches are broadcast domestically by ESPN.

== History ==
Prior to Athletes Unlimited Pro Lacrosse, two attempts at establishing a professional league for traditional women's lacrosse were made – the United Women's Lacrosse League (UWLX), and the Women's Professional Lacrosse League (WPLL). The UWLX was established by United Women's Sports in 2016, and played three seasons before quietly disbanding. Under the leadership of former UWLX Commissioner Michele DeJuliis, the WPLL played two seasons in 2018 and 2019, before its 2020 season was cancelled due to the COVID-19 pandemic in the United States, and collapsed as a result. A number of players in the WPLL would be offered contracts to play in Athletes Unlimited's non-traditional, individualized league, which commenced play in 2021.

By the 2020s, Premier Lacrosse League (PLL) executives were motivated to take advantage of both a growth in demand for women's sports in the U.S., and the timing of the 2028 Summer Olympics in Los Angeles, where discretionary lacrosse sixes tournaments will be contested. The PLL established its "Unleashed" program in 2020, aimed at fostering women's participation in lacrosse through training camps and exhibition games, including the first Unleashed All-Star Game during the 2024 PLL Championship Series. The establishment of the Women's Lacrosse League was announced by PLL President Paul Rabil on the November 13, 2024 broadcast of Get Up on ESPN. U.S. national team players Lizzie Colson, Ally Mastroianni, and Charlotte North, former Northwestern Wildcats midfielder Izzy Scane, and Athletes Unlimited assistant coach Alex Aust Holman, were also simultaneously unveiled as the league's first five signings. All but Colson were later appointed captains of each of the four charter clubs: the Boston Guard, California Palms, Maryland Charm, and New York Charging – the brandings of which were unveiled on a December 10 broadcast of ESPN's SportsCenter. In the same month, Athletes Unlimited announced the suspension of its lacrosse activities, leaving the WLL as the sole professional lacrosse league for women.

== Format and rules ==
The lacrosse sixes format is used for games in the Women's Lacrosse League, which feature six-on-six teams, smaller fields, and shorter time periods than women's lacrosse. There are no specialized roles in sixes, and thus no qualifying designations for attackers and defenders. Sixes also features thirty-second shot clocks and quick restarts initiated by the goaltender. The league's season begins with the annual WLL Championship Series, which takes place concurrently with the PLL Championship Series in February. The format of the league's full season is yet to be determined, though a series of tournaments similar to the WLL Championship Series held throughout the year is being considered.

== Organization ==
The Women's Lacrosse League is a wholly owned subsidiary of the Premier Lacrosse League. Courtney Ellis serves as the league's operations director through her role as the PLL's director of women's growth, while Rachel DeCecco serves as its sporting director through her role as the PLL's vice president of lacrosse.

== Teams ==
The Women's Lacrosse League consists of four clubs: the Boston Guard, captained by Charlotte North; the California Palms, captained by Ally Mastroianni; the Maryland Charm, captained by Alex Aust Holman; and the New York Charging, captained by Izzy Scane. The league chose the markets for their four charter franchises based on local television viewership for lacrosse, the size of the local fandom for women's lacrosse, and the success of the PLL clubs that share the markets. Official home grounds for the four teams are yet to be determined.

2025 Women's Lacrosse League teams
Team	Location	Joined
Boston Guard	Boston, MA	2025
California Palms	California	2025
Maryland Charm	Maryland	2025
New York Charging	New York	2025

== Results ==
Women's Lacrosse League Champions
Tournament	Location	Date	(gold) Champion	(silver) Runner-up
2025 WLL Championship Series	Springfield, VA	February 11–17	Boston Guard	New York Charging
2026 WLL Championship Series	Springfield, VA	February 27 - March 8	New York Charging	California Palms
2026 WLL League Season	Philadelphia, PA	May 16 - August 15	Maryland Charm	California Palms

== Broadcasting and sponsorship ==
ESPN hold the domestic broadcasting rights to the Women's Lacrosse League in the United States, airing some matches on its ESPN2 channel, while also livestreaming all the league's matches on ESPN+. The league's primary sponsors are Lexus and Whirlpool, while Maybelline holds the naming rights to the league and the WLL Championship Series, as the "Maybelline Women's Lacrosse League" and "Maybelline Championship Series", respectively.

== See also ==
- Lacrosse in the United States
- Professional sports leagues in the United States
