= Lacrosse sixes =

Variant of lacrosse

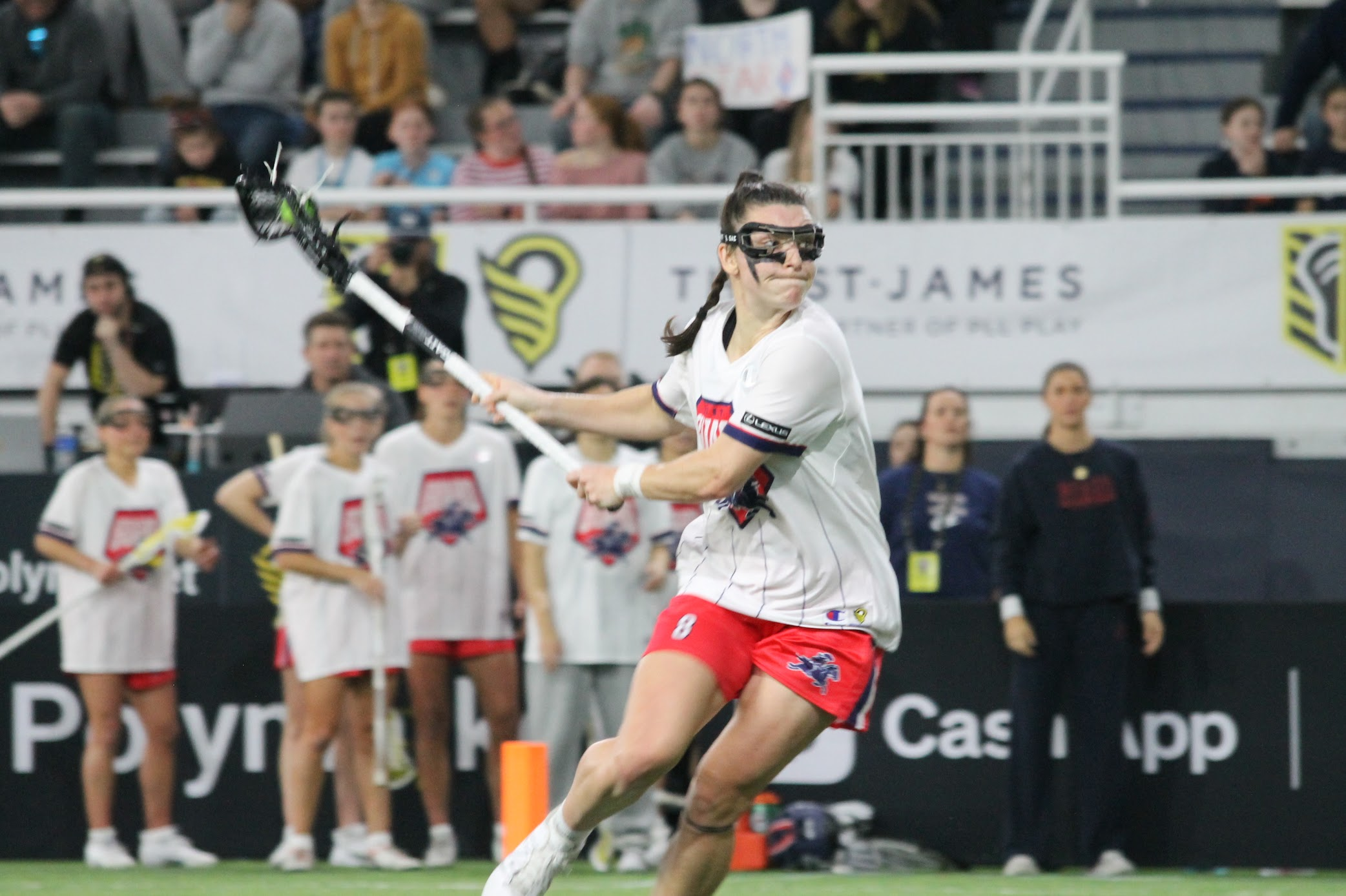
- Highest governing body: World Lacrosse
- First played: 2021

Characteristics
- Team members: 6 per team, including goaltender
- Type: Outdoor
- Venue: 70x36m lacrosse field

Presence
- Olympic: 2028 Summer Olympics

== Development of Sixes ==
Lacrosse sixes (also known as World Lacrosse Sixes) is a version of lacrosse played outdoors with six players on each side. The game follows similar rules to traditional field lacrosse, with modifications and a shorter game time, and is considered to be more fast-paced. Sixes has been described as a hybrid discipline of field and box lacrosse as well as a different sport entirely.

Sixes Lacrosse was officially created in 2021 by World Lacrosse, the global governing body for lacrosse, in a bid to achieve lacrosse's participation in the Olympic Games. In 2022, the sport was shortlisted for possible inclusion and was evaluated for its potential play in the next Olympic Games. The International Olympic Committee approved its inclusion on October 16, 2023, with both men and women competition to be played in sixes format. It will make its Olympic debut in 2028. While past Olympic games featured a maximum of three competing teams, LA 28 will feature 6 men's and 6 women teams. These countries teams will be selected from previous tournament placement involving over 100 teams.

== History ==
Lacrosse sixes began development by the World Lacrosse General Assembly in 2018. The Blue Skies Working Group, chaired by the World Lacrosse vice president Steve Stenersen, began developing the sixes format. Over the next two years lacrosse sixes were played by coaches, players, and more to ensure all the rules were good and appropriate for the unique style of gameplay. The General Assembly approved the first set of official playing rules on November 15, 2020.

On May 18, 2021, World Lacrosse announced a version of field lacrosse that would be formally known as "World Lacrosse Sixes". Sixes was developed in order to reduce barriers to entry for lacrosse (such as cost, field size, player count), and to fit within the framework of future Olympic participation. The game was also designed to reduce special positions like d-pole and allow more countries to be able to participate. World Lacrosse has also stated that the format would provide more parity in international lacrosse.

Lacrosse has faced difficulties with being consistently played in the Olympics for many reasons. Olympic committees often pick sports based on a sports worldwide participation, hosting cost, and venue requirements. Historically lacrosse faced challenges in these areas with the sport being dominantly played in North America, with less interest in other countries. Furthermore, lacrosse fields were expensive to set up and manage with teams struggling to fill out a roster of 20 players. This made Olympic committees look to other sports to be played in summer games. Lacrosse Sixes was developed to solve these various difficulties with smaller teams, shorter fields, and according to World Lacrosse a more exciting games.

The format's first use at a major international sporting event came at the 2022 World Games in Birmingham, Alabama.

The first showcase of the games in an Olympic setting took place in 1904, Saint Louis. The sports made other appearances in Olympic Games include 1908, in London. Followed by being featured as a demonstration sport in Amsterdam 1928, Los Angeles 1932, and London 1948. World Lacrosse received provisional recognition in 2018 and full recognition in 2021. In 2023, lacrosse sixes was added to the program of the 2028 Summer Olympics in Los Angeles, marking the first time any variety of lacrosse has been a medal event since 1908.

Lacrosse popularity has also grown within the last two decades with the number of World Lacrosse member national members has doubled from 45 to 90. The sport is also officially played on five continents with four different continents represented in the top 10 world rankings. With 2.5 million players in the U.S. alone.

Lacrosse sixes' Olympic inclusion parallels that of rugby sevens and 3x3 basketball, also smaller-scale versions of established sports.

In 2026, the first world championship events in lacrosse sixes will be held for both men and women. World Lacrosse has also announced plans for an annual Sixes World Series held across different continents.

Beginning in 2023, the Premier Lacrosse League has run a lacrosse sixes event known as the Championship Series.

Women's Lacrosse League is a professional women's league that will play lacrosse sixes beginning in 2025.

Major League Sixes is an annual competition in Australia.

== Rules ==
Lacrosse sixes has similar rules for men and women but preserves some minor differences, such as the amount of contact allowed.

The major rule differences as compared to traditional field lacrosse are as follows:

- Each team must have six players on the field with five midfielders and one goalie.
- Each game will be overseen by three referees, with one designated as the head referee.
- The field of play is smaller, at 70 meters by 36 meters.
- Face-offs only occur at the beginning of each quarter and overtime: play is restarted after goals with the goalie taking the ball out of the net.
- There is a 30-second shot clock.
- That timer will reset if the ball is possessed by the opposing team or bounces of the goalie.
- Calling a timeout does not reset the shot clock.
- Games are played with four eight-minute quarters, plus multiple three-minute sudden death periods if a tie remains after regulation.
- There is a 15-minute halftime intermission.
- Rosters consist of 12 players.
- Everyone plays both offense and defense.
- There are no long crosses.
- The size of each goal is 1.83 meters high and 1.83 meters wide, positioned 25 meters from the midline.
- Each goal with be orange, with white netting and oriented in a rectangular face.
- When a team gains possession in it defensive half, it must advance the ball across the center line within ten seconds.

Lacrosse sixes is viewed as less accessible for defensive field lacrosse players due to the lack of long poles, as well as for face-off specialists.

== International tournaments ==
Lacrosse tournaments

- Asian Lacrosse Games
- PALA Sixes Cup

In multi-sports events

- World Games – since 2022 edition
