= Sachem School District =

School district in the U.S. state of New York

Sachem Central School District

Location
- Towns of Brookhaven, Islip, and Smithtown, Suffolk County, New York; United States

District information
- Type: Public
- Motto: We Are Sachem!
- Grades: K-12
- Established: 1955
- Superintendent: Patricia Trombetta
- Schools: 16

Students and staff
- District mascot: Flaming Arrows
- Colors

Other information
- District Offices: 51 School Street Lake Ronkonkoma, NY 11779
- Website: www.sachem.edu

The Sachem Central School District is the second largest school district by population on Long Island and among the biggest suburban school districts in New York, United States. Founded in 1955, the district now encompasses residents of the census-designated places of Holbrook, Holtsville and Farmingville, as well as some parts of the Incorporated Village of Lake Grove and the CDPs of Lake Ronkonkoma, Ronkonkoma, Coram, Medford, Selden, Centereach, Bohemia, Sayville, and Bayport in Suffolk County.

== Enrollment ==
As of 2015, the Sachem School District has nearly 15,000 students enrolled annually.

== School colors ==
Sachem School District's colors are red, black and gold. Though each school uses the same fight song which starts out with "Here's to Red, Black, and Gold...", since the split in 2004, Sachem High School North has used black and gold while Sachem High School East uses red and gold as its principal colors. Both schools proudly kept the Sachem team name "Sachem Flaming Arrows".

== History ==
=== Early history and consolidation ===
In 1838, the North West school district was founded as the tenth school district of the Town of Islip. The district name was later changed to Holbrook in 1860, and served (as the names suggest) Holbrook in the northwest corner of the Town of Islip. The district was originally on the border of Islip and the towns of Smithtown and Brookhaven, the three towns Sachem serves parts of today. This district served much of what is today known as Ronkonkoma at first, known then as Lakeland. This changed what the Lakeland school district was formed as district #11 of the Town of Islip in 1855. Today this area is served by Connetquot. It also served parts of the modern Central Islip School District, until its forming in 1858. It would eventually merge with the Holtsville district of the time, becoming Union Free in 1924. In 1948, the Gatelot Avenue School opened. In 1955, the modern Sachem district was formed through the centralization with the districts in Lake Ronkonkoma and Farmingville.

=== Early growth ===
Over just 15 years from 1955 to 1970, the district would expand rapidly. Grundy Avenue Elementary, Lynwood Avenue Elementary, and Sachem Junior-Senior High School all opened in 1956. From 1963 to 1970, Nokomis, Hiawatha, Chippewa, Wenonah, Cayuga, Merrimac, Tamarac, and Tecumseh elementary schools, along with Seneca Middle School, all opened. In 1970, Sachem became a dual high school district with the opening of Sachem High School North.

=== Reconfiguration ===
As voted upon by district constituents in 1999, the district built two new schools and reconfigured its current schools at the start of the 2004-2005 school year. The elementary schools, which formerly housed grades Kindergarten through 6th, are now K-5. Seneca and Sagamore junior high schools (formerly grades 7 and 8) became middle schools (grades 6 through 8). The former Sachem High School South, the 9th and 10th-grade facility, was converted into Samoset Middle School. Sequoya was built as a fourth middle school for the purpose of reconfiguration. Sachem High School North, formerly home to all 11th and 12th-grade students in the district became a 9-12 facility for students in the western and northern portions of the district. Sachem East was built as a 9-12 facility for students in the southern and eastern portions of the district. Sachem East is also the second largest suburban high school in New York state.

== District Cuts ==
On September 16, 2015, the Sachem School District Board of Education voted to cut custodial staff, athletics, clubs, and other extracurricular activities in order to reallocate $2.5 million for Special Education services and worker compensation costs. The board declined to cut $345,000 in Kindergarten aides. Changes will affect over 14,000 students across the district.

Three months later, on December 17, Sachem School District announced, due to declining enrollment and a $1.3 million budget gap, that it would close down Sequoya Middle School as well as Tecumseh and Gatelot Elementary Schools.

== WSHR ==
The district has its own radio station, WSHR. It operates on 91.9 FM and is, named after the mascot of the district, known as "The Arrow." It is licensed out of Lake Ronkonkoma. It is a non-profit and does not feature any advertisements. It has a 6,000 watt tower, making it the largest educational radio station in the Northeast United States. It is able to be heard in the Sachem area, as well as most of Suffolk County and also some of Nassau County. The station is run by students at both Sachem East and Sachem North in broadcast journalism classes. Today, the district primarily uses the station for Top 40 and pop music, but also features North or East basketball and football games. For many years beforehand, it was a jazz station.

== Schools ==
=== Elementary schools ===
- Cayuga
- Chippewa
- Gatelot (Closed 2016)
- Grundy
- Hiawatha
- Lynwood
- Merrimac
- Nokomis
- Tamarac
- Tecumseh (Closed 2016)
- Wenonah
- Waverly

=== Middle schools ===
- Sagamore Middle School
- Samoset Middle School
- Seneca Middle School
- Sequoya Middle School (Closed 2016, set to reopen in 2027)

=== High schools ===
- Sachem High School East
- Sachem High School North

=== Unbuilt ===
In addition to the schools mentioned above, a number of schools were once proposed, but never built.

== Board of education ==
As of the 2025-2026 school year, Sachem's school board consists of the following members:

Sachem CSD Board of Education
Board member's name	Position
Vincent Reynolds	President
Robert Scavo	Vice President
Matthew Baumann	Trustee
Michael J. Isernia, Esq.	Trustee
Sabrina Pitkewicz	Trustee
Meredith Volpe	Trustee
Stephanie Volpe	Trustee
Dennis Buckstein	Trustee
Jessica Schreck	Trustee

== Notable alumni ==
- Jon Bellion – singer, songwriter
- Dalton Crossan – former NFL running back for the Indianapolis Colts and the Tampa Bay Buccaneers
- Ryan DeRobertis – (A.K.A. Skylar Spence) electronic musician
- Captain Kirk Douglas – Guitarist and singer
- Jumbo Elliott – professional football player
- Karen Ferguson-Dayes – soccer player
- Neal Heaton – professional baseball player
- Keith Kinkaid – professional ice hockey player
- Maria Michta-Coffey – Olympic race walker
- Jeff Ruland – professional basketball player
- Vince Russo – professional wrestling writer
- Marc Sebastian – fashion model, stylist, and activist
- Douglas M. Smith – New York State Legislator
- Joe Scally – soccer player
