= WSHR =

- Lake Ronkonkoma, New York; United States
- Broadcast area: Long Island
- Frequency: 91.9 MHz
- Branding: 91.9 The Arrow

Programming
- Language: English
- Format: Contemporary hit radio

Ownership
- Owner: Sachem School District; (Sachem Central School District Holbrook)

History
- First air date: 1968; 58 years ago
- Call sign meaning: Sachem High School Radio

Technical information
- Licensing authority: FCC
- Facility ID: 4169
- Class: A
- ERP: 6,000 watts
- HAAT: 54 meters (177 ft)
- Transmitter coordinates: 40°50′08.0″N 73°05′57.4″W

Links
- Public license information: Public file; LMS

WSHR (91.9 FM, "91.9 The Arrow") is a radio station licensed to Lake Ronkonkoma, New York. The station is owned by the Sachem School District and operates with assistance from a grant by the U.S. Department of Education. It broadcasts out of both Sachem High School East and Sachem High School North. This school district owned radio station can be heard throughout central and western Suffolk County and parts of Nassau County. This makes The Arrow the largest educational radio station in the Northeast United States.

On May 28, 2010, WSHR switched formats from a jazz and variety mix to contemporary hit radio as "91.9 The Arrow." However, jazz is still played on Sundays. The station also broadcasts basketball and football games for both Sachem North and Sachem East.
