= Holbrook, New York =

- Hamlet and census-designated place
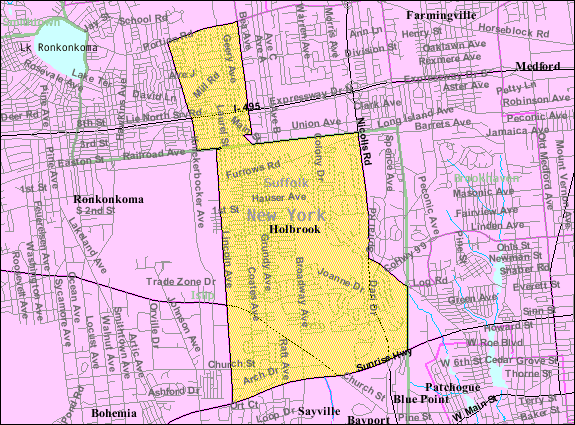
- U.S. Census map of Holbrook

- Location on Long Island Location within the state of New York
- Coordinates: 40°47′59″N 73°4′32″W
- Country: United States
- State: New York
- County: Suffolk
- Town: Brookhaven; Islip

Area
  - Total: 6.88 sq mi (17.83 km^{2})
  - Land: 6.88 sq mi (17.83 km^{2})
  - Water: 0 sq mi (0.00 km^{2})
- Elevation: 118 ft (36 m)

Population (2020)
  - Total: 26,487
  - Density: 3,848.2/sq mi (1,485.81/km^{2})
- Time zone: UTC−05:00 (Eastern Time Zone)
  - Summer (DST): UTC−04:00
- ZIP Code: 11741
- Area codes: 631, 934
- FIPS code: 36-35056
- GNIS feature ID: 0952975

Holbrook is a hamlet and census-designated place (CDP) within the Towns of Brookhaven and Islip, in Suffolk County, New York, United States. The population was 26,487 at the time of the 2020 census. The community borders the eastern side of Long Island MacArthur Airport.

== History ==
Holbrook is believed to have derived its name from a stream which was called, in various narratives, either "Old Brook" or "Hollow Brook."

The area was part of the 51,000 acre Islip Grange estate, acquired in 1697 by William Nicoll (son of Matthias Nicoll, who was the sixth mayor of New York City). It was largely a rural area until Alexander McCotter acquired 5,000 acres in the area in 1848 (after the Long Island Rail Road reached it in 1844) and platted the community. The oldest still standing building from this period is St. John's Lutheran Church, which was built in 1863. In 1875, the Nevins and Griswold cigar factory operated at the original LIRR station.

In 1931 the population was 321. Population increased from 2,500 in 1965 to 15,000 in 1975, after the Long Island Expressway reached the community in 1969. It also was the center of growth as Long Island MacArthur Airport developed along the community's western border.

== Geography ==
According to the United States Census Bureau, the CDP has a total area of 7.2 square miles (18.6 km^{2}), all land.

=== Climate ===
Holbrook has a hot-summer humid continental climate (Dfa) and average monthly temperatures at the Holbrook Country Club range from 30.9 °F in January to 74.0 °F in July. The local hardiness zone is 7a.

== Demographics ==
Historical population
Census	Pop.	Note	%±
2000	27,512		—
2010	27,195		−1.2%
2020	26,487		−2.6%
U.S. Decennial Census

=== 2020 census ===
As of the 2020 census, Holbrook had a population of 26,487. The median age was 43.4 years. 19.7% of residents were under the age of 18 and 18.3% of residents were 65 years of age or older. For every 100 females there were 94.5 males, and for every 100 females age 18 and over there were 92.0 males age 18 and over.

100.0% of residents lived in urban areas, while 0.0% lived in rural areas.

There were 9,439 households in Holbrook, of which 31.6% had children under the age of 18 living in them. Of all households, 57.5% were married-couple households, 13.6% were households with a male householder and no spouse or partner present, and 23.2% were households with a female householder and no spouse or partner present. About 19.9% of all households were made up of individuals and 9.2% had someone living alone who was 65 years of age or older.

There were 9,714 housing units, of which 2.8% were vacant. The homeowner vacancy rate was 0.4% and the rental vacancy rate was 3.2%.

Racial composition as of the 2020 census
Race	Number	Percent
White	21,653	81.7%
Black or African American	757	2.9%
American Indian and Alaska Native	47	0.2%
Asian	1,206	4.6%
Native Hawaiian and Other Pacific Islander	6	0.0%
Some other race	891	3.4%
Two or more races	1,927	7.3%
Hispanic or Latino (of any race)	3,166	12.0%

=== 2010 census ===
As of the census of 2010, there were 27,195 people residing in the CDP.

=== 2000 census ===
As of the census of 2000, there were 27,512 people, 9,019 households, and 7,350 families residing in the CDP. The population density was 4,032.5 inhabitants per square mile (1,557.0/km^{2}). There were 9,157 housing units at an average density of 1,342.2 per square mile (518.2/km^{2}). The racial makeup of the CDP was 89.1% White, 1.32% African American, 0.08% Native American, 2.87% Asian, 0.04% Pacific Islander, 0.69% from other races, and 1.05% from two or more races. Hispanic or Latino of any race were 5.9% of the population.

There were 9,019 households, out of which 39.1% had children under the age of 18 living with them, 68.8% were married couples living together, 9.5% had a female householder with no husband present, and 18.5% were non-families. 14.3% of all households were made up of individuals, and 3.9% had someone living alone who was 65 years of age or older. The average household size was 3.04 and the average family size was 3.38.

In the CDP, the population was spread out, with 25.7% under the age of 18, 8.0% from 18 to 24, 32.5% from 25 to 44, 26.2% from 45 to 64, and 7.5% who were 65 years of age or older. The median age was 35 years. For every 100 females, there were 94.6 males. For every 100 females age 18 and over, there were 91.8 males.

The median income for a household in the CDP was $72,801, and the median income for a family was $76,349 (these figures had risen to $96,530 and $101,336 respectively as of a 2007 estimate. Males had a median income of $80,040 versus $63,651 for females. The per capita income for the CDP was $26,863. About 2.5% of families and 3.3% of the population were below the poverty threshold, including 3.6% of those under age 18 and 3.8% of those age 65 or over.

== Government ==
Holbrook is located mainly within the Town of Islip, while the section between Portion Road and the Long Island Rail Road tracks is in the Town of Brookhaven.

== Education ==
All of Holbrook is within the Sachem Central School District, which is independent of town borders. Three of the district's ten elementary schools are located within the CDP: Grundy Elementary, Nokomis Elementary, and Merrimac Elementary. It is also the location of one of the district's three middle schools: Seneca Middle School.

Holbrook residents attend either Sachem High School North or Sachem High School East, depending on which section of Holbrook they live in. Residents living in the north and west parts of the hamlet go to Sachem High School North in Lake Ronkonkoma, while those living in the south and east parts of the hamlet go to Sachem High School East in Farmingville.

The Sachem Public Library is located in Holbrook.

== Transportation ==
=== Roads ===
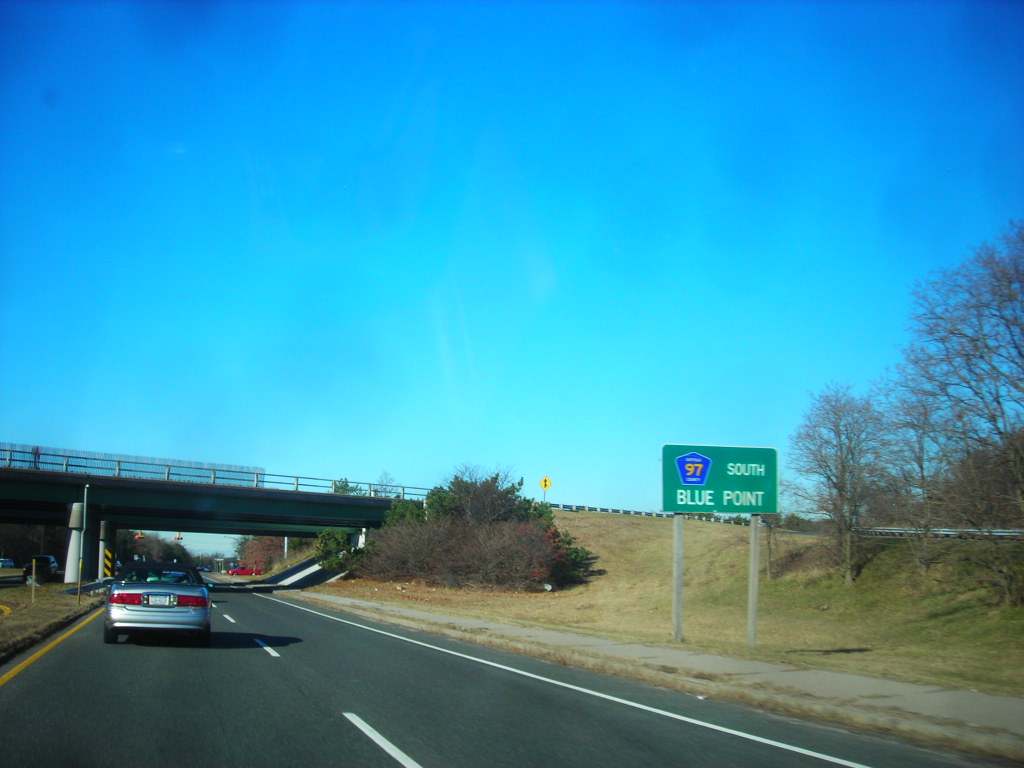
CR 19, within Holbrook, passing beneath Nicolls Road (CR 97)

Roads that pass through Holbrook include:

- I-495 (Long Island Expressway): access from Exit 61.
- New York State Route 454, known as Suffolk County Veterans' Memorial Highway
- New York State Route 27, known as Sunrise POW/MIA Highway, forming the southern border of the CDP. Access from Exit 50 eastbound, exit 51 westbound.
- CR-19, known as Patchogue–Holbrook Road
- CR-18, known as Broadway Avenue (unsigned)
- CR-19A, known as Main Street (unsigned)
- CR-97, known as Nicolls Road, forming part of the eastern border of the CDP
- CR-16, known as Portion Road, forming the northern border of the CDP
- Lincoln Avenue, near the western border of the CDP

=== Buses ===
Bus service in Holbrook is provided by Suffolk County Transit.

=== Train ===
Holbrook is accessible on the Ronkonkoma Branch of the Long Island Rail Road. The Holbrook station closed in 1962, and, as of 2025, the nearest stations to the CDP are Ronkonkoma and Medford.

=== Airport ===
- Long Island MacArthur Airport is approximately 3 miles (5 km) from Holbrook.

== Healthcare ==
The nearest hospital to Holbrook is Long Island Community Hospital in East Patchogue, approximately 7 miles (11 km) southeast of Holbrook.

== Notable person ==
- Christopher Macchio, opera singer
