= Interstate 495 (New York) =

Interstate Highway in New York

Interstate 495
- Map of Long Island with I-495 highlighted in red and service routes in blue

Route information
- Auxiliary route of I-95
- Maintained by NYSDOT, NYCDOT, TBTA, and PANYNJ
- Length: 66.38 mi (106.83 km)
- Existed: 1958–present
- NHS: Entire route
- Restrictions: No hazardous goods in Queens–Midtown Tunnel

Major junctions
- West end: Queens–Midtown Tunnel portal in Murray Hill
- I-278 in Long Island City; I-678 / Grand Central Parkway in Flushing Meadows Park; I-295 in Bayside; Cross Island Parkway in Alley Pond Park; Northern State Parkway in East Hills and Jericho; NY 135 in Syosset; Sagtikos State Parkway in Commack
- East end: CR 58 in Calverton

Location
- Country: United States
- State: New York
- Counties: New York, Queens, Nassau, Suffolk

Highway system
- Interstate Highway System; Main; Auxiliary; Suffixed; Business; Future; New York Highways; Interstate; US; State; Reference; Parkways
← I-490	→ NY 531

Interstate 495 (I-495) is an auxiliary Interstate Highway in southeastern New York state. It is jointly maintained by the New York State Department of Transportation (NYSDOT), the New York City Department of Transportation (NYCDOT), MTA Bridges and Tunnels (TBTA), and the Port Authority of New York and New Jersey (PANYNJ). East of the Queens–Midtown Tunnel, I-495 is known as the Long Island Expressway (LIE). (Note: Each letter in the abbreviation is spelled out.)

Spanning approximately 66 miles (106 km), I-495 traverses Long Island from the western portal of the Queens–Midtown Tunnel in the New York City borough of Manhattan to County Route 58 (CR 58) in Riverhead in the east. I-495 intersects with I-295 in Bayside, Queens, through which it connects with I-95. The 2017 route log erroneously shows the section of highway between I-278 in Long Island City and I-678 in Corona as New York State Route 495 (NY 495).

The LIE designation, despite being commonly applied to all of I-495 east of the Queens–Midtown Tunnel, technically refers to the stretch of highway in Nassau and Suffolk counties. The section from the Queens Midtown Tunnel to Queens Boulevard is known as the Queens Midtown Expressway, and the section between Queens Boulevard and the Queens–Nassau county line is known as the Horace Harding Expressway. The service roads which run parallel to either side of the expressway in Queens are signed as Borden Avenue and Queens Midtown Expressway and as Horace Harding Expressway and Horace Harding Boulevard; from the Queens–Nassau county line to Sills Road, they are designated as the unsigned New York State Route 906A (NY 906A) and New York State Route 906B (NY 906B).

== Route description ==
=== New York City ===
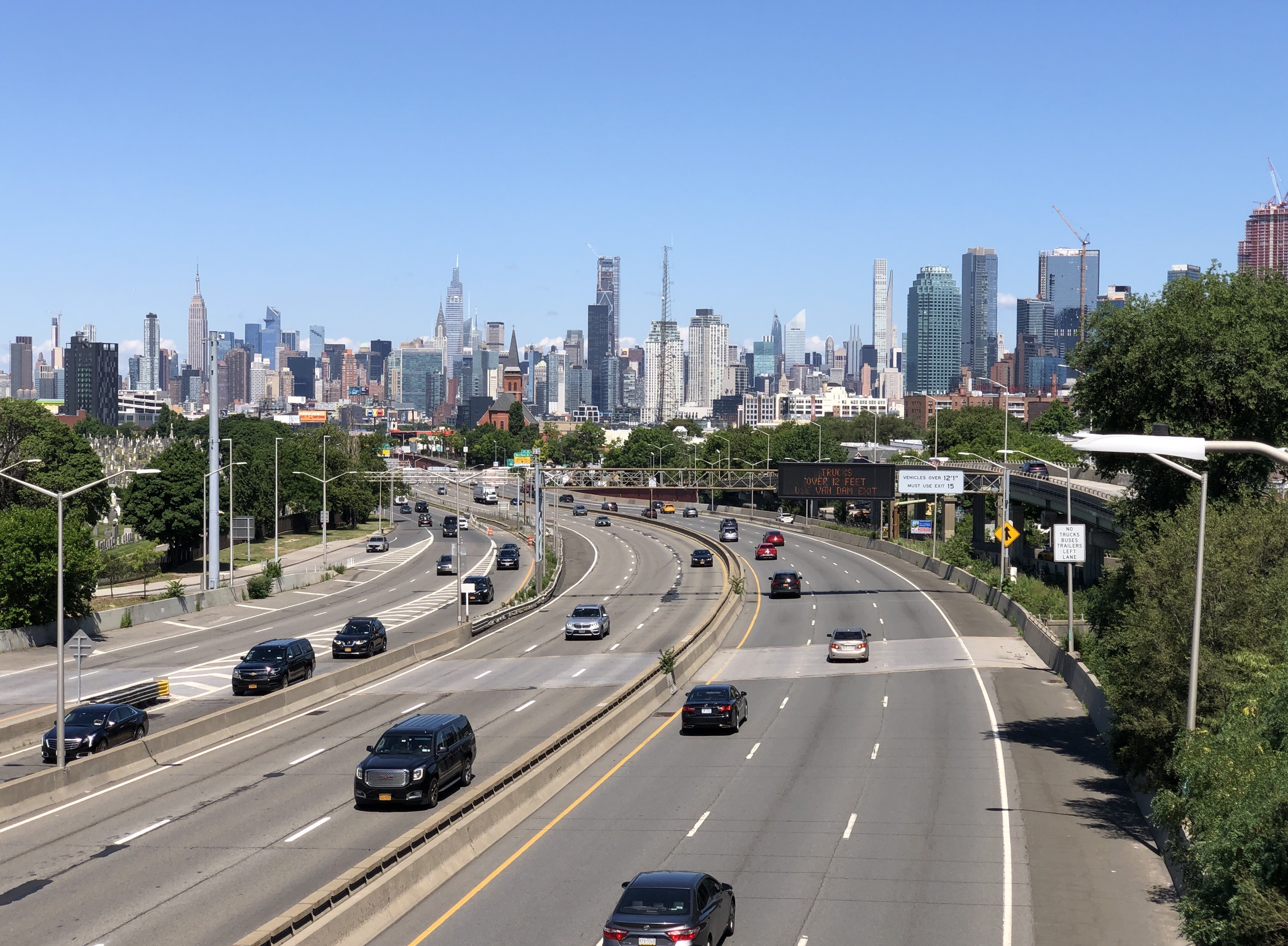
I-495 at the Brooklyn Queens Expressway, heading west toward Manhattan

The highway begins at the western end of the Queens–Midtown Tunnel in the Murray Hill section of Manhattan. The route heads eastward, passing under FDR Drive and the East River as it proceeds through the TBTA-maintained tunnel to Queens. Once on Long Island, the highway passes through the site of the tunnel's former toll plaza and becomes the Queens–Midtown Expressway as it travels through the western portion of the borough. A mile (1.6 km) after entering Queens, I-495 meets I-278 (Brooklyn–Queens Expressway) at exit 17, then briefly becomes a two-level, 12-lane highway traveling across Calvary Cemetery. Merging into one level at Maurice Avenue, I-495 continues through the neighborhoods of Maspeth, Elmhurst, and Rego Park. East of NY 25 (Queens Boulevard) in Rego Park, I-495 becomes the Horace Harding Expressway. I-495 heads northeast through Corona to Flushing Meadows–Corona Park, intersecting both the Grand Central Parkway and the Van Wyck Expressway (I-678) within the park limits. Because the interchanges in this area are close together, the highway employs two sets of collector–distributor roads through this area: one between 69th and 99th streets and one between the Grand Central Parkway and I-678.

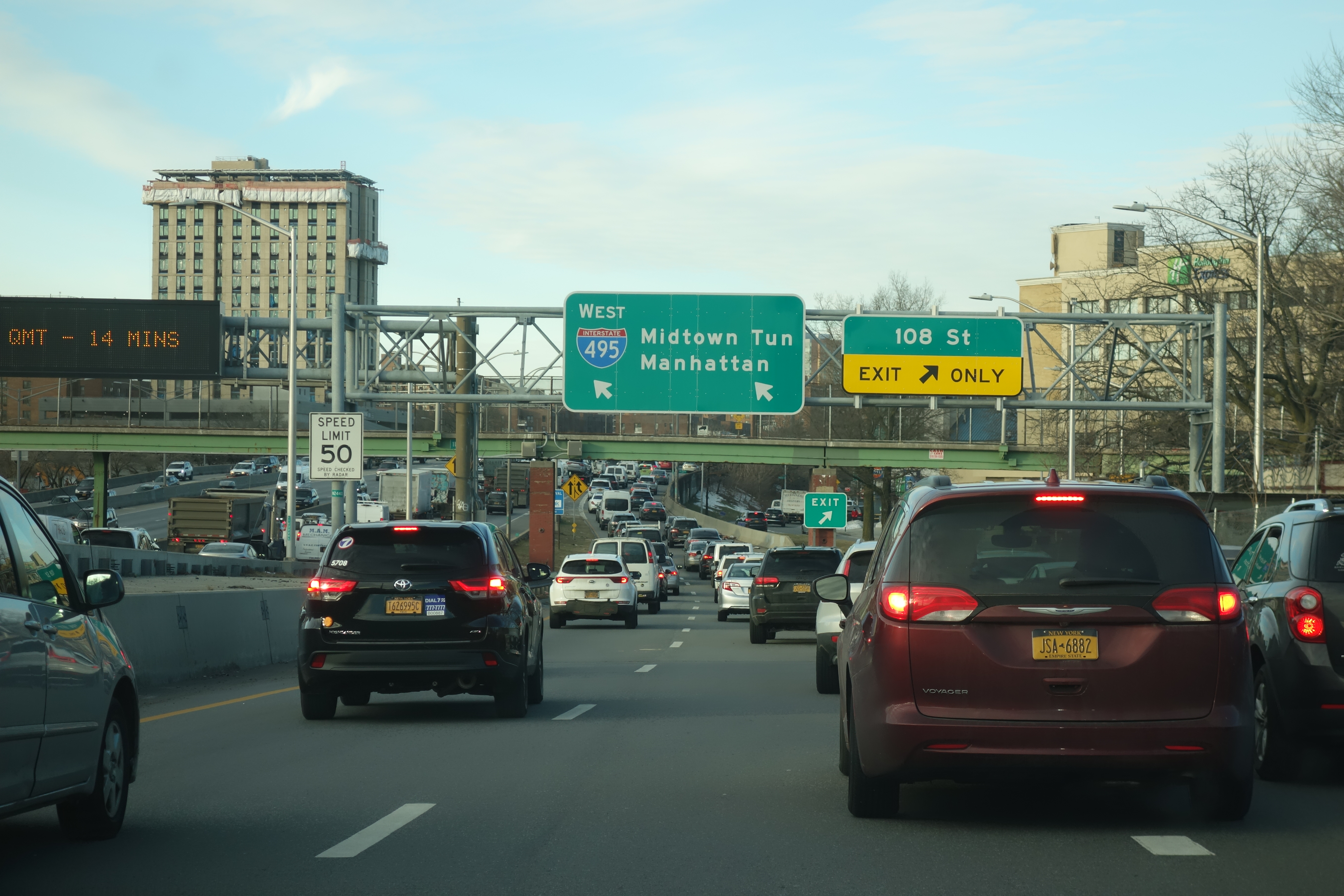
I-495 in Queens with heavy traffic. The LIE is locally known as "the world's longest parking lot".

The expressway continues east as a six-lane highway, veering to the southeast to bypass Kissena Park before curving back to the northeast to meet the Clearview Expressway (I-295) at the northern edge of Cunningham Park. Past I-295, I-495 passes by the "Queens Giant", the oldest and tallest tree in the New York metropolitan area. The tree, located just north of I-495 in Alley Pond Park, is visible from the highway's westbound lanes. To the east, the freeway connects to the Cross Island Parkway at exit 31 in the park prior to exiting the park. The highway has one final interchange, Exit 32 for Little Neck Parkway, before exiting the New York City limits, crossing into Nassau County and becoming the LIE.

Although the LIE name officially begins outside the New York City border, almost all locals and most signage use "the Long Island Expressway" or "the LIE" to refer the entire length of I-495. The service roads of I-495 are called Borden Avenue and Queens Midtown Expressway between I-278 and Queens Boulevard, and they are known as Horace Harding Expressway between Queens Boulevard and the Nassau County line. The Horace Harding Expressway section follows the path of Horace Harding Boulevard (also previously called Nassau Boulevard), which was named for J. Horace Harding (1863–1929), a finance magnate who directed the New York, New Haven and Hartford Railroad and the New York Municipal Railways System. Harding used his influence to promote the development of Long Island's roadways, lending strong support to Robert Moses's "great parkway plan". Harding also urged construction of a highway from Queens Boulevard to the Nassau County Line, in order to provide better access to Oakland Country Club, where he was a member. After his death, the boulevard he helped build was named for him. Horace Harding was not related to the former President Warren G. Harding.

=== Nassau and Suffolk counties ===
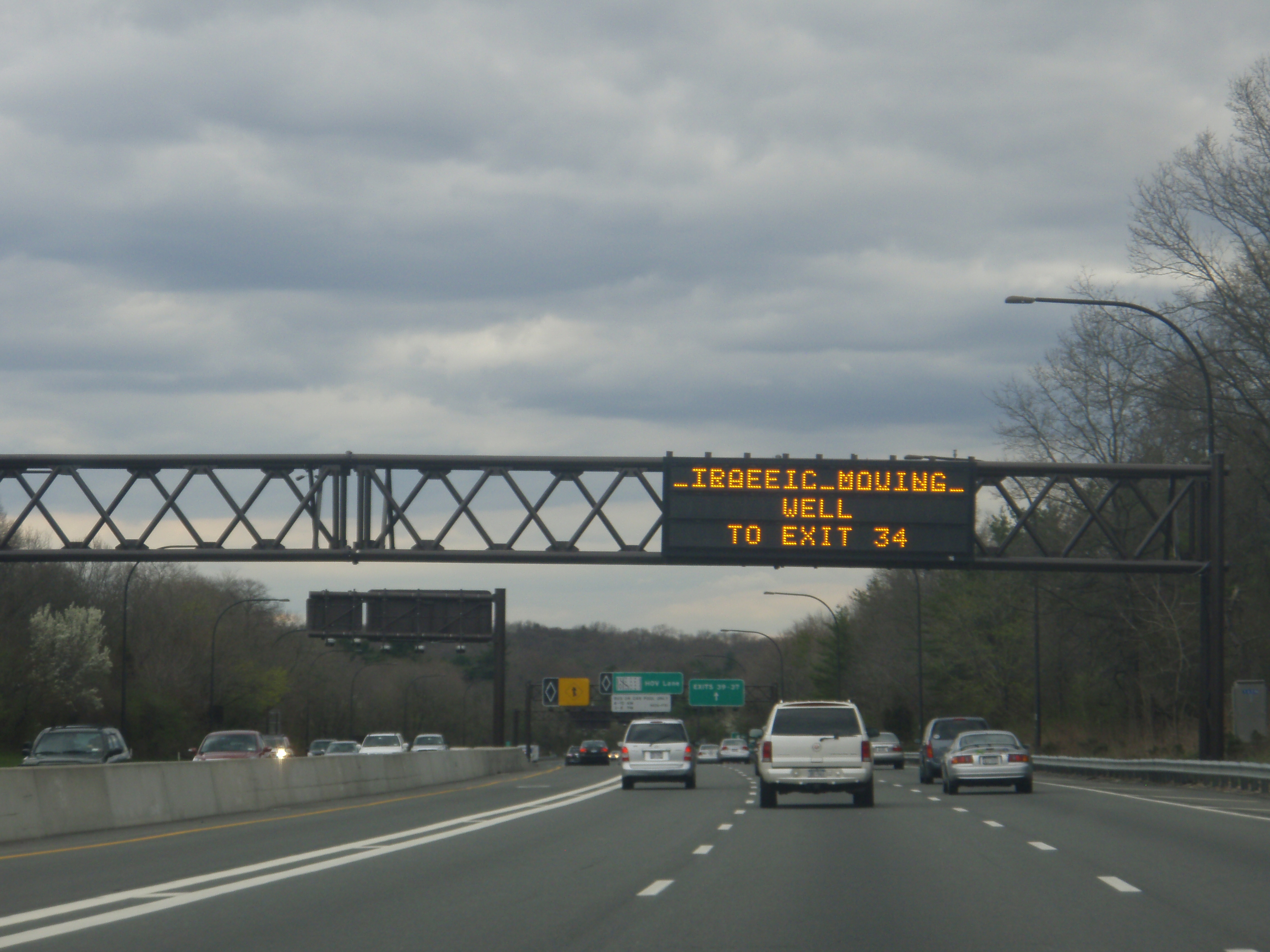
I-495 in Nassau County on Long Island

Heading into Nassau County, the expressway contains a high-occupancy vehicle (HOV) lane in each direction, which begins at exit 33 and runs to central Suffolk County. I-495 and the adjacent Northern State Parkway, which parallels the LIE through the county, meet three times, although they actually cross only once in between exit 45 and exit 46 near the county line in Plainview. Nearby in Syosset at exit 44, I-495 interchanges with the Seaford–Oyster Bay Expressway (NY 135). In Suffolk County, the LIE continues its eight-lane configuration with the HOV lane to exit 64 (NY 112). At this point, the HOV lane ends and the highway narrows to six lanes; additionally, the concrete Jersey barrier gives way to a wide, grassy median, the asphalt road surface is replaced by a concrete surface, and the expressway is no longer illuminated by streetlights, reflecting the road's location in a more rural area of Long Island.

From NY 112 east, the expressway runs through more rural, woodland areas on its way towards Riverhead. At exit 66 (County Route 101), the service roads become fragmented, and they fully terminate at exit 68 (William Floyd Parkway). Exit 70 (CR 111) in Manorville is the last full interchange, as it is the last interchange that allows eastbound traffic on, and the first to allow westbound off. After exit 71 (NY 24/Nugent Drive), the expressway begins to narrow as it approaches its eastern terminus. Until 2008, just before exit 72 (NY 25), the three eastbound lanes narrowed to two, which, in turn, narrowed almost immediately to a single lane at exit 73, which lies 800 feet (240 m) east of exit 72. As of 2008, of the two lanes, one lane is designated for exit 72 and the other is for exit 73, which ends the squeeze into a single lane that formerly existed at exit 73. At exit 73, all traffic along the expressway is diverted onto a ramp leading to eastbound CR 58, marking the east end of the route.

==== HOV restrictions ====
There is one HOV lane in each direction, in the median of the highway, between exit 32 (Little Neck Parkway), near the Queens–Nassau border, to exit 64 (NY 112), in central Suffolk County. From 6:00 am to 10:00 am and from 3:00 pm to 8:00 pm Monday through Friday, the HOV lanes are limited to busses, motorcycles, and passenger vehicles with at least two occupants. Trailers and commercial trucks are always prohibited therein. Vehicles are only allowed to enter and exit the lanes at designated junctions.

Originally, the HOV lanes were restricted to passenger vehicles with at least two occupants. In 2006, drivers of certain hybrid vehicle models were allowed to use the lanes even if they were driving alone under the Clean Pass Program. However, the restriction was removed in 2025, after the Program ended. By 2014, over one-third of all traffic on the LIE between exits 32 and 64 used the HOV lane during peak hours. NYSDOT contemplated restricting the lanes to passenger vehicles with at least three occupants but ultimately decided against this change.

== History ==
I-495 was constructed in stages from 1940 to 1972. Its completion was intended to alleviate congestion along local roads on Long Island. Most of the highway in Queens was built as part of the Interstate Highway System, with 90 percent funding from the federal government and 10 percent from the New York state government. The portion of the highway in Nassau and Suffolk counties was built with equal funding from the federal and state governments.

=== Construction of Queens segment ===
==== Queens–Midtown Expressway ====
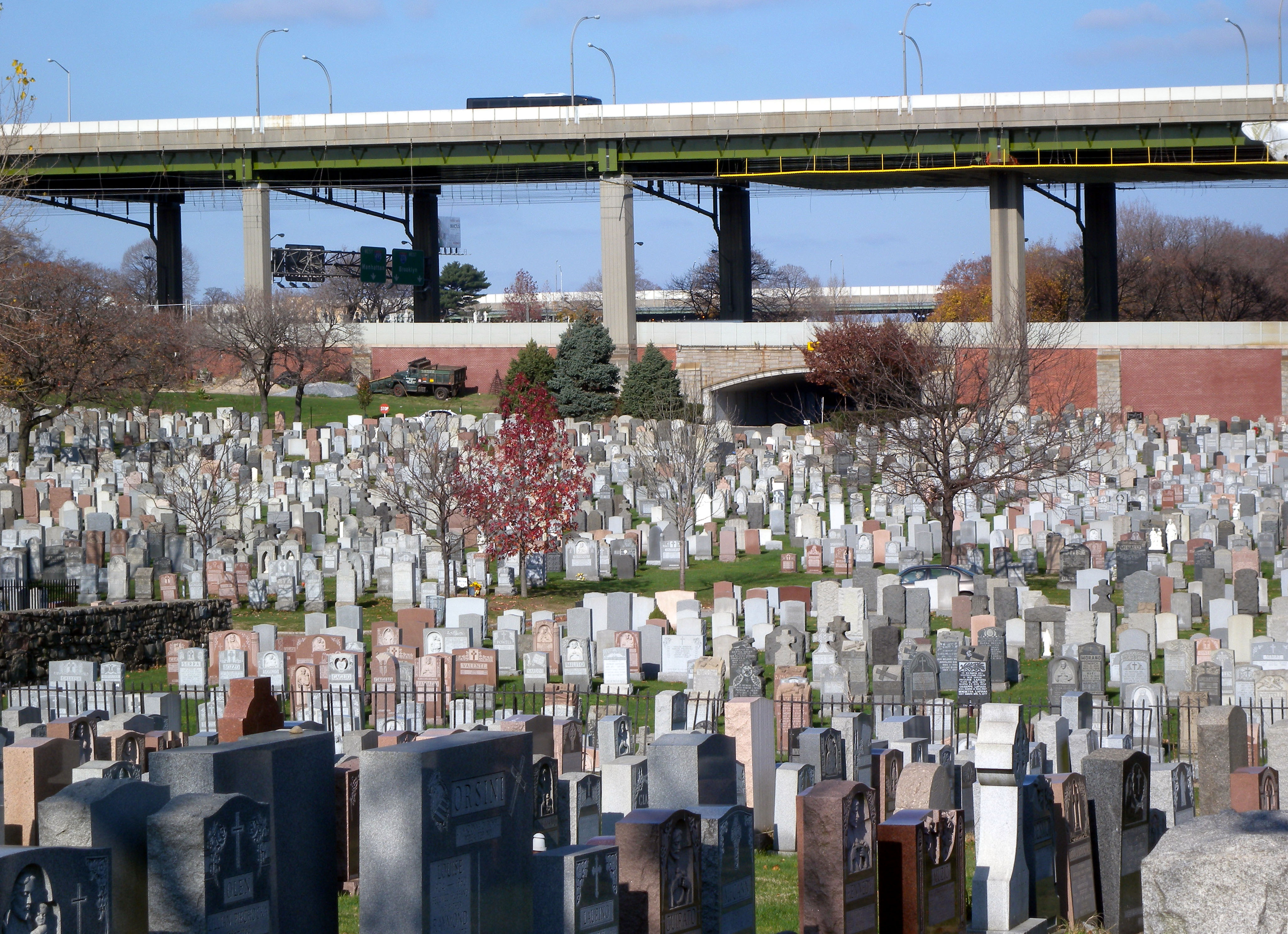
Crossing Calvary Cemetery in Queens

The first piece of what is now I-495 – the Queens–Midtown Tunnel, linking Manhattan and Queens – opened to traffic on November 15, 1940. The highway connecting the tunnel to Laurel Hill Boulevard was built around the same time and named the "Midtown Highway". The tunnel, the Midtown Highway, and the segment of Laurel Hill Boulevard between the highway and Queens Boulevard all became part of a realigned NY 24 in the mid-1940s. Parts of this highway were built on the right-of-way of a streetcar line that extended from Hunters Point to southern Flushing. In the 1940s, city planner Robert Moses proposed the construction of a system of highways that would traverse the New York City area. The plan was to cost $800 million (equivalent to $14.4 billion in 2025), and, in February 1945, the city agreed to pay $60 million (equivalent to $849 million in 2025) of that cost. That November, the city, state, and federal governments agreed to fund several new highways in New York City. Among these was the Queens Midtown Expressway, which was to cost $10.62 million (equivalent to $150 million in 2025).

Plans did not proceed further until March 1951, when Moses proposed constructing the six-lane Queens–Midtown Expressway between Laurel Hill and Queens boulevards. This was part of a larger, $30-million (equivalent to $298 million in 2025) plan that also included the Horace Harding Expressway. By October 1952, the cost of the two projects had increased to $55 million (equivalent to $535 million in 2025), of which the Queens–Midtown Expressway was to cost $21 million (equivalent to $204 million in 2025). To help fund the Queens–Midtown Expressway, Moses reallocated funding from two other highway projects in early 1953. That October, the New York City Planning Commission approved a minor revision to the Queens–Midtown Expressway's route in Maspeth and South Elmhurst, thus reducing land acquisition costs by $769,000 (equivalent to $7.38 million in 2025).

The city government awarded the first construction contracts for the highway in July 1953. The first section of the highway to open was the 1.1-mile (1.8 km) section between Laurel Hill Boulevard and Maurice Avenue, which opened on February 24, 1955. The six-lane highway ran through Calvary Cemetery. Afterward, the old Midtown Highway became known as the "Queens–Midtown Expressway". The entire highway from Laurel Hill Boulevard (by this point upgraded into the Brooklyn–Queens Expressway) to the junction of Queens Boulevard (NY 24 and NY 25) and Horace Harding Boulevard (NY 25D) opened on November 5, 1955. This 3.2-mile (5.1 km) section of the LIE had cost $29.5 million (equivalent to $276 million in 2025) and was funded by the TBTA, of which Moses was chair. NY 24 initially remained routed on Laurel Hill and Queens boulevards.

==== Horace Harding Expressway ====
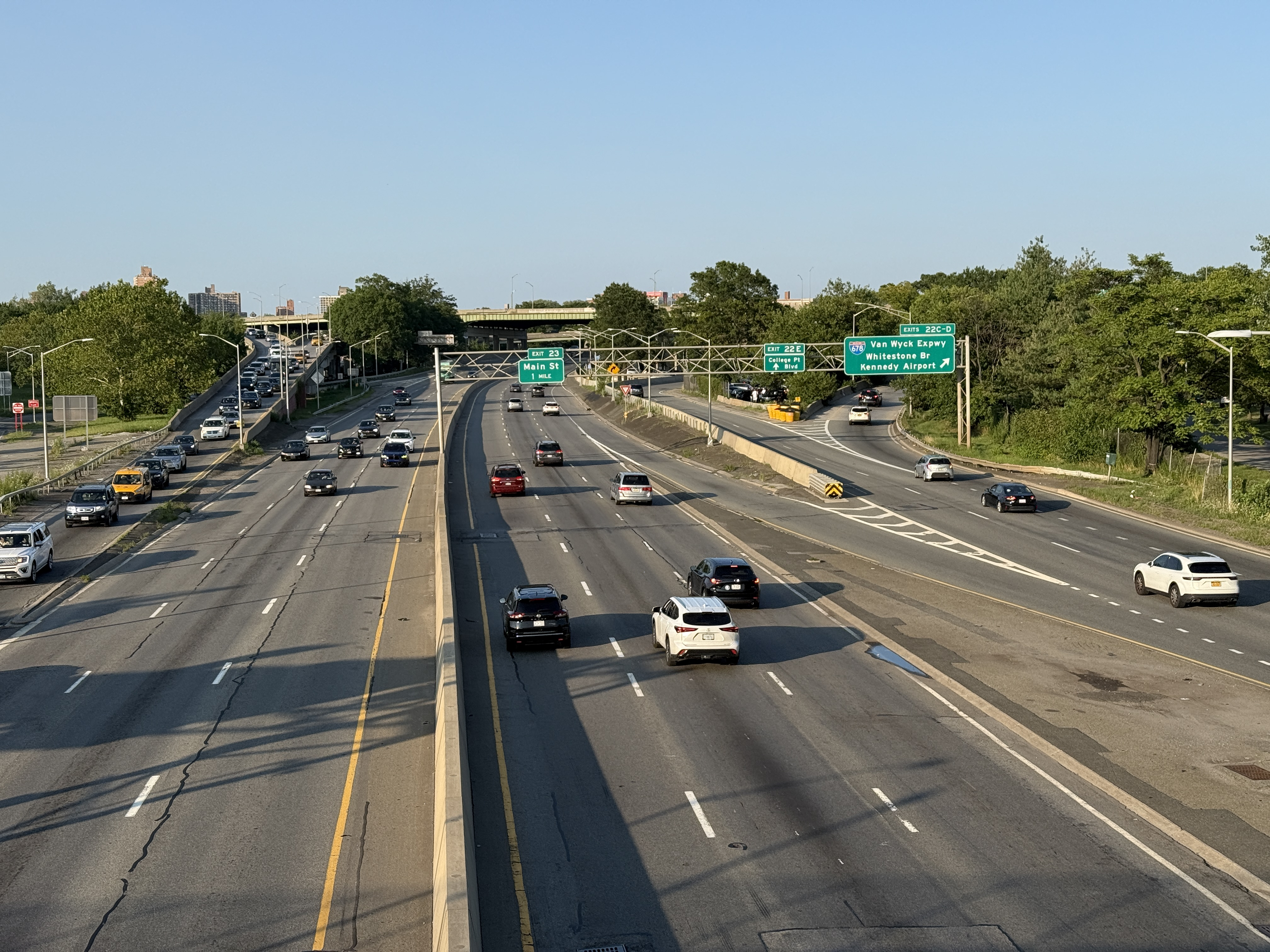
I-495 eastbound approaching I-678 in Queens

The LIE was built over much of Horace Harding Boulevard within eastern Queens and Power House Road within western Nassau County. Prior to the LIE's construction, the route was designated as NY 25D. As part of his March 1951 proposal for the Queens–Midtown Expressway, Moses proposed widening an 8.5-mile (13.7 km) stretch of Horace Harding Boulevard between Queens Boulevard and the Queens–Nassau border from 160 to 260 feet (49 to 79 m). That May, the New York City Board of Estimate approved the widening of Horace Harding Boulevard and Power House Road and constructing an expressway in the road's median at a cost of $25 million (equivalent to $248 million in 2025). The project's cost had increased to $34 million (equivalent to $330 million in 2025) by October 1952. The same year, the New York State Department of Public Works later modified the highway's route in the vicinity of Little Neck Parkway, near the Queens–Nassau border, because of complaints from residents. At Little Neck Parkway, Horace Harding Boulevard continued northeast and then eastward, whereas the LIE was to take a more southerly path.

Work began on the Horace Harding Expressway in 1955. However, it soon encountered delays because of weather conditions, construction worker strikes, and difficulties in building across existing roads and swampy land. Business owners along Horace Harding Boulevard complained that the project was reducing their income and isolating their businesses from surrounding neighborhoods. A 1.5-mile (2.4 km) section of the LIE near Alley Pond Park in eastern Queens, between Cloverdale Boulevard in Bayside and Little Neck Parkway, officially opened on September 25, 1957. The highway segment reduced the need for cars to use West Alley Road, a winding road that crossed the park. Construction on the section between Queens Boulevard in Elmhurst and Parsons Boulevard in Pomonok was several years behind schedule, but this section was open by mid-1959. For several months, the highway abruptly terminated at Parsons Boulevard, and barriers funneled traffic onto the service road; the highway was extended to Peck Avenue in Fresh Meadows in late 1959.

The section of the LIE west of the Clearview Expressway was designated as I-495 in October 1958. The windmill interchange with the Clearview Expressway (I-295) in Bayside was the last section of the LIE in New York City to be completed. Construction on that interchange had started in January 1959. By early 1960, the LIE saw more than 120,000 vehicles per day, although congestion frequently built up at Bayside. The marshy land in the vicinity of Flushing Meadows–Corona Park caused cracking on the expressway's pavement. The 0.9-mile (1.4 km) segment of the LIE near the Clearview Interchange, between Peck Avenue and 224th Street, officially opened on August 12, 1960. The interchange itself, which contained eight ramps and eight overpasses, was not open at the time because I-295 was still under construction. Between 1961 and 1963, in advance of the 1964 New York World's Fair, the NYSDOT built service roads along I-495 in Flushing Meadows–Corona Park, and it constructed a partial interchange with I-678.

Originally, I-495's westbound and eastbound roadways in Queens were separated by a median measuring three to eight feet (0.91 to 2.44 m) wide, with a chainlink fence and emergency telephones. In 1960, state officials announced that they would install a Jersey barrier in the median between 207th Street and the Queens–Nassau border. The remainder of the highway in Queens still contained chainlink fences, which were expensive to repair and could not prevent head-on collisions. In 1970, work commenced on a two-year project to install a Jersey barrier in the median of I-495 from 108th Street to Little Neck Parkway, replacing a 12-foot-wide (3.7 m) median.

=== Extension to Long Island ===
Plans for a 90-mile (140 km) highway, the Central Motor Expressway, extending east to Riverhead in Suffolk County, Long Island, were first reported by regional newspaper Newsday in late 1953. This length included the Queens–Midtown Expressway, as well as the section of the Brooklyn–Queens Expressway south of the junction with the Queens–Midtown Expressway. Suffolk County supervisors endorsed the plans soon after they were announced. In 1954, New York State Governor Thomas E. Dewey approved plans for the LIE, extending 64 miles (103 km) between the Queens–Nassau border and Riverhead. Moses and New York City mayor Robert F. Wagner Jr. said that the proposed highway would not charge tolls, regardless of whether the expressway received federal funding under the Federal-Aid Highway Act of 1952. From the outset, a minimum speed limit of 40 mph (64 km/h) was enforced on the segment of the LIE in Nassau and Suffolk counties.

New York State Route 495
- Location: Long Island
- Existed: 1958–1983

==== Nassau County ====
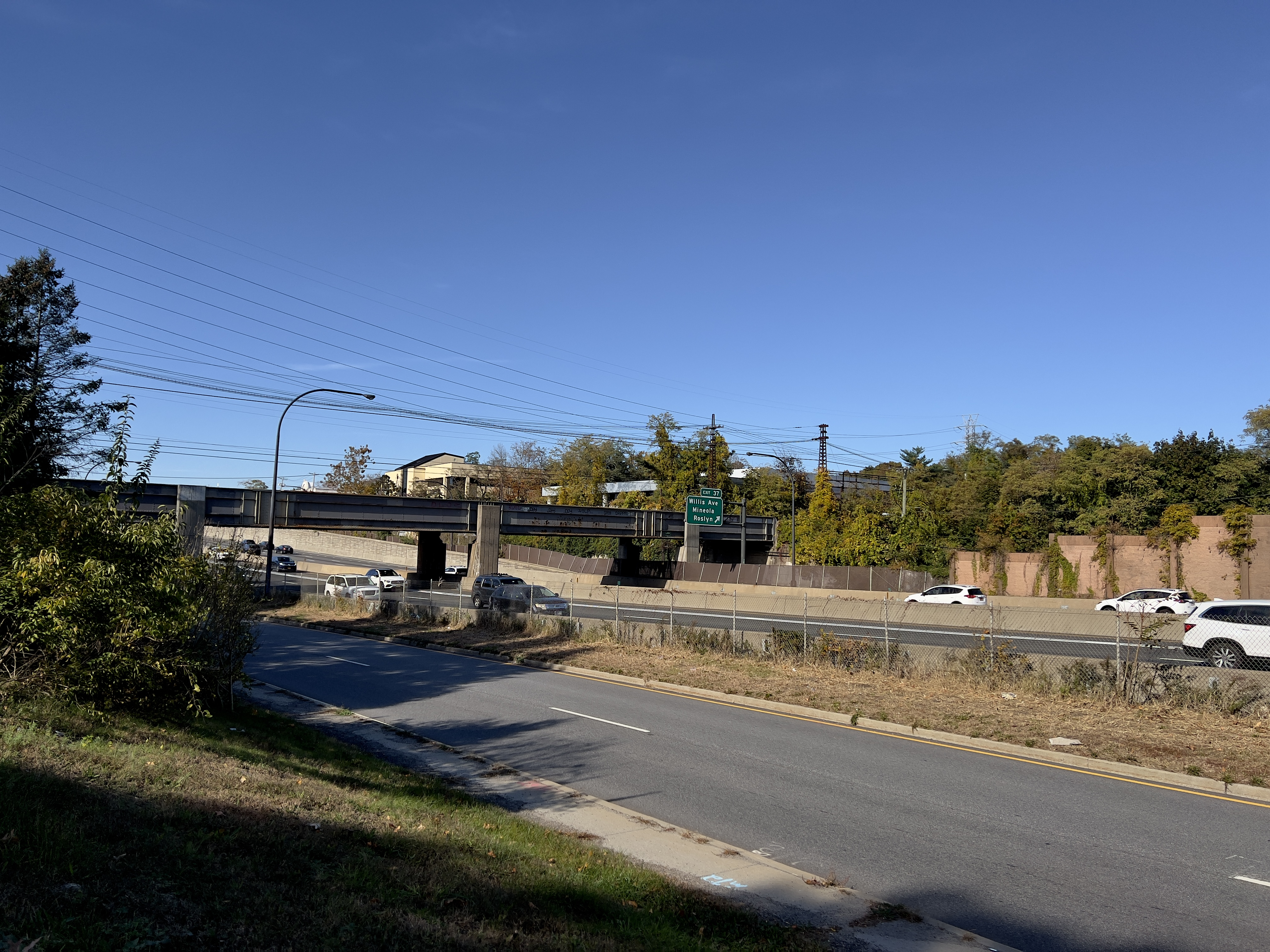
The LIE in Roslyn Heights looking west from Parkside Drive in 2021. This segment of the LIE between Willis Avenue and Glen Cove Road opened in 1959.

On September 30, 1958, the first section of the LIE outside New York City, a five-mile (8.0 km) segment from the Queens–Nassau county line to Willis Avenue in Roslyn Heights, officially opened to traffic. The section of the LIE between Roslyn and the Nassau–Suffolk border was initially controversial; at a public hearing in late 1957, 100 homeowners criticized the alignment of that section of highway. By early the next year, work had commenced on the section of the LIE between Guinea Woods Road (now Glen Cove Road) and Jericho Turnpike. The New York state government awarded a construction contract for the section of the LIE between Jericho Turnpike and South Oyster Bay Road in June 1959. This was followed in November 1959 by a contract for the section between South Oyster Bay Road and the Suffolk County border.

The LIE was extended to Glen Cove Road in Roslyn on September 29, 1959, with ramps to and from the Northern State Parkway. By this time, the LIE was continuous between Bayside and Roslyn. After the Clearview Interchange opened, the LIE was continuous between Manhattan and Roslyn, and it was designated in its entirety as NY 24. The old surface alignment of NY 24 south of the expressway became NY 24A. The LIE was extended east from Glen Cove Road to NY 106/NY 107 in Jericho on October 8, 1960, and was then opened to South Oyster Bay Road in Syosset in December 1960. By 1962, the NY 24 designation was removed from the LIE and reassigned to its former surface alignment to the south, while the portion of the freeway east of the Clearview Expressway became NY 495 (and later, I-495).

==== Suffolk County ====
By 1958, it was estimated that the entire highway would not be completed until 1970. Real-estate developers believed that the LIE's construction was not proceeding quickly enough, and Suffolk County's supervisors also advocated for the highway to be completed as soon as possible. Bidding for the first section of the LIE in Suffolk County, from the Nassau border to NY 110 in Melville, began in February 1960. Supporters of the highway believed that its completion would reduce traffic on Long Island's west–east arterial roads. Over the next decade, the completion of the LIE in Suffolk County spurred significant population growth in communities along its route.

Over one-third of the LIE within Suffolk County—a 15-mile (24 km) section from Melville to Veterans Memorial Highway (now NY 454) near Islandia—was opened to traffic between 1962 and 1963. A five-mile (8.0 km) extension of the LIE from Oyster Bay Road to NY 110 opened in August 1962, bringing the highway into Suffolk County. The rest of the highway to Islandia was constructed simultaneously. A 3.5-mile (5.6 km) extension from NY 110 to Deer Park Road opened in October 1962, followed the next month by another 2.7-mile (4.3 km) segment from Deer Park Road to Commack Road. A further 6.5-mile (10.5 km) extension opened to NY 454 in August 1963.

Three more sections of the LIE, from Islandia to exit 71 near Riverhead, were completed in 1969 and 1970. The 5.3-mile (8.5 km) segment from Veterans Memorial Highway to Patchogue–Holbrook Road was opened on October 27, 1966, by governor Nelson Rockefeller. The discontinuous section of highway between William Floyd Parkway and exit 71 opened in June 1969 and was extended west to Holbrook in December 1969. A six-mile (9.7 km) segment between Horseblock Road and Holbrook, connecting the two sections of the LIE, continued for several months. After this section opened on June 9, 1970, the LIE was continuous between Manhattan and Riverhead. There were delays in constructing the easternmost two miles (3.2 km) of the LIE from exit 71 to CR 58. The extension to CR 58 opened to traffic on June 28, 1972.

=== Modifications ===
Officials had originally predicted that the LIE would carry 80,000 vehicles per day by 1970. In part because of induced demand, the highway was ineffective in reducing traffic. By 1962, the LIE had reached its peak capacity, carrying between 125,000 and 150,000 vehicles per day. Officials considered constructing four reversible lanes above the existing highway in Queens; this plan would have cost about $100 million (equivalent to $814 million in 2025). New York City's commissioner of highways also proposed constructing a monorail to alleviate congestion on I-495 in Queens. These plans did not come to fruition, and, by the late 1960s, average rush-hour speeds were about five miles per hour (8.0 km/h). The Queens section of I-495 alone carried 180,000 vehicles per day. Major chokepoints existed at the interchanges with I-278, the Grand Central Parkway, I-678, I-295, and the Cross Island Parkway. The westbound roadway between Junction Boulevard and 108th Street also suffered from severe congestion, as did the eastbound roadway near Springfield Boulevard. By 1972, the highway was being used by over 150,000 vehicles a day.

State officials announced plans to designate the segment of the LIE east of I-295 as an Interstate highway following the passage of the Federal-Aid Highway Act of 1968. The American Association of State Highway and Transportation Officials did not formally extend the I-495 designation from New York City to Riverhead until May 1984. Subsequently, the entirety of the LIE was designated as I-495.

==== Additional lanes in Queens ====
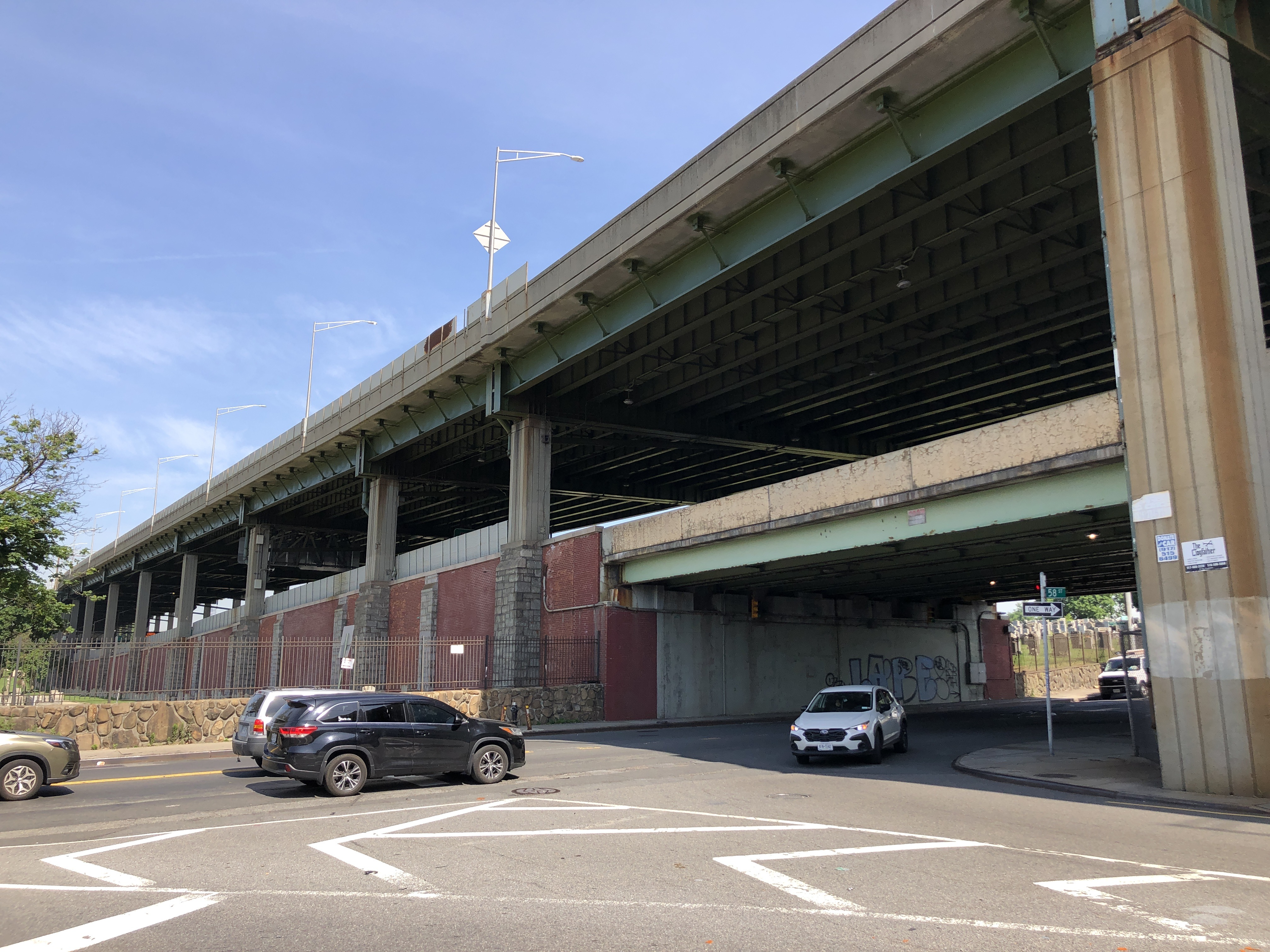
Double-decker section of I-495 in Queens, just east of the BQE

The ramp from the westbound I-495 to the westbound I-278 in Queens was so congested that a traffic light was installed on that ramp in 1962. State officials planned to reconstruct the interchange, although the project was delayed for several years. In addition, they planned to build a six-lane viaduct above the existing highway between I-278 and 58th Street, which would carry traffic to and from the Queens–Midtown Tunnel. In 1966, the New York City Board of Estimate approved plans to reconstruct the interchange with I-278 as a cloverleaf interchange; the project was planned to cost around $70 million (equivalent to $530 million in 2025) and take three years. State officials awarded a contract for the project in June 1967, and work began that October. A ramp from the eastbound I-495 to I-278 opened in 1968. Starting in 1971, one lane of I-495 between the Queens–Midtown Tunnel and Maurice Avenue was converted to a westbound HOV and bus lane during the morning rush hour.

Plans to widen I-495 between I-278 and I-678 were announced by New York City mayor John Lindsay in January 1968. Two additional local lanes would be built beside the three existing lanes in each direction. The plans were postponed in 1974 after state voters failed to approve a bond issue that would have funded the project. By 1976, officials were again seeking to widen I-495 using federal funds. The federal government gave $270 million (equivalent to $1.72 billion in 2025) for the widening of I-495 in the 1970s, but the state government decided in 1978 to divide this funding among several projects. The state allocated $80 million (equivalent to $309 million in 2025) to improve medians and widen shoulders on I-495 in Queens. By the 1980s, the stretch of I-495 between I-278 and the Grand Central Parkway was frequently carrying 110 percent of its capacity, and there were frequent accidents. In 1981, officials proposed several improvements for that highway segment, including adding a two-lane grade-separated service road between the two highways, realigning service roads at 69th and 108th streets, and improving entrance and exit ramps.

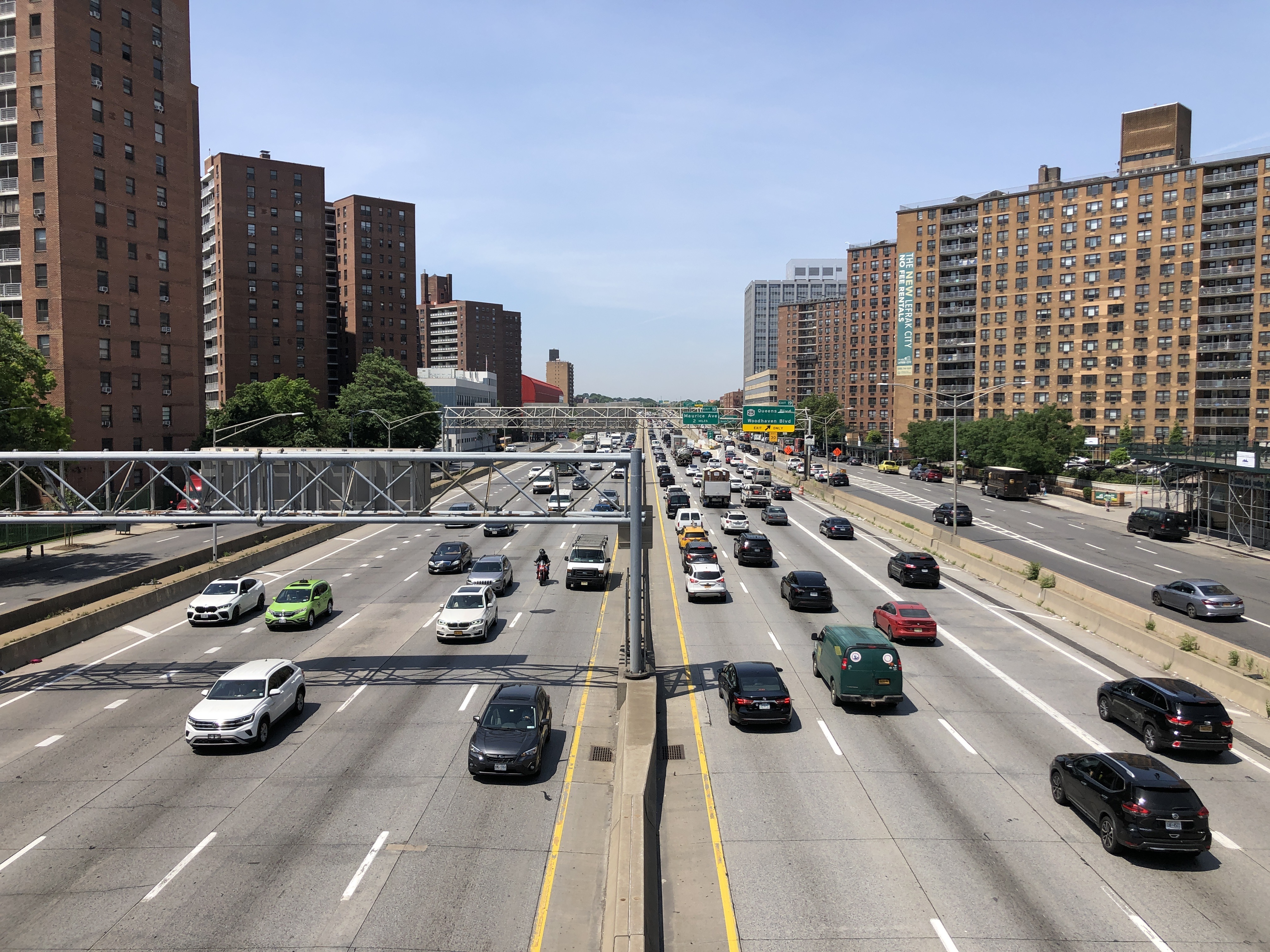
I-495 westbound in LeFrak City, Queens

==== Lighting and the HOV lanes ====
Initially, I-495 lacked street lights in Nassau and Suffolk counties. As early as 1969, the county executive for Nassau County had advocated for the installation of street lights along a 15-mile (24 km) stretch of the LIE within that county. Despite constant requests from Nassau County officials, no immediate plans were made until 1980, when the first streetlights were installed in eastern Nassau County. The state government planned to add about 1,425 lamps between the Queens–Nassau border and NY 112 (exit 64) since that segment of I-495 was heavily used. East of NY 112, vehicle usage dropped sharply, so no lights were planned. The final streetlights were installed in 2002.

As early as October 1968, state officials had wanted to widen the highway between I-295 and NY 135 from 6 to 10 lanes. In late 1988, the New York state government proposed adding a fourth lane in each direction to I-495 between Jericho and Medford. Following the passage of a $3-billion (equivalent to $7.04 billion in 2025) bond issue that year, the state proposed marking the additional lanes as HOV lanes. The state approved the construction of these lanes east of the Cross Island Parkway in 1991. The lanes were built in sections. The first section to open, a 12-mile (19 km) section in western Suffolk County, was opened in May 1994; two additional sections opened in 1998 and 1999. The lanes soon became well known due to a combination of advertising and free publicity in news articles, and they were heavily patronized even outside of peak hours. The lanes were completed on June 30, 2005, at which point they ran from exit 32 in eastern Queens to exit 64 at Medford in Suffolk County. The lanes had cost $880 million (equivalent to $1.39 billion in 2025) in total. NYSDOT officials estimated that, during rush hours, it would take 45 minutes to travel between exits 32 and 64 using the HOV lanes, as opposed to 90 to 120 minutes using the general-purpose lanes.

Construction of the HOV lanes within Queens was delayed due to opposition from local officials and the New York City Department of Parks and Recreation. The HOV segment in Queens was canceled altogether in 1998, when Governor George Pataki announced that the additional lanes between exits 30 and 32 in Queens would be entrance and exit lanes, rather than HOV lanes. The HOV project would have rebuilt many bridges along I-495 between exits 33 and 40 in Nassau County. As a concession to homeowners, the HOV lanes were narrowed and built within the existing roadbed, and the bridges were largely kept as is.

==== Late 1990s to present ====
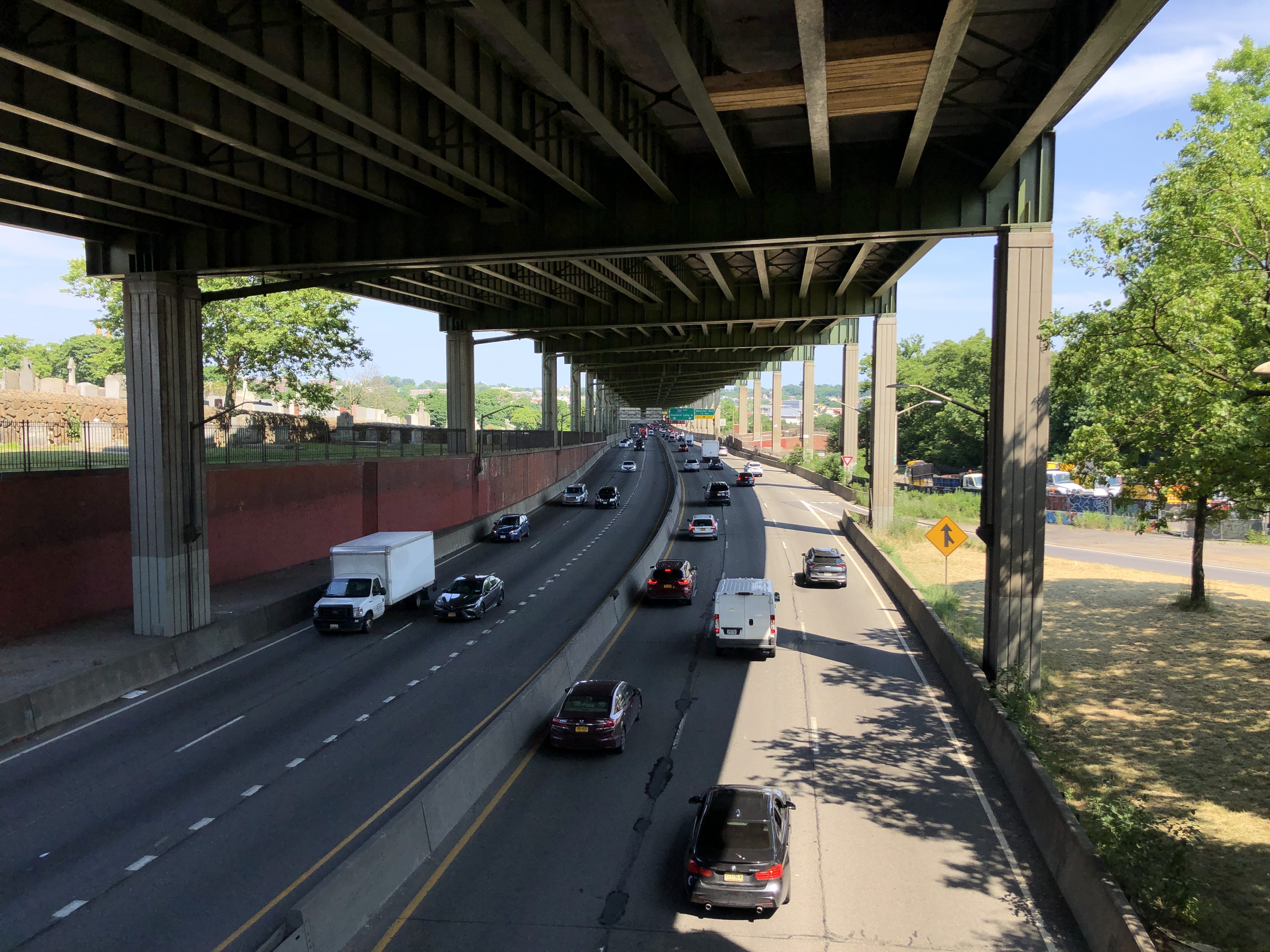
Eastbound along the double-decker section in Queens

Starting in 1998, I-495 was rebuilt between exit 15 (Van Dam Street) and exit 22 (Grand Central Parkway). The renovation cost $200 million (equivalent to $368 million in 2025) and entailed renovating the highway's main and service roads, improving bridges, and replacing drains. The service roads for exit 19 were rebuilt between 74th Street and Queens Boulevard. There were also plans to rebuild westbound exit 16 to Greenpoint Avenue in Long Island City.

The state announced a plan to renovate I-495 in the vicinity of Alley Pond Park and the Cross Island Parkway in 1995. In 2000, Pataki and New York City mayor Rudy Giuliani announced that this segment of I-495 between exits 29 and 32, near Alley Pond Park and the Cross Island Parkway, would be rebuilt at a cost of $112 million (equivalent to $199 million in 2025). The project was announced after the cancelation of the HOV lanes within Queens. Work started in August 2000 and was substantially completed by 2005. The project included the restoration of 12 acres (4.9 ha) within the park, as well as the construction of new ramps to and from the Cross Island Parkway at exit 30. As part of the reconstruction, two cloverleaf ramps were replaced with flyovers, the shoulders in each direction were converted into travel lanes, the westbound exit 31 to Douglaston Parkway was closed, and new collector–distributor ramps were installed east of the Cross Island Parkway interchange.

Starting in 2004, NYSDOT examined proposals to reconfigure exit 22 with I-678 and the Grand Central Parkway in Flushing Meadows-Corona Park. These included plans to construct direct ramps between the highways, relocating the service roads of I-495 so the mainline expressway could be widened, and rebuilding the at-grade junction between College Point Boulevard and Horace Harding Expressway. The interchange with Grand Central Parkway was rebuilt from early 2015 to February 2018, with the replacement of the three overpasses carrying I-495 over the parkway. The $55-million (equivalent to $69.4 million in 2025) reconstruction included extending merge lanes, replacing and adding lighting, and improving drainage structures.

=== Service roads and the proposed interchange ===
As I-495 was being built across Long Island, it was specifically designed to accommodate certain topographical conditions and proposed interchanges. Exit 30 was originally a partial cloverleaf interchange with the Cross Island Parkway, while eastbound exit 30S was for Easthampton Boulevard with a connecting ramp to the southbound Cross Island Parkway. Exit 31 was originally a westbound only interchange for Douglaston Parkway; it was later combined with the exit for Little Neck Parkway. Exit 39A was intended for the proposed extension of the Wantagh State Parkway near Powell Road in Old Westbury. It was intended to be a full Y interchange with an east-to-southbound-only offramp and a north-to-westbound-only onramp running beneath Powell Road.

Exit 40 originally had only same-directional offramps under the expressway providing access to realigned sections of NY 25. When exit 41 was originally constructed, it had no south-to-west connecting ramp. Westbound access to the expressway was provided at the nearby exit 40 onramp at NY 25. An alternate design for exit 42 called for it to be similar to the one proposed for NY 135 and the Bethpage State Parkway, and westbound exit 46 was originally a partial cloverleaf. Exit 47 was never built; it had been intended for the extension of the Bethpage State Parkway near Washington Avenue in Plainview. The site of exit 47 is now a truck inspection site between exits 46 and 48, which opened in 2006.

The original right-of-ways for the service roads between exits 48 and 49 were intended to weave around the steep Manetto Hills area of the main road, rather than running parallel to the road as it does today. The land between the service road and the main road was reserved for housing developments. The right-of-way for the original westbound service road still weaves through the development on the north side of the road. Exit 49 was originally a cloverleaf interchange with the outer ramps connecting to the service roads at a point closer to NY 110. This was in preparation for NY 110's formerly proposed upgrade into the Broad Hollow Expressway. After the project was canceled in the 1970s, the west-to-northbound onramp was moved to nearby CR 3 (Pinelawn Road), and the original ramp was replaced with a park and ride.

Exit 52 (Commack Road/CR 4) was intended to be moved west to an interchange with the formerly proposed Babylon–Northport Expressway (realigned NY 231) in the vicinity of the two parking areas. These ramps would have been accessible from the service roads. The westbound offramp and service road at exit 54 (Wicks Road/CR 7) originally terminated at the Long Island Motor Parkway, east of Wicks Road. The westbound onramp was squeezed between the northwest corner of the Wicks Road bridge and exit 53. Excessive weaving between exits 52, 53, and 54 caused NYSDOT to combine all three interchanges into one and replace the west-to-southbound offramp to the Sagtikos State Parkway with a flyover ramp. Exit 54 was eliminated during this project. Exit 55A was meant to be a trumpet interchange for the Hauppauge Spur of NY 347, between the Long Island Motor Parkway (exit 55) and NY 111 (exit 56). The service roads were intended to go around the interchange rather than run parallel to the main road. Ramps on the east side of the Long Island Motor Parkway and west side of NY 111 would be eliminated as part of the interchange's construction. Between exits 57 and 58, there was a proposed extension of the Northern State Parkway.

Prior to the construction of the interchange with CR 97 (Nicolls Road), exit 62 was for Morris and Waverly avenues eastbound and Morris Avenue westbound. Exit 68 was originally planned to be built as a cloverleaf interchange without collective–distributor roads. Additionally in the 1970s, Suffolk County Department of Public Works proposed an extension of East Main Street in Yaphank (CR 102) that would have terminated at the west end of this interchange.

In the 1960s and 1970s, the Suffolk County Planning Department considered extending CR 55 to the Grumman Calverton Naval Air Base between exits 70 and 71. This would have provided an additional interchange known as exit 70A. Exit 71 itself was intended to be a cloverleaf interchange with CR 94 (Nugent Drive) and the Hamptons Spur of the LIE. After the Hamptons Spur proposal was canceled, the plans for exit 71 were altered to call for a complete diamond interchange.

== Unbuilt expansions ==
=== Extensions of the expressway ===
The route of I-495, had it received its westward and eastward extensions. The existing segment is shown in black, while the western (Mid-Manhattan Expressway) and eastern (North Fork) extensions are shown in red. The green, pink, and brown lines each represent the different proposed Long Island Sound crossings for I-495.

==== Across Manhattan ====
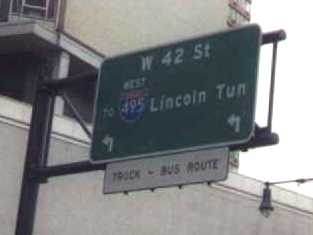
Signage for the Lincoln Tunnel on 12th Avenue (NY 9A), one of the few remaining signs of the former I-495 to New Jersey

Plans for I-495 called for it to extend across Manhattan on the Mid-Manhattan Expressway (MME, also called the Mid-Manhattan Elevated Expressway) to the Lincoln Tunnel, which it would follow into New Jersey and connect to the Eastern Spur of the New Jersey Turnpike (I-95) in Secaucus. The I-495 designation was assigned to the New Jersey approach to the tunnel in anticipation of the MME being completed. However, the project was canceled and the MME was officially removed from I-495 on January 1, 1970. The New Jersey stretch of I-495 became Route 495 in 1979.

Manhattan Borough President Samuel Levy first proposed the MME connector in 1936. The plan called for an expressway link crossing Midtown Manhattan near 34th Street, then, as now, a heavily traveled crosstown surface street. The original idea was a pair of two-lane tunnels, the MME connecting the West Side Highway on Hudson River and the FDR Drive on the East River. By 1949, Moses had proposed a six-lane elevated expressway along 30th Street. The expressway was to have two exits, connecting to the West Side Highway and Lincoln Tunnel on the west side of Manhattan and also to the Queens–Midtown Tunnel and FDR Drive on the east side of the island. It would be constructed within a 100-foot-wide (30 m) right-of-way immediately south of 30th Street. The viaduct would require substantial demolition of highrise buildings within Midtown Manhattan. Moses suggested charging tolls on the new roadway, which was estimated to cost $26 million (equivalent to $278 million in 2025) to construct, excluding $23 million (equivalent to $246 million in 2025) in land acquisition costs.

A later proposal had the roadway situated 10 stories above valuable commercial real estate. Air rights above the expressway would be sold and new highrise buildings would be constructed above the expressway; buildings would be constructed below the viaduct as well. One unusual variation involved running the roadway through the sixth and seventh floors of the Empire State Building. In 1963, plans for the expressway were finalized, and it received the I-495 designation. Beginning from its elevated connections to 12th Avenue (NY 9A) or the West Side Highway, the MME would mostly follow 30th Street east of Ninth Avenue. The expressway would travel east as a six-lane elevated route, 10 stories above the city streets to allow for commercial development both above and below the skyway deck. At Second Avenue, it would swing north for connections with the FDR Drive. Between First and Second avenues, ramps would be constructed to provide access to the Queens–Midtown Tunnel.

On December 22, 1965, TBTA announced that it had purchased a $1 million parcel of land at the northwest corner of Second Avenue and 29th Street as right-of-way that would be needed to construct the MME. Although the project had not yet been approved, the property was purchased because construction of a 20-story building was beginning on the site and TBTA wanted to avoid incurring higher condemnation costs later on if the building was completed and the MME was approved. Upon the suggestion of incoming New York City Parks Commissioner Thomas Hoving, Moses agreed to allow the land to be used as a temporary park before the expressway was built. The park opened in 1967 and was named Vincent F. Albano Jr. Playground in 1989. As of 2024, the property is still owned by TBTA.

On December 28, 1965, Moses announced that the third tube of the Queens–Midtown Tunnel could be constructed without the completion of the new expressway approaches. According to The New York Times, this decision was viewed as an unspoken admission by Moses that the approval could not be obtained for the proposed expressways, which included the MME. The I-495 designation was removed from the expressway on January 1, 1970. In 1971, New York Governor Nelson Rockefeller removed state plans for the MME, along with about a dozen other highway plans including I-78 through New York City, of which another crosstown highway known as the Lower Manhattan Expressway (LOMEX) was part.

==== Across Suffolk County ====
Long Island lobbied to extend I-495 east over NY 495. The extension took place in the early 1980s, at which time the NY 495 signs were taken down and I-495 was extended to the east end of the LIE. The section of I-495 in the vicinity of the Lincoln Tunnel was redesignated as NY 495 at this time. The extension of I-495 to Riverhead makes the highway a spur, which should have an odd first digit according to the Interstate Highway System's numbering scheme. Even first digits are usually assigned to bypasses, connectors, and beltways, as I-495 was prior to the 1980s. A proposed Long Island Crossing would have extended the LIE across Long Island Sound to I-95 in either Guilford, Connecticut; Old Saybrook, Connecticut; or Westerly, Rhode Island via a series of existing and artificial islands, but a lack of funding as well as public opposition led to the demise of these proposals. CR 48 in Suffolk County was originally intended to become part of the North Fork extension of the LIE.

=== Subway line ===
A New York City Subway line along the LIE corridor had been proposed in the 1929 and 1939 IND Second System plans as an extension of the BMT Broadway Line east of the 60th Street Tunnel, prior to the construction of the expressway. These were the predecessors to a line proposed in 1968 as part of the Program for Action. It would have split from the IND Queens Boulevard Line west of the Woodhaven Boulevard station and go to Kissena Boulevard via a right-of-way parallel and adjacent to the LIE. In Phase I, it would have gone to Kissena Boulevard at Queens College and, in Phase II, to Fresh Meadows and Bayside. This "Northeastern Queens" line would have been built in conjunction with the planned widening of the expressway. The subway tracks would have been placed under the expressway or its service roads or in the median of a widened LIE in a similar manner to the Blue Line of the Chicago "L". It had been previously proposed to run the line from the 63rd Street tunnel under Northern Boulevard to Flushing (near the current Flushing–Main Street station), then south under Kissena and Parsons boulevards to meet with the LIE at Queens College.

The LIE line was approved in July 1968. The line was opposed by many residents of the surrounding communities because it would entail widening I-495, which would necessitate the demolition of nearby homes. By 1973, the final design for the Northeast Queens LIE line was published. The LIE line was canceled later that year because state residents had voted against a $3.5-billion (equivalent to $19.3 billion in 2025) bond measure that would have paid for five subway extensions, including the LIE line. This was the second time that voters declined a bond issue to finance this extension, with the first being on November 2, 1971, for $2.5 billion (equivalent to $15.2 billion in 2025).

== Exit list ==
County	Location	mi	km	Exit	Destinations	Notes
Manhattan	Murray Hill	0.00	0.00	11	34th-41st Streets / 2nd-3rd Avenues to NY 495 west (Lincoln Tunnel) – Downtown, Crosstown, Uptown	Westbound exits from the Queens–Midtown Tunnel
Manhattan	Murray Hill	0.00	0.00	12	2nd Avenue / 34th Street / 40th Street	Eastbound entrances to the Queens–Midtown Tunnel
East River		1.01	1.63	Queens–Midtown Tunnel (toll)		
Queens	Hunters Point	1.43	2.30	13	Borden Avenue – Pulaski Bridge	Eastbound exit and entrance
Queens	Hunters Point	1.53	2.46	14	NY 25A east (21st Street) – Long Island City	Eastbound exit and westbound entrance; western terminus of NY 25A
Queens	Long Island City	2.09	3.36	15	Van Dam Street – Ed Koch Queensboro Bridge	Westbound exit and entrance; last westbound exit before toll
Queens	Long Island City	2.34	3.77	16	Hunters Point Avenue / Greenpoint Avenue – Ed Koch Queensboro Bridge	Westbound exit and eastbound entrance
Queens	Long Island City	2.61	4.20	17	I-278 (Brooklyn–Queens Expressway) / 48th Street to I-95 – Brooklyn, Staten Island, Bronx, LaGuardia Airport	Signed as exits 17W (west) and 17E (east); no westbound access to I-278 east; exits 35E-W on I-278
Queens	Maspeth	3.47	5.58	18B	Maurice Avenue	No eastbound exit
Queens	Elmhurst	4.30	6.92	18A	69th Street / Grand Avenue	Westbound exit and eastbound entrance; part of exit 19
Queens	Elmhurst	5.27	8.48	19	NY 25 (Queens Boulevard) / Woodhaven Boulevard – Rockaways	
Queens	Elmhurst	5.58	8.98	20	Junction Boulevard	Westbound exit and eastbound entrance
Queens	Corona	6.91	11.12	21	108th Street	Eastbound exit and westbound entrance
Queens	Corona	7.25	11.67	22A	Grand Central Parkway – RFK Bridge, Eastern Long Island	Signed as exits 22A (east) and 22B (west) eastbound; exits 10W-E on Grand Central Parkway
Queens	Corona	7.35	11.83	22B	I-678 (Van Wyck Expressway) / College Point Boulevard – Whitestone Bridge, Kennedy Airport	Signed as exits 22C (I-678 south), 22D (I-678 north) and 22E (College Point) eastbound; exits 12A-B on I-678
Queens	Flushing	8.45	13.60	23	Main Street	
Queens	Flushing	9.10	14.65	24	Kissena Boulevard	
Queens	Fresh Meadows	10.02	16.13	25	Utopia Parkway / 164th Street / 188th Street – St. John's University	Signed for 164th Street westbound, 188th Street eastbound
Queens	Fresh Meadows	11.04	17.77	26	Francis Lewis Boulevard	Eastbound exit and westbound entrance
Queens	Bayside	11.43	18.39	27	I-295 (Clearview Expressway) to NY 25 (Hillside Avenue) / Grand Central Parkway – Bronx	Signed as exits 27S (south) and 27N (north); exits 4E-W on I-295; former I-78
Queens	Bayside	11.93	19.20	28	Oceania Street / Francis Lewis Boulevard	Westbound exit and eastbound entrance
Queens	Bayside	12.31	19.81	29	Springfield Boulevard	
Queens	Bayside	12.91	20.78	30	East Hampton Boulevard / Douglaston Parkway	Eastbound exit only
Queens	Oakland Gardens	13.27	21.36	31	Cross Island Parkway – Kennedy Airport, Whitestone Bridge	Signed as exits 31S (south) and 31N (north); no eastbound access to Parkway north; exits 30E-W on Cross Island Parkway
Queens	Little Neck	14.25	22.93	32	Little Neck Parkway to Douglaston Parkway	No eastbound access to Douglaston Parkway
Nassau	Lake Success	15.43	24.83	33	Lakeville Road / Community Drive – Great Neck	
Nassau	North Hills	16.37	26.34	34	New Hyde Park Road	
Nassau	North Hills	17.57	28.28	35	Shelter Rock Road – Manhasset	No westbound exit
Nassau	North Hills	18.43	29.66	36	Searingtown Road – Port Washington	Port Washington not signed westbound
Nassau	Roslyn Heights	18.95	30.50	37	Willis Avenue – Mineola, Roslyn	
Nassau	East Hills	20.14	32.41	38	Northern State Parkway east to Meadowbrook State Parkway south – Hauppauge, Jones Beach	Eastbound exit and westbound entrance; exit 29A on Northern State Parkway
Nassau	East Hills–Old Westbury village line	20.31	32.69	39	Glen Cove Road – Hempstead, Glen Cove	
Nassau	Jericho	24.07	38.74	40	NY 25 (Jericho Turnpike) – Mineola, Syosset	Signed as exits 40W (west) and 40E (east)
Nassau	Jericho	25.23	40.60	41	NY 106 / NY 107 (North Broadway) – Hicksville, Oyster Bay	Signed as exits 41S (south) and 41N (north)
Nassau	Jericho	26.05	41.92	42	Northern State Parkway – New York, Hauppauge	Same-directional access only; no entrance ramps
Nassau	Syosset			43A	Robbins Lane	Westbound exit and eastbound entrance
Nassau	Syosset	27.07	43.56	43	South Oyster Bay Road – Bethpage, Syosset	
Nassau	Syosset–Woodbury line	27.83	44.79	44	NY 135 – Seaford, Syosset	Signed as exits 44S (south) and 44N (north) eastbound; exits 13E-W on NY 135
Nassau	Woodbury	28.17	45.34	45	Manetto Hill Road – Plainview, Woodbury	Eastbound exit and westbound entrance via Angel Way
Nassau	Plainview	28.95	46.59	46	Sunnyside Boulevard – Plainview	
Nassau	Plainview	29.65	47.72	Truck inspection station (eastbound)		
Nassau–Suffolk county line	Plainview–Melville line	29.68	47.77	48	Old Country Road – Old Bethpage, Farmingdale	Signed as Round Swamp Road
Suffolk	Melville	31.82	51.21	49	NY 110 – Amityville, Huntington	Signed as exits 49S (south) and 49N (north)
Suffolk	Melville–Dix Hills line	34.25	55.12	50	Bagatelle Road – Dix Hills, Wyandanch	
Suffolk	Dix Hills	35.87	57.73	51	NY 231 – Babylon, Northport	
Suffolk	Dix Hills	37.00	59.55	Rest Area & Long Island Welcome Center (eastbound)		
Suffolk	Dix Hills	38.56	62.06	52	CR 4 (Commack Road) – North Babylon, Commack	Eastbound exit and westbound entrance
Suffolk	Brentwood–Commack line	39.28	63.22	53	Sagtikos State Parkway to Northern State Parkway – Bay Shore, Kings Park	Exits S1E-W on Sagtikos State Parkway; Northern State Parkway not signed eastbound
Suffolk	Brentwood	39.28	63.22	54	Wicks Road (CR 7)	Now an unnumbered interchange via exit 53
Suffolk	Brentwood–Hauppauge line	41.72	67.14	55	CR 67 (Motor Parkway) – Central Islip	
Suffolk	Hauppauge	42.66	68.65	56	NY 111 – Islip, Smithtown	
Suffolk	Islandia	44.30	71.29	57	NY 454 – Patchogue, Commack	
Suffolk	Islandia	45.64	73.45	58	Old Nichols Road – Central Islip, Nesconset	
Suffolk	Ronkonkoma	47.50	76.44	59	CR 93 (Ocean Avenue) – Oakdale, Ronkonkoma	
Suffolk	Lake Ronkonkoma	48.19	77.55	60	Ronkonkoma Avenue (CR 29) – Lake Ronkonkoma, Sayville	
Suffolk	Holbrook	49.62	79.86	61	CR 19 (Patchogue–Holbrook Road) – Patchogue, Holbrook	
Suffolk	Holtsville	51.24	82.46	62	CR 97 (Nicolls Road) – Stony Brook, Blue Point	
Suffolk	Holtsville–Farmingville– Medford tripoint	53.04	85.36	63	CR 83 (North Ocean Avenue) – Mount Sinai, Patchogue	
Suffolk	Medford	54.29	87.37	64	NY 112 – Patchogue, Port Jefferson	
Suffolk	Medford	55.44	89.22	65	CR 16 (Horse Block Road) – Centereach, Shirley	
Suffolk	Yaphank	57.41	92.39	66	CR 101 (Sills Road) – East Patchogue, Yaphank	
Suffolk	Yaphank	58.55	94.23	67	CR 21 (Yaphank Avenue) – Yaphank, Brookhaven	
Suffolk	Yaphank	60.17	96.83	68	CR 46 (William Floyd Parkway) – Wading River, Shirley	Signed as exits 68S (south) and 68N (north) westbound
Suffolk	Manorville	64.05	103.08	69	Wading River Road (CR 25) – Wading River, Center Moriches	
Suffolk	Manorville	65.25	105.01	70	CR 111 south – Manorville, Eastport	Northern terminus of CR 111
Suffolk	Manorville–Calverton line	69.27	111.48	71	NY 24 south (CR 94) – Hampton Bays, Calverton	Eastbound exit and westbound entrance; northern terminus of NY 24
Suffolk	Calverton	70.75	113.86	72	NY 25 (Middle Country Road) – Riverhead, Calverton	Eastbound exit and westbound entrance
Suffolk	Calverton	71.02	114.30	73	CR 58 east (Old Country Road) – Greenport, Orient	Eastern terminus
1.000 mi = 1.609 km; 1.000 km = 0.621 mi: Closed/former; Electronic toll collection; HOV only; Incomplete access

=== Mid-Manhattan Expressway (canceled) ===
If built, the MME would have had the following exits:

mi	km	Destinations	Notes
0.00	0.00	I-495 west (Lincoln Tunnel)	Continuation into New Jersey
0.20	0.32	NY 9A (West Side Elevated Highway)	
0.40	0.64	6th Avenue – Times Square / Madison Square Park	
1.50	2.41	FDR Drive	
1.65	2.66	I-495 east (Queens–Midtown Tunnel)	Continuation into Queens
1.000 mi = 1.609 km; 1.000 km = 0.621 mi: Incomplete access; Tolled

== See also ==
- 495 Productions – Reality show production company named for the highway
- L.I.E. – 2001 film whose title is based on the initials of the highway
