= Faiella (surname) =

Faiella is a surname. Notable people with the name include:

- Anthony Faiella, American murder victim
- Benny Faiella, member of American rock band The Jaggerz
- Federica Faiella, Italian former competitive ice dancer
- Giuseppe Faiella, known professionally as Peppino di Capri, Italian popular music singer, songwriter, and pianist
- Sebastian Faiella, American model and stylist
