= Christopher Macchio =

American tenor

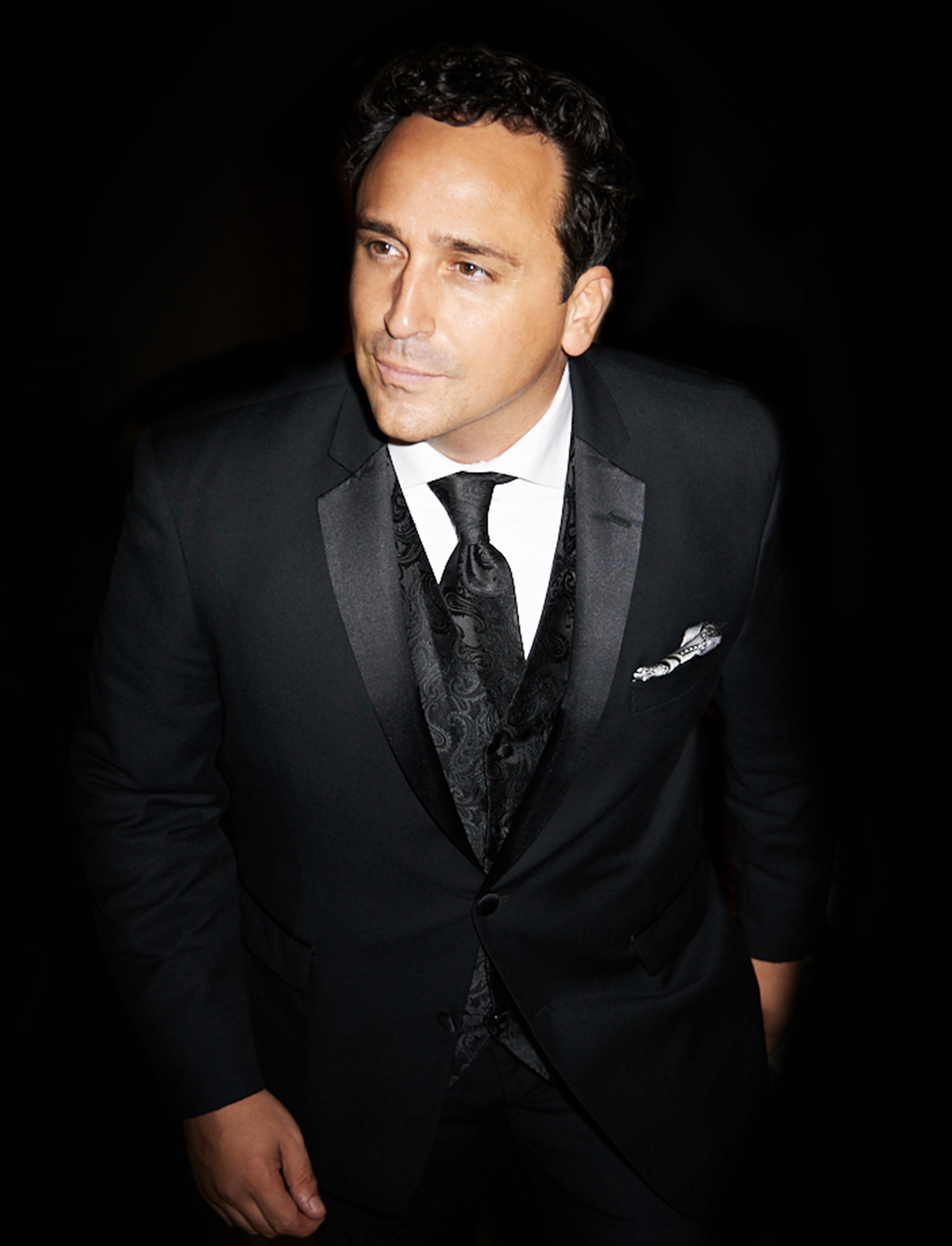
- Macchio's official headshot
- Born: Christopher Dennis Macchio; August 1, 1978 (age 48); Holbrook, New York, U.S.
- Education: Stony Brook University (BA)
- Occupation: Opera singer

Christopher Dennis Macchio (born August 1, 1978) is an American tenor who specializes in classical crossover music. He is a member of New York Tenors and has released two studio albums, Dolci Momenti (Sweet Moments) and a Christmas album O Holy Night.

== Early life and education ==
Macchio was born on August 1, 1978, to an Italian-American family in Holbrook, on Long Island, New York. His father, Dennis Macchio, owned and operated an economics forecasting firm, was an adjunct economics professor at Long Island University at C.W. Post, and later became a professional racecar driver, eventually owning and operating a series of respected racing schools across the United States. His mother, Lorraine Macchio (née Lawrence), was a homemaker and later worked at a local bank. As a student, his singing voice was discovered in his Sachem High School chorus, a class in which he had enrolled to meet a state graduation requirement. Encouraged by his chorus teacher, he shifted his focus from academic pursuits to music.

He spent the next two summers at the USDAN Summer Camp for the Arts, through which he was offered private vocal instruction by New York University adjunct voice professor and Holocaust survivor John Kuhn. He then trained in classical vocal performance at the Manhattan School of Music under Metropolitan Opera baritone Theodor Uppman. In 2007, he earned a B.A. in European History from Stony Brook University.

== Career ==
In 2010, Macchio signed with EMI Records. In 2011, he performed in a related PBS concert special entitled "Bell'Aria: Live From Las Vegas", followed by television appearances on Fox, ABC, NBC, and Rai Italia. In 2024, he made his Hollywood film debut as "Giovanni the singer" in the biopic "Cabrini" by director Alejandro Monteverde, followed by an appearance singing in mafia comedy "Don Q", starring Armand Assante.

He performs both as a solo artist and as a member of the New York Tenors, touring internationally. His concert appearances have included sold-out performances at New York's Carnegie Hall and Lincoln Center, Atlantic City, Philadelphia, Miami, Dallas, San Francisco and Los Angeles, as well as cities across Latin America, Europe and the Middle East. He regularly appears at charitable events and galas, including for Tunnel To Towers, and a 2017 performance on stage with music producer David Foster for Muhammad Ali's "Celebrity Fight Night". At the 2020 Republican National Convention, Macchio performed "Nessun Dorma", "Hallelujah", "Ave Maria", "God Bless America", and "America the Beautiful". During the 2024 United States presidential election, Macchio performed at the 2024 Republican National Convention, Donald Trump's return rally at Butler, Pennsylvania, his Madison Square Garden rally, and "The Star-Spangled Banner" at the second inauguration of Donald Trump in January 2025 making him the first male singer since 2005 to perform the anthem at the ceremony. Macchio performed at the Freedom 250 rally in Washington, DC, on June 24, 2026. This event celebrated America's 250th anniversary and was hosted by President Trump, featuring Lee Greenwood as well. Macchio performed the Leonard Cohen song "Hallelujah" at the event despite condemnation and objection by the estate of the songwriter.

== Artistry ==
Macchio specializes in classical crossover music, combining elements of opera with modern styles. He performs in multiple languages, including Italian, French, German, Spanish, Portuguese, Farsi, Hindi, Russian, Turkish, Hebrew, and Arabic. His concerts feature both classical and contemporary works.

== Discography ==
Macchio has released two studio albums: Dolci Momenti (Sweet Moments) and a Christmas album entitled O Holy Night. His recordings reflect a fusion of classical and modern musical influences.
