= Karen Ferguson-Dayes =

American soccer player and coach (born 1972)

Personal information
- Full name: Karen Elizabeth Dayes
- Birth name: Karen Elizabeth Ferguson
- Date of birth: February 13, 1972 (age 54)
- Place of birth: Holbrook, New York, U.S.
- Height: 5 ft 5 in (1.65 m)
- Positions: Sweeper; midfielder

Youth career
- –1990: Sachem North Flaming Arrows Boys

College career
Years	Team	Apps	(Gls)
1990–1993	Connecticut Huskies	89	(17)

Senior career*
Years	Team	Apps	(Gls)
1998–1999	Boston Renegades		

International career
1992–1993	United States	2	(0)

Managerial career
- 1995–1996: Boston University Terriers (assistant)
- 1997–1999: Connecticut Huskies (assistant)
- 2000–2025: Louisville Cardinals
- 2003–2004: United States U21 (assistant)
- 2005: United States U15 (assistant)
- * Club domestic league appearances and goals

Karen Elizabeth Dayes (née Ferguson; February 13, 1972) is an American former soccer player and coach who played as a sweeper or midfielder, making two appearances for the United States women's national team.

== Career ==
Ferguson-Dayes played for the Sachem North Flaming Arrows boys' team in high school. In college, she played for the Connecticut Huskies from 1990 to 1993. She was an All-American in 1991, 1992, and 1993, and was included in the NCAA All-Tournament Team in 1990. She was a Soccer America MVP in 1992, and was included on the ISAA National Senior Recognition Team in 1993. Ferguson-Dayes was included in the NSCAA All-Northeast Region in 1991, 1992, and 1993, as well as the NEWISA All-New England in all four seasons. In 1994, she won the school's Outstanding Senior Athlete Award. In total, she scored 17 goals and recorded 17 assists in 89 appearances for the Huskies.

Ferguson-Dayes made her international debut for the United States on August 14, 1992, in a friendly match against Norway. She earned her second and final cap for the U.S. on March 14, 1993, in a friendly match against Germany.

She played for the Boston Renegades of the USL W-League in 1998 and 1999. Ferguson-Dayes later began coaching, working as an assistant for the Boston University Terriers and the Connecticut Huskies, her alma mater. In 2000, she was appointed as the head coach of the Louisville Cardinals women's soccer. She is the most successful coach in program history, and was selected as the Big East Coach of the Year in 2011. While at Louisville, she also served as the assistant for the U.S. under-21 national team in 2003 and 2004, as well as the under-15 national team in 2005. She has also served as the coach of various regional youth selections and training programs, and holds a U.S. Soccer 'B' license. She was inducted into the Sachem Athletic Hall of Fame in 2003, as well as the New York State High School Girls Soccer Hall of Fame in 2018.

== Personal life ==
Ferguson-Dayes is a native of Holbrook, New York, and was married to Hylton Dayes in 2008. She gave birth to a son, Brandon, in December 2008.

== Career statistics ==
=== International ===
United States
Year	Apps	Goals
1992	1	0
1993	1	0
Total	2	0
