= Jumbo Elliott (American football) =

American football player (born 1965)

John Elliott
No. 76
- Position: Offensive tackle

Personal information
- Born: April 1, 1965 (age 61); Lake Ronkonkoma, New York, U.S.
- Listed height: 6 ft 7 in (2.01 m)
- Listed weight: 308 lb (140 kg)

Career information
- High school: Sachem (NY)
- College: Michigan
- NFL draft: 1988: 2nd round, 36th overall pick

Career history
- New York Giants (1988–1995); New York Jets (1996–2000; 2002)

Awards and highlights
- Super Bowl champion (XXV); Pro Bowl (1993); PFWA All-Rookie Team (1988); 60th greatest New York Giant of all-time; Consensus All-American (1987); First-team All-American (1986); 2× First-team All-Big Ten (1986, 1987)

Career NFL statistics
- Games played: 197
- Games started: 156
- Fumble recoveries: 1
- Stats at Pro Football Reference
- College Football Hall of Fame

John Stuart "Jumbo" Elliott (born April 1, 1965) is an American former professional football player who was an offensive tackle for 14 years in the National Football League (NFL) with the New York Giants from 1988 to 1995 and the New York Jets from 1996 to 2000 and 2002. He appeared in 197 NFL games, including 156 as a starter. He was a key player on the 1990 New York Giants team that won Super Bowl XXV, received All-Madden honors in 1990 and 1991, and was selected to play in the 1993 Pro Bowl. His signature moment came in October 2000 when he caught the game-tying touchdown pass in the game known as the "Monday Night Miracle" that served as his first and only touchdown as a football player.

Elliott played college football as an offensive tackle for the Michigan Wolverines from 1984 to 1987. He started 45 games for Michigan and was twice selected as a first-team All-American, receiving those honors in 1986 and 1987. He was a consensus All-American in 1987. He was the starting left tackle on the 1985 Wolverines team that compiled a 10–1–1 record, outscored opponents 342–98, and was ranked #2 in the final AP Poll.

== Early life ==
Elliott was born in Lake Ronkonkoma, New York, in 1965. He attended Sachem High School on Long Island. He played football at Sachem High School, was selected to the New York Daily News all-star team, had his number retired by the school in 1989, and was inducted into the Sachem Athletic Hall of Fame in 2003.

== University of Michigan ==
Elliott enrolled at the University of Michigan in 1983 as a six-foot, seven-inch, 280-pound freshman. He played college football as an offensive tackle for head coach Bo Schembechler's Michigan Wolverines football teams from 1984 to 1987, growing to 306 pounds by his junior year. He was a four-year starter on Michigan's offensive line, starting 10 games at left tackle in 1984, 11 games at left tackle in 1985, 12 games at right tackle in 1986, and 12 games at right tackle in 1987. The 1985 Michigan team compiled a 10–1–1 record, outscored opponents 342–98, and was ranked #2 in the final AP Poll.

He became known for his dominant blocking, recording 11.5 pancake blocks in two games early in the 1986 season. He was selected a first-team offensive tackle on both the 1986 and 1987 College Football All-America Teams. In 1987, he was a consensus All-American, receiving first-team honors from the United Press International, Walter Camp Football Foundation, American Football Coaches Association, and Football Writers Association of America.

== Professional career ==
=== New York Giants ===
Elliott was selected by the New York Giants in the second round (36th overall pick) of the 1988 NFL draft. He spent eight seasons with the Giants from 1988 to 1995. He appeared in 112 game for the Giants, 98 of them as the team's starting left tackle. Elliott missed eight games to injury in the middle of the 1990 season, with the team averaging 149.9 rushing yards with him and 111.8 rushing yards without him. With Elliott back in the lineup, the 1990 Giants went on to defeat the Buffalo Bills in Super Bowl XXV. Elliott's work against Buffalo defensive end Bruce Smith, enabling the Giants to rush for 172 yards, has been described as "one of the unnoticed keys to the Giants' 1991 Super Bowl victory." He received All-Madden honors in 1990 and 1991. He was also selected to play in the 1993 Pro Bowl, but did not play due to a back injury.

=== New York Jets ===
In February 1996, Elliott had become a free agent and signed a five-year contract with the New York Jets that was reportedly worth between $15 million and $16 million. He appeared in 85 games for the Jets, 58 of them as the Jets' starting left tackle, from 1996 to 2000 and again in 2002. Elliott helped turn the Jets around, from a 1–15 finish in 1996 to the AFC Championship Game in 1998.

Elliott's "signature moment" occurred in a Monday Night Football game on October 23, 2000. Late in the fourth quarter, the Jets were down by seven points to the Miami Dolphins when Elliott caught his only career pass, thrown by Vinny Testaverde, for a touchdown to tie the game 37–37. This play marked the end of the Jets' comeback from being down by 23 points in the fourth quarter. The Jets won 40–37 in overtime. The game has become known as the "Monday Night Miracle".

Elliott was released by the Jets in July 2001, and did not play during the 2001 NFL season. He made a comeback the following year and appeared in 16 games, none as a starter, during the 2002 season.

In 14 NFL seasons, Elliott appeared in 197 games, including 156 as a starter at left tackle.

== Later life ==
After retiring from football, Elliott returned to Long Island. He was inducted into the Suffolk Sports Hall of Fame in the Football Category with the Class of 1993.

In 2004, he entered a development deal to open three Dunkin' Donuts shops. As of 2010, he owned two Dunkin' Donuts shops near his home on Long Island.

Elliott was inducted into the College Football Hall of Fame in 2020.
