= Dalton Crossan =

American gridiron football player (born 1994)

No. 42, 44, 30
- Position: Running back

Personal information
- Born: February 25, 1994 (age 32); Stony Brook, New York, U.S.
- Listed height: 5 ft 11 in (1.80 m)
- Listed weight: 203 lb (92 kg)

Career information
- High school: Sachem North (Lake Ronkonkoma, New York)
- College: New Hampshire (2012–2016)
- NFL draft: 2017: undrafted

Career history
- Indianapolis Colts (2017)*; Tampa Bay Buccaneers (2018)*; Ottawa Redblacks (2019)*
- * Offseason or practice squad member only
- Stats at Pro Football Reference

Dalton Crossan (born February 25, 1994) is an American former football running back. He played college football at New Hampshire. After going undrafted in the 2017 NFL draft, he signed with the Indianapolis Colts of the National Football League (NFL). He also played for the Tampa Bay Buccaneers and the Ottawa Redblacks of the Canadian Football League (CFL).

== Early life and college career ==
Crossan began his athletic career at Shoreham-Wading River High School in Shoreham, New York. He later attended Sachem High School North in Lake Ronkonkoma, New York. He received the Hansen Award as the best player on Long Island. He also played lacrosse and received offers to play lacrosse at Notre Dame and the University of Michigan.

Crossan played college football at New Hampshire from 2012 to 2016. He appeared in 44 games and totaled 5,189 all-purpose yards, including 2,617 rushing yards, 779 receiving yards, and 1,793 kick return yards. In 2016, he rushed for 1,281 yards and 10 touchdowns and totaled 1,977 all-purpose yards.

== Professional career ==
=== Indianapolis Colts ===
Crossan was signed by the Indianapolis Colts as an undrafted free agent on May 4, 2017. He was waived/injured by the Colts on August 15, 2017 and was placed on injured reserve. He was released on August 22, 2017.

=== Tampa Bay Buccaneers ===
On February 22, 2018, Crossan was signed by the Tampa Bay Buccaneers. He was waived/injured on August 2, 2018 and placed on injured reserve. He was released on August 10, 2018.

=== Ottawa Redblack ===
On January 18, 2019, Crossan signed with the Ottawa Redblacks of the Canadian Football League (CFL).
