= Sachem High School North =

Location
- 212 Smith Road; Lake Ronkonkoma, New York 11779; United States; 40°50′21″N 73°06′06″W

Information
- Type: Public high school
- Established: 1969
- School district: Sachem Central School District
- Principal: Patrick Burke
- Teaching staff: 162.75 (FTE)
- Grades: 9-12
- Enrollment: 2,008 (2024-2025)
- Student to teacher ratio: 12.34
- Colors: Black and gold
- Nickname: Flaming Arrows
- Website: shsnorth.sachem.edu

Sachem High School North is a public high school in Lake Ronkonkoma, New York, United States. Along with Sachem High School East, it is one of the two high schools in the Sachem Central School District.

== History ==
The school was established in 1969, but didn't open officially until 1970. Sachem High School South also opened that same year, which later closed and was rebranded as Samoset Middle School.

== Clubs ==
Clubs offered at SHSN:

• Buddies

• DECA

• Drama

• Gamers

• Interact

• Mentor

• Freshman

• Sophomore

• Junior

• Senior

• U.S First Robotics

• Yearbook

• Skills USA

• Special Olympics

• Student Government

• The Alliance

• History Honor Society

• Business & Marketing Honor Society

• World Language Honor Society

• National Honor Society

• National Art Honor Society

• National English Honor Society

• National Math Honor Society

• National Science Honor Society

• National Technical Honor Society

• Tri-M (Music Honor Society)

• Music Council

== Academics ==
Sachem North offers many of the Advanced Placement programs offered by the College Board, as well as many honors courses. It offers Spanish, French and Italian as foreign languages that can be taken. The school also offers classes in culinary arts, engineering, 3D printing, and cosmetology (which upon completion grants the student a cosmetology license). Sachem North has partnered with Eastern Suffolk BOCES to allow students to take courses through BOCES.

== Notable alumni ==
- Jon Bellion, singer, rapper, songwriter, and record producer
- Dalton Crossan, former NFL running back for the Indianapolis Colts and the Tampa Bay Buccaneers
- Karen Ferguson-Dayes, soccer player
- Captain Kirk Douglas – Guitarist and singer
- Christopher Macchio, opera singer
- Joe Scally, soccer player
