= Lake Ronkonkoma (lake) =

Lake in New York, United States

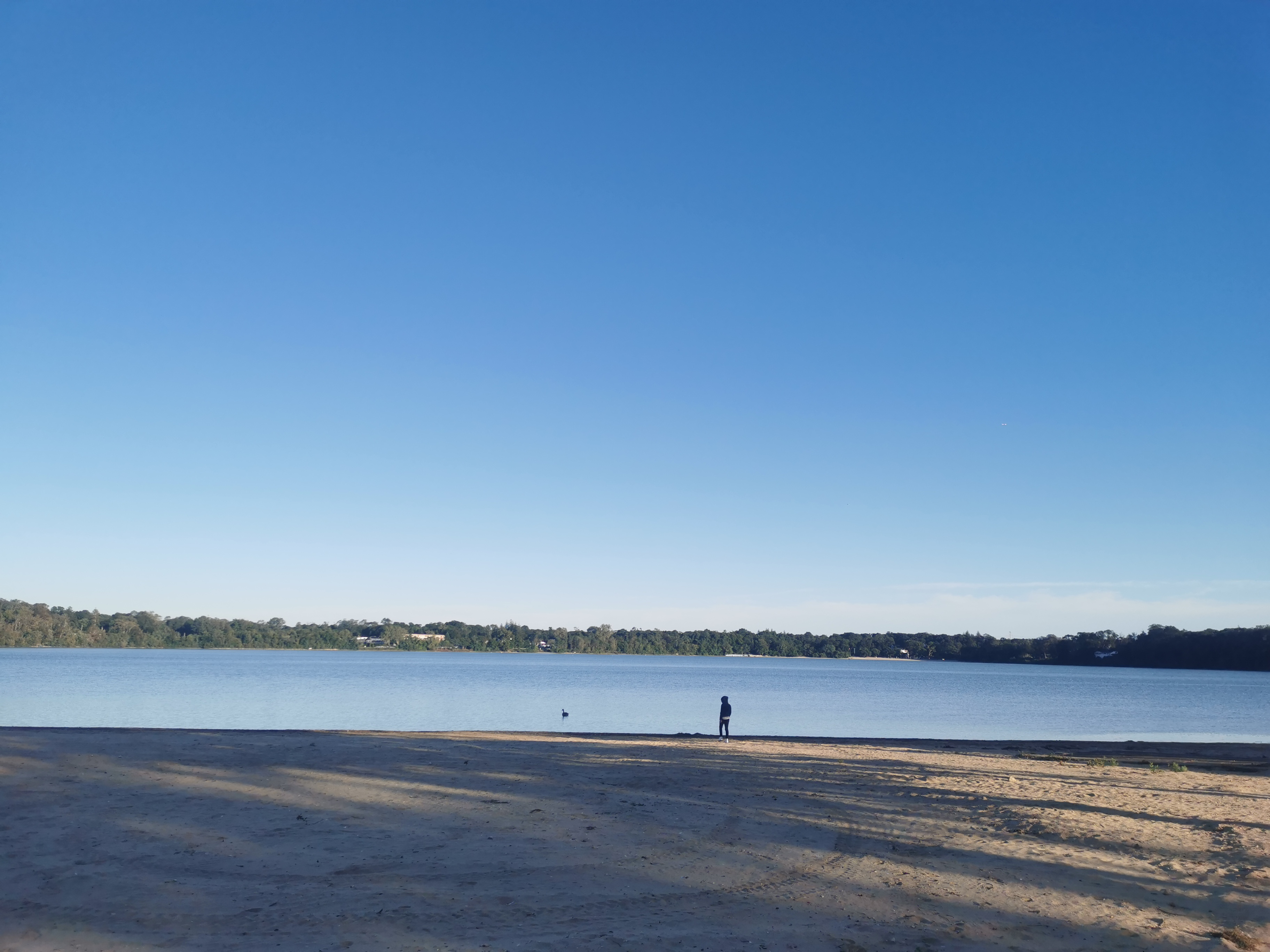

- Location within Long Island Location within New York Location within the United States
- Location: Suffolk County, New York, United States
- Coordinates: 40°49′42″N 073°07′18″W
- Type: kettle lake
- Primary inflows: groundwater
- Primary outflows: underground
- Basin countries: United States
- Surface area: 243 acres (0.98 km^{2})
- Max. depth: 95 ft (29 m)
- Surface elevation: 52 ft (16 m)

Lake Ronkonkoma is a freshwater lake in Suffolk County, New York. It is a kettle lake formed by retreating glaciers and is the largest freshwater lake on Long Island; it has a circumference of about 2 miles (3.2 km) and is 0.65 miles (1.05 km) across on average. The lake is owned by the Town of Islip under the terms of the Nicolls Patent. The land around it is controlled by three town governments – Smithtown, Islip and Brookhaven. The separation originated because three different Native American communities claimed lands on different shores, and these claims continued when the tribes gave separate deeds to the land under their control. The name Ronkonkoma comes from an Algonquian expression meaning "boundary fishing-lake", also earlier written as Raconkumake and Raconkamuck.

== Beginnings ==
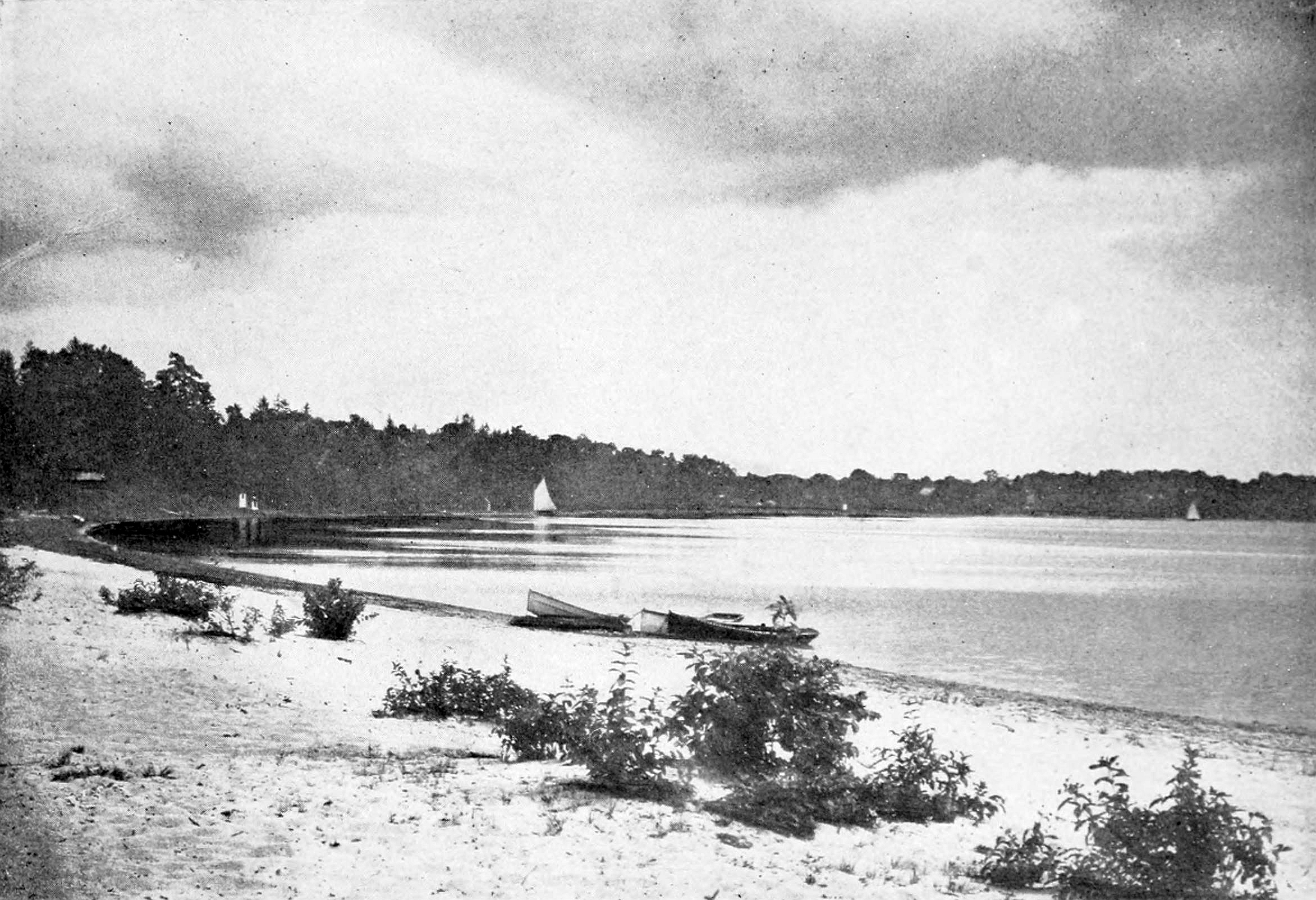
North beach, 1901

Smithtown founder Richard Smith's original holdings included the headwaters of the Nissequogue River east to a "freshwater pond called Raconkamuck," which translates as "the boundary fishing place" in the Algonquian language. What is now known as Lake Ronkonkoma served as a boundary between lands occupied by four Native American communities: Nissequogues, Setaukets, Secatogues and Unkechaugs.

The Smithtown side of Lake Ronkonkoma was settled by the 1740s, but it was not until the late 1890s that the area gained widespread public attention. That's when boarding houses and hotels were erected to accommodate a growing number of tourists drawn by claims that the lake's waters had special healing powers. By the 1920s, beach pavilions had sprung up. The Long Island Rail Road, which was completed to nearby Lakeland in 1842 (the depot was moved to Ronkonkoma in 1883), helped transform what had been a sleepy farming hamlet.

The lake was created by a retreating glacier. Portions of its irregular basin are unusually deep for Long Island, but most of the lake is less than 15 feet (4.6 m) deep. As a rule of thumb, it is unproductive to fish deeper than 15 feet (4.6 m) in Lake Ronkonkoma because there is seldom enough dissolved oxygen to sustain fish beyond this depth. The primary gamefish are largemouth and smallmouth bass.

Lake Ronkonkoma holds large bass but locating them is a challenge due to the scarcity of natural structure to attract these fish. Chain pickerel are extremely rare. In the last two decades, white perch and yellow perch populations have increased to the point of upsetting the ecological balance of the lake.

=== Species of fish in Lake Ronkonkoma ===
- Largemouth bass
- Smallmouth bass
- Bluegill
- Pumpkinseed
- Black crappie
- Yellow perch
- White perch
- Tiger muskellunge
- Carp
- Brown bullhead
- Walleye
- Chain pickerel

There have been unsubstantiated rumors of piranha being caught in the lake over the past two decades. The idea that schools of piranha are present in the depths of Lake Ronkonkoma is unfounded and highly unlikely, as there undoubtedly would have been more attacks on bathers and more evidence of devoured fish. Actual specimens "caught" in the lake (or at least presented by people in a glass jar in the mid-1990s) have been either proven to have not come from the lake, or have been pacu, a different introduced species that looks very similar but is harmless to humans. Bites that have been reported on feet and the lower body in shallow water are likely to have been caused by the various turtle species which inhabit the lake.

== Summer resort ==
Lake Ronkonkoma was a popular Long Island summer resort in the late 19th and early 20th centuries. There were a few boarding houses in town. One of the hotels on the lake was the Lake Front Hotel situated on twenty-four acres of land on the lake's shore. Most of the original settlers and local residents chose to live away from the lakefront. The land one half mile or so beyond the lake was flatter and better suited for farming. Little by little, the lakefront developed into a fashionable haven for the wealthier people who had summer estates there.

In 1911, the Long Island Motor Parkway was completed from Queens to Lake Ronkonkoma. Traveling the winding Motor Parkway to reach the lake in those days was an adventure in itself.

Lake Ronkonkoma became an exclusive summer enclave for the wealthy and famous from New York City. All summer long there was boating and swimming at the lake. While the area's population peaked during the summers, fall activities such as hunting were also popular, although hunting activity began to decline in the 1930s. During the winters, skating parties were often arranged. A favorite game on the ice was Crack the Whip.

The perimeter of the lake itself began to change from residential to commercial usage. As the lake front became less exclusive, many longtime residents began to leave the area. In the 1950s, the original owners began to sell their beaches to others. George Raynor, whose family had lived at the lake since the 1840s, owned a parcel of land which later became Raynor Beach. Many of the beach front pavilions, which were left unattended, burned down. On October 4, 1962, Brookhaven Town purchased land for the first town-owned beach on the lake. The unattended sections of beaches began to deteriorate. Rubbish, tin cans and bottles lined the shores in many places. Since the shoreline lay in between three townships, no single entity was willing to take responsibility. A Tri-Town Committee for the Preservation of Lake Ronkonkoma has been formed. The committee has agreed that the three towns would treat the pollution problems as a single problem, affecting all local residents.

== In popular culture ==
Local folklore attributes many drownings in the lake to an alleged Native American spirit residing in the water. Local artisans have created murals and a statue to celebrate the legend. Five people have drowned in the lake since 1995, as far back as Suffolk County Police Department records go. The chair of the local historic commission says she has documented 126 lake deaths from the late 1700s through 2022, and a longtime lifeguard's book counts 160 drownings mostly from the 1800s through 1970.
