= Marc Sebastian =

American model and stylist

- Born: Marc Sebastian Faiella; November 1, 1990 (age 36); Holbrook, Long Island, New York
- Education: Parsons School of Design and Fashion Institute of Technology
- Occupations: Model, Stylist, Activist
- Organization: Voices4
- Agent: IMG Models
- Height: 6 ft 1 in (185 cm)

TikTok information
- Page: Marc Sebastian
- Followers: 2.5 million
- Last updated: 2024-01-25

Marc Sebastian Faiella (born November 1, 1990) is an American model and stylist. He was born on Long Island, New York and is represented by IMG. Faiella is also a co-founder of Voices4, a nonviolent activist group focused on helping those affected by LGBTQ+ hate crimes throughout the world.

== Personal life ==
Faiella was born in Long Island, New York. Faiella graduated from Sachem East High School in 2008. After high school, Faiella attended the Fashion Institute of Technology (F.I.T.) in New York. He then graduated from Parsons School of Design with a focus on womenswear, while also beginning his career in modelling.

== Career ==
=== Modeling ===
As a Model, Faiella was discovered while interning at Kenzo in Paris. Faiella was first signed with FM and made his debut during Paris Fashion Week in June 2012. Faiella's career took off when he walked during the Balenciaga Spring 2013 show. In the fall of 2013 Faiella walked for Kenzo, Yves Saint Laurent, Rag & Bone and Siki Im. Faiella's participation in these shows helped cement his role in the fashion industry as he continued to walk for various designers including Sandro, Todd Lynn, J.W. Anderson, Xander Zhou, Haider Ackermann, Louis Vuitton and Paul Smith through 2016. In Spring of 2017 Faiella opened the show for Palomo Spain. In 2018 Faiella directed a documentary titled Palomo that gives a behind the scenes look of preparations for the Palomo runway show.

=== Styling ===
Faiella was recruited as a stylist to help revitalize the look of singer Troye Sivan for the Australian/New Zealand leg of Sivan's Bloom Tour. Since then, Faiella has exclusively styled Sivan for a variety of events including for Elton John's Oscar Viewing Party in February 2020. Faiella also styled Sivan for the 2020 release of his third upcoming album, beginning with the release of Sivan's single, Take Yourself Home.

=== Social media ===
Faiella has amassed over 2.4 million followers on TikTok. In late 2023, Faiella was sponsored by Atria Books to join the Ultimate World Cruise for it leg through the Drake Passage and report about gossip on the ship. The nine month long cruise by Royal Caribbean had attracted substantial attention on social media, particularly TikTok, since it launch on 10 December 2023. The unusual sponsorship arrangement received attention from the advertising industry, with marketing executive Brendan Gahan stating "Marc and Atria have created a campaign that will undoubtedly spark copycats in years to come." Videos surrounding the Ultimate World Cruise have so far received more than 500 million views on TikTok.

== Activism ==
In 2017, along with influencer and activist, Adam Eli Werner, Faiella co-founded Voices4 with a focus on supporting the LGBTQ+ community worldwide. Faiella has also been outspoken concerning homophobia in the fashion industry. He is also an advocate for the protection of Pangolins.
