= Sachem High School East =

School in New York, US

Location
- 177 Granny Road; Farmingville, New York 11738; United States; 40°50′42″N 73°00′40″W

Information
- Type: Public high school
- Motto: We are Sachem
- Established: 2004
- School district: Sachem School District
- Principal: Lou Antonetti
- Teaching staff: 162.75 (FTE)
- Grades: 9-12
- Enrollment: 2,008 (2024-2025)
- Student to teacher ratio: 12.34
- Color
- Nickname: Arrows
- Website: shseast.sachem.edu

Sachem High School East is a public secondary school located in Farmingville, New York, United States. Along with Sachem High School North, it is one of the two high schools in the Sachem Central School District.

== History ==
The school was founded in 2004, populated by students from the former Sachem High School South, which closed and was rebranded to Samoset Middle School.

== Athletics ==
A number of teams have won national, state, or regional championships. These include:

- Varsity Field Hockey-Long Island Champions 2014, 2018
- Varsity Cheerleading-National Title 2016
- Girls' Varsity Basketball-NYS Champion 2010

== Academics ==
Sachem East offers many of the Advanced Placement programs offered by the College Board, as well as many honors courses. It offers Spanish, French and Italian as foreign languages that can be taken. The school also offers classes in culinary arts, engineering, 3D printing, and cosmetology (which upon completion grants the student a cosmetology license). Sachem East has partnered with Eastern Suffolk BOCES to allow students to take courses through BOCES.

== Demographics ==
Gender 2015-2016
Gender	Students	Percent
Female	1,194	50.4%
Male	1,173	49.6%
Total	2,367	100%

Race 2015-2016
Race	Students	Percent
American Indian or Alaska Native	5	0.21%
Asian/Hawaiian/other Pacific Islander	136	5.7%
Black or African American	44	1.9%
Hispanic/Latino	211	8.9%
White	1958	82.7%
Multiracial	13	0.55%
Total	2367	100%

== Notable alumni ==
- Keith Kinkaid – NHL goalie for the New York Rangers
- Jeff Ruland – former NBA player with the Washington Bullets and coach of Iona University Gaels men's basketball team
- Marc Sebastian – fashion model, stylist, and activist
- Skylar Spence – musician
