= Lake Ronkonkoma, New York =

- Hamlet and census-designated place
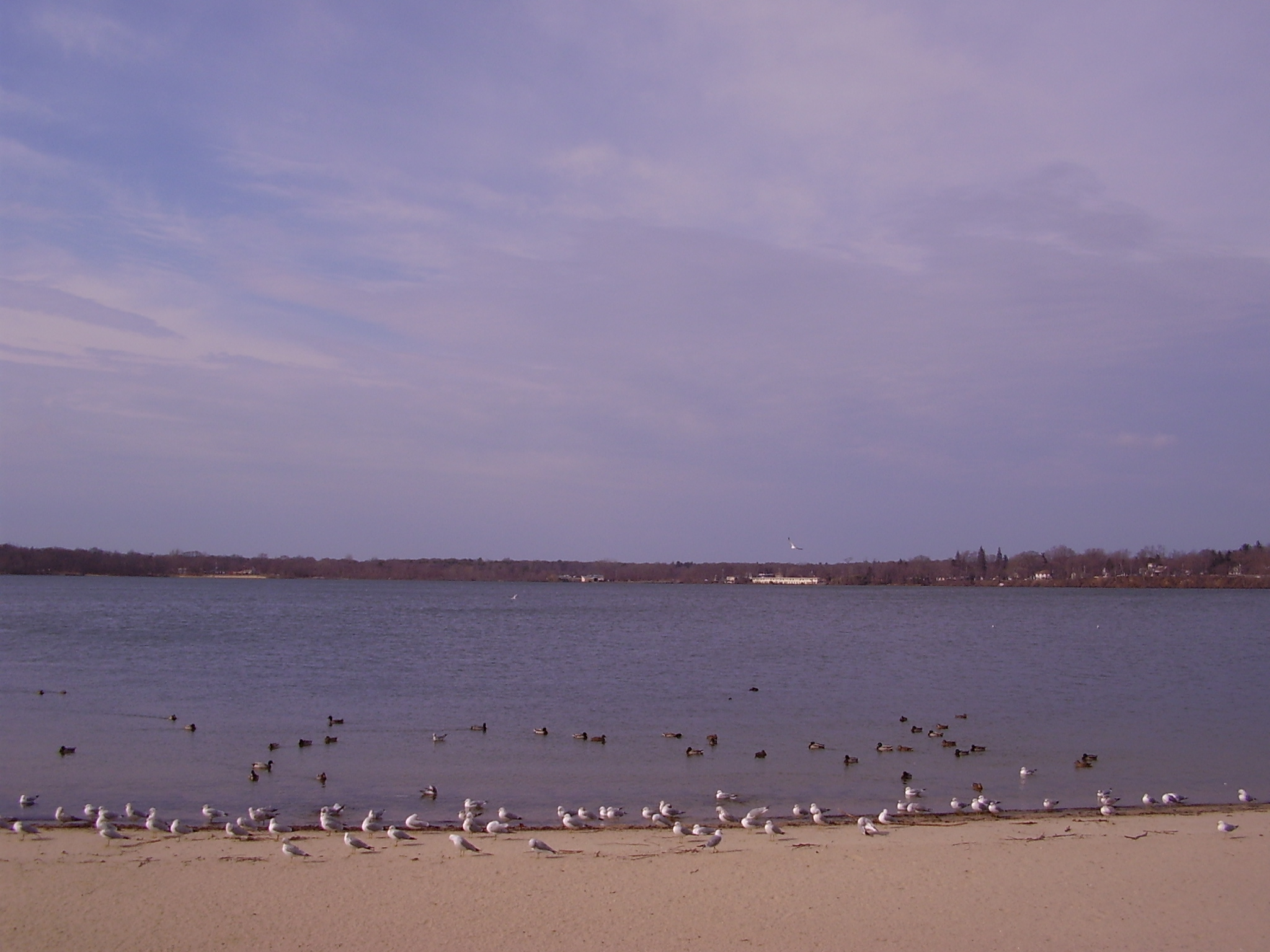
- Lake Ronkonkoma – the lake for which the community was named

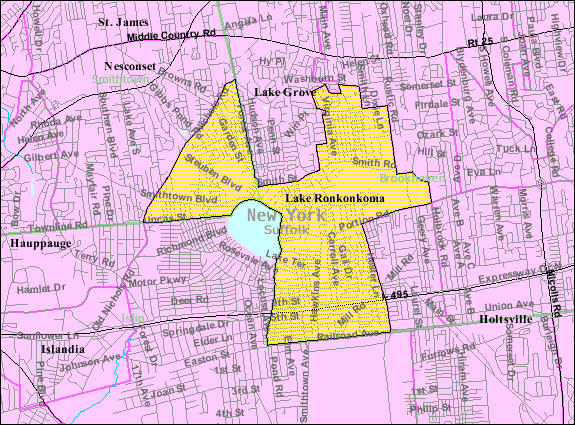
- U.S. Census map

- Location on Long Island Location within the state of New York
- Coordinates: 40°49′47″N 73°6′47″W
- Country: United States
- State: New York
- County: Suffolk
- Towns: Brookhaven; Smithtown
- Named after: Lake Ronkonkoma

Area
  - Total: 4.54 sq mi (11.76 km^{2})
  - Land: 4.54 sq mi (11.75 km^{2})
  - Water: 0.0039 sq mi (0.01 km^{2})
- Elevation: 72 ft (22 m)

Population (2020)
  - Total: 18,619
  - Density: 4,104.3/sq mi (1,584.67/km^{2})
- Time zone: UTC–5 (Eastern (EST))
  - Summer (DST): UTC–4 (EDT)
- ZIP Code: 11779
- Area codes: 631, 934
- FIPS code: 36-40838
- GNIS feature ID: 0954936

Lake Ronkonkoma is a hamlet and census-designated place (CDP) in Suffolk County, on Long Island, in New York, United States. The population was 18,619 at the time of the 2020 census.

Located on the north and east sides of the eponymous lake, Lake Ronkonkoma is mainly located within the Town of Brookhaven, with the northwestern section being located within the Town of Smithtown.

== History ==
The actual lake, Lake Ronkonkoma, adjacent to the CDP, is the largest lake on Long Island. The land surrounding one side of the lake is in the jurisdiction of the Town of Islip. The elevation of the lake surface is given as 55 feet (17 m) on the most recent USGS map, but as the lake is a "groundwater lake", not fed by streams, it has no surface outlet and its water surface reflects the current level of the local water table. This can undergo significant changes over time, and the lake level experiences slow periods of rise and fall. In the late 1960s it was quite low; after several intermediate changes in level, in 2007 the lake was higher than at any time since, with a difference of well over 5 feet (1.5 m) between the 1960s low and the 2007 high.

As a result of the lake's existence, Lake Ronkonkoma was once a resort town, until the area experienced a population explosion in the mid-20th century. Remnants of old resorts and hotels can still be seen around the lake's shores. Many summer cottages and bungalows from that period remain, now converted to year-round use.

The lake is the subject of a number of urban legends, mainly rooted in the area's rich Native American heritage. For example: 1. "It's bottomless" (and/or empties into Long Island Sound or other waterways). In fact, the lake is approximately 65 feet (20 m) deep at its southeastern side, and is hence known as a kettle hole lake. 2. "Every year the lake sacrifices someone." Or more specifically, Princess Ronkonkoma "The Lady of the Lake" calls young men out to the middle of the lake and drowns them. In all versions, the lady is an Indigenous princess who herself drowned in the lake, for reasons that vary depending on the story. The most popular version is that every year the lake claims one male victim. Articles suggest that in the past 200 years, only a handful of females have drowned in Lake Ronkonkoma. 3. "There is a mysterious rise and fall of the lake that doesn't have any noticeable relationship to local rainfall totals." This has not been sufficiently explained either way.

Unlike in adjacent Nassau County (then part of Queens County), the Native Americans in Suffolk County got along well with the White English. On Long Island's western, Dutch-owned end, the Dutchmen and the Native Americans experienced significant fighting.

There is some kernel of truth in the story. The lake was considered the most sacred lake by the Natives and it was also a meeting point. The tribes controlled different parts of it. One thing is certain, the Native American princess could not have lived in what is now Ronkonkoma; a major point of the story is that the princess and her lover ran off from their own settlement to the lake. In addition the Natives did not live anywhere near the lake. They lived near the coasts of Long Island.

In 2017, then-Governor Andrew M. Cuomo announced the groundbreaking of a major development project to create a "Ronkonkoma Hub" in the CDP, adjacent to the Ronkonkoma LIRR station and straddling the Lake Ronkonkoma–Ronkonkoma border (and, in turn, the Brookhaven–Islip town border); at the time of the announcement, the total cost of the project was estimated to be $650 million. This development project, now known as Station Yards, would spur economic development in the area. As of 2026, the total cost of the project is expected to be approximately $1.2 billion.

== Geography ==
According to the United States Census Bureau, the CDP has a total area of 4.9 square miles (13 km^{2}), all land.

== Demographics ==
Historical population
Census	Pop.	Note	%±
2000	19,701		—
2010	20,155		2.3%
2020	18,619		−7.6%
U.S. Decennial Census

=== 2020 census ===
As of the 2020 census, Lake Ronkonkoma had a population of 18,619. The median age was 42.9 years. 19.7% of residents were under the age of 18 and 17.3% of residents were 65 years of age or older. For every 100 females there were 94.7 males, and for every 100 females age 18 and over there were 94.3 males age 18 and over.

100.0% of residents lived in urban areas, while 0.0% lived in rural areas.

There were 6,645 households in Lake Ronkonkoma, of which 31.4% had children under the age of 18 living in them. Of all households, 52.0% were married-couple households, 16.8% were households with a male householder and no spouse or partner present, and 25.6% were households with a female householder and no spouse or partner present. About 24.7% of all households were made up of individuals and 12.7% had someone living alone who was 65 years of age or older.

There were 7,223 housing units, of which 8.0% were vacant. The homeowner vacancy rate was 0.7% and the rental vacancy rate was 16.9%.

Racial composition as of the 2020 census
Race	Number	Percent
White	14,255	76.6%
Black or African American	756	4.1%
American Indian and Alaska Native	45	0.2%
Asian	1,103	5.9%
Native Hawaiian and Other Pacific Islander	3	0.0%
Some other race	884	4.7%
Two or more races	1,573	8.4%
Hispanic or Latino (of any race)	2,588	13.9%

=== 2000 census ===
As of the 2000 census, there were 19,701 people, 6,700 households, and 5,011 families residing in the CDP. The population density was 4,093.1 inhabitants per square mile (1,580.4/km^{2}). There were 6,949 housing units at an average density of 1,814.4 per square mile (700.5/km^{2}). The racial makeup of the CDP was 89.4% White, 1.4% African American, 0.15% Native American, 2.41% Asian, 0.09% Pacific Islander, 1.3% from other races, and 1.27% from two or more races. Hispanic or Latino of any race were 5.9% of the population.

There were 6,700 households, out of which 35.6% had children under the age of 18 living with them, 59.8% were married couples living together, 10.9% had a female householder with no husband present, and 25.2% were non-families. 20.3% of all households were made up of individuals, and 9.7% had someone living alone who was 65 years of age or older. The average household size was 2.86 and the average family size was 3.32.

In the CDP, the population was spread out, with 24.7% under the age of 18, 7.4% from 18 to 24, 32.6% from 25 to 44, 23.2% from 45 to 64, and 12.2% who were 65 years of age or older. The median age was 37 years. For every 100 females, there were 93.5 males. For every 100 females age 18 and over, there were 90.3 males.

The median income for a household in the CDP was $60,209, and the median income for a family was $67,375. Males had a median income of $50,715 versus $34,301 for females. The per capita income for the CDP was $23,233. About 3.1% of families and 6.2% of the population were below the poverty line, including 3.8% of those under age 18 and 17.0% of those age 65 or over.

== Parks and recreation ==
The Lieutenant Michael P. Murphy Memorial Park – a beach and park owned and operated by the Town of Brookhaven – is located on the eastern side of Lake Ronkonkoma. It was renamed in honor of Navy SEAL Lieutenant Michael P. Murphy in 2006. Lt. Murphy was head lifeguard and beach manager of this park, during high school and summer recess from college.

== Education ==
Lake Ronkonkoma is primarily located within the boundaries of (and is thus served by) the Sachem Central School District. However, a smaller section of Lake Ronkonkoma (also known as South Centereach) is located within the boundaries of (and is thus served by) the Middle Country Central School District. As such, children who reside within the hamlet and attend public schools go to school in one of these districts, depending on where they live within Lake Ronkonkoma.

== Media ==
- WSHR

== Notable people ==
- Maude Adams (1872–1953), Broadway stage actress noted for her title role in Peter Pan
- Zoe Barnett (1883–1969), Broadway stage actress in musical comedies
- Laurie Colwin (1944–1992), author
- Jumbo Elliott (born 1965), National Football League player
- David E. Grange Jr. (1925–2022), U.S. Army Lieutenant General
- Dale Snodgrass (1949–2021), United States Navy avaiator and air show performer who was considered one of the greatest fighter pilots of all time.

== In popular culture ==
- Edith Bunker mentioned Lake Ronkonkoma in the "Archie is Jealous" episode of All in the Family.
- Two characters in the movie 200 Cigarettes are visiting New York City from Lake Ronkonkoma.
