= Steven Matz =

American baseball player (born 1991)

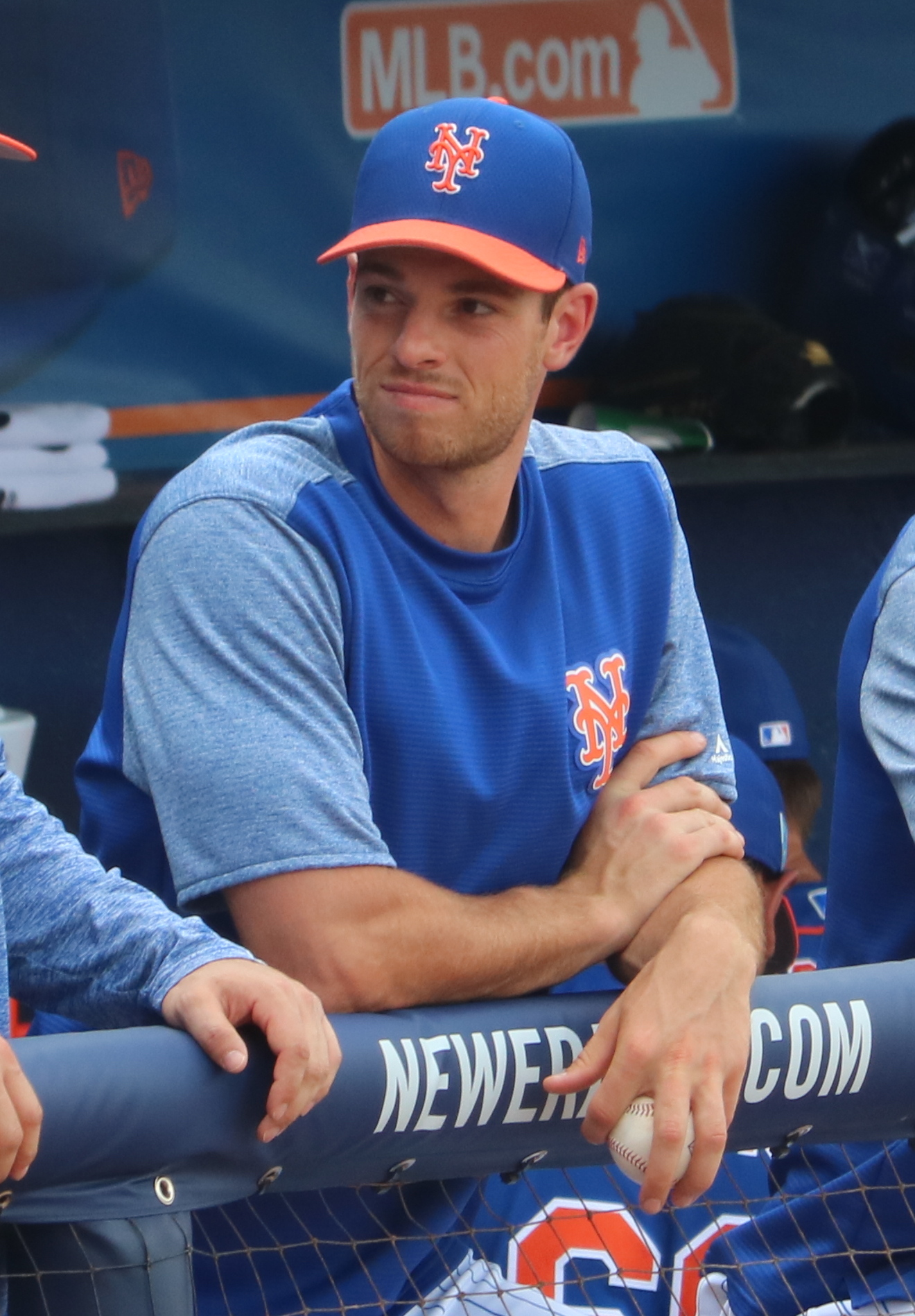
- Matz with the New York Mets in 2019

Tampa Bay Rays – No. 32
- Pitcher
- Born: May 29, 1991 (age 35); Stony Brook, New York, U.S.
- Bats: Right Throws: Left

MLB debut
- June 28, 2015, for the New York Mets

MLB statistics (through 2026 season)
- Win–loss record: 66–68
- Earned run average: 4.29
- Strikeouts: 1,001
- Stats at Baseball Reference

Teams
- New York Mets (2015–2020); Toronto Blue Jays (2021); St. Louis Cardinals (2022–2025); Boston Red Sox (2025); Tampa Bay Rays (2026–present)

Steven Jakob Matz (born May 29, 1991) is an American professional baseball pitcher for the Tampa Bay Rays of Major League Baseball (MLB). He has previously played in MLB for the New York Mets, Toronto Blue Jays, St. Louis Cardinals, and Boston Red Sox. Matz was born and raised on Long Island and played baseball for Ward Melville High School in East Setauket, New York. The Mets drafted him directly out of high school in the second round of the 2009 MLB draft, with the 72nd overall selection.

The start of Matz's professional career was delayed two years due to Tommy John surgery needed for a tear in the ulnar collateral ligament of his throwing elbow. Matz made his professional debut in 2012 and spent three years in the Mets' minor leagues, helping lead the Savannah Sand Gnats and Binghamton Mets to championships. He was named the Mets' Organizational Pitcher of the Year in 2014. He made his MLB debut on June 28, 2015, breaking several hitting records in his first start.

After compiling a 4–0 win–loss record and a 2.27 ERA in an injury-shortened regular season, Matz played in three 2015 postseason games, including Game 4 of the World Series against the Kansas City Royals. Matz opened 2016 with a 7–1 record and led all rookie pitchers in wins, ERA, and strikeouts through the end of May. He was named National League Rookie of the Month in May and was considered a contender for NL Rookie of the Year before his season was once again shortened due to injuries, including a bone spur that had to be surgically removed.

Matz again battled through injuries in 2017, making just 13 starts in a season that ended with surgery to address ulnar nerve irritation. He played his first 30-start season in 2018, recording a 5–11 record, 3.97 ERA, and 1.25 WHIP. In 2019, Matz had the best ERA of any Mets starting pitcher through June, and though he struggled in later starts, he finished the season at 11–10, his first winning record since 2016. Matz has been involved in several charitable efforts, including starting the charity initiative Tru 32, which honors first responders from the New York City Fire Department, New York City Police Department, and U.S. Military.

== Early life ==
Steven Matz was born on May 29, 1991, in Stony Brook, New York, the second child of Ron and Lori Matz. He has an older brother, Jonathan, and a younger sister, Jillian. Ron Matz coached a travel baseball team, and was a service manager at a Jeep dealership in West Islip, New York. Lori was an administrative employee at Comsewogue High School in Port Jefferson Station, New York. Matz and his family, as far back as his grandparents, were fans of the New York Mets. As a child, Matz attended the Nassakeag Elementary School in the Three Village Central School District.

Matz first started playing baseball in the Three Village Little League when he was 8 years old. By age 10, Matz began receiving pitching lessons from former Major League Baseball (MLB) pitcher Neal Heaton, a fellow lefthander who also hailed from the area. He attended Ward Melville High School in East Setauket, New York, where he pitched and played first base for the school's baseball team. He played varsity since his freshman year, during which time his fastball averaged 90 miles per hour. Matz first drew attention from scouts in the New York Mets organization during a baseball showcase tournament in 2008, and their interest in him continued to grow in subsequent years. MLB scouts began attending his starts regularly during his senior season.

Matz enjoyed a high school rivalry with Marcus Stroman, a friend and future New York Mets teammate, who was a pitcher for the nearby Patchogue-Medford High School. Matz and Stroman were teammates on the same elite travel team, the Paveco Storm, for several years in junior high and high school. The two were roommates during the Area Code Games and pitched against each other several times in high school, including a notable game on April 16, 2009, which was attended by more than 50 scouts from every MLB team, and is considered one of the best games in the history of Long Island high school baseball. Matz struck out 12 and allowed one hit, leading his team to a 1–0 victory, while Stroman struck out 14 and allowed three hits, and both pitchers threw complete games. Mets scout Larry Izzo later called it "one of the best duels I've ever seen".

Matz posted a 6–1 win–loss record in his senior season, allowing two earned runs and 14 hits in 54 innings, with 74 strikeouts, and a 0.47 earned run average (ERA), helping Ward Melville win its first league title in 34 years. He also had a .408 batting average with nine doubles, six home runs, and 34 RBIs. Matz was named Newsday's Long Island Player of the Year, and won the Yastrzemski Award as the best high school ballplayer in Suffolk County in his senior year. Forty different NCAA Division I schools attempted to recruit Matz to their college teams.

== Professional career ==
=== Minor leagues ===
The New York Mets selected Matz in the second round, with the 72nd overall selection, of the 2009 MLB draft, the same year he graduated from high school. He was the first player to be drafted directly out of Ward Melville High School. The Mets did not have a first round pick in that year's draft and did not expect Matz to drop to them in the second round. Some Mets scouts attributed his drop to his playing high school baseball in the Northeast, an area which does not traditionally produce much high-round talent. Matz, who was seeking a $1.1 million signing bonus, received interest from the Los Angeles Dodgers and Chicago White Sox, but both ultimately passed on him, and he fell to the Mets. Matz was originally committed to attend Coastal Carolina University to play college baseball for the Coastal Carolina Chanticleers, but the Mets agreed to sign him with an $895,000 bonus, which was not finalized until minutes before the August 15 signing deadline for draft picks. Matz had scheduled a flight to attend his orientation at Coastal Carolina for the next day.

While pitching in an instructional league in 2010, Matz experienced elbow discomfort. A doctor diagnosed him with an 80 percent tear in his ulnar collateral ligament of the elbow, and Matz underwent Tommy John surgery on May 18, 2010. His recovery lasted two years, during which he rehabbed regularly with fellow Mets organization pitcher Jacob deGrom. The two became close friends, and began living in the same house in Port St. Lucie, Florida during every spring training there. Matz did not make his professional debut until 2012, when he pitched for the Kingsport Mets of the Rookie-level Appalachian League. He initially continued to feel elbow pain, and doctors said they were not sure if the implanted ligament in his elbow had healed, but advised him to test it simply by playing and throwing as hard as he could. Eventually, the pain disappeared. Matz compiled a 2–1 record and 1.55 ERA in 29 innings pitched with Kingsport.

Before the 2013 season, Matz worked on developing a curveball to replace his slider, at the advice of Frank Viola and Ron Romanick. That year, he pitched for the Savannah Sand Gnats of the Single–A South Atlantic League, where he had a 5–6 record and 2.62 ERA while recording 121 strikeouts in 106 1/3 innings pitched. Matz had 12 2/3 shutout innings and 17 strikeouts for Savannah during the playoffs. He pitched seven shutout innings in a Southern Division-clinching game against the Augusta Greenjackets on September 6, 2013, and pitched the team to the 2013 SAL championship on September 13, throwing 5 2/3 innings against the Hagerstown Suns and striking out nine batters in the 2–0 victory.

The Mets added Matz to their 40-man roster on November 20, 2013, to protect him from being selected in the Rule 5 draft. He began the 2014 season with the St. Lucie Mets of the High–A Florida State League, where he had a 4–4 record and 2.21 ERA in 69 1/3 innings pitched, and was named to the league's All-Star team, before he was promoted to the Binghamton Mets of the Double–A Eastern League in June. With Binghamton, Matz pitched to a 6–5 record with a 2.28 ERA and 69 strikeouts in 71 innings. He pitched the game that clinched Binghamton the Eastern League championship in 2014, striking out 11 and allowing no hits through seventh innings, as Binghamton defeated the Richmond Flying Squirrels 2–1 on September 12. After the 2014 season with Binghamton, the Mets named Matz their Organizational Pitcher of the Year.

Matz opened the 2015 season with the Las Vegas 51s of the Triple–A Pacific Coast League. In 15 games started for Las Vegas, Matz had a 7–4 record and 2.19 ERA, the best ERA in the league, as well as 9.4 strikeouts per nine innings, the best of any qualified starting pitcher in the Pacific Coast League. Matz also had 94 strikeouts over 90 1/3 innings, as well as a .304 batting average. Across four seasons with five teams in his minor league career, Matz posted an overall 2.28 ERA and never allowed more than two runs in consecutive starts.

=== New York Mets ===
==== 2015 ====
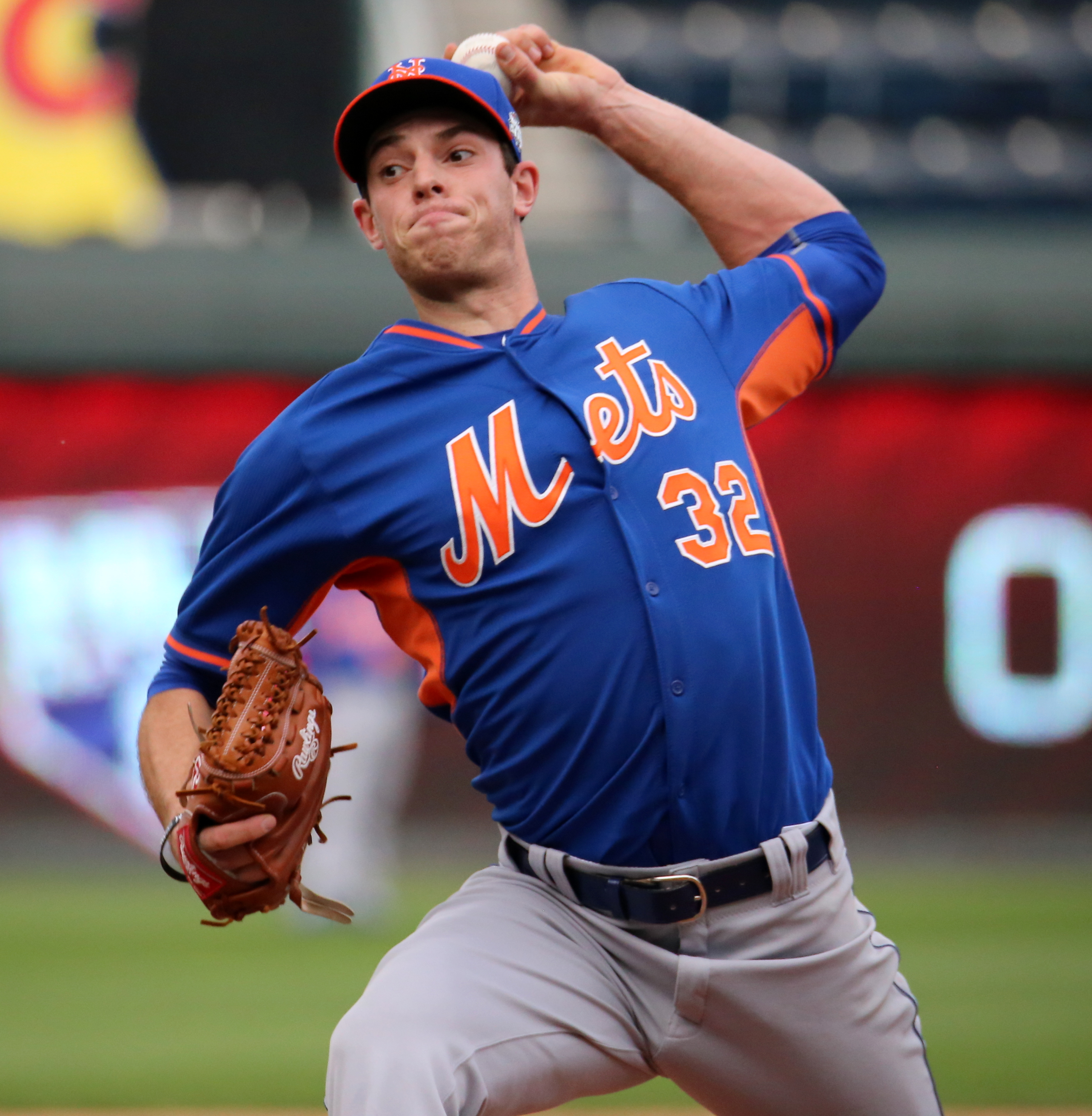
Matz pitching during a live batting practice in 2015.

Steven Matz was called up to the New York Mets to join a six-man pitching rotation for the 2015 season, along with Bartolo Colón, Jacob deGrom, Matt Harvey, Jon Niese, and Noah Syndergaard. He was the first Long Island high school pitcher to make his MLB debut with the Mets since Ray Searage in 1981.

Matz debuted against the Cincinnati Reds at the Mets' Citi Field on June 28, 2015. His first MLB pitch, to Brandon Phillips, was wild enough to escape the mitt of the catcher; later in that at-bat Phillips hit a home run. Nevertheless, Matz got the win, giving up two runs, five hits, and three walks, and striking out six over 110 pitches in 7 2/3 innings, as the Mets defeated the Reds 7–2. Additionally, using a bat gifted to him by Las Vegas teammate Matt Reynolds, Matz recorded three hits as a batter and drove in four runs. His first major league at-bat was a two-run double against pitcher Josh Smith. Matz was the first pitcher in MLB history to record that many hits and RBIs in his debut game, and the 11th player at any position to do so. He was also the seventh pitcher since 1914 with three or more hits in his first game, and the first since Jason Jennings of the Colorado Rockies in 2001. Matz was the first pitcher and the 26th player in any position in the last 100 years with four RBI in his MLB debut. Additionally, he was the first Mets pitcher in franchise history to record three or more hits in his debut, and the first Met in any position to have four RBI in his first game. He was also the sixth Mets pitcher with four RBI in any game, and the first since Dwight Gooden in 1990.

In his second start, Matz pitched six scoreless innings while striking out eight and allowing two hits in a win against the Los Angeles Dodgers. He had a 1.32 ERA, 14 strikeouts, and five walks over 13 innings across his first two games. Shortly afterward, Matz was placed on the disabled list for two months due to a partial tear in the latissimus muscle in his left side. Matz returned to the pitching rotation on September 6 with a no decision, but won his next two consecutive starts. Following a 5–1 win against the New York Yankees on September 18, Matz became the first player in Mets history to allow two runs or fewer in each of his first five career starts. He finished the regular season with a 4–0 record, 2.27 ERA, and 1.23 WHIP over six starts, with 34 strikeouts in 35 2/3 innings pitched. Matz experienced back soreness caused by spasms behind his right shoulder blade near the end of the season, which forced him to miss his final regular season start and threatened to sideline him again; however, he played through it and remained on the Mets pitching rotation during the team's postseason run. He made three postseason starts: one each in the National League Division Series (NLDS), National League Championship Series (NLCS), and World Series.

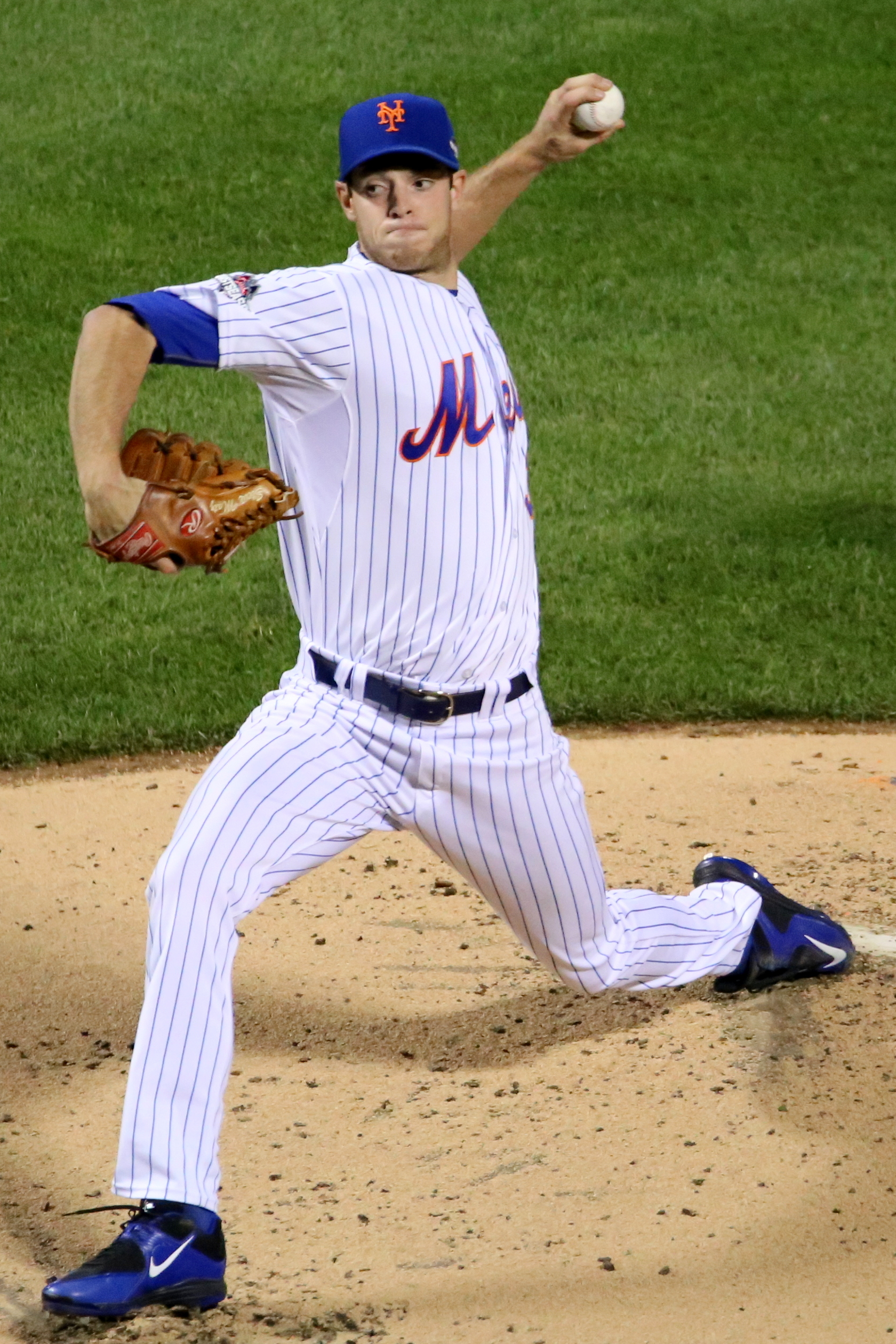
Matz pitching in the 2015 National League Division Series

Matz pitched in Game 4 of the NLDS, allowing three earned runs in the third inning in a 3–1 loss at home to the Los Angeles Dodgers, marking his first loss in the major leagues. He also started in Game 4 of the NLCS against the Chicago Cubs at Wrigley Field, allowing one earned run in 4 2/3 innings, but was denied a chance at the win after being pulled with a 6–1 lead and two outs in the fifth inning. The Mets won the game 8–3, clinching the pennant. Matz pitched in Game 4 of the World Series, with the Mets trailing the Kansas City Royals 2–1 in the series going in. He allowed two runs on seven hits and had five strikeouts, and allowed only one hit in the first four innings. Mets manager Terry Collins allowed Matz to hit for himself in the fifth inning, then kept him in to pitch in the sixth. With the game tied 2–2, Matz allowed a double from Ben Zobrist and a run-scoring single from Lorenzo Cain, giving the Royals the lead before Matz was pulled. Matz received a no-decision as Kansas City won the game 5–3. The Royals went on to win the World Series in Game 5.

Matz had a 3.68 ERA across his three postseason starts. He was the only Mets starting pitcher without a postseason win. The Mets pitching rotation had a combined 3.43 ERA in 2015, the fourth-best in the league. Matz finished the season with a .286 batting average and .643 OPS. Following the 2015 season, Matz, deGrom, Harvey, and Syndergaard were awarded the Joe DiMaggio Toast of the Town award by the New York chapter of the Baseball Writers' Association of America.

==== 2016 ====
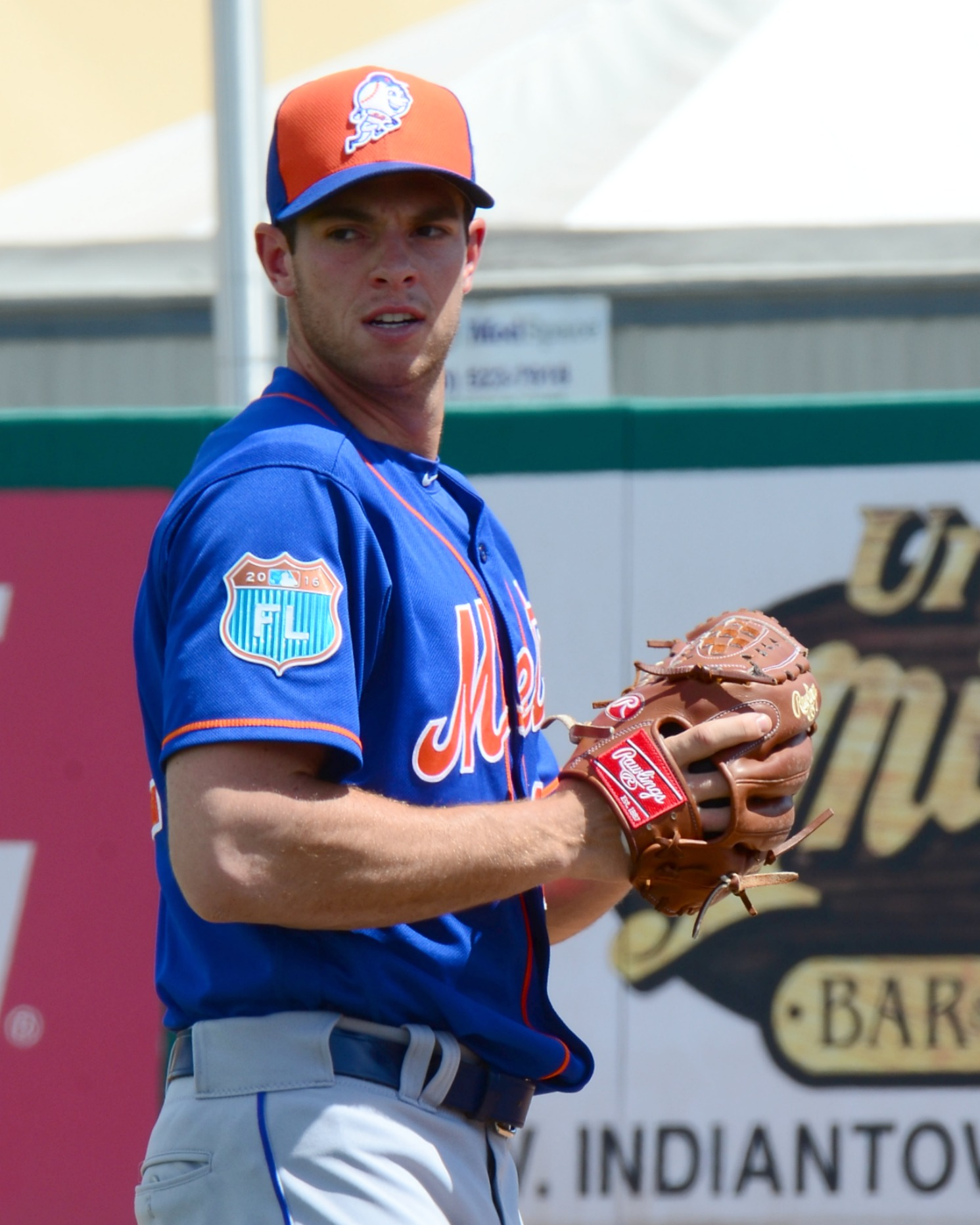
Steven Matz during Spring Training 2016

Matz made the Mets' opening day roster in 2016 as the fifth starter in the Mets rotation, along with Colón, deGrom, Harvey, and Syndergaard. Despite his experience with the Mets in 2015, Matz was still considered a rookie player in 2016 due to the amount of time he missed the previous year. Matz opened the season with the worst start of his career to date, surrendering seven runs before getting pulled in the seventh inning of a 10–3 loss to the Miami Marlins. However, Matz rebounded and won his next seven consecutive starts, bringing his record to 7–1 and his ERA to 2.36 by May 25, He allowed two runs or fewer in every game over that span, the best streak in the majors in that time period, and he was only the fifth MLB rookie since 1920 to have such a long streak. In May, he went 4–0 across five starts with a 1.83 ERA, with 31 strikeouts and batters hitting .180 against him. He allowed two or fewer earned runs in nine consecutive starts from April 17 to June 7. By the end of May, he was leading all rookie pitchers in wins (seven), ERA (2.60) and strikeouts (53). He was named National League Rookie of the Month for May, becoming only the third Mets player to receive that distinction, along with Justin Turner in 2011 and Jacob deGrom in 2014. Matz was also considered a contender for National League Rookie of the Year.

In early May, Matz was discovered to have a large bone spur in his throwing elbow. but doctors also determined there was no ligament damage in the arm. Matz attempted to continue playing through the bone spur after receiving medical assurances that doing so would not cause additional damage to his elbow. He received a cortisone shot, and the team hoped he could wait until the offseason to have surgery. Matz threw eight innings for the first time in his career on May 25, allowing no runs and retiring 16 consecutive batters against the Washington Nationals in a 2–0 win. As of June 10, Matz's ERA was 2.39, the best among rookie starters, and he was averaging 17.9 seconds between pitches, the quickest length of time in the MLB. However, his elbow discomfort returned in June, and in a 13-game stretch from May 13 to August 9, he posted a 1–7 record, and a 4.42 ERA. Matz threw a career-high 120 pitches against the Arizona Diamondbacks on August 9. In his next start against the San Diego Padres on August 14, Matz did not allow a hit until a single in the eighth inning on his 105th pitch.

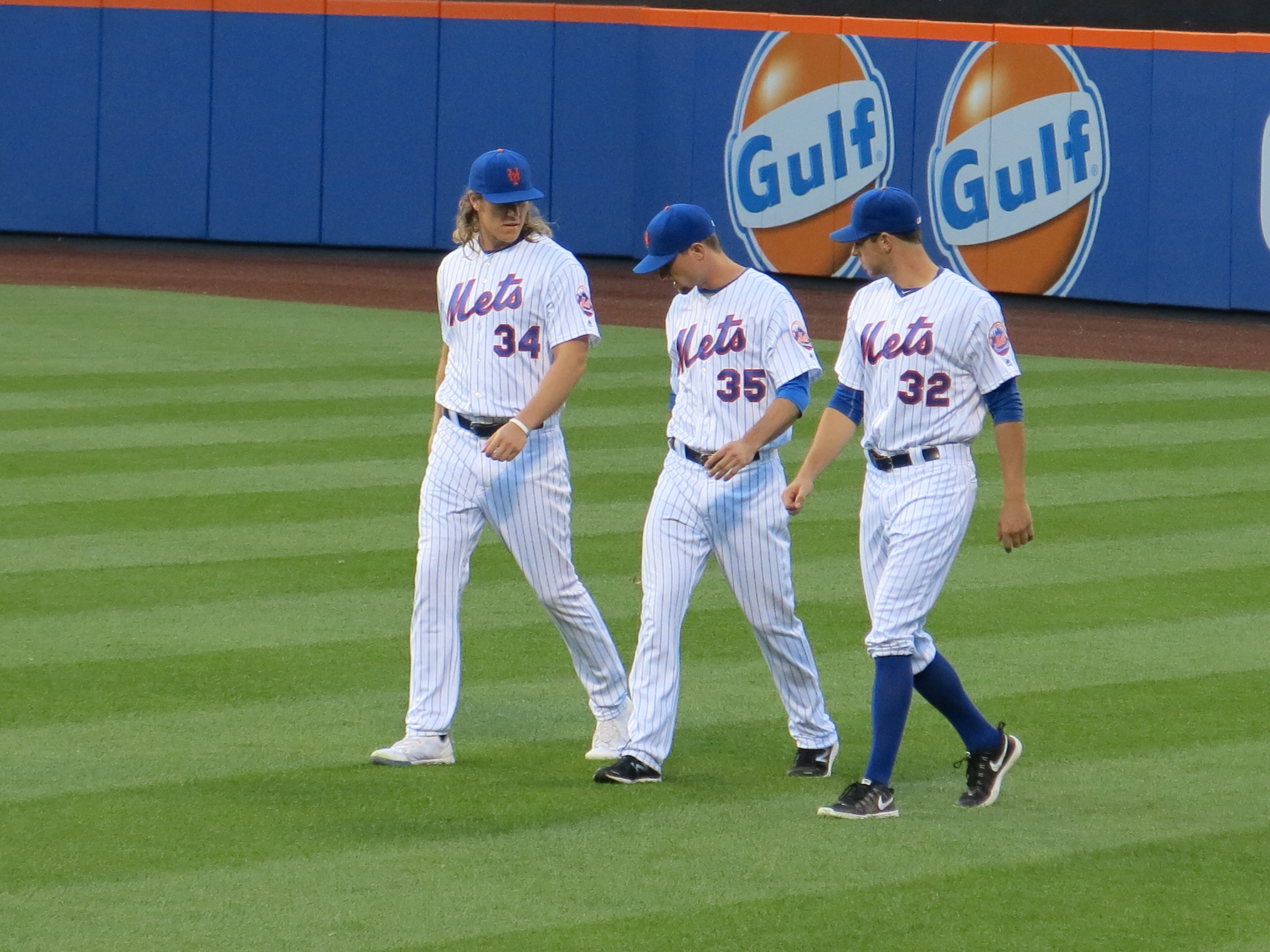
Steven Matz (right) along with Noah Syndergaard (left) and Logan Verrett (center) on August 2, 2016

While throwing in preparation for an August start, he felt a twinge in his left shoulder, apparently unrelated to his bone spur. Following his August 14 start, Matz was added to the disabled list due to a left shoulder impingement. Matz rehabbed his left shoulder in September, and tried to return to the pitching rotation several times, with the team hoping to bring him back before the end of the season in the Mets bullpen. But he was shut down for the season later that month, and had surgery in October to remove the bone spurs, which ended his season. Matz finished 2016 season with a 9–8 record, 3.40 ERA, 1.21 WHIP, and 121 strikeouts. He threw in 22 starts and 132 1/3 innings, both of which were career highs. Despite losing Matz as well as deGrom and Harvey to season-ending injuries, the Mets pitching rotation finished 2016 with the third-best ERA in the league. Matz received one third-place vote for 2016 National League Rookie of the Year, placing him in a three-way tie for sixth place with Jon Gray and Seung-hwan Oh. The Mets made the 2016 playoffs, but lost the National League Wild Card Game to the San Francisco Giants.

==== 2017 ====
At the start of the season, the MLB marketed the Mets pitching rotation of Matz, Jacob deGrom, Matt Harvey, and Noah Syndergaard as the "Four Horsemen of Queens", with a commercial suggesting they could be "the best staff in baseball". Matz missed the first two months of the 2017 season due to an elbow inflammation. Team doctors believed at the time it might have been a side effect of his bone spur surgery the previous fall, and prescribed platelet-rich plasma injections and rest. Matz said the injury was a strained flexor tendon in his elbow, though that diagnosis was not made by the Mets' doctors. Matz made his first start of the season on June 10. He performed well in his first five starts, posting a 2.12 ERA and logging at least six innings in each game, and back-to-back scoreless starts on June 28 and July 3.

However, in his subsequent six starts between July 9 and August 6, Matz had a 0–4 record, 11.03 ERA, 2.20 WHIP, and 29 earned runs and 46 hits allowed over that span. Matz surrendered a career-worst seven earned runs in less than two innings during his July 16 start against the Colorado Rockies, which also marked the shortest start of his career to that point. In late August, doctors determined Matz had ulnar nerve irritation in his left elbow. He required season-ending surgery to decompress and reposition the ulnar nerve, a procedure similar to one DeGrom underwent in 2016. After it was announced Matz would require surgery, it was revealed he had been skipping bullpen sessions between starts, and limiting the use of his slider to lessen the strain on his elbow. That led to questions over whether he was healthy enough to pitch in the first place, though Matz said it was ultimately his decision. Matz pitched just 66 2/3 innings in 13 starts in the 2017 season, compiling a record of 2–7, a 6.08 ERA, and 45 earned runs allowed.

==== 2018 ====
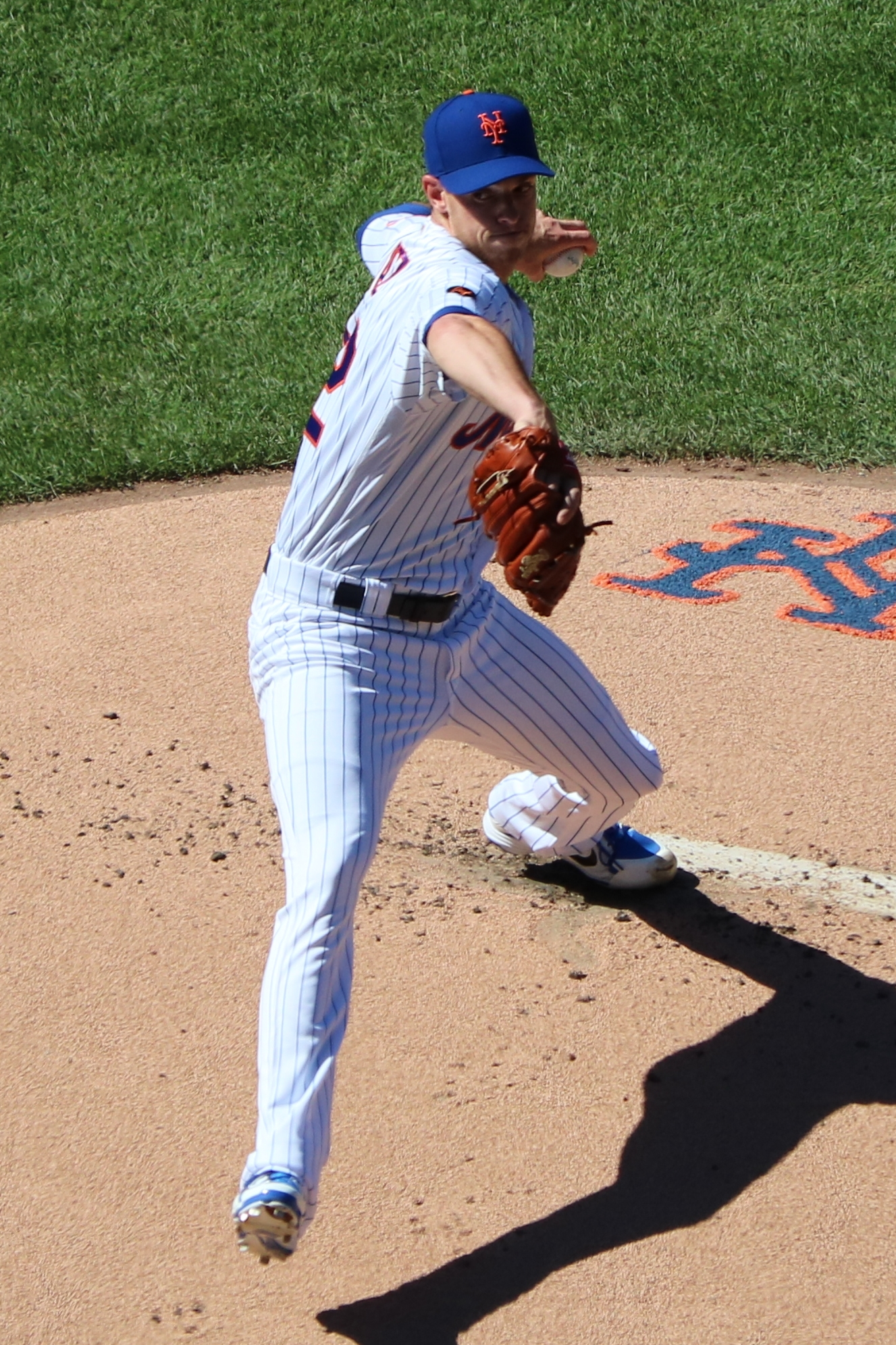
Steven Matz pitching for the Mets in 2018.

Matz recovered from his injuries in time for the start of the 2018 season, and faced minimal injury troubles during the year. He won a spot in the Mets starting rotation during spring training. His first start of the season was against the St. Louis Cardinals on April 1, in which he lasted just four innings while allowing four hits, three walks, and three runs. It marked the third time in nine starts that he failed to complete more than four innings, bringing his record over that span to 0–7, with a 9.82 ERA and 2.02 WHIP. He notched a victory against the Milwaukee Brewers on April 13, his first recorded win since June 28, 2017, ending a streak of seven consecutive losses and 11 starts with either a loss or no-decision. He failed to pitch beyond four innings in two additional starts in April.

Matz allowed no runs in a 5–0 win against the Milwaukee Brewers on May 24, his first start with no runs since July 3, 2017. Matz had a 3.31 ERA in his first 13 starts of the season through June 16, allowing 24 earned runs over 65 1/3 innings. He had a 2.91 ERA in 13 starts between May 5 and the All-Star break in mid-July, and had a 2.25 ERA in road starts on the season. Matz and fellow Mets pitchers deGrom, Syndergaard, and Zack Wheeler combined for a 3.07 ERA heading into the All-Star break, the second-best of any MLB pitching rotation behind only the Houston Astros' 3.02 ERA. In his first three starts following the All-Star break, Matz allowed 16 runs in 11 2/3 innings for a 12.35 ERA.

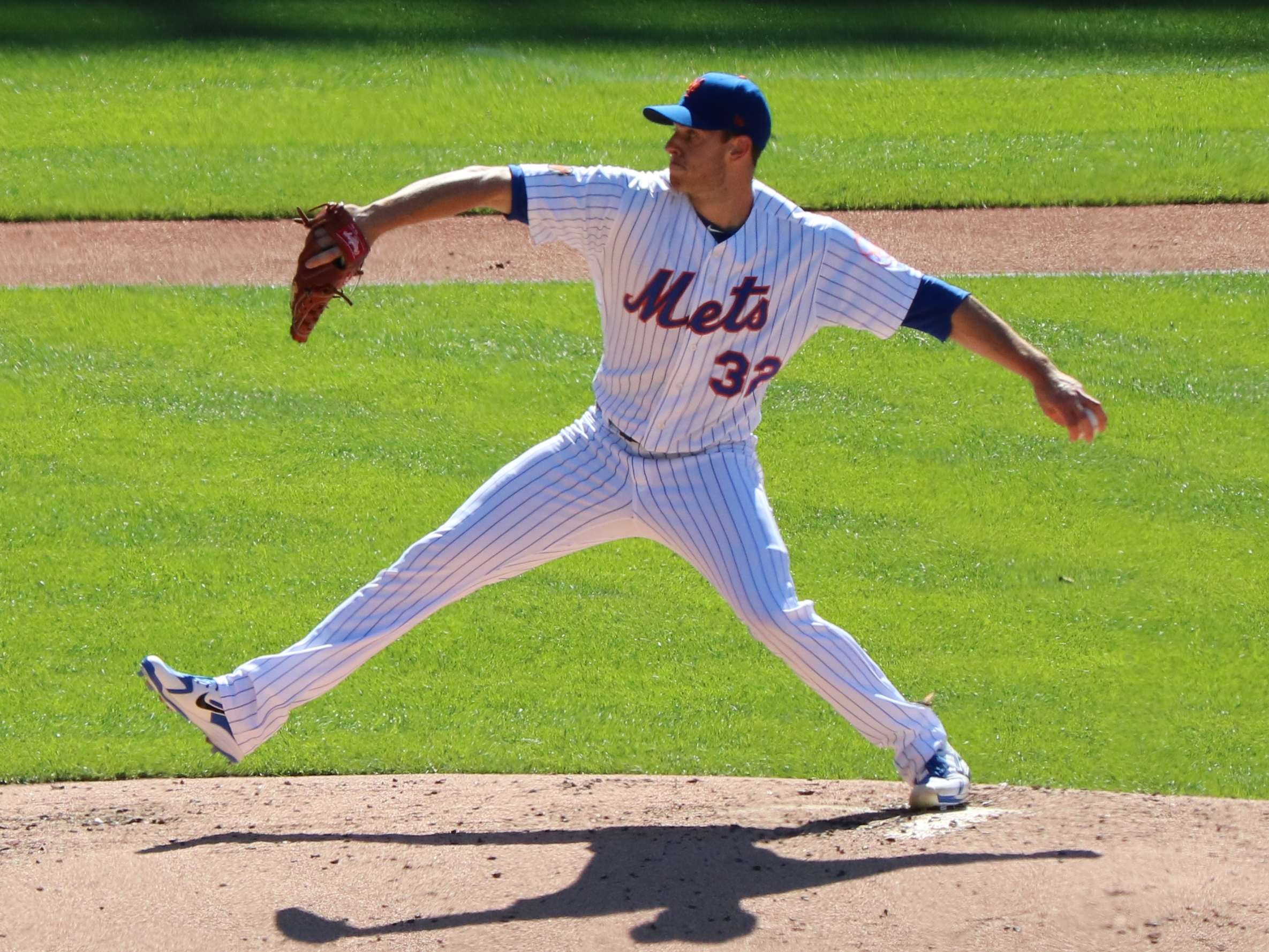
Steven Matz pitching on July 7, 2018.

Matz tied a career high with nine strikeouts against the Pittsburgh Pirates on July 26, but followed that performance with a July 31 start against the Washington Nationals in which he was pulled after recording two outs and allowing seven runs on eight hits in 2/3 of an inning, marking the shortest start of Matz's career, and matching his career-high in runs allowed. The game ended with a 25–4 loss, the most lopsided in Mets' history, and caused Matz's season ERA to rise from 3.79 to 4.35, compared to 3.21 before the All-Star break. Matz was placed on the disabled list for two weeks in early August due to a flexor pronator strain in his left elbow. On September 1 against the San Francisco Giants, Matz struck out a career-high 11 batters over seven innings, allowing three hits, one run, and one walk. Matz hit his first career home run on September 13, 2018, against the Miami Marlins pitcher Sandy Alcántara, the first by a Mets pitcher in 2018. Matz hit another home run on his next start on September 18 against Philadelphia Phillies pitcher Aaron Nola, becoming only the third Mets pitcher to homer in consecutive appearances, along with Tom Seaver in 1972 and Ron Darling in 1989.

Matz posted a 4.97 ERA in the second half of the year, with no-decisions in each of his final six starts and no wins in his final 10. He threw eight quality starts and had a 2.90 ERA in his final 10 home outings of the season. Matz finished the 2018 season with a career-high 30 starts, a 5–11 record, 3.97 ERA, and 1.25 WHIP, with 152 strikeouts and 58 walks over a career-high 154 innings. A total of 15.4 percent of balls put in play against Matz were line drives, the lowest rate in the MLB for a pitcher throwing at least 140 innings, and 48.8 percent of those in play against him were grounders, the ninth-highest percentage in the National League. Matz increased his strikeout-to-walk ratio from 11.8 in the first half of the season to 18.6 by the end. He allowed 28 stolen bases in 2018, the second-highest amount of any major league pitcher, behind only Mets teammates Syndergaard's 32. On average, Matz took 19.5 seconds between pitches during the season, the second-fastest among 336 pitchers in the league who threw at least 50 innings, behind only Milwaukee Brewers pitcher Brent Suter's 18.6 seconds.

==== 2019 ====
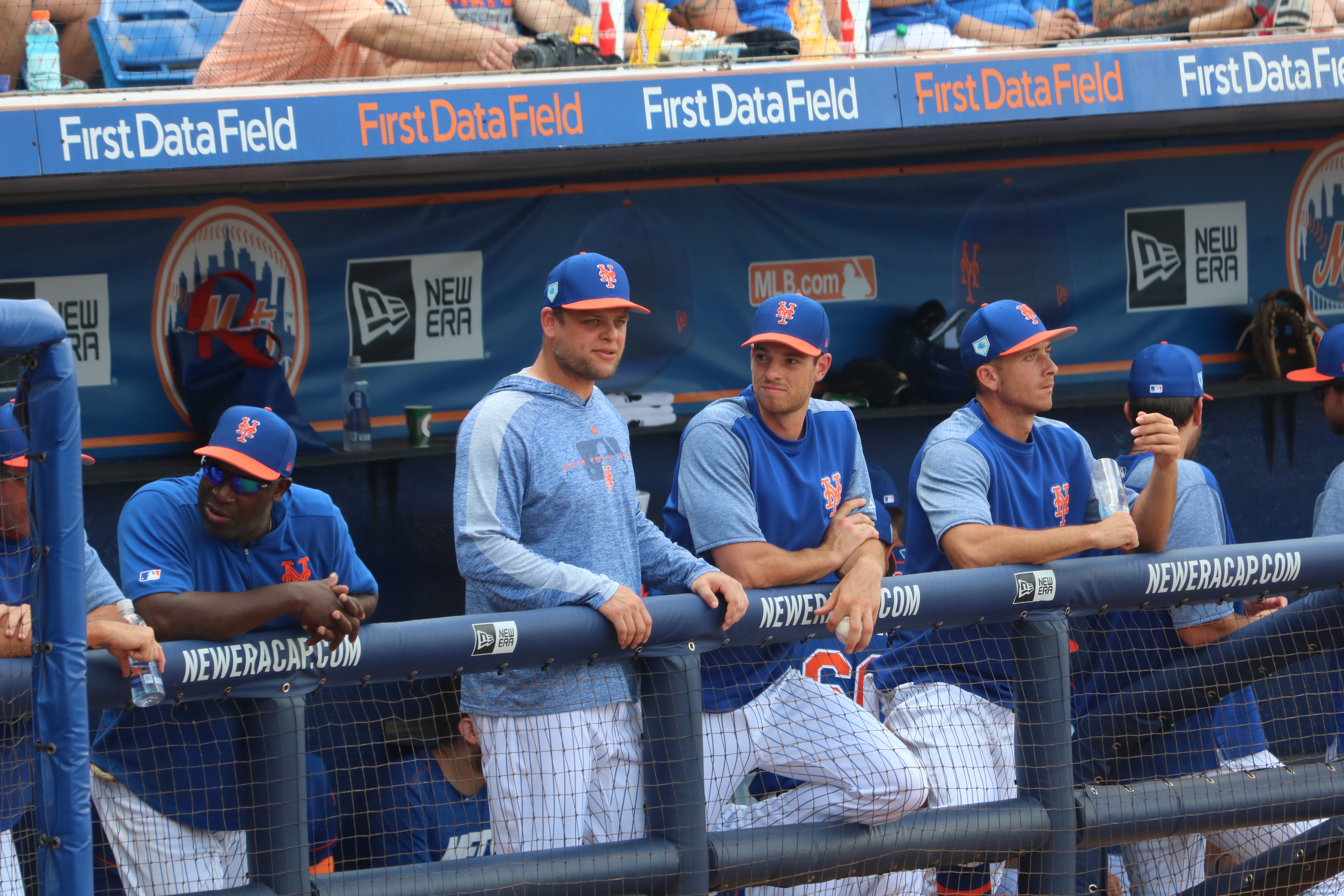
Steven Matz (center) with (from left to right) Chili Davis, Devin Mesoraco, and T. J. Rivera on March 2, 2019.

Matz prepared for 2019 by practicing light throwing nearly the entire off-season, starting in mid-October and taking only two weeks off, a method inspired by that of fellow Mets pitcher Jacob deGrom. On January 11, 2019, Matz and the Mets agreed to a one-year contract worth $2.625 million, avoiding salary arbitration and raising Matz's salary more than four times his $577,000 the previous season.

Matz had a 0.87 ERA across his first two starts of the regular season, lowering his ERA to 2.14 over his previous 10 starts. However, his first two starts of 2019 were no-decisions, bringing Matz to a franchise-record eight consecutive no-decisions since September 1, 2018, with no wins in 12 starts since July 26 of that year. Nevertheless, Matz had five strong starts in his first six appearances in 2019, resulting in a 3–1 record. The exception was Matz's worst game of the season on April 16, when he allowed eight runs (six earned) and had zero outs against the Philadelphia Phillies before getting pulled in the first inning, marking his highest run total of the season, and raising his ERA from 1.65 to 4.96. Matz became one of only six pitchers in MLB history to face eight batters and retire none, the ninth pitcher since 1908 to pitch less than one inning and allow at least eight runs, and the first Met to do so since Bobby Jones in 1997.

With the exception of that game, Matz notched three quality starts in his final four April appearances, and had a 3.86 ERA across 35 innings in his first seven starts through May 3, allowing two or fewer runs in all but one of those games. After missing two weeks in May due to radial nerve discomfort in his left forearm, Matz had a career-best 9.07 K/9 by May 23, and his walk rate of 2.62 per nine innings was 0.77 better than his average the previous year. Matz went into June with a 4–3 record, 3.55 ERA, and 1.34 WHIP, pitching at least six innings and allowing two runs or fewer in four of his past six starts. His ERA was the best among the Mets starting pitchers. Also at the start of June, Matz had a 3.03 ERA and .224 opponent average (74–331) over his previous 17 starts since August 21, 2018, the 12th-best ERA and 10th-best opponent average in the National League over that time period.

Matz struggled in most of his June starts, beginning with a June 2 loss to the Arizona Diamondbacks in which he surrendered five runs over six innings. Despite matching career-highs in strikeouts (10) and pitches (120) in a 5–3 win against the Colorado Rockies on June 8, he dropped his next two starts, having surrendered at least five runs in three of his last five starts. Those games were followed by a June 24 start against the Philadelphia Phillies in which Matz was charged with seven earned runs on 10 hits over 4 1/3 innings, including three home runs, bringing his road ERA to 7.07 on the season. Matz ended June with a 7.36 ERA through his six starts in the month, allowing eight home runs in 29 1/3 innings, and bringing his season total of first-inning home runs allowed to 10. On July 2, Matz was temporarily moved to the Mets bullpen, but returned to the starting rotation after the All-Star break.

Matz finished the first half of the season with a 4.89 ERA, and a 5–6 record, with an 11.40 ERA in the first innings across all his starts for the season. Over his next three outings, Matz had a 2–0 record with a 1.89 ERA, 15 strikeouts, and two walks. This included his first complete-game shutout on July 27, throwing 99 pitches, recording seven strikeouts, and allowing five hits as the Mets defeated the Pittsburgh Pirates 3–0. It marked the eighth time in Mets' history that a pitcher threw a complete game shutout in under 100 pitches (known as a Maddux), and the first time since Johan Santana threw one in 2012. Matz and the rest of the Mets' starting rotation recorded a post-All Star Break ERA of 2.62 through August 7, the best in the majors at that point, which helped place the Mets back into Wild Card contention despite them finishing the first half of the season 10 games under .500. By August 20, Matz had a 2.81 ERA and 3–1 record across his seven starts and 41 2/3 innings since the All-Star break, striking out 38 batters and allowing just three home runs, and recording a quality start in five of his previous six games. He also allowed no runs during the first innings of each of those seven starts, bringing his first-inning ERA down to 8.14.

After throwing six shutout innings in a 9–0 win against the Arizona Diamondbacks on September 11, Matz improved to a 7–1 record and 1.94 ERA in 2019 home games. Matz surrendered seven earned runs on six hits in his final road start of the season on September 16, including six runs in the fourth inning alone, in a 9–4 loss to the Colorado Rockies. The game brought his road ERA to 6.62 on the season, compared to 1.94 ERA at home at the time. Matz gave up the first grand slam of his career against Jorge Alfaro of the Miami Marlins on September 23. Matz allowed six earned runs on nine hits in the 8–4 loss, which critically hurt the Mets' chances of making the playoffs. Matz threw six shutout innings, and notched seven strikeouts, in a win against the Atlanta Braves during his final start of the season on September 28. It marked the 20th time in two years that he held his opponents to fewer than four hits in a game.

Matz finished the season at 11–10, marking his first winning record since 2016. He ended 2019 with a 4.21 ERA, 1.34 WHIP, and 52 walks, as well as new career-highs in strikeouts (153) and innings pitched (160 1/3).

==== 2020 ====
Matz went through a regression in the pandemic-shortened 2020 season, as he went 0–4 with a 9.00 ERA in his first four starts before being pulled from the Mets' starting rotation. He was placed on the injured list on August 29 due to left shoulder discomfort, which sidelined him for three weeks. He finished the season 0–5 with a 9.68 ERA in nine games (six starts).

=== Toronto Blue Jays ===
On January 27, 2021, the Mets traded Matz to the Toronto Blue Jays in exchange for right-handed pitchers Sean Reid-Foley, Yennsy Díaz, and Josh Winckowski.

On July 24, 2021, Matz faced the Mets at Citi Field for the first time since being traded to the Blue Jays. After receiving a very warm welcome from the sparse crowd, Matz pitched 5 2/3 innings giving up four hits, two earned runs from a Pete Alonso home run in the first inning, and three walks while striking out five, in a 3–0 loss. The tough-luck loss dropped Matz's record on the season to 8-5.

On August 22, Matz gave up Miguel Cabrera's 500th career home run in the sixth inning of a game against the Detroit Tigers. In 2021, Matz posted a 14–7 record with a 3.82 ERA and 144 strikeouts in 150 2/3 innings over 29 starts. His 14 wins tied for second in the American League.

=== St. Louis Cardinals ===
Matz became a much-sought-after free agent after his bounce-back year in Toronto, with at least six teams pursuing him. Just as it seemed he was about to sign a deal to return to the Mets, Matz on November 29, 2021 finalized a four-year $44 million contract to pitch for the St. Louis Cardinals. (Mets' owner Steve Cohen raged on Twitter against Matz's agent, saying, "I’ve never seen such unprofessional behavior exhibited by a player’s agent. I guess words and promises don’t matter." For his part, Matz denied having made any verbal agreements with the Mets, and both Cohen and Matz insisted that they had no issue with the other.) Matz made 15 appearances (10 starts) for the Cardinals in 2022, missing half of the year due to injuries, and compiled a 5.25 ERA with 54 strikeouts over 48 innings. The following year, 2023, Matz made 25 appearances (17 starts) for St. Louis, registering a 4–7 record and 3.86 ERA with 98 strikeouts across 105 innings pitched.

Matz began the 2024 season as part of the Cardinals' rotation, struggling to a 6.18 ERA in six starts. He was placed on the injured list with a lower back strain on May 3, 2024, and transferred to the 60–day injured list on June 28. Matz was activated on September 1. He made 12 total appearances for the Cardinals, compiling a 1-2 record and 5.08 ERA with 33 strikeouts across 44 1/3 innings pitched.

Matz began the 2025 season in the Cardinals' bullpen. In his first appearance on March 30, 2025, he recorded his first career save. In 32 appearances (two starts) for St. Louis, Matz pitched to a 5-2 record and 3.44 ERA with 47 strikeouts over 55 innings of work.

=== Boston Red Sox ===
On July 31, 2025, the Cardinals traded Matz to the Boston Red Sox in exchange for Blaze Jordan. Matz made 21 relief appearances for the Red Sox, recording a 2.08 ERA with 12 strikeouts and one save across 21 2/3 innings pitched.

=== Tampa Bay Rays ===
On December 16, 2025, Matz signed a two-year, $15 million contract with the Tampa Bay Rays. On June 6, 2026, the Rays announced that Matz would be moving to the bullpen after recording a 5.48 ERA across his first 10 starts of the season.

== Pitching style ==
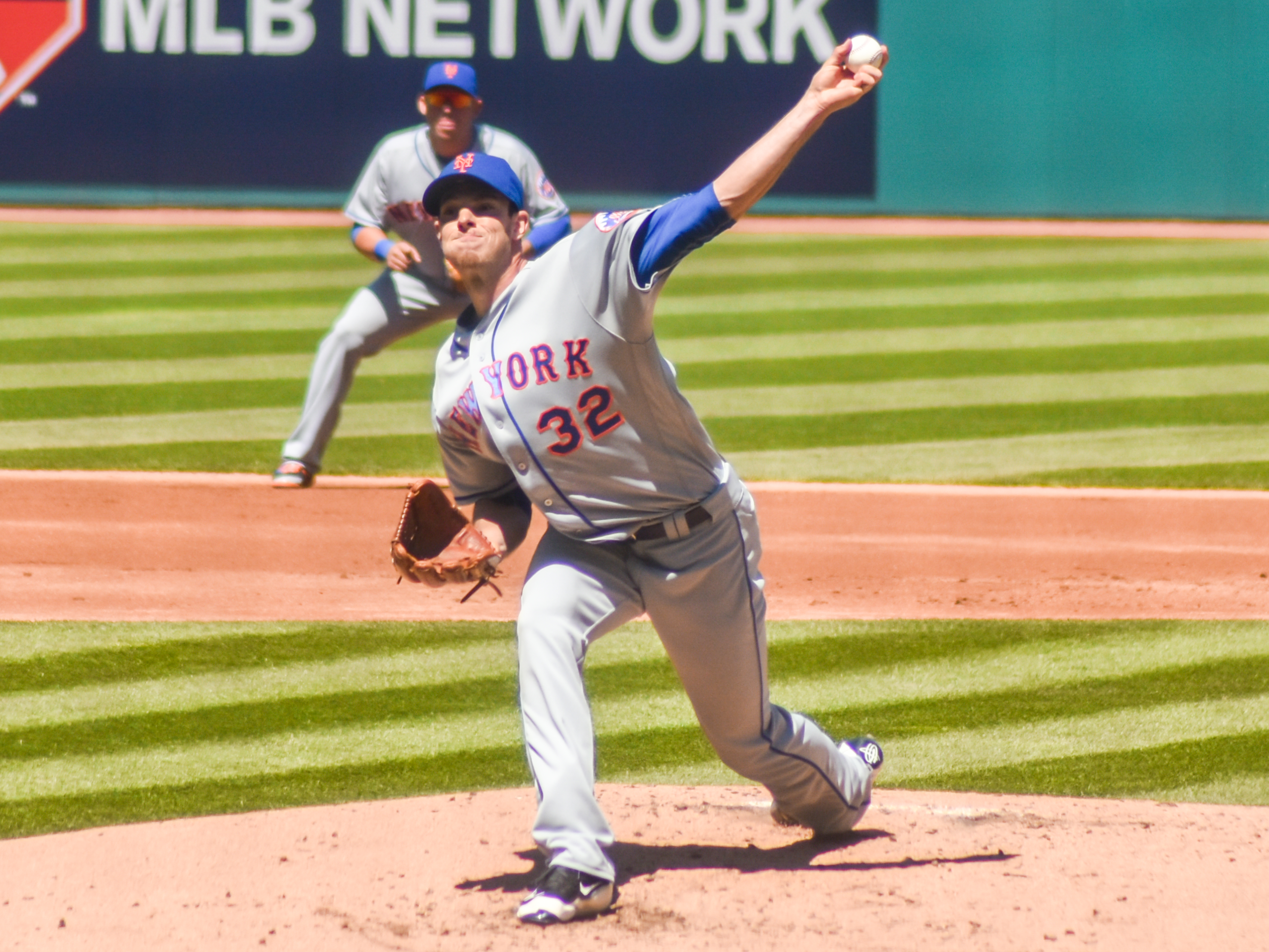
Matz delivers a pitch for the Mets in 2019

Matz has an average fastball velocity of between 92 and 94 miles per hour, with a peak velocity of 95 miles per hour. His curveball velocity averages between 76 and 78 miles per hour, while his changeup averages between 81 and 83. Matz had a strong fastball since an early age, but during his minor league career he made a conscious effort to develop his curveball and work it into his pitching repertoire in place of his slider. According to Baseball Prospectus, Matz has "smooth mechanics with little wasted movement", with strong front side pitching, quick arm movements, and good repetition of mechanics. In a 2014 scouting report for the website, Jeff Moore wrote, "if the change-up continues to develop, he'll have three offerings he can throw any hitter at any time", along with the fastball and curveball. Moore added Matz's fastball velocity comes with minimal effort and that he positions it well on the outer half of the strike zone for right-handed hitters. Regarding the curveball, Moore wrote: "It's not a power curveball, but the break is tight and sharp. Because he changes eye levels, he will get some swings and misses. Left-handed hitters will be uncomfortable." In 2019, Matz primarily relied on his sinking fastball, which averaged 94 miles per hour, and the changeup, which averaged 85 miles per hour, while also mixing in a curveball (79 miles per hour) and slider (90 miles per hour). According to the website Brooks Baseball:

"His sinker generates a high number of swings & misses compared to other pitchers' sinkers, has well above average velo and results in somewhat more flyballs compared to other pitchers' sinkers. His change dives down out of the zone, is slightly firmer than usual and has slight armside fade. His curve has sweeping glove-side movement and is slightly harder than usual. His slider is thrown extremely hard, is basically never swung at and missed compared to other pitchers' sliders, has primarily 12-6 movement, results in many more groundballs compared to other pitchers' sliders and has less than expected depth."

During the 2019 season, Matz made a minor adjustment to his pitching position, moving from the first base side of the mound to the middle, giving him greater comfort and improving his performance as a result.

== Personal life ==
Matz is married to Taylor Cain, a Christian music singer and guitar player who performs in the band CAIN with her siblings Madison and Logan Cain. Matz was introduced to Cain by fellow Mets player T. J. Rivera and his wife, Ashton, who attended college with Cain at Troy University in Alabama. Matz and Cain were married on December 9, 2017, in Nauvoo, Alabama. Fellow Mets players Jacob deGrom and Brandon Nimmo were in Matz's wedding party. Their first child, a daughter, was born in August 2022; a son was born one month prematurely in October 2024. Matz was likewise a groomsman in deGrom's wedding party. Cain lives in Nashville, Tennessee, and Matz stays there during the offseason. He also had an apartment in Long Island City for during the season while he played for the Mets.

Matz has been involved in various charitable efforts. In late 2015, Matz and Cain took a trip to Honduras to help impoverished children, a charity excursion through the foundation Hearts 2 Honduras. In April 2016, Matz started the charity initiative Tru 32, which honored first responders from the New York City Fire Department, New York City Police Department, and U.S. Military, inviting them to attend Mets games for free. The initiative was later expanded to offer scholarships for children of individuals who have died in the line of duty. The number 32 in the charity's name derives from Matz's jersey number.

Matz has also raised funds for Angela's House, a Long Island-based charity that helps families caring for children with special health care needs. Matz began an online program called "Steven's Strikeouts" to benefit Angela's House, and pledged to match the first $10,000 donated there. Due to his charitable efforts, Matz was nominated for the Major League Baseball Players Association's Man of the Year Award in 2017, and was the New York Mets' Marvin Miller Man of the Year nominee that year. He was also the Mets' 2018 nominee for the Roberto Clemente Award, which honors baseball players for community involvement, philanthropy, and positive contributions on and off the field. In May 2018, Matz participated in The Viscardi Center's Celebrity Sports Night to raise funds for the Albertson-based organization, which provides schools and training for children and adults with severe physical disabilities.

Matz considered becoming a firefighter as a child before pursuing a career in baseball, and even considered it as a possible alternative career while dealing with injuries early in his baseball career. Matz is a Christian and has spoken openly about his faith. He was raised as a non-practicing Lutheran, but after attending a Bible study group during his time in the minor leagues, he joined a non-denominational church, Calvary Chapel, in Queens. Matz has donated equipment to the Three Village Little League, where he played as a child, and has participated in baseball clinics at his Ward Melville High School alma mater. Matz likes Christian music, country music, and classic rock, as well as hunting and fishing. The Se-Port Deli in East Setauket, where Matz and his high school teammates often visited in their youths, has a hero sandwich named after Matz.
