= Earl L. Vandermeulen High School =

Coordinates: 40°56′25″N 73°04′14″W

Location
- 350 Old Post Road; Port Jefferson, New York; United States

Information
- Type: Public
- Established: 1894 (At Spring Street Building); 1933 (Current Location)
- School district: Port Jefferson School District
- Principal: Eric Haruthunian
- Grades: 9-12
- Enrollment: 328 (2023-2024)
- Colors: Purple, White, and Black
- Mascot: A King
- Accreditation: State of New York
- National ranking: 367
- Newspaper: The Mast
- Yearbook: The Crystal
- Website: http://www.portjeffschools.org

Earl L. Vandermeulen High School is a public secondary school in the Port Jefferson School District, located in Port Jefferson, New York.

== History and overview ==
The current school building was originally built by the Public Works Administration. Port Jefferson High School was renamed around 1960 in honor of Earl L. Vandermeulen, who served as principal from 1923 to 1960.

As of 2014, the current student body size (9th - 12th grade) is close to 400 students.

In the past, the school served a larger student population, including students from a number of other communities that did not have their own high schools. In 1933, for example, the school was also accepting students from Port Jefferson Station, Terryville, Belle Terre, Miller Place, Mount Sinai, Rocky Point, Wading River, Shoreham, Middle Island, West Middle Island, West Yaphank, Ridge, Coram, Selden, and Stony Brook. As surrounding communities began to open their own high schools with the spread of suburban growth into Suffolk County, this practice subsided, and finally ended with the opening of Mount Sinai High School in 1991. The last graduating class outside Port Jefferson from Mount Sinai graduated in June 1992.

== Academics ==
In 2008, the school was placed 127th on Newsweek Magazine's 1,300 top U.S. high schools list, which placed it first among schools ranked in Suffolk County and 20th among schools ranked in New York. According to 2007 data, 98.9% of school graduates earn a New York State Regent's diploma, 78.2% of graduates plan to attend 4 year college, and 19.5% plan to attend a 2-year college.

== Athletics ==
Earl L. Vandermeulen fields a number of varsity and junior varsity athletic teams in Section 11 (League 8) of the New York State Public High School Athletic Association, including the following sports:

Fall

- Football (Boys)
- Soccer (Boys and Girls)
- Volleyball (Girls)
- Gymnastics (Girls)
- Cross Country (Boys and Girls)
- Field Hockey (Girls)
- Golf (Coed)
- Cheerleading (Girls)
- Tennis (Girls)

Winter

- Basketball (Boys and Girls)
- Winter Track (Boys and Girls)
- Wrestling (Boys)
- Cheerleading (Girls)

Spring

- Baseball (Boys)
- Softball (Girls)
- Track (Boys and Girls)
- Lacrosse (Boys and Girls)
- Tennis (Boys and Girls)

== Notable alumni ==
- James F. Burke: Cornet soloist.
- Chris Colmer: National Football League player.
- Maurice DuBois: Television anchorman.
- Les Goodman: National Football League player.
- Toby Knight: National Basketball Association player.
- Steven Legendre: United States men's national artistic gymnastics team member & Nissen-Emery Award winner.
- Ed McMullen: U.S. ambassador to Switzerland and Liechtenstein.
- Martin Tankleff: Wrongfully convicted in the 1988 murder of his parents.
