= Centereach, New York =

- Hamlet and census-designated place
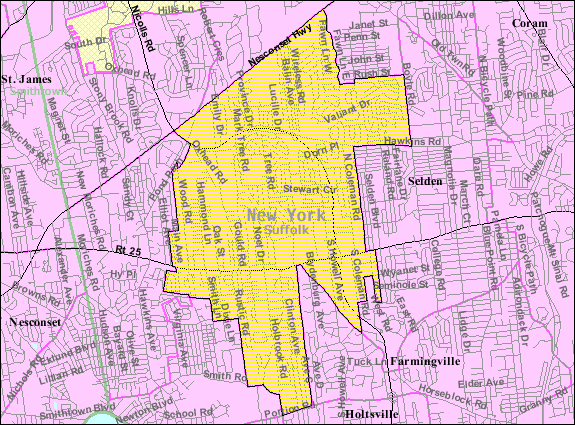
- U.S. Census map

- Location within the state of New York Centereach, New York (New York)
- Coordinates: 40°51′36.3″N 73°4′57.6″W
- Country: United States
- State: New York
- County: Suffolk
- Town: Brookhaven

Area
  - Total: 8.92 sq mi (23.10 km^{2})
  - Land: 8.92 sq mi (23.10 km^{2})
  - Water: 0 sq mi (0.00 km^{2})
- Elevation: 308 ft (94 m)

Population (2020)
  - Total: 30,980
  - Density: 3,474.1/sq mi (1,341.34/km^{2})
- Time zone: UTC-5:00 (Eastern Time Zone)
  - Summer (DST): UTC-4:00
- ZIP Code: 11720
- Area codes: 631, 934
- FIPS code: 36-13376
- GNIS feature ID: 0946206

Centereach (/ˈsɛntəritʃ/) is a hamlet and census-designated place in Suffolk County, New York, United States. As of the 2020 census, Centereach had a population of 30,980.

== History ==
The hamlet of Centereach was first called West Middle Island, but primarily became known as New Village until the early 20th century. When it was discovered that another village shared the same name, the name was changed to Centereach in 1916. The name Centereach reflects the centrality of the hamlet's location on Long Island, literally meaning "center reached".

Over the years Centereach has progressed from a small hamlet to a primarily suburban community. The population in 1940 was only 628, but the area had grown to nearly 20,000 residents by 1970.

The two earliest suburban developments, which began in the early 1950s, were Dawn Estates and Eastwood Village.

In 1998, the first single-point urban interchange in New York State was opened in Centereach, at Middle Country Road and Nicolls Road.

Centereach, historically a working-class area, has experienced a construction boom in the past decade. As of 2009, the median home price was $335,000. New construction in the Centereach area has resulted in an influx of residents with a higher median income.

== Geography ==
According to the United States Census Bureau, the CDP has a total area of 8.7 square miles (22.6 km^{2}), all land.

New York State Route 25 (Middle Country Road) passes through the community and is the primary commercial thoroughfare.

Centereach borders South Setauket, Terryville, Selden, Farmingville, Holtsville, Holbrook, Lake Ronkonkoma, Lake Grove and Stony Brook on Long Island.

== Transportation ==
=== Road ===
New York State Route 25 passes through Centereach, referred to as Middle Country Road in Centereach and surrounding areas. Middle Country Road serves as a major commercial thoroughfare, running east-west through Centereach.

County Route 97, known as Nicolls Road, passes through Centereach. While the freeway acts a north-south corridor throughout the majority of the county, Nicolls Road bends and runs east-west for a portion of its mileage in Centereach.

=== Rail ===
Centereach is not served directly by the Long Island Rail Road or any other rail transit. Residents typically utilize the nearby Ronkonkoma Station for rail transit.

=== Bus ===
Centereach is served by Suffolk County Transit. Route 58, which provides service from the Brentwood LIRR station to Riverhead, has multiple stops along Middle Country Road, providing access to commercial centers.

== Demographics ==
Historical population
Census	Pop.	Note	%±
1960	8,524		—
1970	9,427		10.6%
1980	30,136		219.7%
1990	26,720		−11.3%
2000	27,285		2.1%
2010	31,578		15.7%
2020	30,980		−1.9%
U.S. Decennial Census

=== 2020 census ===
As of the 2020 census, Centereach had a population of 30,980. The median age was 40.6 years. 20.4% of residents were under the age of 18 and 15.8% of residents were 65 years of age or older. For every 100 females there were 100.0 males, and for every 100 females age 18 and over there were 97.3 males age 18 and over.

100.0% of residents lived in urban areas, while 0.0% lived in rural areas.

There were 10,008 households in Centereach, of which 34.6% had children under the age of 18 living in them. Of all households, 59.7% were married-couple households, 13.2% were households with a male householder and no spouse or partner present, and 21.7% were households with a female householder and no spouse or partner present. About 17.3% of all households were made up of individuals and 9.9% had someone living alone who was 65 years of age or older.

There were 10,405 housing units, of which 3.8% were vacant. The homeowner vacancy rate was 1.0% and the rental vacancy rate was 6.4%.

Racial composition as of the 2020 census
Race	Number	Percent
White	22,169	71.6%
Black or African American	1,038	3.4%
American Indian and Alaska Native	106	0.3%
Asian	2,677	8.6%
Native Hawaiian and Other Pacific Islander	10	0.0%
Some other race	2,104	6.8%
Two or more races	2,876	9.3%
Hispanic or Latino (of any race)	5,147	16.6%

=== 2000 census ===
As of the 2000 census, there were 27,285 people, 8,176 households, and 6,998 families residing in the CDP. The population density was 3,429.4 inhabitants per square mile (1,324.1/km^{2}). There were 8,329 housing units at an average density of 1,046.8 per square mile (404.2/km^{2}). The racial makeup of the CDP was 75.36% White, Hispanic or Latino of any race were 14.08%, 4.98% African American, 0.18% Native American, 2.17% Asian, 0.01% Pacific Islander, 1.36% from other races, and 1.42% from two or more races.

There were 8,176 households, out of which 43.3% had children under the age of 18 living with them, 70.6% were married couples living together, 11.0% had a female householder with no husband present, and 14.4% were non-families. 10.3% of all households were made up of individuals, and 3.8% had someone living alone who was 65 years of age or older. The average household size was 3.27 and the average family size was 3.49.

In the CDP, the population was spread out, with 27.1% under the age of 18, 8.3% from 18 to 24, 32.1% from 25 to 44, 23.3% from 45 to 64, and 9.3% who were 65 years of age or older. The median age was 35 years. For every 100 females, there were 98.5 males. For every 100 females age 18 and over, there were 95.2 males.

=== Income ===
The median income for a household in the CDP was $86,445, and the median income for a family was $92,178 as of a 2007 estimate. Males had a median income of $49,167 versus $32,007 for females. The per capita income for the CDP was $23,197. About 3.7% of families and 5.6% of the population were below the poverty threshold, including 4.6% of those under age 18 and 14.2% of those age 65 or over.

== Schools ==
- Middle Country Central School District
- Sachem School District
- Centereach High School
- Dawnwood Middle School
- Three Village Central School District - covers the neighborhoods between Route 347, Nicholls Road, and Hawkins Ave. known as South Setauket.

== Notable people ==
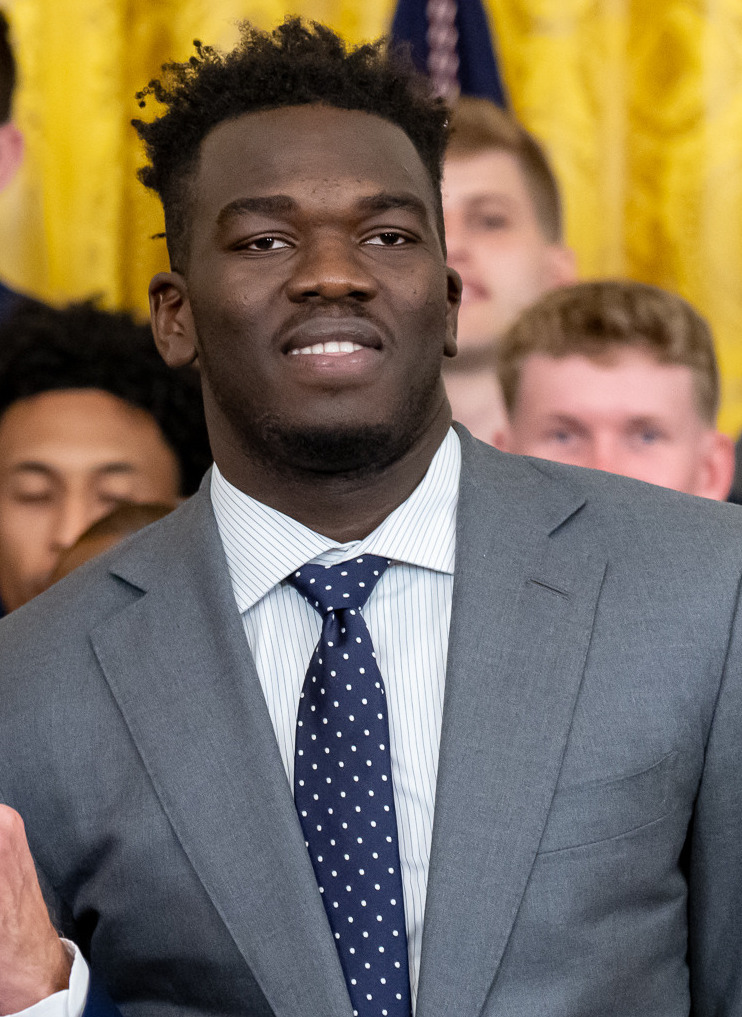
Adama Sanogo

- Lauren J. Fuchs, former field hockey midfielder at University of Connecticut and current field hockey coach; sister of Tracey Fuchs
- Tracey Fuchs (born 1966), former field hockey midfielder, participant in the 1988 and 1996 Olympic games, and current field hockey coach; sister of Lauren J. Fuchs
- Don Heck (1929-1995), comic-book artist, co-creator of Iron Man (born New York City, lived in Centereach as adult)
- Bert Heffernan (born 1965), former Major League Baseball player (Seattle Mariners) in the early 1990s
- Adama Sanogo (born 2002), Malian basketball player in the Israeli Basketball Premier League
