= East Setauket, New York =

- Hamlet and Census-designated place
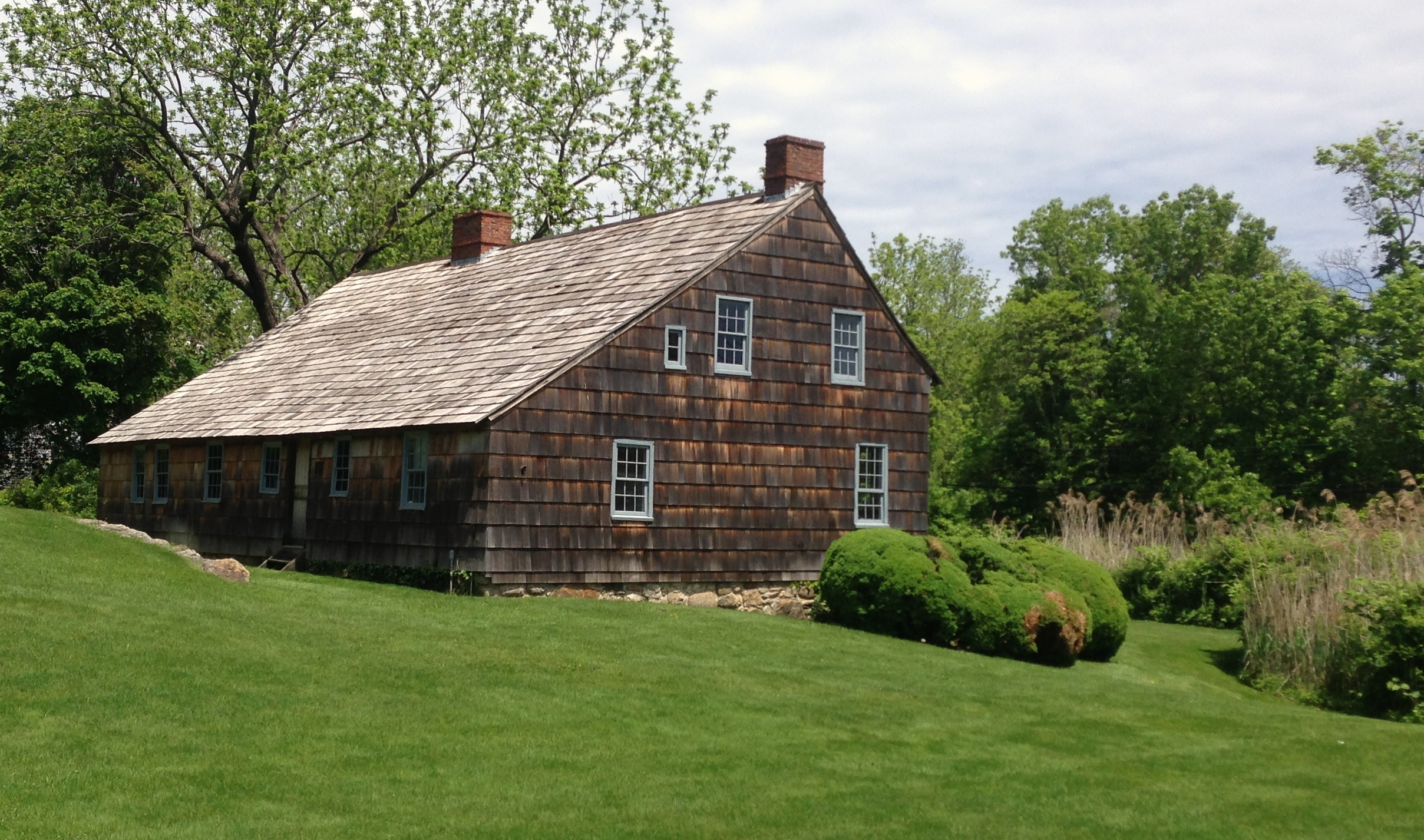
- The c. 1665 Brewster House, located within East Setauket

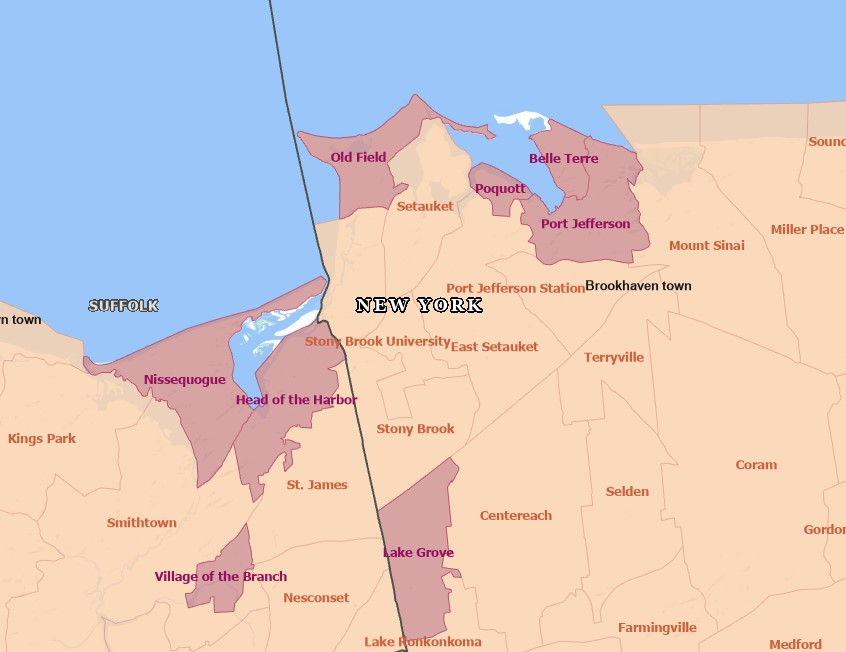
- U.S. Census map

- Location on Long Island Location within the state of New York
- Coordinates: 40°56′23″N 73°5′56″W
- Country: United States
- State: New York
- County: Suffolk
- Town: Brookhaven

Area
  - Total: 6.08 sq mi (15.74 km^{2})
  - Land: 6.02 sq mi (15.60 km^{2})
  - Water: 0.058 sq mi (0.15 km^{2})
- Elevation: 20 ft (6.1 m)

Population (2020)
  - Total: 10,998
  - Density: 1,826.4/sq mi (705.18/km^{2})
- Time zone: UTC−05:00 (Eastern Time Zone)
  - Summer (DST): UTC−04:00
- ZIP Code: 11733
- Area codes: 631, 934
- FIPS code: 36-22964
- GNIS feature ID: 2805098

East Setauket is a hamlet and census-designated place (CDP) in the Town of Brookhaven, in Suffolk County, on Long Island, New York, United States. It was first listed as a CDP in the 2020 census, at which time it had a population of 10,998. Before that, it was part of the Setauket–East Setauket CDP.

== Geography ==
According to the United States Census Bureau, the CDP has a total area of 6.08 square miles (15.7 km^{2}) – of which 6.02 square miles (15.6 km^{2}) is land and 0.06 square miles (0.16 km^{2}) is water.

East Setauket is located in northwestern Suffolk County, in the northwest part of the town of Brookhaven. It is bordered by Setauket to the northwest, Poquott to the north, Port Jefferson to the northeast, Port Jefferson Station to the east, Terryville to the southeast, South Setauket to the south, Stony Brook to the southwest, and Stony Brook University to the west.

== Demographics ==
=== 2020 census ===
As of the 2020 census, East Setauket had a population of 10,998. The median age was 43.8 years. 20.9% of residents were under the age of 18 and 19.4% of residents were 65 years of age or older. For every 100 females there were 92.6 males, and for every 100 females age 18 and over there were 93.4 males age 18 and over.

100.0% of residents lived in urban areas, while 0.0% lived in rural areas.

There were 3,891 households in East Setauket, of which 34.1% had children under the age of 18 living in them. Of all households, 61.8% were married-couple households, 12.1% were households with a male householder and no spouse or partner present, and 22.3% were households with a female householder and no spouse or partner present. About 19.0% of all households were made up of individuals and 9.7% had someone living alone who was 65 years of age or older.

There were 4,038 housing units, of which 3.6% were vacant. The homeowner vacancy rate was 1.3% and the rental vacancy rate was 4.6%.

Racial composition as of the 2020 census
Race	Number	Percent
White	8,689	79.0%
Black or African American	121	1.1%
American Indian and Alaska Native	36	0.3%
Asian	1,228	11.2%
Native Hawaiian and Other Pacific Islander	1	0.0%
Some other race	168	1.5%
Two or more races	755	6.9%
Hispanic or Latino (of any race)	799	7.3%

== Notable residents ==
- Dee Snider, singer-songwriter, screenwriter, radio personality, and actor; most famous for his role as the front man of the heavy metal band Twisted Sister.
