= Newfield High School =

Location
- 145 Marshall Drive; Selden, New York; United States
- Coordinates: 40°52′20″N 73°03′35″W

Information
- Type: Public
- Established: 1959
- School district: Middle Country
- Principal: Scott Graviano
- Teaching staff: 106.95 (FTE)
- Grades: 9-12
- Enrollment: 1,553 (2024–2025)
- Student to teacher ratio: 14.42
- Colors: Red, white, black, grey
- Mascot: Wolverine
- Accreditation: State of New York
- Website: nhs.mccsd.net

Newfield High School is a public high school in Selden, New York, United States. It is located one mile (1.6 km) north of Middle Country Road (Route 25) on Marshall Drive.

== History and overview ==
As suburban growth spread into central Suffolk county in the 1950s, the new Middle Country Central School District was created in 1957 from the merger of the Selden and Centereach school districts. Newfield opened in 1959 to serve the growing population, as neither district had ever had a high school. Before its opening, upper-level students had been sent to Port Jefferson High School.

Newfield's name is derived from the former names of both Centereach (which adjoins Selden and is part of the same school district) and Selden; New Village and Westfield.

It has always served as secondary school, currently educating students from the 9th through 12th grade. In the past, students from the 9th grade were educated at Selden Junior High School, and this changed when the Junior High formally became Selden Middle School and the 9th grade was passed on to Newfield.

== Athletics ==
Newfield fields a number of varsity and junior varsity athletic teams, in Section 11, Division 1 of the New York State Public High School Athletic Association, including baseball, basketball, bowling, cheerleading, cross country, fencing, field hockey, football, golf, gymnastics, lacrosse, swimming, soccer, softball, tennis, track & field, volleyball (girls), and wrestling.

Although team uniforms use the school's red and white colors, in the late 1990s, varsity teams began using black as a third color to distinguish from junior varsity.

On June 20, 2021, Newfield High Schools varsity baseball team, The Wolverines, won The Suffolk County Baseball championship for the first time.

== Notable alumni ==
- Sean Boyle, baseball player in the New York Yankees organization
- Rob Burnett, former professional football player who played 14 seasons in the NFL; member of 2000 Super Bowl champion Baltimore Ravens
- Linda Cohn, sportscaster and anchor of SportsCenter on ESPN
- Edward Donofrio, fencer who competed at the 1976 Summer Olympics
- Doug Drexler, visual effects artist, designer, sculptor, illustrator, and a makeup artist; Academy Award winner for Best Makeup for Dick Tracy
- Tom Leykis, talk radio personality best known for hosting The Tom Leykis Show from 1994 to 2009
- Elijah Riley, professional football player for the Pittsburgh Steelers
