= Chris Colmer =

American football offensive tackle (1980–2010)

Profile
- Position: Offensive tackle

Personal information
- Born: November 21, 1980; Port Jefferson, New York, U.S.
- Died: December 28, 2010 (aged 30)
- Listed height: 6 ft 5 in (1.96 m)
- Listed weight: 310 lb (141 kg)

Career information
- College: North Carolina State
- NFL draft: 2005: 3 / Pick 91st round

Career history
- 2005–2006: Tampa Bay Buccaneers

Awards and highlights
- Second-team All-ACC (2002)

Christopher James Colmer (November 21, 1980 – December 28, 2010) was an American professional football offensive tackle in the National Football League (NFL). He played for the Tampa Bay Buccaneers.

== Early life ==
Colmer graduated from Earl L. Vandermeulen High School, located in his hometown of Port Jefferson, New York. He was named to the All-Long Island squad and the Golden 50 All-State team, where he was a team captain playing tackle. He was also a USA Today honorable mention All-American.

== College career ==
Colmer went to college at North Carolina State and was the first person from his high school to earn a Division I scholarship in 27 years. In his junior year, he was co-winner of the teams' Jim Richter Award, giving annually by North Carolina State to the team's best offensive lineman. In 2003, he missed his college season due to Parsonage Turner Syndrome.

== Professional career ==
Colmer was selected in the third round with the 91st overall pick in the 2005 NFL draft. The Tampa Bay Buccaneers received this pick in a trade with the San Diego Chargers. He spent his entire rookie season in 2005 as a gameday inactive. During the 2006 offseason, he suffered another bout of Parsonage–Turner syndrome and spent the entire year on injured reserve.

He was released in June 2007 after failing a physical.

== Death ==
Colmer was teaching as a technology teacher at Little Flower U.F.S.D. and coaching at Centereach High School on Long Island in New York, when he died at the age of thirty on December 28, 2010.
