= Rob Burnett (American football) =

American football player (born 1967)

No. 90
- Position: Defensive end

Personal information
- Born: August 27, 1967 (age 59); East Orange, New Jersey, U.S.
- Listed height: 6 ft 4 in (1.93 m)
- Listed weight: 267 lb (121 kg)

Career information
- High school: Newfield (Selden, New York)
- College: Syracuse
- NFL draft: 1990: 5th round, 129th overall pick

Career history
- Cleveland Browns (1990–1995); Baltimore Ravens (1996–2001); Miami Dolphins (2002–2003)

Awards and highlights
- Super Bowl champion (XXXV); Second-team All-Pro (2000); Pro Bowl (1994); 2× First-team All-East (1988, 1989); Second-team All-East (1987)

Career NFL statistics
- Tackles: 603
- Sacks: 73
- Interceptions: 1
- Stats at Pro Football Reference

Robert Barry Burnett (born August 27, 1967) is an American former professional football player who was a defensive end for 14 seasons in the National Football League (NFL). He played college football for the Syracuse Orange.

== Early life and college ==
Born in East Orange, New Jersey, Burnett attended Newfield High School located on Long Island, New York. He played college football at Syracuse University, where he was a four-year letterman, and was a semifinalist for the Lombardi Award in 1989, his senior year.

== Professional career ==
Burnett was drafted in the fifth round with the 129th pick in the 1990 NFL Draft by the Cleveland Browns, with whom Burnett made his only Pro Bowl. He played there until the Browns moved to Baltimore, when he became a member of the Ravens. Playing for the Baltimore Ravens into 2001, Burnett earned a Super Bowl Ring when the Ravens defeated the New York Giants in Super Bowl XXXV. Due to salary cap issues, Burnett was not brought back by the Ravens after 2001. After playing two more seasons with the Miami Dolphins, Burnett retired.

== After football ==
In 2006, Rob Burnett became a commentator for WBAL-AM, specifically covering Baltimore Ravens games. Burnett was present during the Ravens' Super Bowl XXXV reunion, in 2010.

Burnett was inducted into the Suffolk Sports Hall of Fame on Long Island in the Football Category with the Class of 2001.
