= Comsewogue School District =

School district in the U.S. state of New York

Location
- Town of Brookhaven Suffolk County, New York; United States

District information
- Type: Public
- Grades: PK-12
- Established: 1874
- Superintendent: Jennifer Quinn
- Schools: 6

Students and staff
- Students: 3,447
- District mascot: Spartans
- Colors: Blue and Gold

Other information
- District Offices: 290 Norwood Avenue Port Jefferson Station, NY 11776
- Website: www.comsewogue.k12.ny.us

Brookhaven-Comsewogue Union Free School District (pronounced Kom-sah-wohg) serves students in parts of Port Jefferson Station, East Setauket, Terryville, Coram, Selden, Mount Sinai, and Port Jefferson on the North Shore of Long Island, in Brookhaven Town, Suffolk County, New York, United States.

== History ==
=== Early history ===
Comsewogue comes from a language used by the Setalcott or Setauket Native Americans who were native to the area. It means "place where paths come together." The district originally opened as the Terryville-Comsewogue School District in 1871. In 1874, the first school in Terryville was opened on Terryville Road. The district utilized a school known as both The Comsewogue School and The Terryville-Port Jefferson Station Union Free School, which had an auditorium and a classroom for every grade added in 1930. Previously, the school used four classrooms for eight grades (first through eighth). Schools in the district underwent a variety of names, including Terryville-Port Jefferson Station, Port Jefferson Station-Terryville, Comsewogue, and Port Jefferson Station-Comsewogue.

=== District mascot ===
In 1971, Comsewogue High School was opened. Previously the district had the Spartans as their mascot. Following the opening of the high school, the mascot became the Warriors. This was until 2025, when by order of New York State, they removed the Native American inspired mascot. They reverted to the Spartans, decided by a process including students, teachers, and others related to Comsewogue.

=== Restructuring of elementary schools ===
Prior to the 2012–2013 school year, the district restructured their elementary schools. Previously, the Boyle Road, Terryville Road, Clinton Avenue, and Norwood Avenue schools all served students K-5. This was changed to what is known as the "Princeton Plan." The Princeton Plan features a move from K-5 schools to separate schools grades K-2 and 3–5. Despite the failure of the budget featuring the Princeton Plan, the district still implemented the plan making Boyle Road and Terryville Road both 3-5 schools and Clinton Avenue and Norwood Avenue K-2 schools.

=== Recent history ===
Richard T. Brande retired as Superintendent after the 2005–06 school year and was replaced by deputy superintendent Shelley Saffer. The deputy superintendent was former Comsewogue High School principal, Dr. Joseph Rella until 2010, when Shelley Saffer retired and Joseph Rella became Superintendent. Both during and after their time as superintendent, Brande and Saffer were some of the highest earners among school employees in all of Long Island and even New York State. Former Comsewogue High School principal, Jennifer Reph, then became deputy superintendent. Rella retired in 2019, and passed away the following year. He was replaced by Jennifer Quinn, who is the current superintendent.

== Schools ==
The following is a table of all the schools in the Brookhaven-Comsewogue Union Free School District.

School name	Type of school	Address	Grades	Principal
Comsewogue High School	High School	565 Bicycle Path Port Jefferson Station, NY 11776	9-12	Michael Mosca, Ed.D.
John F. Kennedy Middle School	Middle School	200 Jayne Boulevard Port Jefferson Station, NY 11776	6-8	Amanda Prinz, Ed.D.
Boyle Road Elementary School	Intermediate School	424 Boyle Road Port Jefferson Station, NY 11776	3-5	Nicole Sooknanan, Ed.D.
Terryville Road Elementary School	Intermediate School	401 Terryville Road Port Jefferson Station, NY 11776	3-5	Annemarie Sciove, Ed.D.
Clinton Avenue Elementary School	Elementary School	140 Clinton Avenue Port Jefferson Station, NY 11776	K-2	Robert Pearl
Norwood Avenue Elementary School	Elementary School	290 Norwood Avenue Port Jefferson Station, NY 11776	K-2	Nichole Makarius

== Comsewogue sports ==
Baseball - Suffolk County Champions (1970, 1973, and 1982), State Champions (1982)

Softball - State Champions (1985)

Football- Rutgers/Suffolk County Champions (1990) Suffolk County Champions (1990, 1994, and 1996) Long Island Champions (1996)

Adam Mariano - Wrestling State Champion (1988, 1989)

Men's Lacrosse State Champions (1998, 2002)

Men's Soccer State Champions (2008, 2009)

=== 2008 ===
- Boys Varsity Soccer, Suffolk County Class A Champion, New York State Class A Champion

=== 2009 ===
- Boys Varsity Soccer, Suffolk County Class A Champion, Long Island Champion, State Champions

== Notable alumni ==
- Clinton Kelly from TLC's What Not to Wear.
- Bill Klein from TLC's The Little Couple
- Tim Cummings
- Kevin Cassese (lacrosse player)
- Cpl. Steven J. Crowley (Marine guard killed in the 1979 terror attack on the U.S. Embassy in Islamabad)
- James K. Lyons (film editor, screenwriter and actor)
- R.A. the Rugged Man (hip-hop artist and filmmaker)
- Nick Mamatas (author)
- Nick Kiriazis (actor)
- Robert Liberman (author)
