= Les Goodman =

American football player (born 1950)

No. 25
- Position: Halfback

Personal information
- Born: October 1, 1950; Port Jefferson, New York, U.S.
- Died: August 9, 2012 (aged 61)
- Listed height: 5 ft 11 in (1.80 m)
- Listed weight: 205 lb (93 kg)

Career information
- High school: Port Jefferson
- College: Yankton
- NFL draft: 1972: 3rd round, 67th overall pick

Career history
- Atlanta Falcons (1972); Green Bay Packers (1973-1974)

Career NFL statistics
- Rushing attempts: 38
- Rushing yards: 189
- Rushing TDs: 1
- Stats at Pro Football Reference

Les Goodman (born September 1, 1950) is an American former professional football player who was a running back in the National Football League (NFL). He played professionally for the Atlanta Falcons and the Green Bay Packers.

== Early life ==
Goodman was born Leslie Edward Goodman Jr. in Port Jefferson, New York, and graduated from Port Jefferson High School. He played college football at Yankton College, where he was a teammate of future All-Pro defensive end Lyle Alzado.

== Career ==
Goodman was selected 67th overall in the third round of the 1972 NFL draft by the Atlanta Falcons. He played two seasons with the Green Bay Packers.
