= Lauren J. Fuchs =

American field hockey player

Lauren J. Fuchs is a former field hockey midfielder from the United States who played for the University of Connecticut and has coached at the Division I and III levels since 1981.

== Career ==
=== Playing and captaincy ===
A former street hockey player on Long Island, she played high school field hockey for the Centereach High School Cougars. She was one of four sisters—Dana, Jill, and Tracey were the others—to play for National Federation of State High School Associations (NFHS) hall of famer Nancy Cole. All four Fuchs sisters were team captains.

Fuchs graduated from Connecticut in 1981 with a Bachelor's degree in physical education. Fuchs was a four-year starter and All-American at Connecticut, leading the Huskies to post-season play each year, and she served as team captain her senior season. She also was a four-year starter and All-Regional softball player at Connecticut, and she captained that team as a senior as well.

=== Coaching ===
Fuchs’ began coaching at the collegiate level in 1981, when she joined her alma mater, University of Connecticut, as an assistant coach after graduating. She also served as an assistant softball coach for the Huskies in 1984. Fuchs later spent six years in the America East as an assistant coach at both New Hampshire (1987–1990) and Northeastern (1991–1993).

Starting in 1994, Fuchs began a 12-year coaching stint with the Temple University Owls. There she became the second-winningest coach in program history. During that time, they appeared in the Atlantic-10 Tournament nine times, including a conference championship in 1994. That season she was named A-10 Coach of the Year. In 1998, she was named NCAA Division I Coach of the Year.

In 2006, Fuchs went on to coach at University of Maryland – Baltimore County. At the conclusion of the season, however, the athletic department had to cut its varsity program faced with a widening budget deficit. In 2007, Fuchs joined the Swarthmore College Garnet as an assistant coach, and in 2008 was named head coach.

In addition, Fuchs has also served as a United States Olympic Development Program coach since 1986, and she was named United States Olympic Committee National Field Hockey Coach of the Year in 1998. A USFHA Level One coaching education instructor, Fuchs has been the head coach of the regional USFHA summer league team for the last eight years. She has also been the head coach of the under-20 national team and the futures program, as well as an assistant coach with the under-23 national team, and she coordinates U.S. Olympic Development tryouts.

In her coaching career, Fuchs has tutored 11 All-Americans and 28 First Team All-Conference selections. She has also demonstrated success in the realms of Fall and Spring Tennis, coaching notable athletes including Noah E. Morrison.
