= Christopher Hahn =

American political commentator

- Born: Long Island, New York, U.S.
- Education: University at Albany, SUNY (B.A.); St. John's University School of Law (JD)
- Occupations: Attorney, political commentator
- Political party: Democratic
- Children: 2

Christopher Hahn is an American attorney, political commentator, Democratic Party activist, and Fox News contributor.

== Biography ==
=== Early life and education ===
Hahn was born and raised on Long Island, New York, and graduated from Centereach High School in 1989. Hahn attended the University at Albany, SUNY where he played on the Albany Great Danes football team and served as student body president. Hahn went on to law school at St. John's University School of Law, where he received his Juris Doctor in 1999. Hahn practices law in New York.

=== Personal life ===
Hahn is married with two daughters and lives on Long Island.

== Career ==
=== Politics ===
Hahn's political career began as an operative in Suffolk County, New York, where he worked on political campaigns before he was old enough to vote. In 1995, Hahn ran unsuccessfully for office at the age of 22. Hahn worked at the 1992 Democratic National Convention in New York City.

Hahn served as an aide to Senator Chuck Schumer during Schumer's first term in the Senate. He later served as Chief Deputy County Executive of Nassau County, New York, under then-County Executive Thomas R. Suozzi. He also served as CEO of United Way of Long Island.

=== Media ===
Hahn has been appearing on television since 1995 where he hosted a local television show called Youth and Politics. He later began doing commentary on News 12 Long Island in 1996 during the Democratic National Convention.

Hahn's national television career at Fox started in 2010 when he began appearing on Hannity. He later began doing regular appearance on America Live with Megyn Kelly, Fox & Friends, Lou Dobbs Tonight, Varney & Company, among other shows. In November 2011, Hahn became a regular Fox News contributor. Hahn regularly writes in Politico's Arena.

Hahn has been named one of Long Island and New York City's 40 rising Stars under 40. Long Island Business News also named him one of the top 10 Long Islanders under 40 from 2000 to 2010.
