= Middle Country Central School District =

School district in the U.S. state of New York

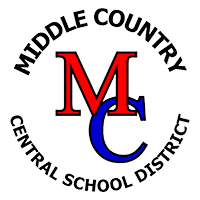

Location
- Brookhaven, New York United States

District information
- Motto: to empower and inspire all students
- Grades: PreK-12
- Established: 1957
- President: Justin Katz
- Superintendent: Roberta A. Gerold, Ed.D.
- Schools: 15

Students and staff
- Students: 9,507
- Student–teacher ratio: 15:1

Other information
- Website: www.mccsd.net

The Middle Country Central School District (MCCSD) covers approximately 16 square miles (41 km^{2}) on Long Island in the Town of Brookhaven, Suffolk County, New York, United States.

It is composed of parts of Centereach, Selden, Lake Grove, Coram, Stony Brook, Terryville, and Farmingville.

The district is currently composed of eight elementary schools, two pre-K/kindergarten Centers, two middle schools, and two high schools. The K-12 student enrollment projection for the 2009/10 school year was approximately 11,000 plus over 500 pre-kindergarten students.

== History ==
Middle Country Central School District was formed in 1957 through the consolidation of the Centereach and Selden school districts (also known as School Districts 11 and 12 at the time, respectively). At the time, it consisted of five kindergarten rooms and 51 elementary classrooms.

At the time of consolidation, the area was going through unprecedented growth due to suburban spread. In 1954, for example, the Centereach School District faced a classroom-shortage crisis. It was solved only when local home developers (whose buyers and new area residents were causing the crisis) volunteered to build ten "one room schoolhouses" in one month's time, with a plan to later convert the buildings into residences. This "Unity Drive" project name was adopted by the elementary school (now a Pre-K/Kindergarten center) built nearby a few years later.

Suburban growth resulted in Middle Country becoming the fastest growing school district in the state.

The student population peaked in 1976 at 16,738.

== Schools ==
=== High schools ===
- Centereach High School
- Newfield High School

=== Middle schools ===
- Dawnwood Middle School is located at 10 43rd Street in Centereach. It educates around 1,200 students in grades 6-8 under principal Mr. Daniel Katchihtes and assistant principals Ms. Sara Oshrin and Ms. Jessica Ragazzi. They were formerly known as the "Dragons" but, they are now known as the "Cougars". The "Cougars" are also the mascot of Centereach High School. The name "Dawnwood" derives from two of the early suburban developments in Centereach, Dawn Estates and Eastwood Village. Most students of Dawnwood go to Centereach High School after eighth grade.
- Selden Middle School is located at 22 Jefferson Avenue in Centereach. It educates students in grades 6-8 under principal Mr. Salvatore Merenda and assistant principals Ms. Kristine Pitera and Mr. Brian McCarthy. Formerly known as the “Sailors” then "Seahawks", they are now known as the "Wolverines". Most students of Selden Middle School go to Newfield High School after eighth grade.

In both schools, in sixth grade, each student is assigned to a 'team' of, typically, three or more teachers, each teaching an essential academic class. The students typically rotate teachers throughout the day. Other classes are taught by teachers not assigned to a team. During the 2010/2011 school year, the schools decided to rename their mascots to reflect their high school affiliates.

=== Elementary schools ===
- Eugene Auer Memorial Elementary Schools
- Hawkins Path Elementary School
- Holbrook Road Elementary School
- Jericho Elementary School
- New Lane Elementary School
- North Coleman Road Elementary School
- Oxhead Road Elementary School
- Stagecoach Elementary School

=== Pre-K/Kindergarten Centers ===
- Bicycle Path Pre-K/Kindergarten Center
- Unity Drive Pre-K/Kindergarten Center

== Board of education ==
Current Board Members:

- Doreen Feldmann (Trustee, exp. 2026)
- Deborah Mann-Rodriguez (Trustee, exp. 2026)
- Lauren Talamo (Trustee, exp. 2026)
- Arlene Barresi (Trustee, exp. 2027)
- John Debenedetto (Trustee, exp. 2027)
- Denise Haggerty (Trustee, exp. 2027)
- Robert Feeney (Vice President/Trustee, exp. 2028)
- Robert Hallock (Trustee, exp. 2028)
- Dawn Sharrock (President/Trustee, exp. 2028)

Each member serves a three year term and all terms start at the first board meeting in July and expire on June 30. Typically, three of the nine members are up for election every year and the school board election takes place on the 3rd Tuesday in May.
