= Lawrence Aviation Industries, Inc. =

Former aircraft parts manufacturer and current Superfund site

- Superfund site
- Location within New York
- Location: Port Jefferson Station, Suffolk County, New York; 40°56′04″N 73°03′55″W

Information
- CERCLIS ID: NYD002041531

Progress
- Proposed: October 22, 1999
- Listed: February 4, 2000

Lawrence Aviation Industries, Inc. (Lawrence Aviation) was an aircraft parts manufacturer that made titanium parts for military aircraft, such as the Grumman F-14 fighter jet. The former owner of the company, Gerald Cohen, was sentenced to one year and a day in prison and ordered to pay $105,816 in restitution for illegally storing more than 12 tons of hazardous waste on the company's grounds. The former site of the company, in the hamlet of Port Jefferson Station, Town of Brookhaven, New York, is one of the most contaminated sites on Long Island and may be responsible for a toxic groundwater plume in the region. The site is bounded by the Long Island Rail Road tracks and Sheep Pasture Road to the north. A Long Island Power Authority easement runs along the southern edge of the property, separating the site from a residential area. To the east and west are residential areas.

== History ==
Lawrence Aviation began operations as Ledkote Products in Port Jefferson Station in 1951 when the facility moved from New York City. The name was changed to Lawrence Aviation Industries in 1959. In May 1980, the Suffolk County Department of Health Services conducted a site visit to Lawrence Aviation Industries. During this visit many areas of concern were identified. There was an accumulation of drums, many improperly stored and in disrepair, in seven areas of the site. Unpermitted discharges of liquid waste were also noted. Unlined cesspools and lagoons were used to store liquid waste.

The Town of Brookhaven Department of Environmental Protection tested water from private wells near Lawrence Aviation for volatile organic compounds in 1979. Elevated levels of trichloroethene and cis-1,2-dichloroethene (DCE) were found. The source of contamination was unknown at the time. In 1987, four private wells downgradient of Lawrence Aviation were sampled. High levels of trichloroethene contamination were detected, as well as lower levels of tetrachloroethene and cis-1,2-dichloroethene. Contaminant levels exceeded the NYSDOH public drinking water guidelines. The USEPA supplied bottled water until the homes were connected to the public water supply. Since then, additional contaminated private wells were discovered and connected to the public water supply. Groundwater investigations detected volatile organic compound contamination downgradient of the site. Also, trichloroethene was detected in a downgradient stream and pond.

The 2005 Public Health Assessment for the Lawrence Aviation site contained several recommendations, including further investigation to define the extent of the contaminated groundwater plume; assessment of the potential for soil vapor intrusion related to contaminated soil or groundwater at and near the site; and, evaluation of remedial strategies to address any contamination found.
