= Centereach High School =

High school in Centereach, New York

Coordinates: 40°52′30″N 73°05′14″W

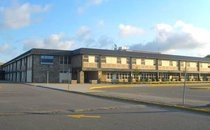

Location
- 14–43rd Street; Centereach, New York; United States

Information
- Type: Public high school
- Motto: "empower and inspire all students to apply the knowledge, skills, and attitudes necessary to be creative problem solvers, to achieve personal success, and to contribute responsibly in a diverse and dynamic world"
- Established: 1970; 56 years ago
- School district: Middle Country Central School District
- Principal: Thomas Bell
- Teaching staff: 116.40 (FTE)
- Grades: 9–12
- Enrollment: 1,464 (2023–2024)
- Student to teacher ratio: 12.58
- Colors: Blue; White
- Mascot: Cougars
- Rival: Newfield High School
- Newspaper: Cross Currents
- Yearbook: Déjà Vu
- Website: https://chs.mccsd.net/

Centereach High School is a public high school in the Middle Country Central School District located in Centereach, Suffolk County, Long Island, New York. It teaches a college preparatory curriculum for grades nine through twelve. The total minority enrollment is 26%, and 33% of students are economically disadvantaged. Centereach High School is 1 of 2 high schools in the Middle Country Central School District.

As of the 2014–15 school year, the school had an enrollment of 1,552 students and 106.5 classroom teachers (on an FTE basis), for a student–teacher ratio of 14.6:1. There were 308 students (19.8% of enrollment) eligible for free lunch and 115 (7.4% of students) eligible for reduced-cost lunch.

== History ==
Centereach High School opened in 1969, to serve the continuing population growth in central Suffolk County and in the Middle Country Central School District.

== Academics ==
Students have the opportunity to take Advanced Placement® coursework and exams. The AP® participation rate at Centereach High School is 40%.

According to 2007 data, 97.8% of Centereach graduates earn a New York State Regent's diploma. 53.3 percent of graduates plan to attend 4 year college, and 40.8% plan to attend a 2-year college.

In 2019 Niche School Rankings, assessed Centereach High School at an overall grade of A−. Centereach High was ranked as #2,861 in Best Public High Schools in America, #212 out of 1,236 in New York State and #29 out of 59 in Suffolk County.

== Planetarium ==
Opened in 1971, the Stephen I. Tupper planetarium hosts a variety of shows and serves as an integral part of the elementary science curriculum, receiving its funding through the school budget and currently operated through Western Suffolk BOCES. It boasts a 12.2 m dome, seating for 120, and a projector nicknamed Sidney, which is a model A4 Spitz Star Projector manufactured in Chadds Ford, PA.

== Athletics ==
Centereach fields a number of varsity and junior varsity athletic teams, in Section 11, Division 2 of the New York State Public High School Athletic Association, including Baseball, Basketball, Bowling, Cheerleading, Cross Country, Fencing, Field Hockey, Football, Golf, Gymnastics, Lacrosse, Soccer, Softball, Tennis, Track & Field, Volleyball (Girls), and Wrestling.

In the fall of 1995, the cross country team (a joint Middle Country team with Newfield High School) won its first state Federation title.

The October 29, 2007 issue of Sports Illustrated ran a story about Centereach's football team being a favored pick for its opponent's homecoming games because of its poor record in recent seasons.

Centereach has an Ice Hockey team that is not involved with the school, but is in the NYSAHA.

In 2017 Centereach High School began a renovation of the boys and girls locker room which was completed for the 2017 -2018 school year. According to Joseph Mercado, the Director of Health, “this will be the first time that the gym has been renovated since the school’s construction in 1970.” He explained that the “goal [of these new locker rooms] is to infuse school spirit into the new facility by incorporating the school’s color theme.” The new blue and black lockers with the white tiled floor and blue sparkles definitely capture Centereach's blue and white spirit. The cost of these renovations are estimated at $581,000. In addition to the locker room renovations, two team rooms will be renovated at a cost of approximately $370,000. The district also began construction on a new auxiliary gym to be located on the former tennis courts and obstacle course area in 2017. The cost of this gym is estimated at $370,000.

== Notable alumni ==
- Tracey Fuchs – Olympic Athlete, former field hockey midfielder for the 1988 and 1996 summer games
- Steven D. Smith – New Hampshire politician and a member of the New Hampshire House of Representatives representing Sullivan County District 11
- Zelina Vega – Professional wrestler, currently signed to the WWE, performing for their Smackdown brand
- Christopher Hahn - political commentator, television and radio personality
- Christian Van Horn - operatic bass-baritone

== Events of note ==
In January 1997, 30-year-old New York City firefighter James Halversen was shot and killed while jogging around the Centereach High School track, in a random act of violence. This unfortunate event gave rise to stories about a portion of the track being "haunted," so much so that it has drawn paranormal investigators to the site.
