= Selden, New York =

- Hamlet and census-designated place
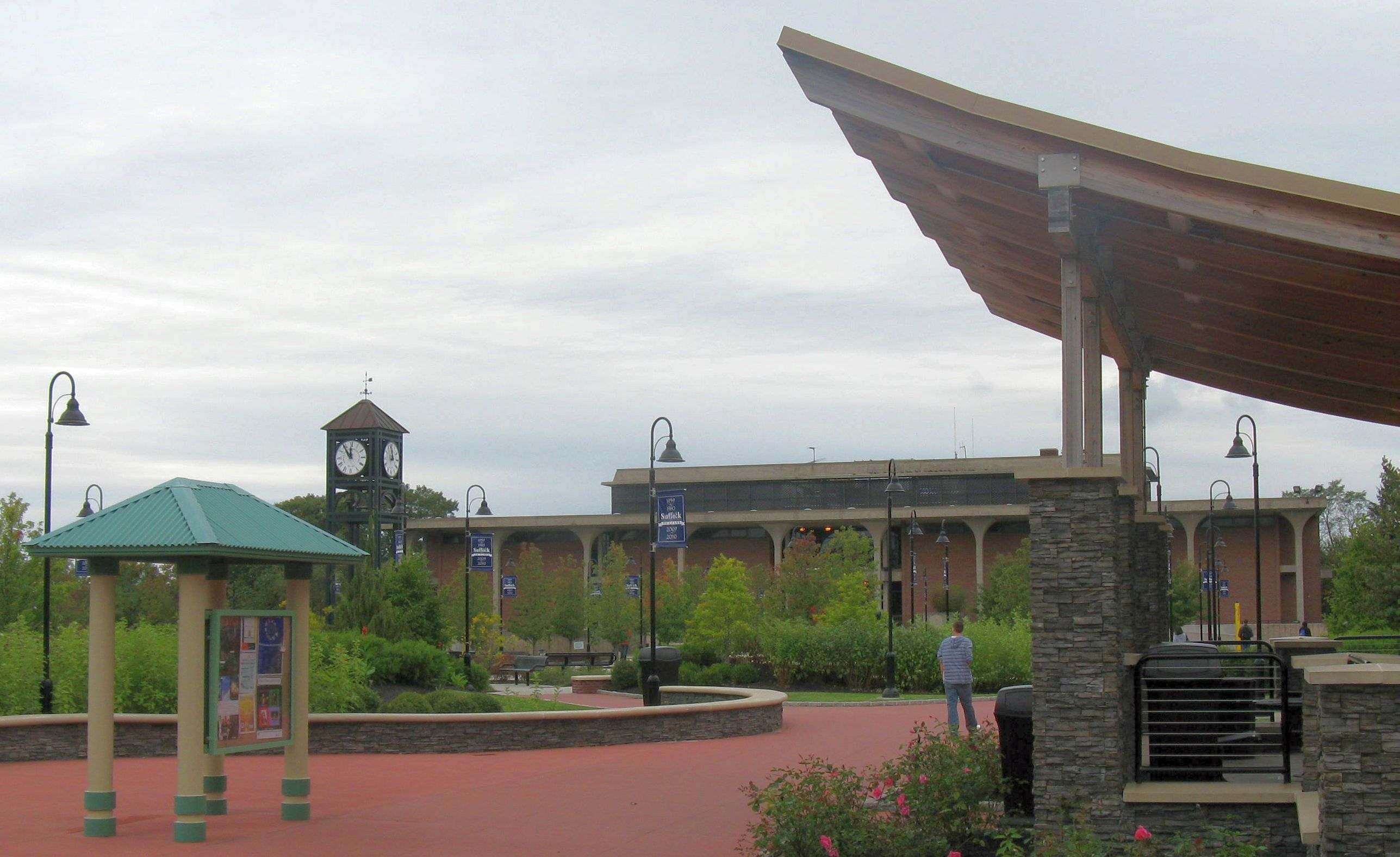
- The Selden Campus of Suffolk County Community College, located within the hamlet

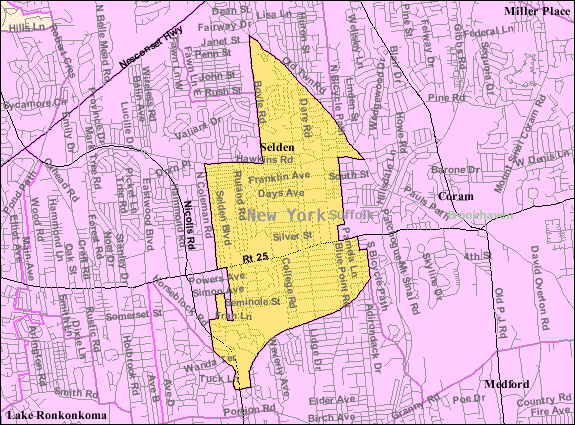
- U.S. census map of Selden

- Location on Long Island Location within the state of New York
- Coordinates: 40°52′15″N 73°2′49″W
- Country: United States
- State: New York
- County: Suffolk
- Town: Brookhaven
- Named after: Henry R. Selden

Area
  - Total: 4.55 sq mi (11.78 km^{2})
  - Land: 4.55 sq mi (11.78 km^{2})
  - Water: 0 sq mi (0.00 km^{2})
- Elevation: 89 ft (27 m)

Population (2020)
  - Total: 21,262
  - Density: 4,674.0/sq mi (1,804.66/km^{2})
- Time zone: UTC−05:00 (Eastern Time Zone)
  - Summer (DST): UTC−04:00
- ZIP Code: 11784
- Area codes: 631, 934
- FIPS code: 36-66212
- GNIS feature ID: 0964814

Selden (historically known as Westfield) is a hamlet and census-designated place (CDP) in the Town of Brookhaven in Suffolk County, New York, United States. The population was 21,262 at the time of the 2020 census.

== History ==
=== Early settlement ===
The farmers who first moved to what is now Selden in the mid-18th century referred to the area as "Westfield" (or sometimes as Westfields). One of the better known early residents was Captain Daniel Roe (1740–1820), who fought in the French and Indian War and served as a captain in the Revolutionary War, and for whom Captain Daniel Roe Highway is named. Roe built a house in Selden along Middle Country Road before the Revolutionary War. Roe is buried in a small family cemetery south of Middle Country Road behind the Old Westfield shopping center.

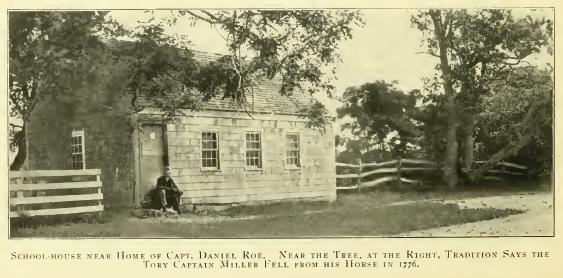
From The Diary of Captain Daniel Roe, 1806–08 (1904), caption reads: "School house near home of Capt. Daniel Roe. Near the tree, at the right, tradition says the Tory Captain Richard Miller fell from his horse in 1776."

Roe sided with the Patriots in the lead-up to the Revolutionary War. In the fall of 1776, Roe was assigned to lead a raid against the Tory and Hessian detachment near Selden led by his cousin Richard Miller. Miller was a wanted man, and Roe himself had pledged 10 pounds of the bounty offered for Miller's capture. When Miller rode right by Roe's house in uniform, he was confronted by Roe's men and ordered to dismount. Instead, Miller fired his pistol and turned to flee, whereupon he was shot by the militiamen. Miller was then carried into Roe's house, where he died.

=== 19th-century farm community ===
A school district for the Westfield area was first created in 1815, carved out of the districts for New Village (now Centereach) and Coram. Originally named District 25, it was renumbered as District 12 in 1842, which it remained until the formation of the Middle Country Central School District in 1957.

When a post office was opened in 1852, Westfield had already been taken as a name by a community upstate. Upstate attorney (and later judge) Henry Selden promised to do "something handsome" if the community named itself after him. The name was adopted, though it is usually said to be unknown whether he ever followed through on his promise, and probably did not. While some sources report that the attorney had no known connection to the community, one newspaper reported in 1858 that Selden and attorney Edward Boyle (the namesake for Boyle Road) acquired a large tract of land in the hamlet shortly before the post office opened, and started to develop it.

As of 1885, Selden was home to 88 residents and a Presbyterian church (built in 1857), and noted for producing melons and early garden vegetables from its farms. Around 1897, the popular cross-island Bicycle Path was completed and ran through Selden. A popular stop along the path, "Wheelmen's Rest", was in Selden and run by Albert Norton.

=== Twentieth century and growth ===
The Selden home of Daniel Roe, From The Diary of Captain Daniel Roe, 1806–1808 (1904)

In 1916, the Suffolk County Tuberculosis Sanatorium opened on land then considered to be part of Holtsville. The location, including some of its original buildings, became in 1961 the main (Ammerman) campus of Suffolk County Community College, which today has an enrollment of over 11,000 students.

From 1919 to 1959, Telescope Hill on the south side of Selden was the location of a fire lookout tower. During World War II, a German U-boat spotted from Telescope Hill was later captured but not identified.

In 1935, a new public school building was built near the same location as the prior school building, near the intersection of Bicycle Path and Middle Country Road. That building was renovated in the 1980s and became a branch of the Middle Country Public Library.

The main thoroughfare, Middle Country Road, was paved from Smithtown and through Selden to Coram around 1927–1928. The rural nature of Selden soon began to change, when in 1931 (when it had around 131 residents), real estate agents began marketing small lots to New York City residents as retreats from urban living, in a development called "Nature's Gardens". This was located on the south side of Middle Country Road and Evergreen Drive. Suburban development increased in earnest in the early 1950s, and by the early 1970s Selden had become a primarily suburban community.

=== Commercial development ===
The primary road in the hamlet, and the location of most of the commercial development, is New York State Route 25 (Middle Country Road), which runs east to west. Similar to surrounding communities, Selden has a number of shopping centers along Middle Country Road, which developed as suburban growth spread eastward.

In 1972, the first Westfield Shopping Center opened at the intersection of Middle Country and Blue Point roads, with a Hills Supermarkets location.

In 1975, College Plaza opened at the northeast corner of the Middle Country Road and Boyle Road intersection. Its original anchor tenants included King Kullen, Builders Emporium, and Genovese Drug Stores.

Selden Plaza, at the intersection of Middle Country and County Route 83 (in Coram but within the Selden ZIP Code), opened in 1978.

In 1992, a new major shopping center, Independence Plaza, opened at the northwest corner of Middle Country and Boyle Roads, adjacent to College Plaza. As of 2009, plans had been made to develop a town center in and around Independence Plaza. This has significantly increased the popularity of "Downtown Selden" in the past few years attracting more local and national chain businesses.

== Geography ==
According to the United States Census Bureau, the CDP has a total area of 4.3 square miles (11.2 km^{2}), all land.

Selden is bordered by Coram to the east, Farmingville to the south, Centereach to the west, and Terryville to the north.

== Demographics ==
Historical population
Census	Pop.	Note	%±
1950	1,743		—
1960	1,604		−8.0%
1970	11,613		624.0%
1980	17,259		48.6%
1990	20,608		19.4%
2000	21,861		6.1%
2010	19,851		−9.2%
2020	21,262		7.1%
U.S. Decennial Census

=== 2020 census ===
As of the 2020 census, Selden had a population of 21,262. The median age was 40.0 years. 21.0% of residents were under the age of 18 and 15.7% of residents were 65 years of age or older. For every 100 females there were 95.8 males, and for every 100 females age 18 and over there were 93.2 males age 18 and over.

100.0% of residents lived in urban areas, while 0.0% lived in rural areas.

There were 6,838 households in Selden, of which 34.6% had children under the age of 18 living in them. Of all households, 55.4% were married-couple households, 14.9% were households with a male householder and no spouse or partner present, and 23.5% were households with a female householder and no spouse or partner present. About 18.8% of all households were made up of individuals and 9.4% had someone living alone who was 65 years of age or older.

There were 7,167 housing units, of which 4.6% were vacant. The homeowner vacancy rate was 1.6% and the rental vacancy rate was 4.7%.

Racial composition as of the 2020 census
Race	Number	Percent
White	14,930	70.2%
Black or African American	949	4.5%
American Indian and Alaska Native	61	0.3%
Asian	1,499	7.1%
Native Hawaiian and Other Pacific Islander	3	0.0%
Some other race	1,756	8.3%
Two or more races	2,064	9.7%
Hispanic or Latino (of any race)	4,129	19.4%

=== 2000 census ===
As of the 2000 census, there were 21,861 people, 6,809 households, and 5,522 families residing in the CDP. The population density was 4,695.5 inhabitants per square mile (1,812.9/km^{2}). There were 7,083 housing units at an average density of 1,521.3 per square mile (587.4/km^{2}). The racial makeup of the CDP was 91.96% White, 1.88% African American, 0.19% Native American, 2.46% Asian, 0.02% Pacific Islander Americans, 1.78% from other races, and 1.72% from two or more races. Hispanic or Latino of any race were 8.23% of the population.

There were 6,809 households, out of which 43.0% had children under the age of 18 living with them, 65.2% were married couples living together, 11.1% had a female householder with no husband present, and 18.9% were non-families. 15.0% of all households were made up of individuals, and 6.6% had someone living alone who was 65 years of age or older. The average household size was 3.21 and the average family size was 3.54.

In the CDP, the population was spread out, with 28.4% under the age of 18, 8.2% from 18 to 24, 33.7% from 25 to 44, 21.1% from 45 to 64, and 8.6% who were 65 years of age or older. The median age was 34 years. For every 100 females, there were 97.1 males. For every 100 females age 18 and over, there were 93.1 males.

The median income for a household in the CDP was $58,103, and the median income for a family was $62,708. Males had a median income of $44,665 versus $29,973 for females. The per capita income for the CDP was $20,577. About 3.1% of families and 5.2% of the population were below the poverty threshold, including 4.0% of those under age 18 and 10.1% of those age 65 or over.

== Education ==
=== Schools in Selden ===
- Bicycle Path
- Hawkins Path Elementary
- New Lane Elementary
- Newfield High School
- Selden Middle School
- Stagecoach Elementary
- Suffolk County Community College Ammerman Campus

=== School districts ===
Selden is primarily served by the Middle Country Central School District, while the Brookhaven-Comsewogue Union Free School District and Sachem Central School District also serve small parts of the hamlet.

== Notable people ==
- Eric Booker
- Brian Kelleher
- Terrance Hobbs
