= South Setauket, New York =

Coordinates: 40.913681°N 73.105634°W

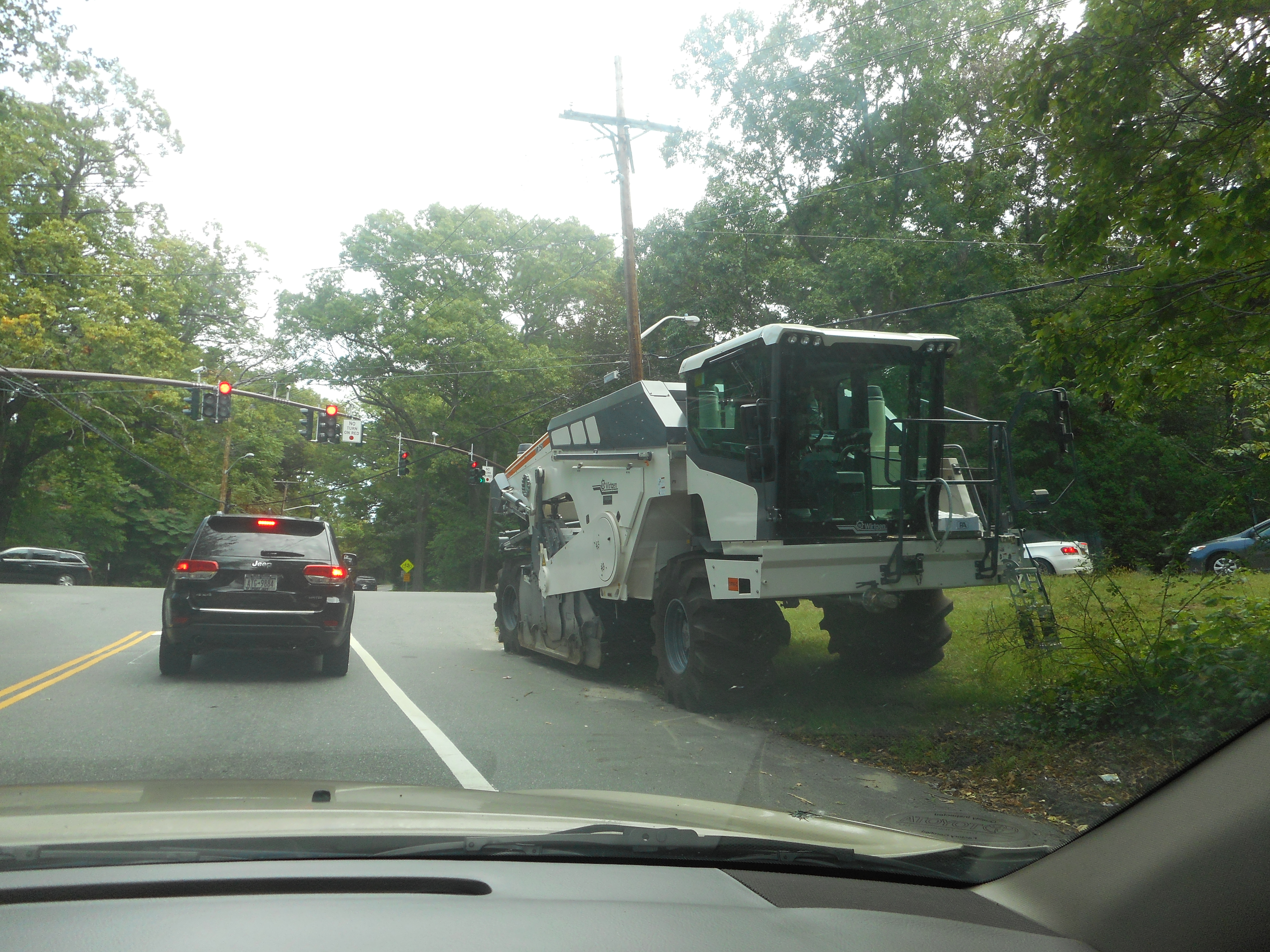
South Setauket in 2015

South Setauket is a locality in Suffolk County, New York, two miles south of Setauket. It is served by the Three Village Central School District. South Setauket shares a ZIP Code with Centereach and is served by the Centereach Postal Office.

In 1869, a "Free Christian" church was erected in the locality.In March 2024, Northville Industries proposed a plan to either create three mega-warehouses or multifamily housing there.

A small, curved hill known locally as "The Wall" stretches from South Setauket to the western end of the Stony Brook University campus.
