= Port Jefferson Station, New York =

Port Jefferson Station, New York Comsewogue Echo, New York
- Hamlet & census-designated place
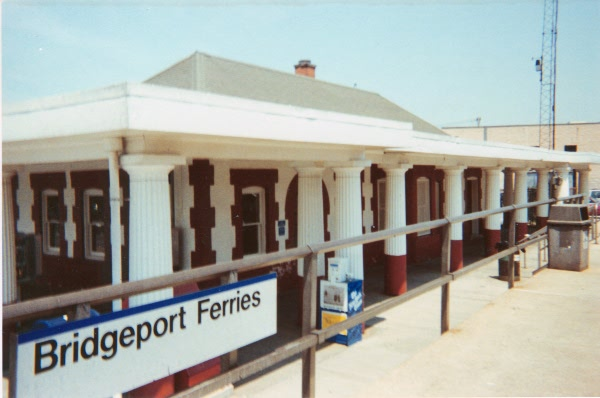
- 1999 photo of the Port Jefferson LIRR station, which changed the name of the community formerly known as "Echo, New York"

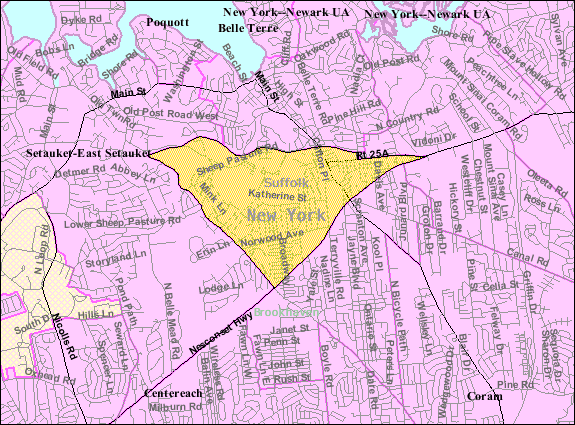
- U.S. Census map

- Location within the state of New York Port Jefferson Station (New York) Port Jefferson Station (the United States)
- Coordinates: 40°55′27″N 73°3′42″W
- Country: United States
- State: New York
- County: Suffolk
- Town: Brookhaven
- Named after: The Long Island Rail Road station located within the hamlet

Area
  - Total: 2.64 sq mi (6.84 km^{2})
  - Land: 2.64 sq mi (6.84 km^{2})
  - Water: 0 sq mi (0.00 km^{2})
- Elevation: 177 ft (54 m)

Population (2020)
  - Total: 7,950
  - Density: 3,010.2/sq mi (1,162.23/km^{2})
- Time zone: UTC−05:00 (Eastern Time Zone)
  - Summer (DST): UTC−04:00
- ZIP Codes: 11776
- Area codes: 631, 934
- FIPS code: 36-59377
- GNIS feature ID: 0960970

Port Jefferson Station (historically known as Comsewogue and Echo) is a hamlet and census-designated place (CDP) in the Town of Brookhaven, in Suffolk County, in New York, United States. The population was 7,950 at the time of the 2020 census.

== History ==
The area now known as Port Jefferson Station was first called by the Native American name Comsewogue. The name "Echo" was also used. The first Colonial resident, William Tooker, had arrived by 1750.

In 1873, the Long Island Rail Road arrived to provide service to nearby Port Jefferson, providing the hamlet with its present-day name.

The primarily farming community began to experience suburban growth following the construction of Nesconset Highway in the mid 1950s. By the early 1970s, it had become a primarily suburban community.

== Geography ==
According to the United States Census Bureau, the CDP has a total area of 2.6 square miles (6.7 km^{2}), all land.

The train tracks mark the northern boundary of Port Jefferson Station, separating it from the Village of Port Jefferson. Nesconset Highway to the south forms a boundary with Terryville.

== Demographics ==
Historical population
Census	Pop.	Note	%±
2020	7,950		—
U.S. Decennial Census

As of the 2010 census, the population of Port Jefferson Station was 7,838. Out of those, 5,598 (76.5%) were White, 183 (2.3%) were Black, 416 (5.3%) were Asian, 7 (0.1%) were Native American, 3 (0.04%) were Native Hawaiian or Pacific Islander, 7 (0.1%) were some other race, and 66 (0.8%) were two or more races. 1,158 people (14.8%) were Hispanic or Latino (of any race).

As of the 2010 census, there were 2,812 households, out of which 34.3% had children under the age of 18 living with them, 52.8% were headed by married couples living together, 11.5% had a female householder with no husband present, and 30.9% were non-families. 23.3% of all households were made up of individuals, and 9.5% were someone living alone who was 65 years of age or older. The average household size was 2.75, and the average family size was 3.21.

In the CDP, the population was spread out, with 21.9% under the age of 18, 9.5% from 18 to 24, 27.6% from 25 to 44, 26.9% from 45 to 64, and 14.1% who were 65 years of age or older. The median age was 39.2 years. For every 100 females, there were 95.7 males. For every 100 females age 18 and over, there were 94.7 males.

For the period 2007–11, the median annual income for a household in the CDP was $61,218, and the median income for a family was $73,854. Males had a median income of $67,466 versus $32,571 for females. The per capita income for the CDP was $32,894. About 0.8% of families and 12.7% of the population were below the poverty line, including 10.0% of those under age 18 and 2.3% of those age 65 or over.

== Education ==
Port Jefferson Station is primarily located within the boundaries of (and is thus served by) the Brookhaven-Comsewogue Union Free School District, although smaller portions are within the boundaries of the Mount Sinai Union Free School District, Middle country central school district and the Three Village Central School District. As such, children who reside within Port Jefferson Station and attend public school will attend school in one of these three districts, depending on where they live within the hamlet.

== Transportation ==
The Long Island Rail Road station is on the hamlet's northern border with the Incorporated Village of Port Jefferson. The area is also served by the following Suffolk County Transit bus routes:

- 51: Patchogue LIRR station - Port Jefferson via Smith Haven Mall & Stony Brook University
- 62: Smith Haven Mall - Riverhead LIRR station

== See also ==
- Lawrence Aviation Industries, Inc.
