= Terryville, New York =

- Census-designated place
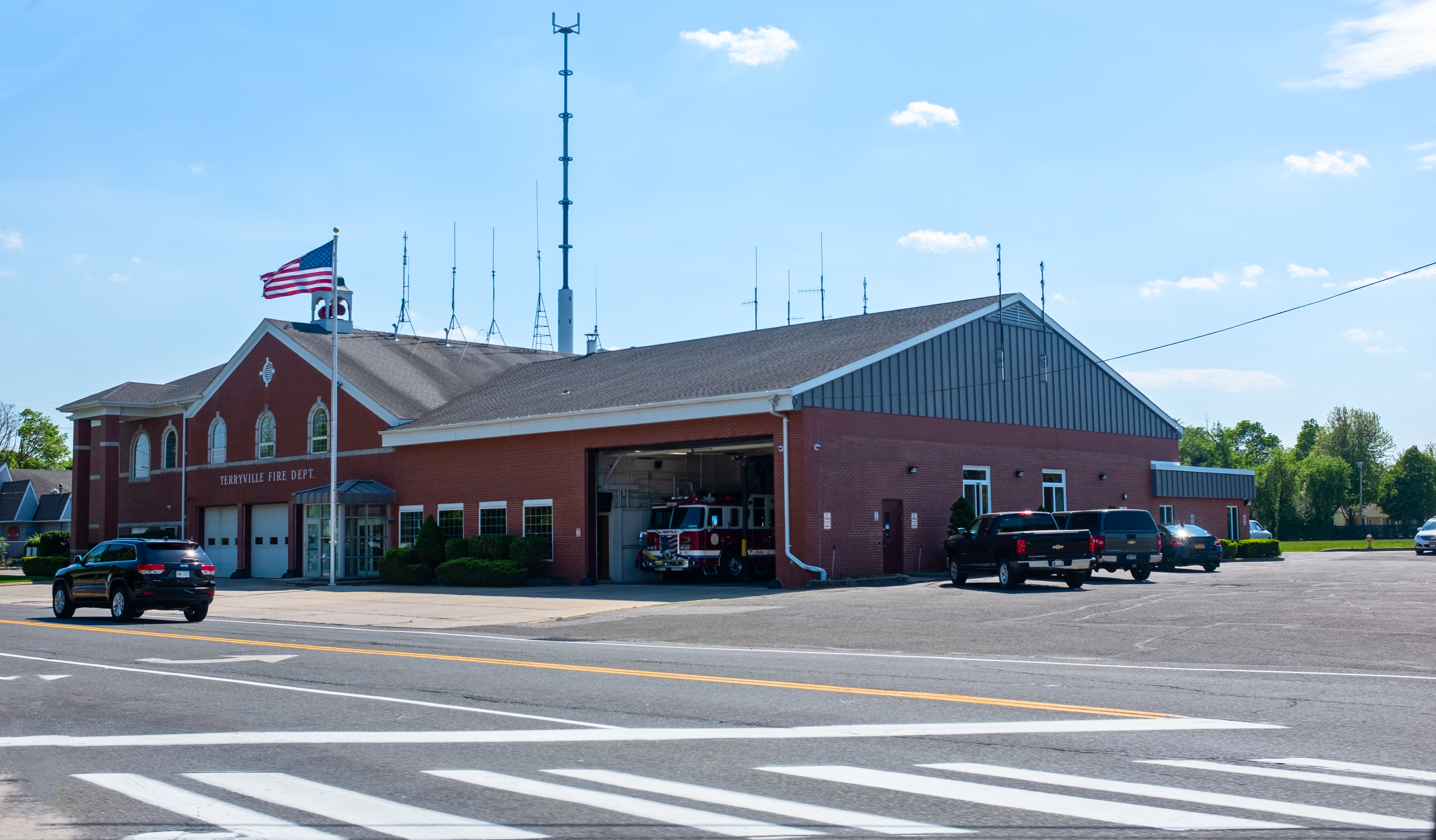
- The Terryville Fire Department in 2021.

- Location of Terryville in New York.
- Coordinates: 40°54′19″N 73°3′55″W
- Country: United States
- State: New York
- Region: Suffolk
- Town: Brookhaven

Area
  - Total: 3.15 sq mi (8.17 km^{2})
  - Land: 3.15 sq mi (8.17 km^{2})
  - Water: 0 sq mi (0.00 km^{2})

Population (2020)
  - Total: 11,472
  - Density: 3,636.4/sq mi (1,404.02/km^{2})
- Time zone: UTC-5 (EST)
  - Summer (DST): UTC-4 (EDT)
- Postal code: 11776
- Area codes: 631; 934
- FIPS code: 36-73352

Terryville is a census-designated place (CDP) in the Town of Brookhaven, Suffolk County, New York, United States. As of the 2020 census, Terryville had a population of 11,472.

== Geography ==
According to the United States Census Bureau, the CDP has a total area of 3.2 square miles (8.3 km^{2}), all land.

== Demographics ==
Historical population
Census	Pop.	Note	%±
2020	11,472		—
U.S. Decennial Census

=== 2020 census ===
As of the 2020 census, Terryville had a population of 11,472. The median age was 42.0 years. 20.5% of residents were under the age of 18 and 18.0% of residents were 65 years of age or older. For every 100 females there were 90.7 males, and for every 100 females age 18 and over there were 89.6 males age 18 and over.

100.0% of residents lived in urban areas, while 0.0% lived in rural areas.

There were 3,853 households in Terryville, of which 33.6% had children under the age of 18 living in them. Of all households, 55.4% were married-couple households, 12.2% were households with a male householder and no spouse or partner present, and 27.2% were households with a female householder and no spouse or partner present. About 21.8% of all households were made up of individuals and 13.6% had someone living alone who was 65 years of age or older.

There were 4,006 housing units, of which 3.8% were vacant. The homeowner vacancy rate was 1.2% and the rental vacancy rate was 2.4%.

Racial composition as of the 2020 census
Race	Number	Percent
White	8,390	73.1%
Black or African American	418	3.6%
American Indian and Alaska Native	26	0.2%
Asian	434	3.8%
Native Hawaiian and Other Pacific Islander	2	0.0%
Some other race	1,169	10.2%
Two or more races	1,033	9.0%
Hispanic or Latino (of any race)	2,411	21.0%

=== 2000 census ===
As of the census of 2000, there were 10,589 people, 3,313 households, and 2,739 families residing in the CDP. The population density was 3,295.6 inhabitants per square mile (1,272.4/km^{2}). There were 3,437 housing units at an average density of 1,069.7 per square mile (413.0/km^{2}). The racial makeup of the CDP was 91.81% White, 1.62% African American, 0.10% Native American, 2.29% Asian, 0.01% Pacific Islander, 2.67% from other races, and 1.49% from two or more races. Hispanic or Latino of any race were 7.51% of the population.

There were 3,313 households, of which 41.4% had children under the age of 18 living with them, 71.1% were married couples living together, 8.3% had a female householder with no husband present, and 17.3% were non-families. 13.6% of all households were made up of individuals, and 4.9% had someone living alone who was 65 years of age or older. The average household size was 3.18 and the average family size was 3.49.

In the CDP, the population was spread out, with 27.4% under the age of 18, 7.3% from 18 to 24, 33.5% from 25 to 44, 23.3% from 45 to 64, and 8.4% who were 65 years of age or older. The median age was 35 years. For every 100 females, there were 97.7 males. For every 100 females age 18 and over, there were 96.5 males.

The median income for a household in the CDP was $68,034, and the median income for a family was $71,160. Males had a median income of $47,500 versus $32,332 for females. The per capita income for the CDP was $24,422. About 2.1% of families and 3.2% of the population were below the poverty line, including 4.2% of those under age 18 and 1.6% of those age 65 or over.

== Education ==
Terryville is served primarily by the Brookhaven–Comsewogue Union Free School District. However, small parts of the southern and western sections are served by the Middle Country Central School District and the Three Village Central School District, respectively.
