= Center Moriches Union Free School District =

Public school district in New York, United States

Location
- Center Moriches, Suffolk County, New York; United States

District information
- Motto: Excellence-Empowerment-Equity
- Grades: K-12
- President: Brian Tenety
- Superintendent: Dr. Ricardo Sato
- Schools: 3

Students and staff
- Students: 1,453
- District mascot: Red Devils
- Colors: Red and white

Other information
- District Offices: 529 Main Street Center Moriches, NY 11934
- Website: www.cmschools.org

Center Moriches Union Free School District is a school district in the Town of Brookhaven in Suffolk County, New York. The district serves the vast majority of Center Moriches and parts of Moriches, Manorville, and Fire Island on the South Shore of Long Island.

== History ==
=== Early district history ===
Before 1897 a school known as the Center Moriches School was a school with only two teachers and without concrete grades. In 1898, another building was added. This caused growth in the district over the following years, and after 1909, the school warranted set in stone grades, with it becoming the Center Moriches High School of the time, located on Main Street. The "Little Red Schoolhouse" in Moriches opened in 1925, and served Center Moriches students for years. It has since been owned by the William Floyd School District, and is being converted into the community library of the Mastic/Mastic Beach-Moriches-Shirley area as of October 2025.

=== Clayton Huey ===
Clayton Huey was a key player in the history of the district, and was both a district staff member and member of the Center Moriches community for decades. During his 32 years in the district from 1955 until his retirement in 1986, he served as a physical education teacher, soccer coach, principal of Center Moriches Elementary School, and even superintendent of the district. He died in 2024 at the age of 93. Today, the district's elementary school bears his name.

=== Recent history ===
In the early 1990s, the district was involved with a major lawsuit. The district did not allow Lamb's Chapel to show a film series about issues in parenting in the school after hours, citing it was "church related." Lamb's Chapel initially filed suit in 1990, with a federal district court and the Second Circuit Court of Appeals both siding with the district. After this, it ended up in the Supreme Court of the United States, who ruled unanimously 9-0 in the favor of Lamb's Chapel and that the district was violating the freedom of speech given in the First Amendment. The court ruled that the district allowing other groups but groups but not Lamb's Chapel because of their religiosity was a blatant violation of free speech and the First Amendment. Their decision overturned the previous decision of the Second Circuit Court of Appeals. The court heard the case on February 24, 1993 and made their decision on June 7, 1993.

In 2025, the district was criticized by New York State Comptroller Thomas DiNapoli for questionable tracking of taxpayer funds and payroll, especially concerning chaperoning athletic competitions. The district has since agreed to pay much closer attention to their payroll and make the approval of time sheets more supported and official.

== Schools ==
The following is a table of the schools in the Center Moriches Union Free School District.

| School name | Type of school | Address | Grades | Principal |
|---|---|---|---|---|
| Center Moriches High School | High School | 311 Frowein Road Center Moriches, NY 11934 | 9-12 | Marissa Mangogna |
| Center Moriches Middle School | Middle School | 311 Frowein Road Center Moriches, NY 11934 | 6-8 | Dr. Melissa Reggio |
| Clayton Huey Elementary School | Elementary School | 511 Main Street Center Moriches, NY 11934 | K-5 | Dr. Nicole Fernandez |
