= Brookhaven Public Schools =

School Agency in Brookhaven, New York

Brookhaven Public School System

Location
- Long Island Suffolk County, New York

District information
- Type: Public
- Grades: K-12
- Schools: 102

Students and staff
- Students: 63,577 (2020-21)

Other information
- Website: https://www.brookhavenny.gov

Brookhaven Public Schools is a School District Agency in the U.S State of New York mostly in Brookhaven. As of the 2020-2021 school year, It had over 63,500 students. BPS maintains 14 High Schools, which is by far more than any in New York after NYCPS and Buffalo Public Schools.

== School districts ==
- Comsewogue (1)
- Center Moriches (2)
- Eastport (3)
- Longwood (4)
- Middle Country (5)
- Miller Place (6)
- Mt. Sinai (7)
- Patchogue-Medford (8)
- Port Jefferson (9)
- Rocky Point (10)
- Sachem (11)
- Shoreham-Wading River (12)
- South Country (13)
- Three Village (14)
- William Floyd (15)

== High Schools ==
- Comsewogue High School (1)
- Center Moriches High School (2)
- Eastport - South Manor High School (3)
- Longwood High School (4)
- Centereach High School (5)
- Newfield High School (5)
- Miller Place High School (6)
- Mt. Sinai High School (7)
- Patchogue-Medford High School (8)
- Port Jefferson High School (9)
- Rocky Point High School (10)
- Sachem High School East (11)
- Sachem High School North (11)
- Shoreham-Wading River High School (12)
- Bellport High School (13)
- Ward Melville High School (14)
- William Floyd High School (15)

https://www.niche.com/k12/search/best-school-districts/t/brookhaven-suffolk-ny/

https://data.nysed.gov/profile.php?county=58
