= Brookhaven, New York =

2nd most populated town in New York, United States

- Town
- Town of Brookhaven
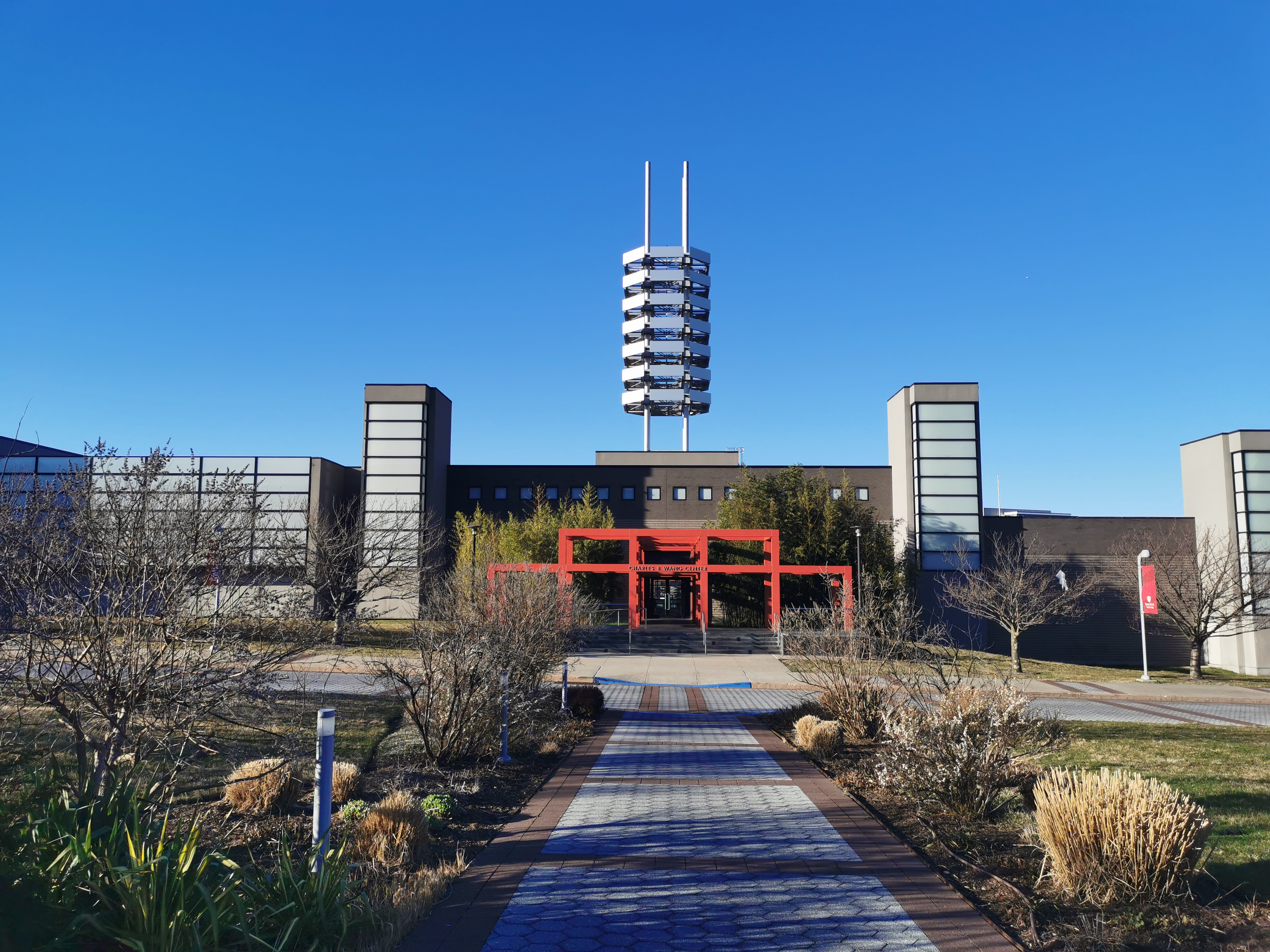
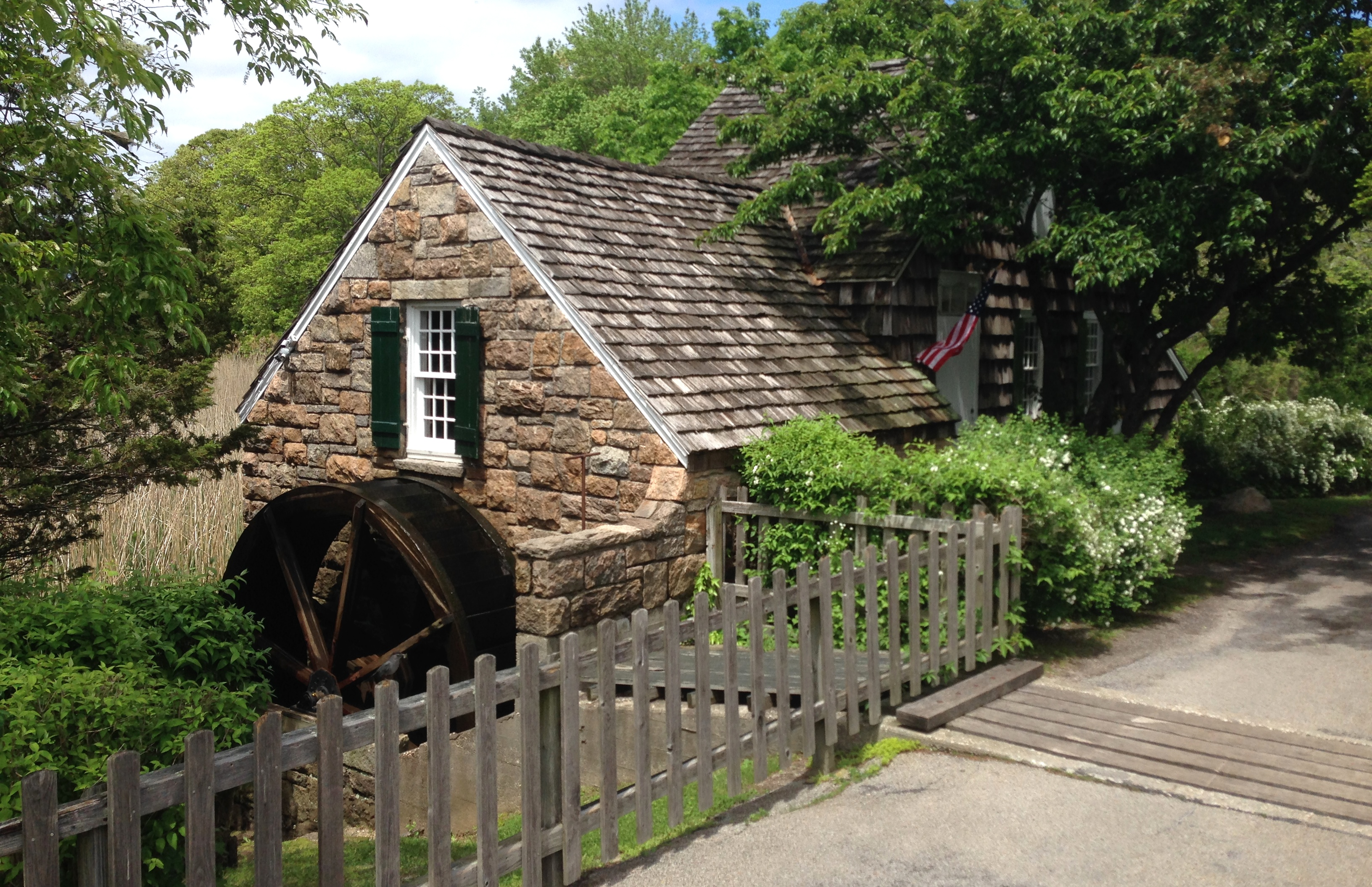
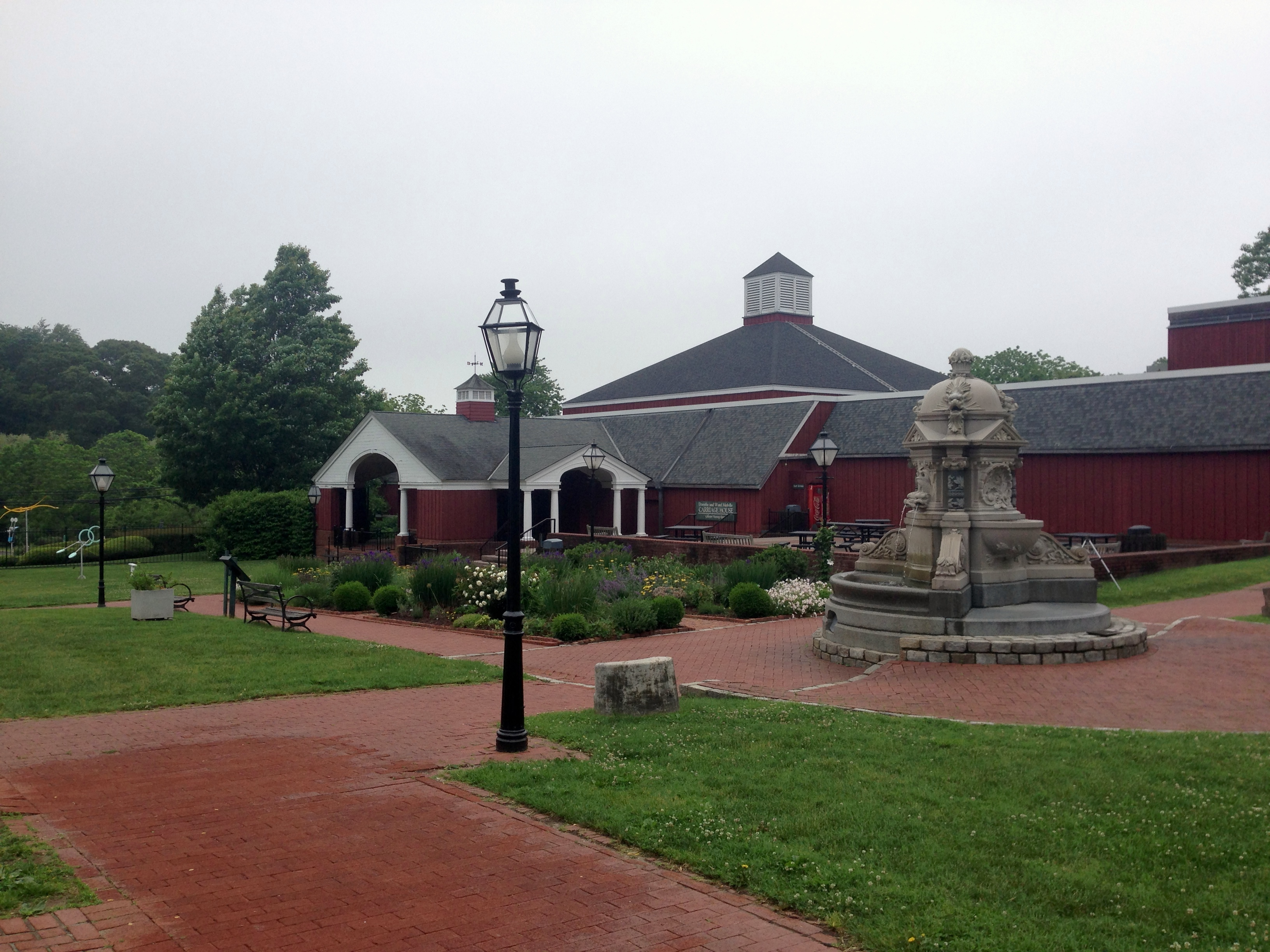
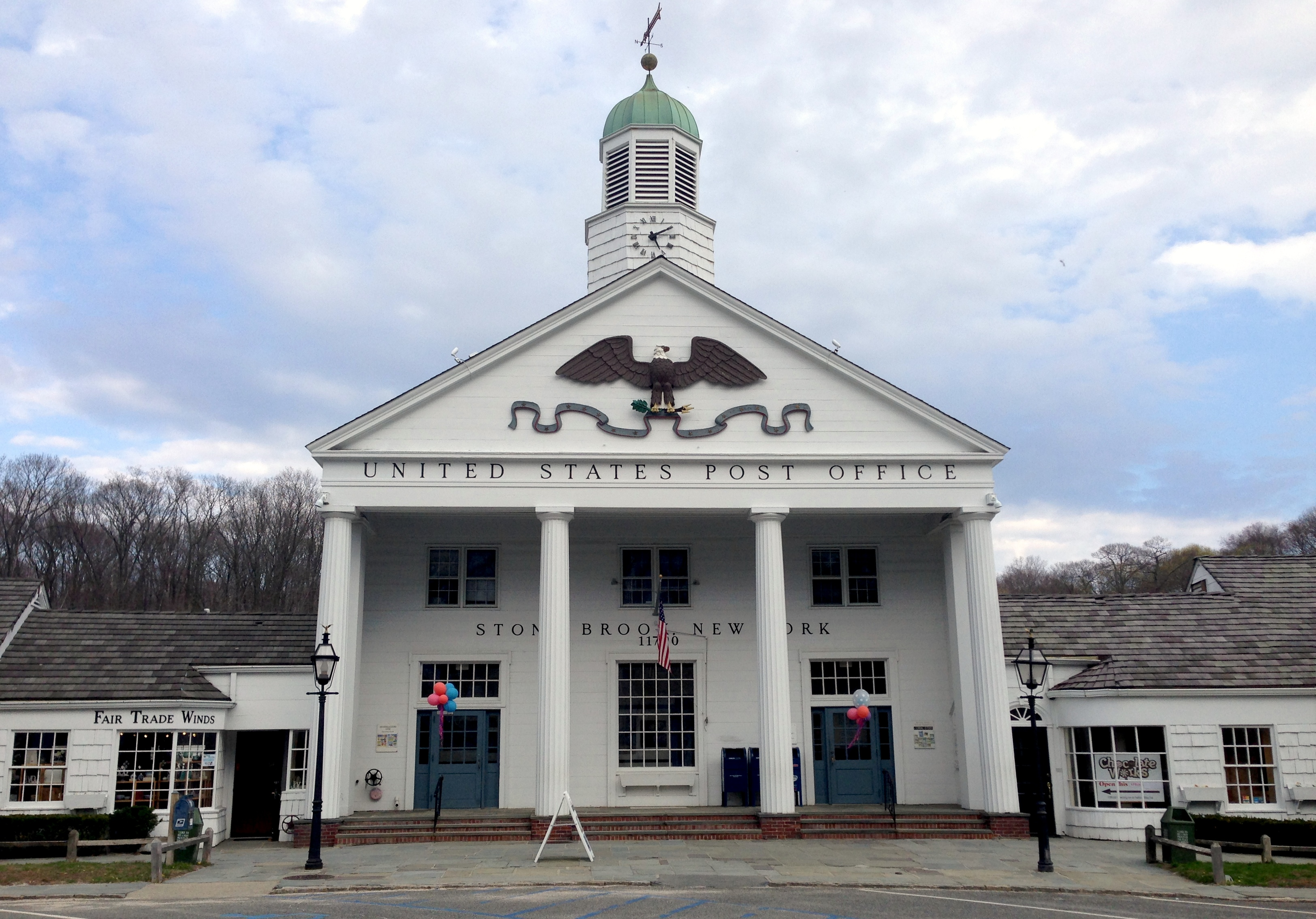
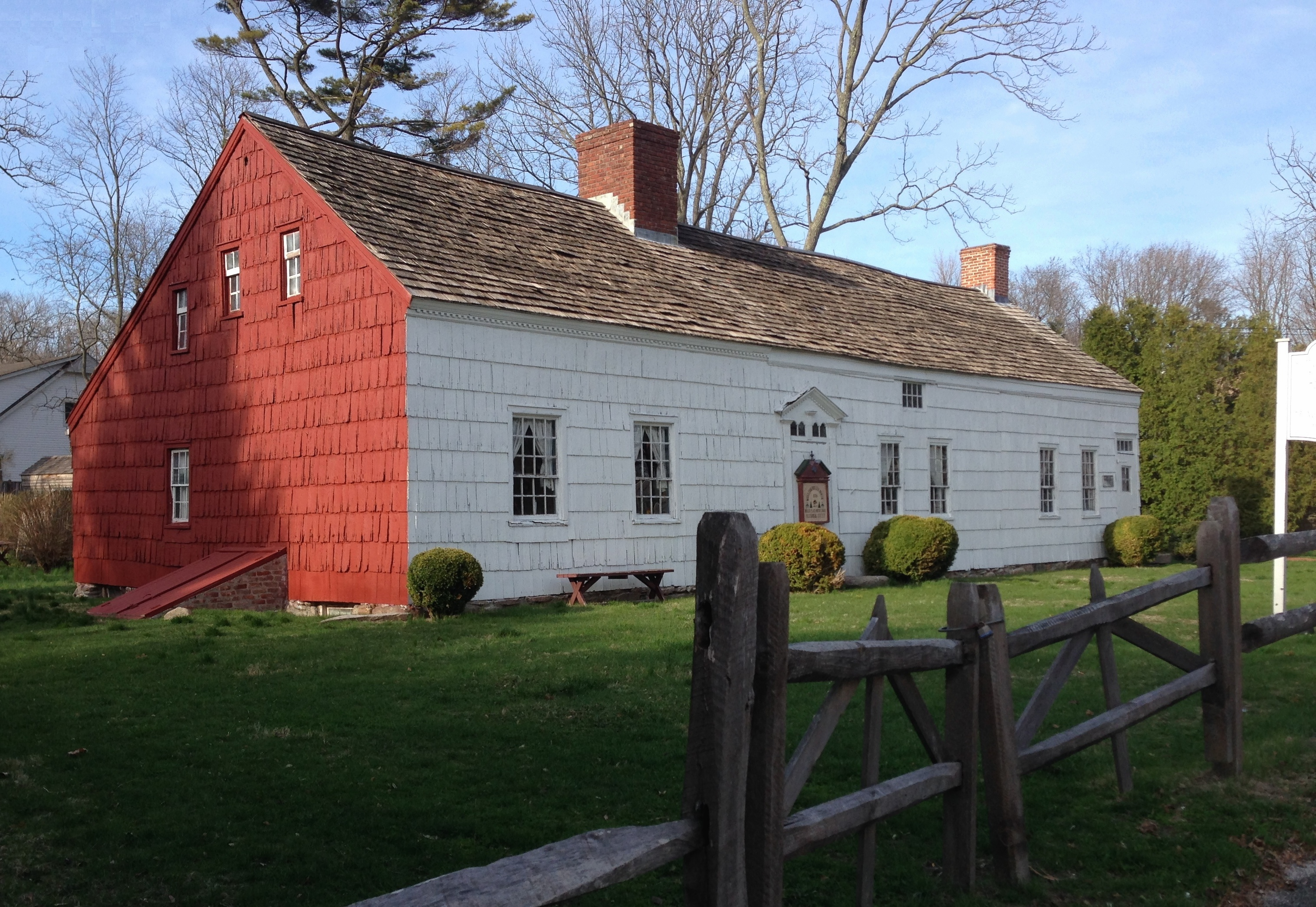
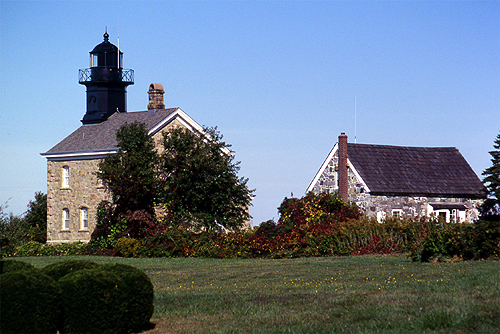
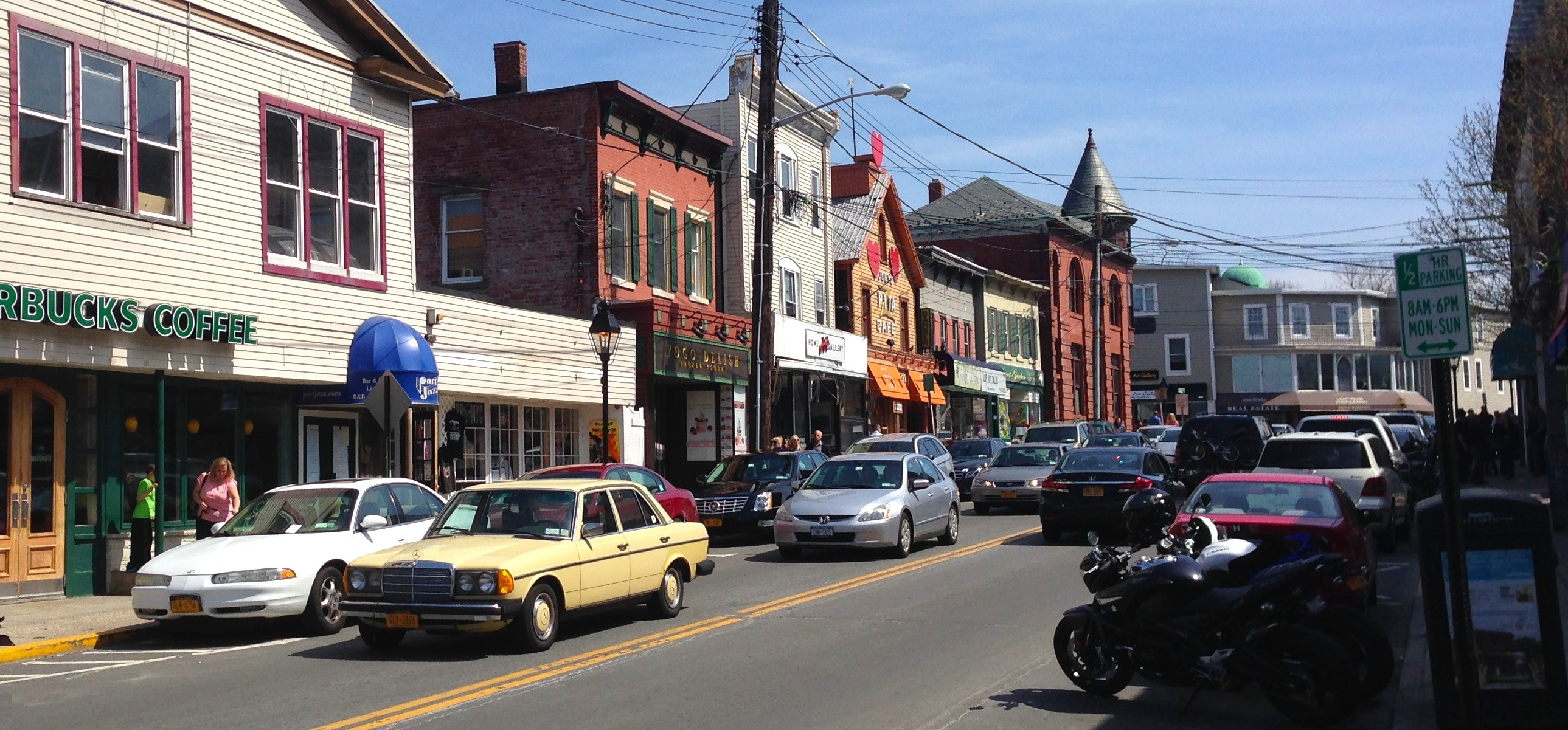
- Stony Brook University Setauket Mill in Setauket Long Island Museum Stony Brook Village Center William Miller House in Miller Place Old Field Point Light Downtown Port Jefferson

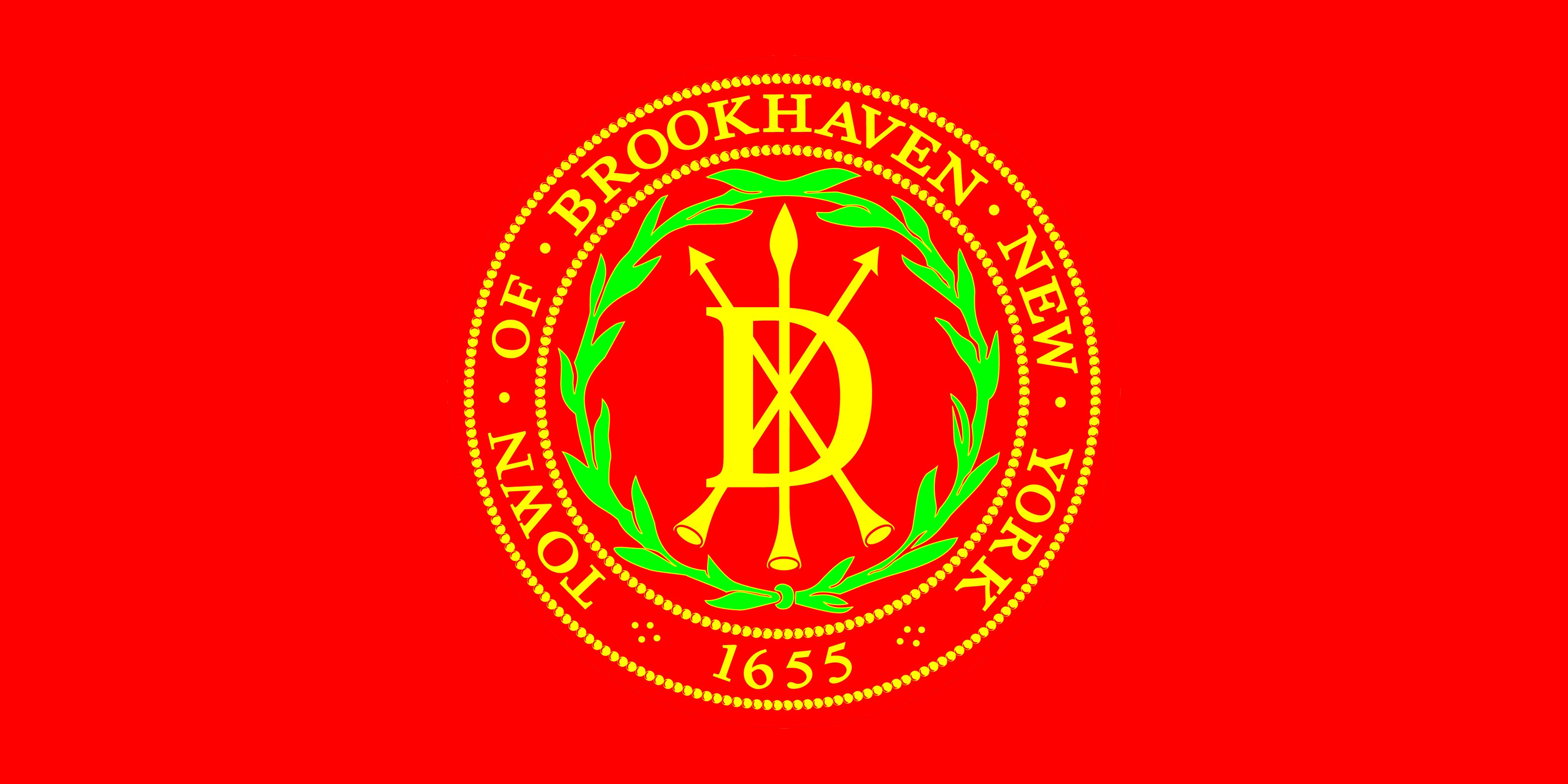
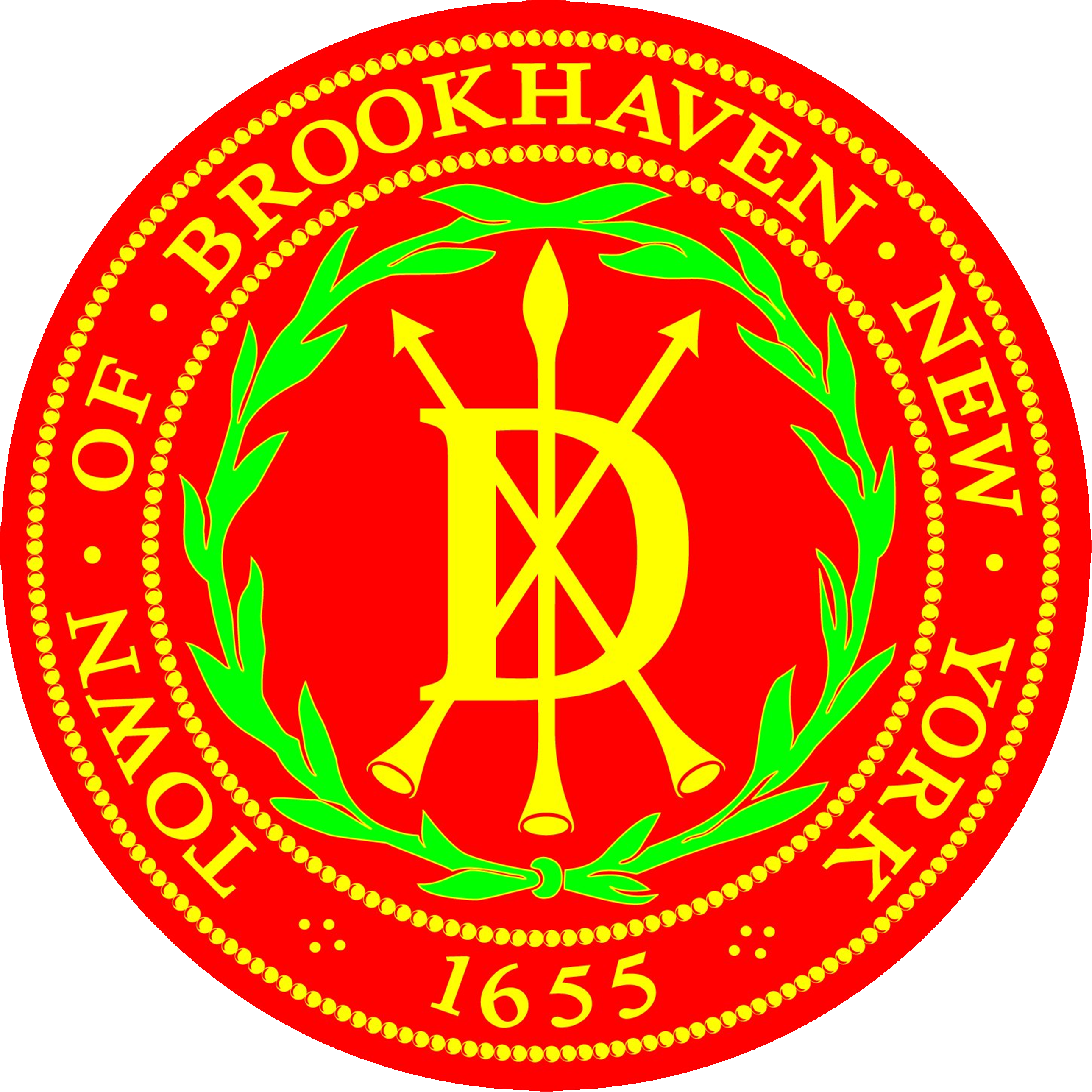
- Flag Seal
- Interactive map of Brookhaven, New York
- Coordinates: 40°49′N 72°56′W
- Country: United States
- State: New York
- County: Suffolk
- First settled: 1655
- Incorporated: 1686
- Town Seat: Farmingville

Government
  - Type: Civil township
  - Body: Brookhaven Town Council
  - Supervisor: Daniel J. Panico (R)

Area
  - Total: 531.54 sq mi (1,376.68 km^{2})
  - Land: 259.43 sq mi (671.93 km^{2})
  - Water: 272.11 sq mi (704.75 km^{2})
  - Rank: 1st (when water area included)
- Elevation: 79 ft (24 m)

Population (2020)
  - Total: 485,773
  - Rank: 3rd
  - Density: 1,875.6/sq mi (724.18/km^{2})
- Time zone: UTC−05:00 (Eastern Time Zone)
  - Summer (DST): UTC−04:00
- Area codes: 631, 934
- FIPS code: 36-10000
- GNIS feature ID: 0978758
- Website: www.brookhavenny.gov

Brookhaven is a large suburban town in Suffolk County, New York, United States, on Long Island. With a population of 488,497 as of 2022, it is the second most populous town in New York (after Hempstead, in the adjacent Nassau County) and the third most populous community in the state.

The first settlement in what is now Brookhaven was known as Setauket. Founded as a group of agricultural hamlets in the mid-17th century, Brookhaven first expanded as a major center of shipbuilding in the 19th century. Its proximity to New York City facilitated the establishment of resort communities, followed by a post-war population boom. In the 2020 census record, Brookhaven contained 485,773 people.

The township is home to two renowned research centers, Stony Brook University and Brookhaven National Laboratory. Combined these two research centers are approximately 50% of the Town's top ten employer's employee count. Tourism is also a major part of the local economy. The largest traditional downtowns are located in Port Jefferson, a regional transportation hub for the Bridgeport & Port Jefferson Ferry, and Patchogue. The area has long been serviced by the Long Island Rail Road.

== History ==
=== Origins and etymology ===
The primary known inhabitants were Algonquian-speaking Native Americans, of the Setauket and Unkechaug tribes. The first English settlers arrived around 1640, and in 1655, several purchased Brookhaven's land from its tribal inhabitants. The latter founding year was recognized in 1976, when the Brookhaven Town Bicentennial Commission proposed setting the date on the seal to 1655 in line with this first deed of settlement of the town of Brookhaven at Setauket on April 14, 1655. Considering this founding year of 1655, Brookhaven is the fifth English township on Long Island following Southampton, Southold, Huntington, and East Hampton.

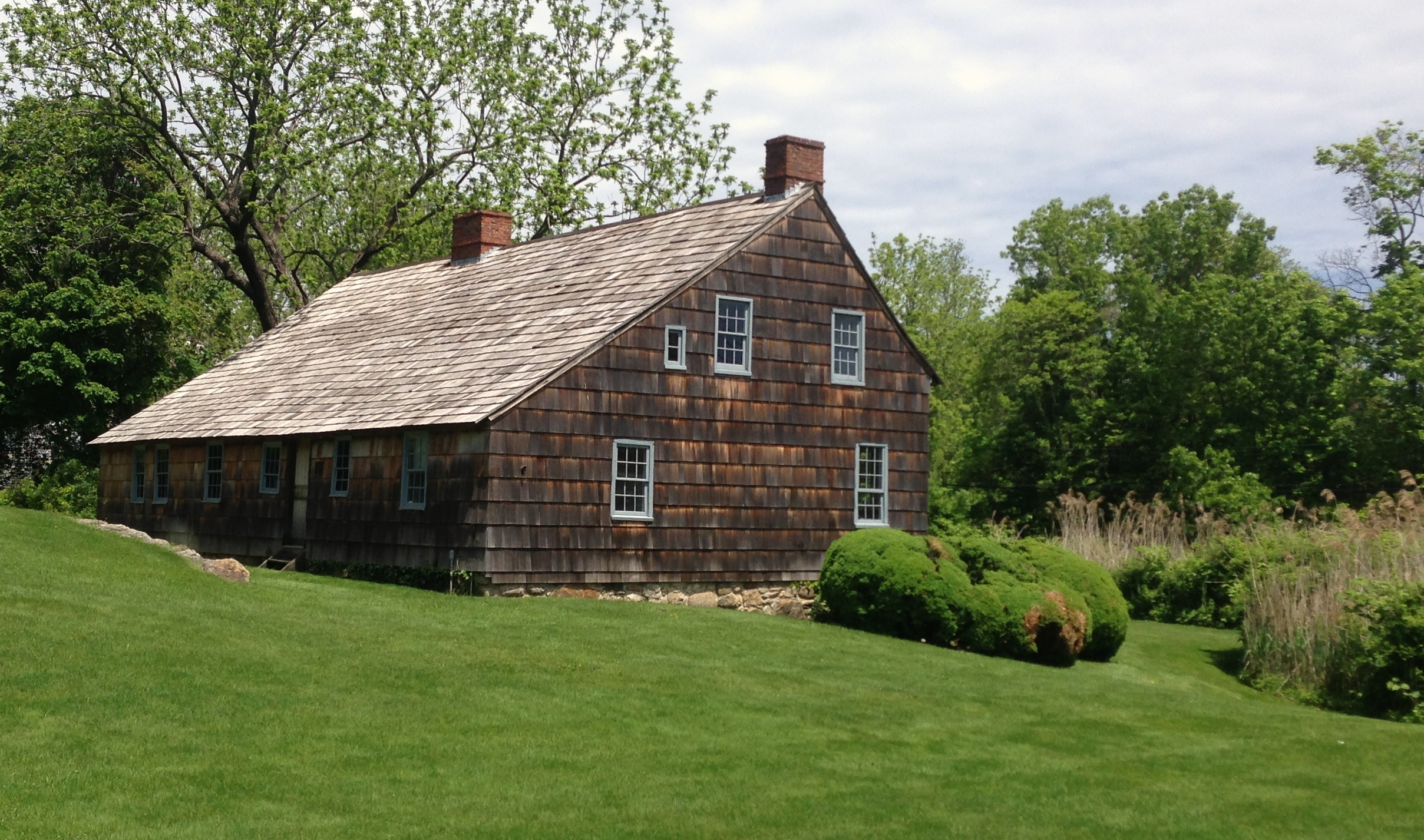
The c. 1665 Brewster House is the oldest extant structure in the town of Brookhaven and is within the town's first settlement, Setauket.

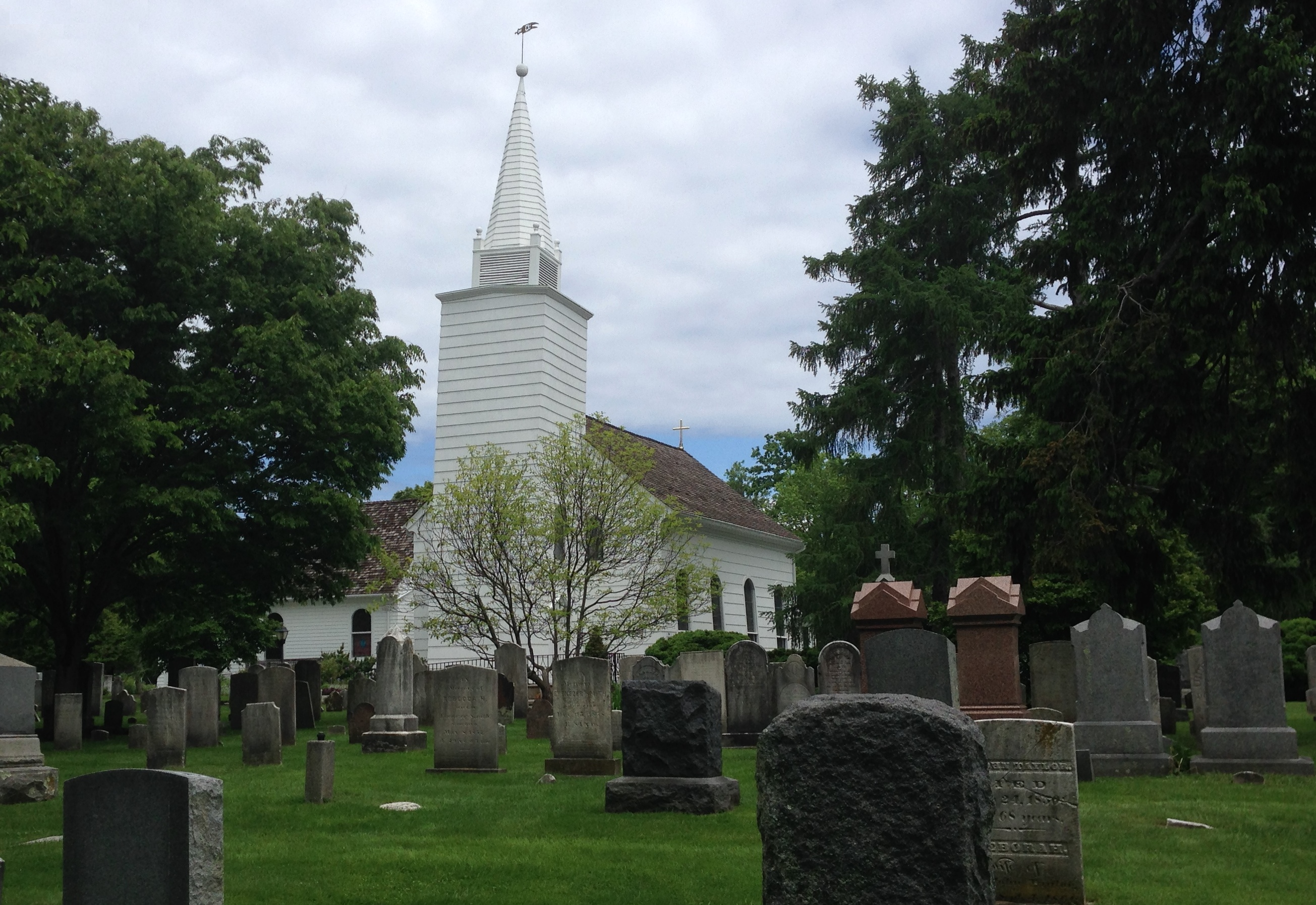
The Caroline Church in Setauket, was built in 1729 and is the oldest extant church in Brookhaven

The first English settlement was named "Setauket" after the Native American tribe. The names "Brookhaven" and "Setauket" were initially used interchangeably to describe the village or the town. The verbal division between the smaller hamlet of Setauket and township of Brookhaven was not set until well into the 19th century. A point of confusion is the existence of the hamlet named Brookhaven, which was in fact named for the township in 1879. Other names used in the settlement's first decades were "Ashford", after Ashford, Kent, in England, and "Cromwell Bay", for English Protestant leader Oliver Cromwell.

The original purchase from the native Setalcott tribe that took place in 1655 encompassed the land making up present-day Setauket, Stony Brook, and Port Jefferson. A second purchase was made by Richard Woodhull in 1664 expanded this tract eastward along the North Shore to additionally include all lands from the Old Mans area (Mount Sinai and Miller Place) to Wading River. Richard Woodhull was the direct heir of Eustace de Vesci, a British noble who was a signator of the Magna Charta. Another land purchase in the same year expanded Brookhaven to the South Shore of Long Island.

Brookhaven was integrated into the Province of New York following that colony's establishment in 1664, and in 1666 Governor Richard Nicolls granted a patent for the town which confirmed title to the lands purchased. Governor Thomas Dongan issued a patent in 1686 which granted powers to the town and established a representative form of government. The town seal was authorized at this time. The central element of the town seal, the letter “D”, was designated to the Town of Brookhaven as its official cattle earmark by the Duke's Laws of 1665. Although no records exist dating to the town seal's original design plan, it is generally thought that the seal's olive branch signified peace and the whaling tools signified the most lucrative business in the Town of Brookhaven at the time. The current seal is a redesign, retaining the original elements, but adding the Town of Brookhaven and its 1655 date of settlement.

=== Colonial era ===
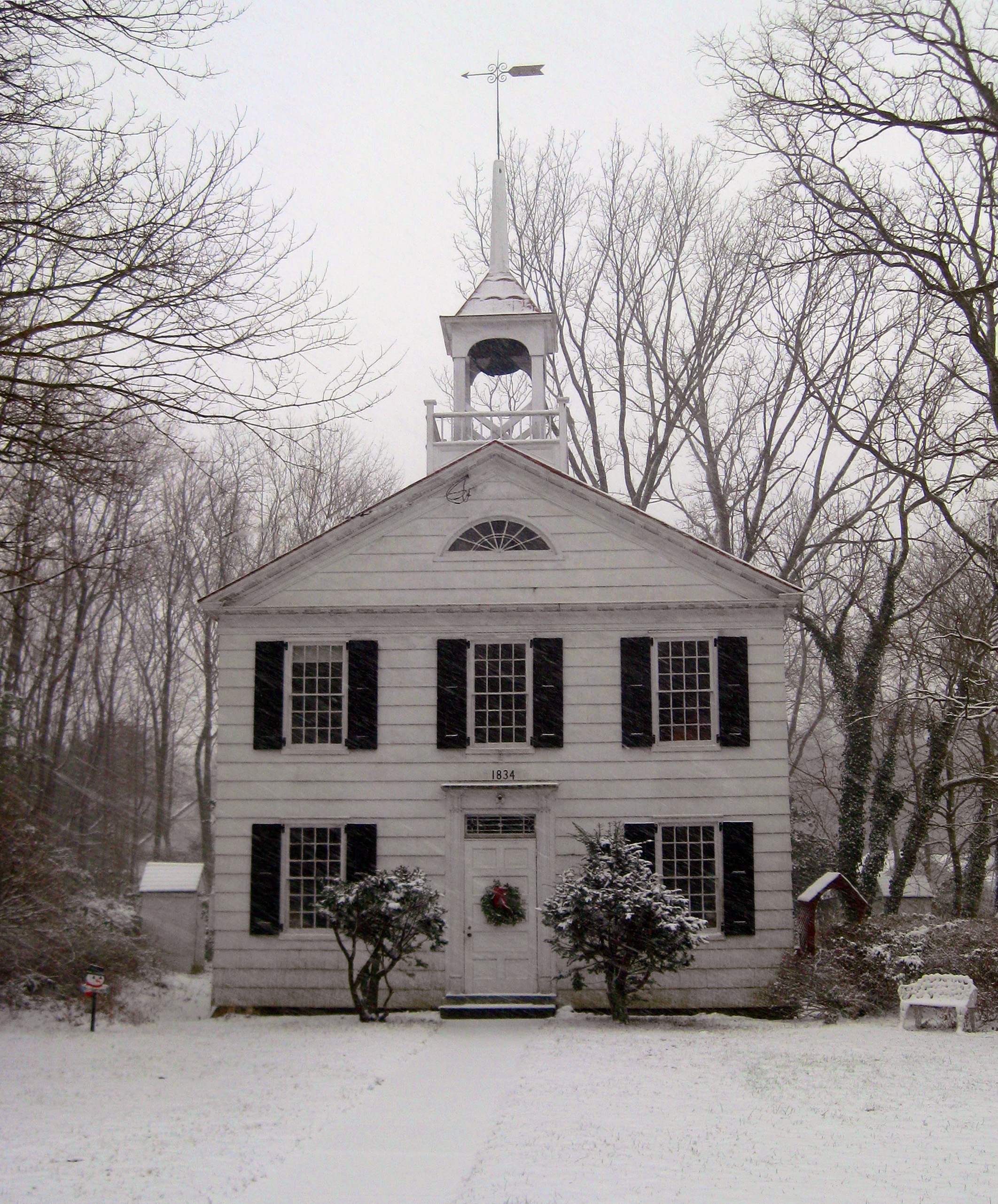
The Miller Place Academy schoolhouse, c.1834

Early English settlers farmed, fished, and hunted whales. Brookhaven was largely agrarian, with each hamlet being limited to a handful of families yet containing miles of land. This economy was supplemented in coastal sections with fishing. A major commercial center did not exist in Brookhaven until the early 19th century.

Brookhaven was founded primarily by English colonists that partook in the settlement of Southold, and was likewise under the jurisdiction of the theocratic New Haven Colony in the modern state of Connecticut. Brookhaven was transferred to the more secular Hartford-led Connecticut Colony in 1662. Following the English takeover of New Netherland in 1664, the new English colony of New York laid claim to Long Island and brought Brookhaven into its jurisdiction.

=== American Revolutionary War ===
During the early stages of the American Revolutionary War, Brookhaven and the rest of Long Island were captured by British forces, and many residents sided with the British as loyalists to the English crown. Nevertheless, Brookhaven had multiple episodes of celebrated American activity during the war. This included the actions of the Culper Spy Ring, a spy network working for George Washington that largely consisted of Brookhaveners working in occupied territory. Another episode was Benjamin Tallmadge's successful raid from across Long Island to the British stronghold at the Manor St. George, wherein his raiding party rowed from Connecticut to Cedar Beach and marched across Long Island, culminating in the Battle of Fort St. George and burning of the defensive structure. A more minor skirmish occurred within the settlement of Setauket, where the British had repurposed the local Protestant church as a fortress. Gunshots were fired and some bullet holes remain within the walls of the adjacent Caroline Church.

=== Development ===
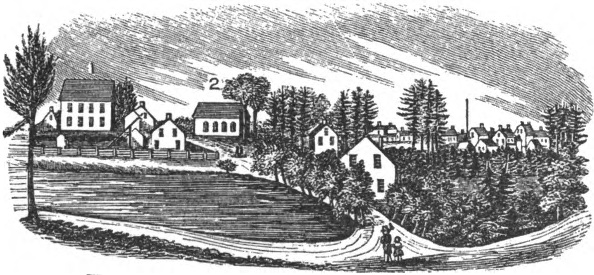
Sketch of early Patchogue

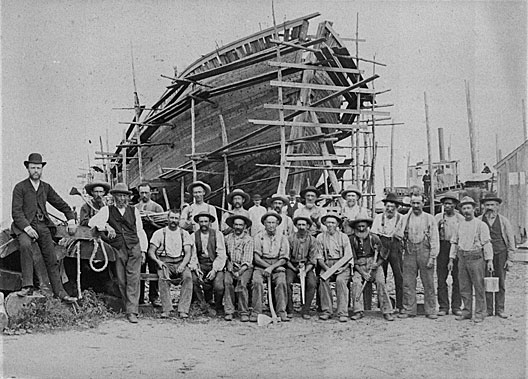
Mather Shipyard in Port Jefferson, 1884

In the mid-19th century, several communities in Brookhaven prospered as shipbuilding ports. The most successful of those were the villages of Port Jefferson and Patchogue, which remain the township's most bustling traditional downtowns. Whaling and cordwood industries also developed in Brookhaven.

Railroads reached Brookhaven in the mid-19th century, beginning in 1843 with trains reaching inland to Ronkonkoma. The earliest equivalent to the North Shore's present-day Port Jefferson Branch began operation in 1873. The Bridgeport & Port Jefferson Ferry has been operating between Port Jefferson and Bridgeport, Connecticut, since 1888 and was partly founded by legendary circus-master P. T. Barnum.

From the end of the late 19th century until the middle of the 20th, many communities along the North Shore and South Shore became successful resort towns. These hosted many urban residents from nearby New York City, including numerous celebrities of the era, during the summer months. Meanwhile, many rural sections across Brookhaven served as campgrounds for youth clubs.

During the Gilded Age, Brookhaven underwent some of the same changes that affected Long Island's Gold Coast. Waterfront areas along the North Shore, including Belle Terre and Old Field, transformed from small fishing communities into fashionable and exclusive enclaves of the moneyed elite.

A variety of notable research occurred in Brookhaven around the turn of the 20th century. Inventor Nikola Tesla had a research center in Shoreham, which featured the large Wardenclyffe Tower. As of 2016, this site was being renovated as the Tesla Science Center at Wardenclyffe. Guglielmo Marconi opened one of the world's largest radio facilities, known as RCA's Radio Central, in Rocky Point.

=== Modern history ===
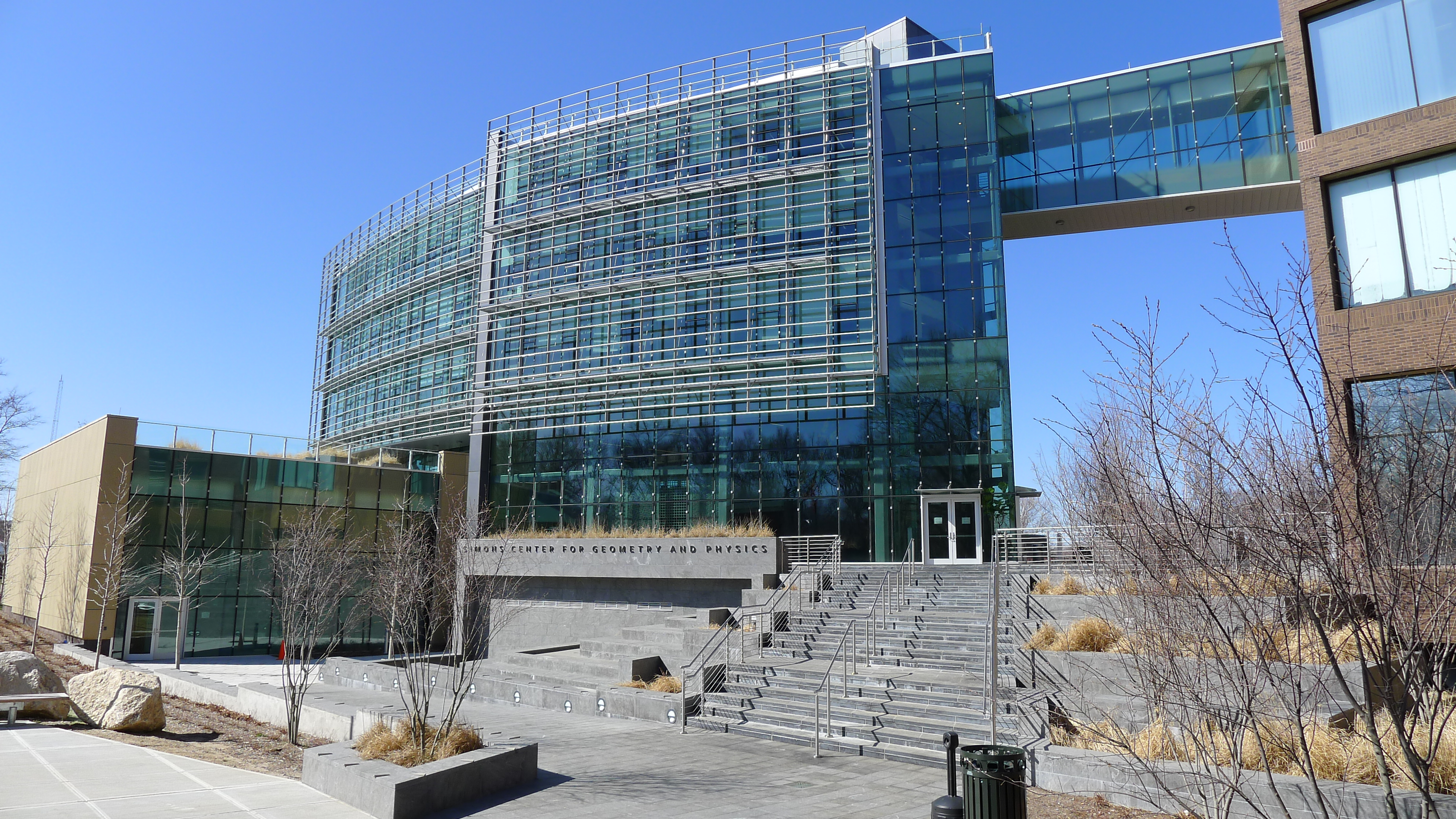
Simons Center for Geometry and Physics at Stony Brook University

In the post-war era, Brookhaven experienced a massive population boom. This was partly due to its proximity to New York City along the Long Island Rail Road and the highway system of Robert Moses. The township's most internationally renowned institutions, Stony Brook University and Brookhaven National Lab, both date to the years following World War II.

During the mid-century, a number of major transformations were conducted by philanthropist Ward Melville in the "Three Village" area (The Setaukets, Stony Brook, and Old Field). Melville, an Old Field resident and owner of what later became CVS Corporation, used his fortune to transform Northwestern Brookhaven to his vision of an idealized New England–style region. To this end, he ordered the construction in 1939 of the Stony Brook Village Center, a picturesque commercial center set on village green in Stony Brook, with clapboard buildings designed to look as if they had colonial origins. In 1962, Ward Melville donated 400 acres of land for the relocation of now-named Stony Brook University from Oyster Bay.

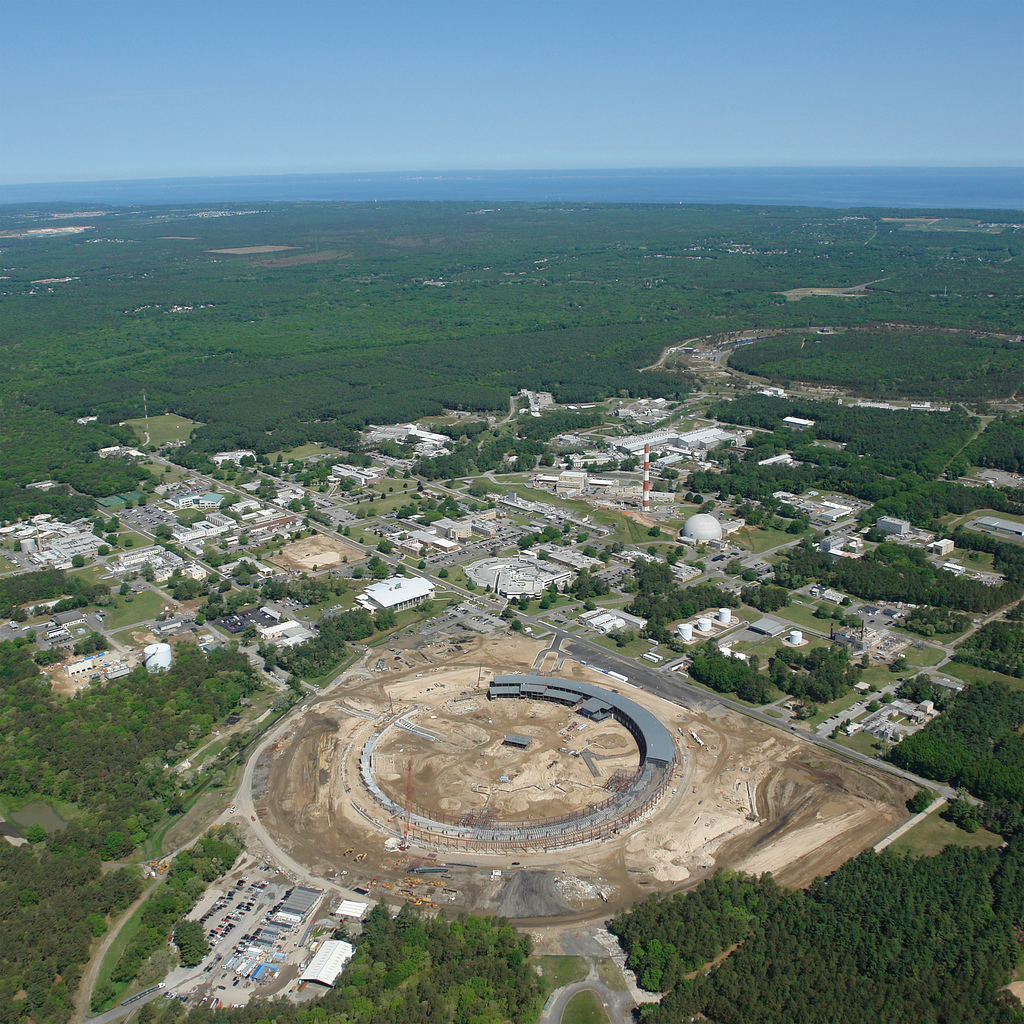
Brookhaven National Laboratory

Brookhaven National Laboratory (BNL) sits on the site of Camp Upton, a United States Army installation that was used as a training ground in World War I and World War II by thousands of soldiers including composer Irving Berlin. In 1946 ownership of the grounds was transferred for use by the new national laboratory, which began operating the following year. Brookhaven researchers have since made such diverse contributions as patenting Maglev, designing one of the first video games, detecting the first solar neutrinos, designing pollutant-eating bacteria, creating the first PET scan, and various contributions to particle physics. The laboratory contains the Relativistic Heavy Ion Collider (RHIC) and the National Synchrotron Light Source.

== Geography ==
Brookhaven is located centrally on the geographic Long Island and extends from the North Shore to the South Shore. According to the United States Census Bureau, the town has a total area of 532.0 square miles (1,378 km^{2}), of which 259.6 square miles (672 km^{2}) is land and 272.4 square miles (706 km^{2}) (51.20%) is water. It is the largest town in New York in terms of total area, excluding water. However, there are four towns in the state with more land area: Arietta in Hamilton County, Long Lake in Hamilton County, Ohio in Herkimer County and Webb in Herkimer County.

Brookhaven is bounded by Long Island Sound to the north, the Atlantic Ocean to the south, Riverhead to the northeast, Southampton to the southeast, Smithtown to the northwest, and Islip to the southwest.

A large part of Fire Island (accessible by a bridge at Smith Point) and the Great South Bay are in the town.

Bald Hill, a large hill in the hamlet of Farmingville, marks where the glacier which formed Long Island stopped. At the top of Bald Hill is a Vietnam veterans memorial. Telescope Hill, to the west of Bald Hill Cultural Park, is slightly taller at 334 feet (102 m) above sea level and the highest point in the town.

=== Climate ===
The climate of the town is hot-summer humid continental (Dfa) except in the coastal areas where it is humid subtropical (Cfa). The following are the averages in Upton from 1981 to 2010:

Climate data for Brookhaven, New York (National Weather Service Forecast Office, Brookhaven National Laboratory, Upton, New York)
Month	Jan	Feb	Mar	Apr	May	Jun	Jul	Aug	Sep	Oct	Nov	Dec	Year
Record high °F (°C)	67 (19)	68 (20)	83 (28)	90 (32)	97 (36)	99 (37)	98 (37)	102 (39)	97 (36)	85 (29)	77 (25)	68 (20)	102 (39)
Mean daily maximum °F (°C)	38.3 (3.5)	40.1 (4.5)	47.0 (8.3)	57.5 (14.2)	67.8 (19.9)	76.3 (24.6)	81.6 (27.6)	80.6 (27.0)	74.3 (23.5)	63.3 (17.4)	52.9 (11.6)	43.9 (6.6)	60.3 (15.7)
Mean daily minimum °F (°C)	21.1 (−6.1)	22.0 (−5.6)	29.1 (−1.6)	38.4 (3.6)	48.2 (9.0)	58.4 (14.7)	64.5 (18.1)	62.8 (17.1)	55.5 (13.1)	44.0 (6.7)	34.2 (1.2)	27.4 (−2.6)	42.1 (5.6)
Record low °F (°C)	−13 (−25)	−8 (−22)	−7 (−22)	12 (−11)	28 (−2)	34 (1)	45 (7)	40 (4)	30 (−1)	17 (−8)	9 (−13)	−6 (−21)	−13 (−25)
Average precipitation inches (mm)	4.04 (103)	3.86 (98)	4.94 (125)	4.19 (106)	3.65 (93)	3.94 (100)	3.71 (94)	4.52 (115)	4.20 (107)	4.30 (109)	3.76 (96)	4.86 (123)	49.97 (1,269)
Average snowfall inches (cm)	9.6 (24)	9.4 (24)	5.1 (13)	1.3 (3.3)	0 (0)	0 (0)	0 (0)	0 (0)	0 (0)	0 (0)	0.7 (1.8)	4.0 (10)	30.1 (76)
Source: NOAA

=== Physical features ===
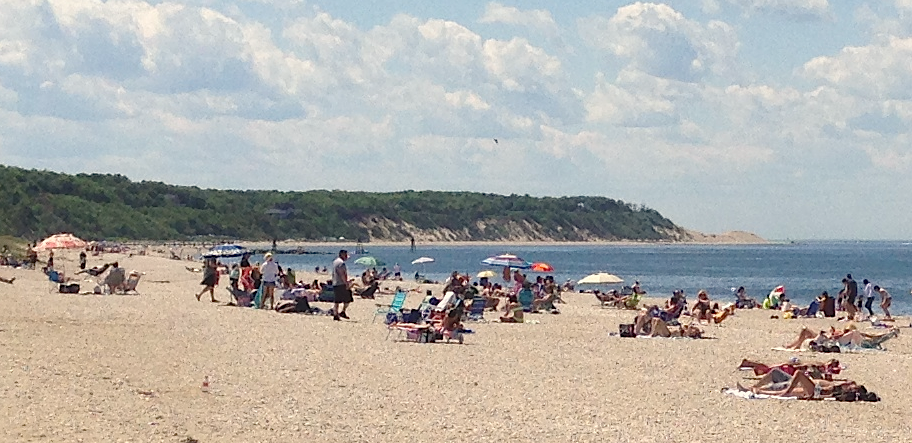
Sunbathers at Cedar Beach on the Long Island Sound

- Outer Barrier
- Fire Island
- Great South Bay
  - Patchogue Bay
  - Bellport Bay
  - Narrow Bay
  - Moriches Bay

== Demographics ==
Historical population
Census	Pop.	Note	%±
1790	3,224		—
1800	4,022		24.8%
1810	4,176		3.8%
1820	5,218		25.0%
1830	6,095		16.8%
1840	7,050		15.7%
1850	8,595		21.9%
1860	9,923		15.5%
1870	10,159		2.4%
1880	11,544		13.6%
1890	12,772		10.6%
1900	14,592		14.2%
1910	16,737		14.7%
1920	21,847		30.5%
1930	28,291		29.5%
1940	32,118		13.5%
1950	44,522		38.6%
1960	109,900		146.8%
1970	245,260		123.2%
1980	364,812		48.7%
1990	407,779		11.8%
2000	448,248		9.9%
2010	486,040		8.4%
2020	485,773		−0.1%

As of the 2020 United States census, there were 485,773 people residing in the town. The population density was 1,873.4/sq mi (723.3/km^{2}). The racial makeup of the town was 83.0% White (including 72.0% Non-Hispanic Whites), 6.1% Black or African American, 0.1% Native American, 4.7% Asian, 0.1% Pacific Islander, and 3.8% from two or more races. Hispanic or Latino people of any race were 15.6% of the population.

== Economy ==
According to Brookhaven's 2009 Comprehensive Annual Financial Report, the top employers in the town are:

#	Employer	# of Employees	Location
1	Stony Brook University	13,623	Stony Brook
2	Internal Revenue Service	3,332	Holtsville
3	Sachem School District	3,100	Holbrook
4	Brookhaven National Laboratory	2,500	Upton
5	John T. Mather Memorial Hospital	2,047	Port Jefferson
6	Long Island Community Hospital	2,030	East Patchogue
7	St. Charles Hospital	1,520	Port Jefferson
8	Three Village Central School District	1,454	East Setauket
9	Verizon	1,440	Patchogue
10	William Floyd School District	1,300	Mastic Beach

== Attractions ==
- Cupsogue Beach County Park
- Fire Island National Seashore in Cherry Grove, Fire Island Pines, and Davis Park
- Manor St. George in Shirley
- Old Field Point Light in Old Field
- Smith Haven Mall in Lake Grove
- Smith Point County Park in Shirley/Mastic Beach
- Southaven County Park in South Haven
- Splish Splash water park in Calverton
- Stony Brook Village Center in Stony Brook
- Watch Hill
- Wertheim National Wildlife Refuge
- William Floyd House in Mastic Beach

== Government and politics ==
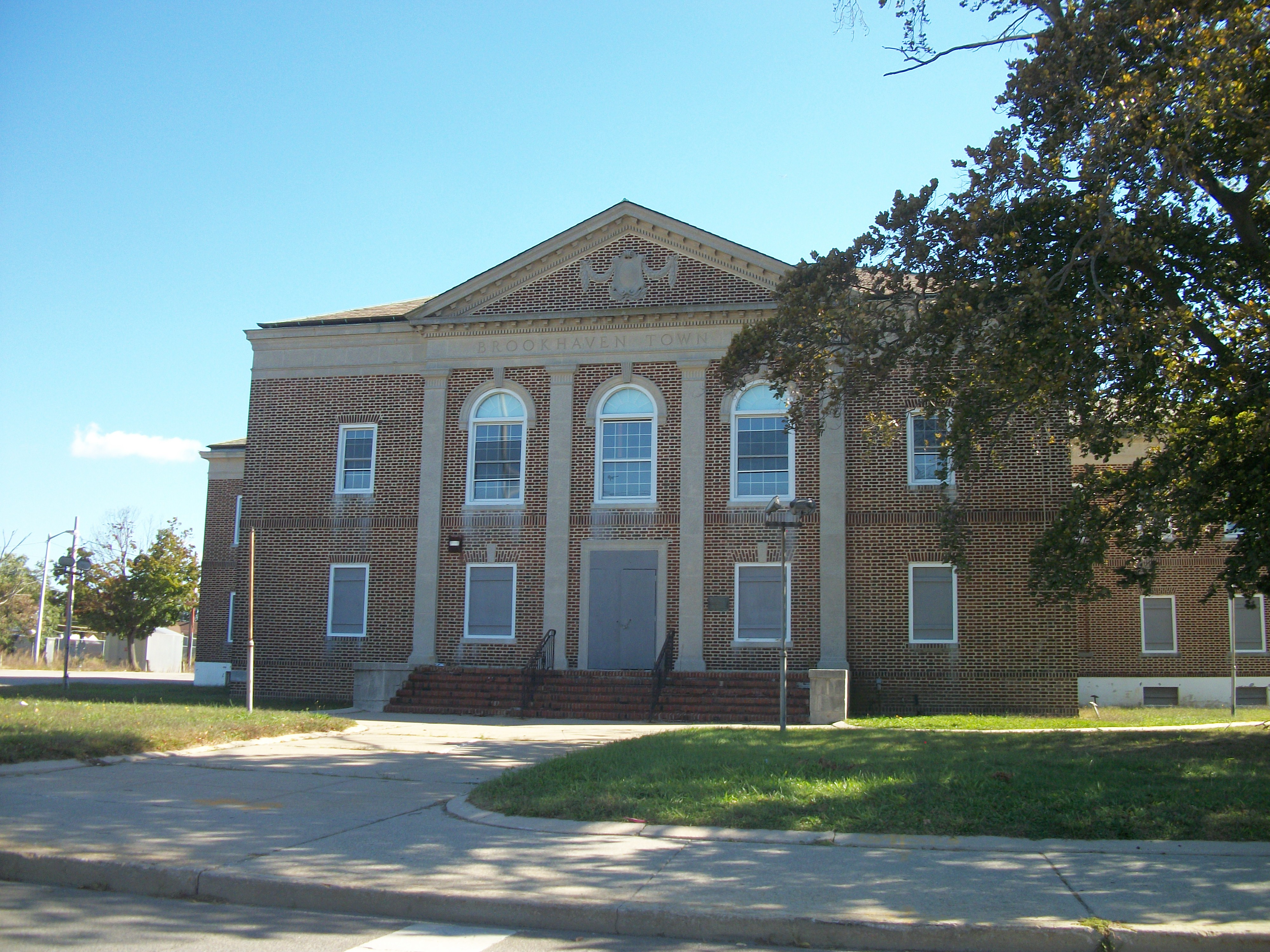
The former Brookhaven Town Hall in Patchogue

Patchogue was the town seat of Brookhaven until 1986. The seat moved to Medford and then its current location near Bald Hill in Farmingville.

Brookhaven is led by a town supervisor and a six-member town council, which are all four-year term elected positions. Council members have been elected by district since a referendum in 2002.

Before 2002, the local Republican Party for the Town of Brookhaven nearly controlled the entirety of the town board for several decades, except for four years in the mid-1970s when Democrats held a majority under Supervisor John Randolph.

This one-party domination, and a series of scandals, led to a tarnished reputation of local politics and accorded the nickname "Crookhaven".

After the referendum was passed In 2002, Steve Fiore-Rosenfield became the first Democrat elected since the 1970s in 2003.

In 2005, Brian X. Foley, a Democratic county legislator, won the town supervisor race. Constance Kepert and Carol Bissonette were also elected to the town board. With Fiore-Rosenfield's re-election, the Democrats gained control of the Brookhaven town board for the first time since the 1970s.

In 2007, councilwoman Carol Bissonette chose not to pursue re-election but to instead run for the open receiver of taxes seat. Her district (the 6th) was won by Republican Keith Romaine, returning the town to a 4-3 majority on the town board. The new majority opted to elect Councilman Tim Mazzei as the majority leader.

In 2008, Brian X. Foley was elected to the New York State Senate. As per New York state law, his seat was declared vacant, and a special election was held on March 31, 2009, to replace him. Democrat Mark Lesko defeated Majority Leader Mazzei to become supervisor. In August 2012, Lesko chose to step down and join a tech company on Long Island. A special election was held on November 6, 2012, which was won by Republican county legislator Edward P. Romaine, who had previously served as county clerk. With Romaine's victory and the subsequent victories of Daniel Losquadro in 2013 for the special election of highway superintendent and Independence Party of New York member Donna Lent to town clerk, the Republican party and its endorsed allies won all townwide seats for the first time since former supervisor John Jay LaValle.

== Communities and locations ==
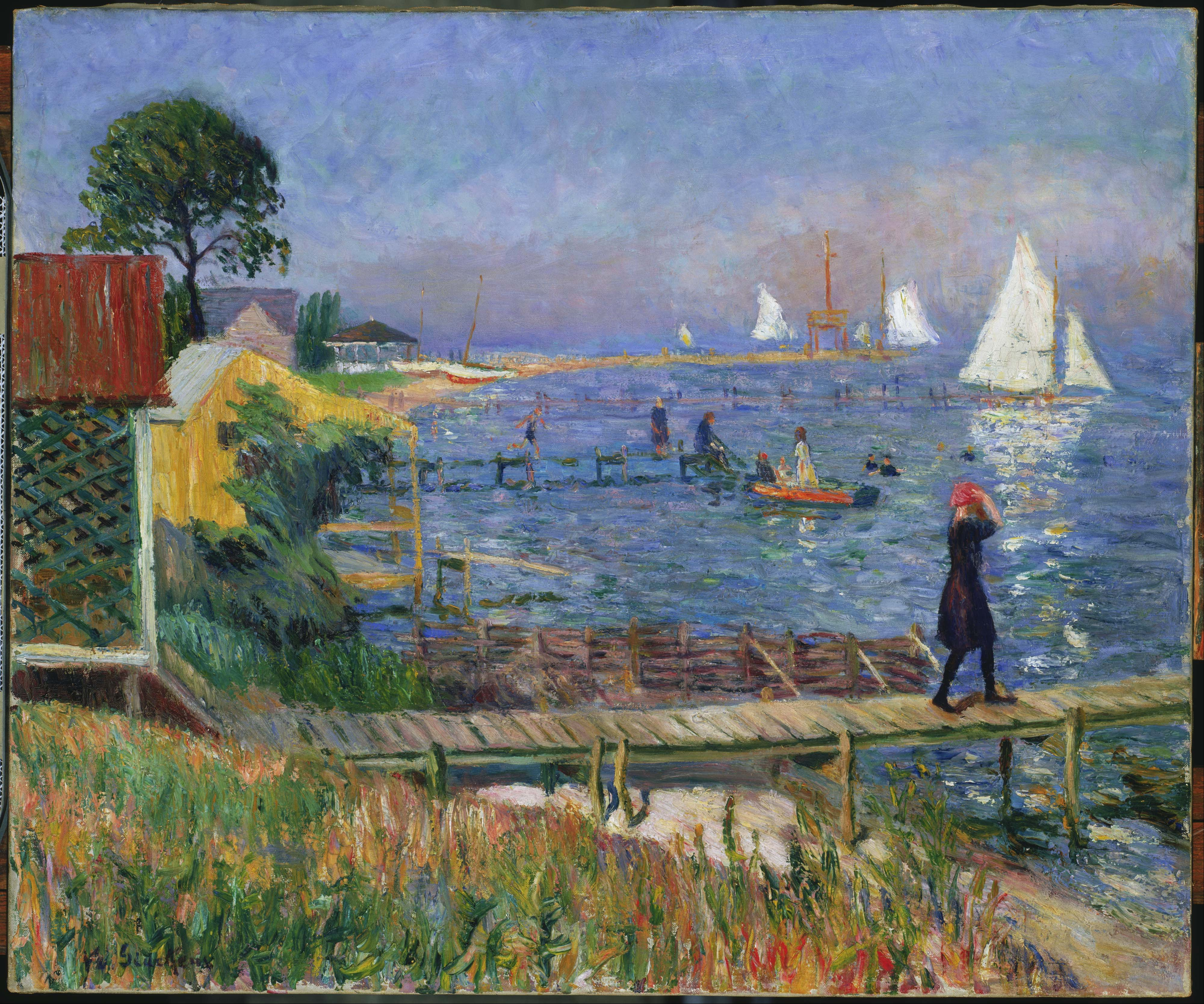
Bathers at Bellport by William Glackens

=== Villages (incorporated) ===
Brookhaven has eight villages:

- Belle Terre
- Bellport
- Lake Grove
- Old Field
- Patchogue
- Poquott
- Port Jefferson
- Shoreham

=== Hamlets (unincorporated) ===
Brookhaven includes all or part of approximately 50 hamlets. One of those hamlets is also named Brookhaven.

- Blue Point (small part in Town of Islip)
- Brookhaven
- Calverton (mostly in Town of Riverhead)
- Center Moriches
- Centereach
- Cherry Grove
- Coram
- Davis Park
- East Moriches
- East Patchogue
- East Setauket
- East Shoreham
- Eastport (Eastern portion in Town of Southampton)
- Farmingville
- Fire Island Pines
- Gordon Heights
- Hagerman (Part of East Patchogue CDP)
- Holbrook (mostly in Town of Islip)
- Holtsville (small part in Town of Islip)
- Lake Ronkonkoma (small parts in Towns of Islip and Smithtown)
- Manorville (small part in Town of Riverhead)
- Mastic
- Mastic Beach (Note: Mastic Beach, previously an incorporated village which was dissolved on December 31, 2017)
- Medford
- Middle Island
- Miller Place
- Moriches
- Mount Sinai
- North Bellport
- North Patchogue
- Ocean Bay Park
- Port Jefferson Station
- Point O'Woods
- Ridge
- Rocky Point
- Ronkonkoma (mostly in Town of Islip)
- Selden
- Setauket
- Shirley
- Sound Beach
- South Haven
- Stony Brook
- Strongs Neck
- Terryville
- Upton
- Wading River (mostly in Town of Riverhead)
- Water Island
- West Manor
- Yaphank

=== Other communities ===
- Bayberry Dunes
- Bellview Beach
- Canaan Lake
- Coram Hill
- Crystal Brook
- East Yaphank
- Hallock Landing
- Old Mastic
- Poospatuck Reservation
- Rocky Point Landing
- Patchogue Highlands
- Siegfried Park
- South Manor
- South Medford
- South Setauket
- South Yaphank
- Squassux Landing
- Smith Point
- Wading River Landing
- West Yaphank
- Woodhull Landing
- East Selden (Selden)

== Education ==
Brookhaven is the home of Stony Brook University, which moved to Stony Brook from its original Oyster Bay campus in 1962; the university has since become the town's largest employer. The town is home to the first and largest campus of Suffolk County Community College, located in Selden. The town is also home to The Stony Brook School, a Christian college prep and boarding school in Stony Brook. The St. Joseph's University's Long Island Campus is located in Patchogue.

Brookhaven Public Schools over-sees the 11 School Districts, 15 High Schools and 63,500 Students within the town.

== Transportation ==
=== Major roads ===
Notable Roads.

- I-495 (Long Island Expressway)
- New York State Route 25A
- New York State Route 25
- New York State Route 24
- New York State Route 27
- New York State Route 112
- New York State Route 347
- County Route 16
- Montauk Highway, including County Route 85 and County Route 80
- County Route 97
- County Route 83
- County Route 46
- County Route 51
- County Route 111

=== Bus service ===
The Town of Brookhaven is served primarily by Suffolk County Transit. It also operates a Para-Transit Bus line. The Village of Patchogue operates its own local Bus Service.

=== Railroad lines ===
Long Island Rail Road has three lines running through the Town of Brookhaven. The Main Line includes Ronkonkoma station, which not only serves as a major transportation hub, but is also located on the Islip-Brookhaven Town Line. It also contains the Medford and Yaphank stations. The Montauk Branch, located on the South Shore of Long Island, includes the Patchogue, Bellport, and Mastic–Shirley stations, with the Center Moriches station having operated until 1998. On the North Shore of the town, the Port Jefferson Branch contains two stations as it enters from the Town of Smithtown, Stony Brook station along the northern edge of SUNY at Stony Brook, and Port Jefferson station along Main Street where the line terminates.

=== Ferries ===
The primary ferry within the Town of Brookhaven is the Bridgeport & Port Jefferson Ferry, which takes vehicles and passengers across the Long Island Sound to and from Port Jefferson to Bridgeport, Connecticut. On the Great South Bay, passenger ferries take vacationers to and from Fire Island. The ferry terminals in Patchogue lead to the communities of Davis Park, and Watch Hill Visitor Center, on the western edge of the Otis Pike Fire Island High Dune Wilderness Area. Bellport also has a ferry leading to Bellport Beach on Fire Island.

From Fire Island itself, communities have ferries from Fire Island Pines and Cherry Grove, both of which are popular vacation spots for LGBT tourists as well as the Sailors Haven Visitor Center, which is located within the Sunken Forest Visitor Center. All three ferries lead to Sayville in the Town of Islip. Ocean Bay Park is the westernmost community in the Town of Brookhaven, and ferries from there lead to Bay Shore.

=== Airports ===
The Town of Brookhaven contains no Commercial Airports. The adjacent Town of Islip contains Long Island MacArthur Airport which serves Brookhaven Residents, three Minor Reliever Airports are within Brookhaven, all of which are in the southern shore communities. The first one is the Brookhaven Calabro Airport in Shirley. East of this is the Spadaro Airport and Lufker Airport both of which are in East Moriches, and both of which share a taxiway. Coram Airport was operational until 1984.

== Notable people ==
- Tapping Reeve

== See also ==
- National Register of Historic Places listings in Brookhaven (town), New York
