= Caroline Church and Cemetery =

Historic site in Suffolk County, New York, US

- U.S. National Register of Historic Places
- U.S. Historic district
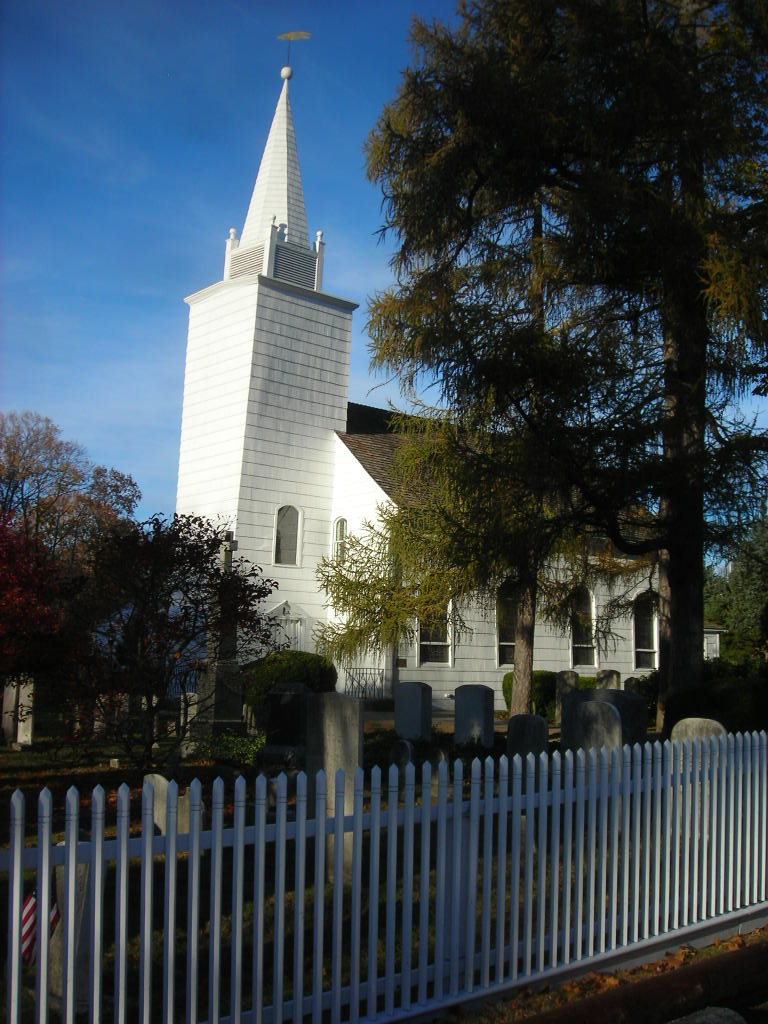
- Caroline Church and Cemetery, November 2007

- Location within New York Location within the United States
- Location: Jct. of Dyke and Bates Rds., Setauket, New York
- Coordinates: 40°56′49″N 73°6′46″W
- Area: 6 acres (2.4 ha)
- Built: 1729
- Architect: Sears, John; Smythe, Richard Haviland
- NRHP reference No.: 91001148
- Added to NRHP: September 09, 1991

Caroline Church and Cemetery is a historic Episcopal church and cemetery and also a national historic district at the junction of Dyke and Bates Roads in Setauket, Suffolk County, New York. The church was built in 1729 and is a three-by-four-bay, heavy timber-framed, 42 by 30 foot building sheathed in wood shingles and covered by a gable roof. It features a 42-foot tower surmounted by a 25-foot spire. The complex also includes the parish house, built in 1905, and a barn built in 1893. The cemetery was established in 1734.

It was added to the National Register of Historic Places in 1991.

== Images ==
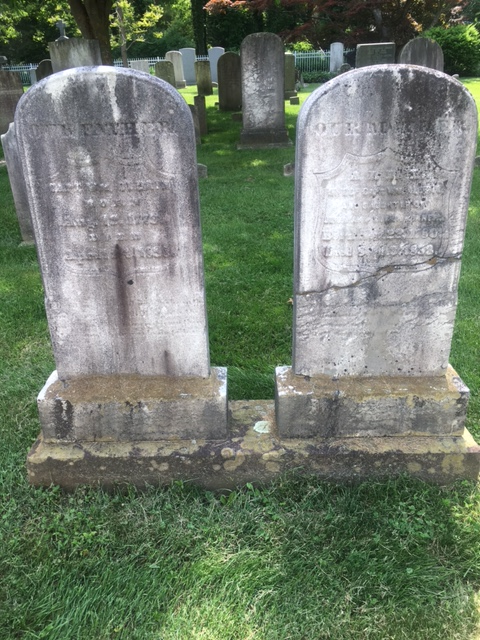
Captain William Oldrin (1773–1858) and Almy Kinner (1780–1853) tombstone
