= Mastic Beach, New York =

- Hamlet and Census-designated place
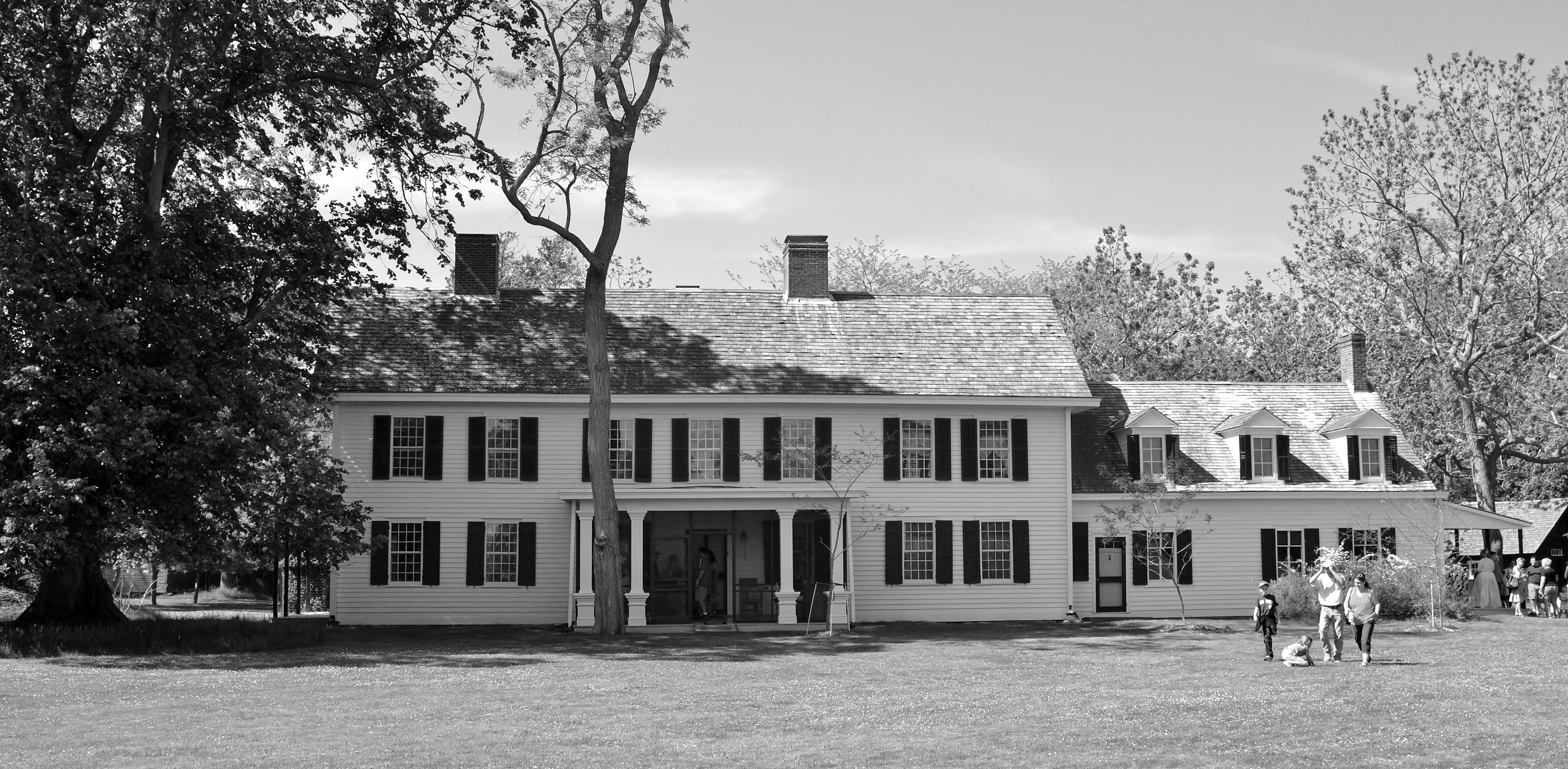
- The William Floyd House in Mastic Beach.

- Location within Suffolk County and the State of New York.

- Location within New York
- Coordinates: 40°45′41″N 72°50′47″W
- Country: United States
- State: New York
- County: Suffolk
- Town: Brookhaven
- Incorporated: August 31, 2010
- Dissolved: December 31, 2017

Area
  - Total: 6.00 sq mi (15.55 km^{2})
  - Land: 4.90 sq mi (12.69 km^{2})
  - Water: 1.10 sq mi (2.86 km^{2})
- Elevation: 6.6 ft (2 m)

Population (2020)
  - Total: 14,199
  - Density: 2,898.7/sq mi (1,119.19/km^{2})
- Time zone: UTC−05:00 (Eastern Time Zone)
  - Summer (DST): UTC−04:00
- ZIP Code: 11951
- Area codes: 631, 934
- FIPS code: 36-46085
- GNIS feature ID: 0970340

Mastic Beach is a hamlet and census-designated place, and former village in the southeastern part of the Town of Brookhaven in Suffolk County, on Long Island, in New York, United States. As of the 2020 census, Mastic Beach had a population of 14,199.

== History ==
In 2010, a group of residents sought to incorporate Mastic Beach as a village. Petitioners blamed the town of Brookhaven for not doing enough code enforcement on blighted streets and eyesore buildings, believing more diligent code enforcement under village control would improve the community aesthetics. Opponents were concerned that creating the village would increase taxes, and that estimates for the proposed village's total budget were low. At $549,500 annually, the village would take up building code enforcement, leaving police, fire, and sanitation to Brookhaven.

After a vote on August 31, 2010, incorporation was approved. The proposed incorporation needed to be passed by a majority in order for the hamlet to become a village. The first elected mayor was Paul Breschard.

The boundaries of the village of Mastic Beach differed from those of the previous census-designated place (CDP). The village did not include the William Floyd House grounds as well as a few blocks in the extreme southwest of the CDP, but it added several blocks west of Mastic Road and Commack Road.

=== Dissolution ===
Residents voted 1,922 to 1,215 on November 8, 2016, to revert to an unincorporated area with services handled by the Town of Brookhaven. The decision to dissolve the village was decided upon due to political issues and fiscal concerns.

A formal dissolution plan was developed over several months and approved by the Village Board (4–1) at a special meeting on March 16, 2017. The dissolution took place on January 1, 2018.

== Geography ==
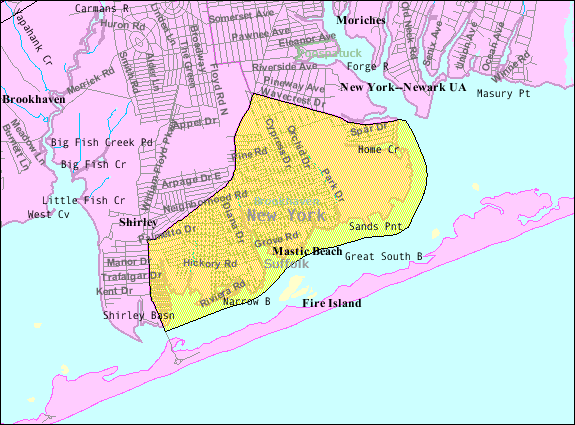
U.S. Census map of Mastic Beach.

According to the United States Census Bureau, the CDP had a total area of 5.3 square miles (14 km^{2}), of which 4.2 square miles (11 km^{2}) was land and 1.1 square miles (2.8 km^{2}), or 20.34%, was water.

Mastic Beach is located on the South Shore of Long Island roughly 70 miles (110 km) from New York City, and is accessible via the Long Island Rail Road's Montauk Branch. Nearby are Smith Point County Park and the Fire Island National Seashore. It is on a peninsula extending into Moriches Bay.

Mastic Beach is located in the Forge River–Moriches Bay Watershed, and is located within the larger Long Island Sound/Atlantic Ocean Watershed.

== Demographics ==
Historical population
Census	Pop.	Note	%±
2010	14,849		—
2020	14,199		−4.4%
U.S. Decennial Census

=== 2020 census ===
As of the 2020 census, Mastic Beach had a population of 14,199. The median age was 37.5 years. 24.3% of residents were under the age of 18 and 12.2% of residents were 65 years of age or older. For every 100 females there were 99.7 males, and for every 100 females age 18 and over there were 96.3 males age 18 and over.

98.7% of residents lived in urban areas, while 1.3% lived in rural areas.

There were 4,677 households in Mastic Beach, of which 35.5% had children under the age of 18 living in them. Of all households, 43.6% were married-couple households, 18.9% were households with a male householder and no spouse or partner present, and 27.3% were households with a female householder and no spouse or partner present. About 19.8% of all households were made up of individuals and 7.6% had someone living alone who was 65 years of age or older.

There were 5,198 housing units, of which 10.0% were vacant. The homeowner vacancy rate was 2.9% and the rental vacancy rate was 5.4%.

Racial composition as of the 2020 census
Race	Number	Percent
White	8,927	62.9%
Black or African American	1,869	13.2%
American Indian and Alaska Native	112	0.8%
Asian	221	1.6%
Native Hawaiian and Other Pacific Islander	7	0.0%
Some other race	1,301	9.2%
Two or more races	1,762	12.4%
Hispanic or Latino (of any race)	3,160	22.3%

=== 2000 census ===
As of the census of 2000, there were 11,543 people, 3,755 households, and 2,793 families residing in the CDP. The population density was 2,727.9 inhabitants per square mile (1,053.2/km^{2}). There were 4,375 housing units at an average density of 1,033.9 per square mile (399.2/km^{2}). The racial makeup of the CDP was 88.16% White, 5.02% African American, 0.49% Native American, 0.91% Asian, 0.01% Pacific Islander, 2.64% from other races, and 2.77% from two or more races. Hispanic or Latino of any race were 10.59% of the population.

There were 3,755 households, out of which 42.6% had children under the age of 18 living with them, 51.3% were married couples living together, 16.1% had a female householder with no husband present, and 25.6% were non-families. 18.4% of all households were made up of individuals, and 6.3% had someone living alone who was 65 years of age or older. The average household size was 3.07 and the average family size was 3.49.

In the CDP, the population was spread out, with 31.8% under the age of 18, 8.5% from 18 to 24, 32.4% from 25 to 44, 19.7% from 45 to 64, and 7.5% who were 65 years of age or older. The median age was 32 years. For every 100 females, there were 99.8 males. For every 100 females age 18 and over, there were 96.4 males.

The median income for a household in the CDP was $44,937, and the median income for a family was $49,219. Males had a median income of $37,871 versus $27,853 for females. The per capita income for the CDP was $17,046. About 9.2% of families and 11.3% of the population were below the poverty threshold, including 14.3% of those under age 18 and 8.1% of those age 65 or over.

== Education ==
Mastic Beach is served by the William Floyd School District.

== Media ==
- Tri Hamlet News, online news for Mastic • Shirley • Moriches

== Notable people ==
- Kim Barnes Arico, born in Mastic Beach
- Joe Smith Jr., boxer, former light heavyweight world champion
