= Moriches, New York =

- Hamlet and census-designated place
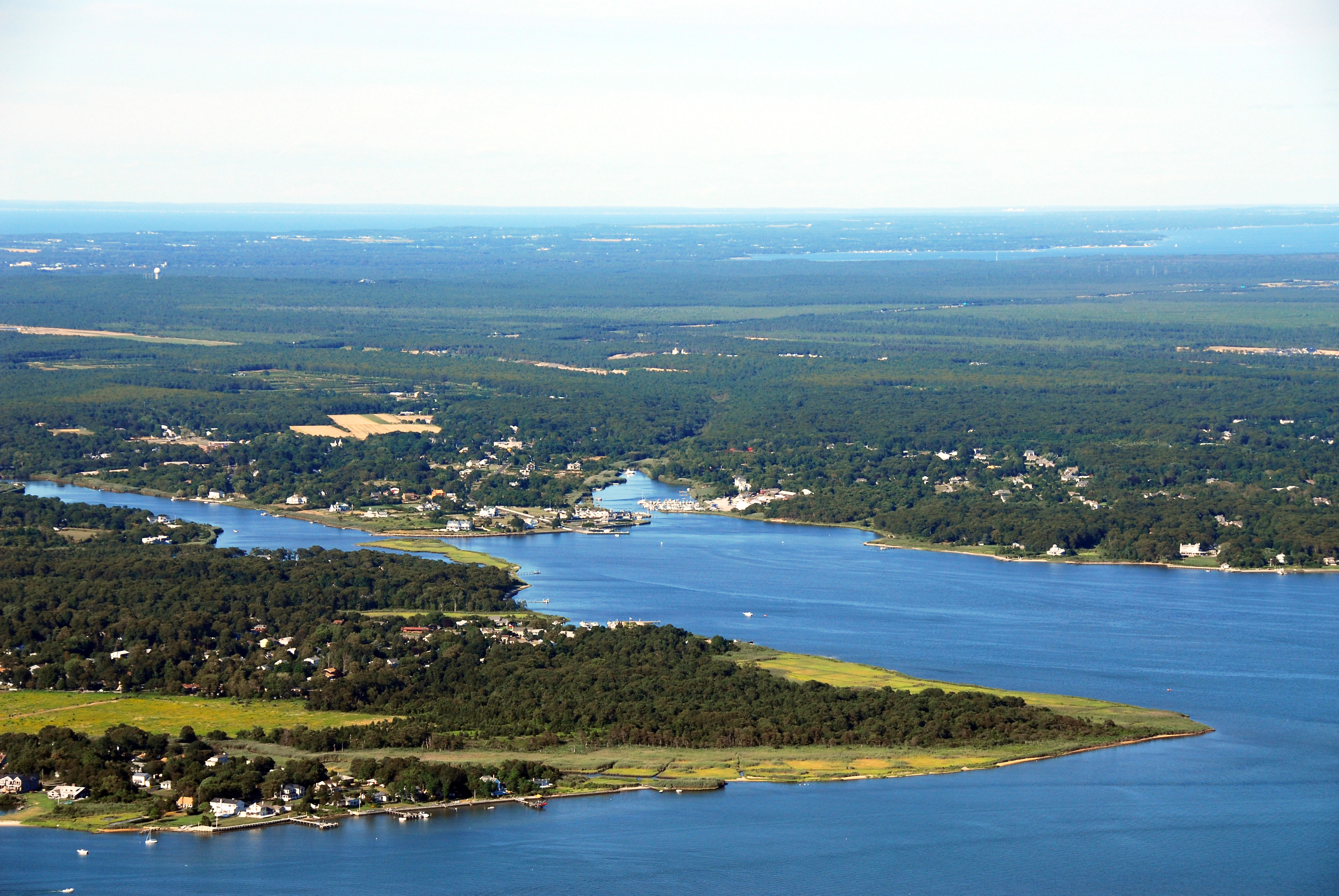
- Moriches Inlet aerial view. Moriches pictured there-above
- Nickname: AntiHamptons
- Motto: Long Island's Best Kept Secret
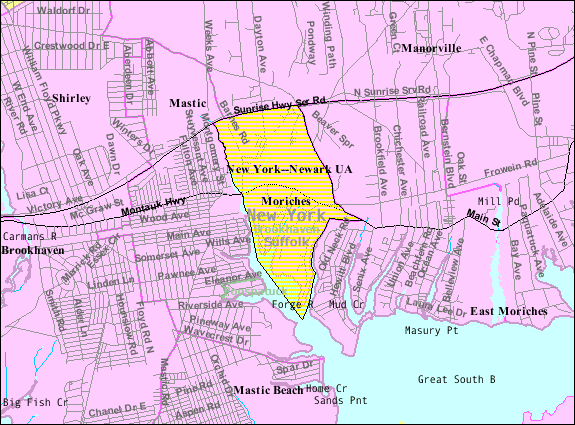

- Location in state of New York Moriches (New York)
- Coordinates: 40°48′10″N 72°49′21″W
- Country: United States
- State: New York
- County: Suffolk

Area
  - Total: 2.30 sq mi (5.96 km^{2})
  - Land: 2.07 sq mi (5.37 km^{2})
  - Water: 0.23 sq mi (0.59 km^{2})
- Elevation: 23 ft (7 m)

Population (2020)
  - Total: 3,026
  - Density: 1,460.4/sq mi (563.87/km^{2})
- Time zone: UTC−05:00 (Eastern Time Zone)
  - Summer (DST): UTC−04:00
- ZIP Code: 11955
- Area codes: 631, 934
- FIPS code: 36-48450
- GNIS feature ID: 0970369

Moriches (/moʊˈrɪtʃɪz/ moh-RITCH-iz) is a hamlet and census-designated place (CDP) in the Suffolk County town of Brookhaven, New York, United States. As of the 2020 census, Moriches had a population of 3,026.

== History ==
The name "Moriches" comes from Meritces, a Native American who owned land on Moriches Neck.

One of the community's most notable businesses/landmarks was the Jurgielewicz Duck Farm founded in 1919 on the edge of the Forge River. At its peak, the 65-acre (26 ha) farm located on the edge of the Montauk Branch of the Long Island Rail Road claimed to be America's largest free-range duck operation, raising one million Pekin ducks per year. In 2011, it declared bankruptcy, and it closed in August of that year.

== Geography ==
According to the United States Census Bureau, the CDP has a total area of 2.3 square miles (5.9 km^{2}), of which 2.0 square miles (5.3 km^{2}) is land and 0.23 square miles (0.6 km^{2}), or 9.99%, is water.

Historical population
Census	Pop.	Note	%±
2020	3,026		—
U.S. Decennial Census

== Demographics ==
=== 2020 census ===
As of the 2020 census, Moriches had a population of 3,026. The median age was 46.7 years. 17.7% of residents were under the age of 18 and 25.6% of residents were 65 years of age or older. For every 100 females there were 94.6 males, and for every 100 females age 18 and over there were 88.2 males age 18 and over.

100.0% of residents lived in urban areas, while 0.0% lived in rural areas.

There were 1,361 households in Moriches, of which 23.5% had children under the age of 18 living in them. Of all households, 41.0% were married-couple households, 18.2% were households with a male householder and no spouse or partner present, and 31.2% were households with a female householder and no spouse or partner present. About 32.0% of all households were made up of individuals and 15.3% had someone living alone who was 65 years of age or older.

There were 1,460 housing units, of which 6.8% were vacant. The homeowner vacancy rate was 1.9% and the rental vacancy rate was 2.9%.

Racial composition as of the 2020 census
Race	Number	Percent
White	2,217	73.3%
Black or African American	343	11.3%
American Indian and Alaska Native	15	0.5%
Asian	57	1.9%
Native Hawaiian and Other Pacific Islander	0	0.0%
Some other race	115	3.8%
Two or more races	279	9.2%
Hispanic or Latino (of any race)	390	12.9%

=== 2000 census ===
As of the 2000 census, there were 2,319 people, 1,116 households, and 669 families residing in the CDP. The population density was 1,190.6 inhabitants per square mile (459.7/km^{2}). There were 1,212 housing units at an average density of 622.3 per square mile (240.3/km^{2}). The racial makeup of the CDP was 94.91% White, 1.25% African American, 0.13% Native American, 1.81% Asian, 0.65% from other races, and 1.25% from two or more races. Hispanic or Latino of any race were 3.97% of the population.

There were 1,116 households, out of which 13.9% had children under the age of 18 living with them, 52.1% were married couples living together, 5.5% had a female householder with no husband present, and 40.0% were non-families. 30.9% of all households were made up of individuals, and 10.5% had someone living alone who was 65 years of age or older. The average household size was 2.05 and the average family size was 2.56.

In the CDP, the population was spread out, with 11.5% under the age of 18, 6.4% from 18 to 24, 31.4% from 25 to 44, 27.5% from 45 to 64, and 23.2% who were 65 years of age or older. The median age was 46 years. For every 100 females, there were 100.8 males. For every 100 females age 18 and over, there were 99.8 males.

The median income for a household in the CDP was $63,672, and the median income for a family was $74,659. Males had a median income of $51,205 versus $35,950 for females. The per capita income for the CDP was $34,038. About 2.9% of families and 5.5% of the population were below the poverty threshold, including 6.4% of those under age 18 and 6.7% of those age 65 or over.

== Education ==
Moriches is served by the William Floyd School District.

== See also ==
- Moriches Bay
- Moriches Inlet
- Outer Barrier
