= Stony Brook Village Center =

Shopping mall in Stony Brook, New York

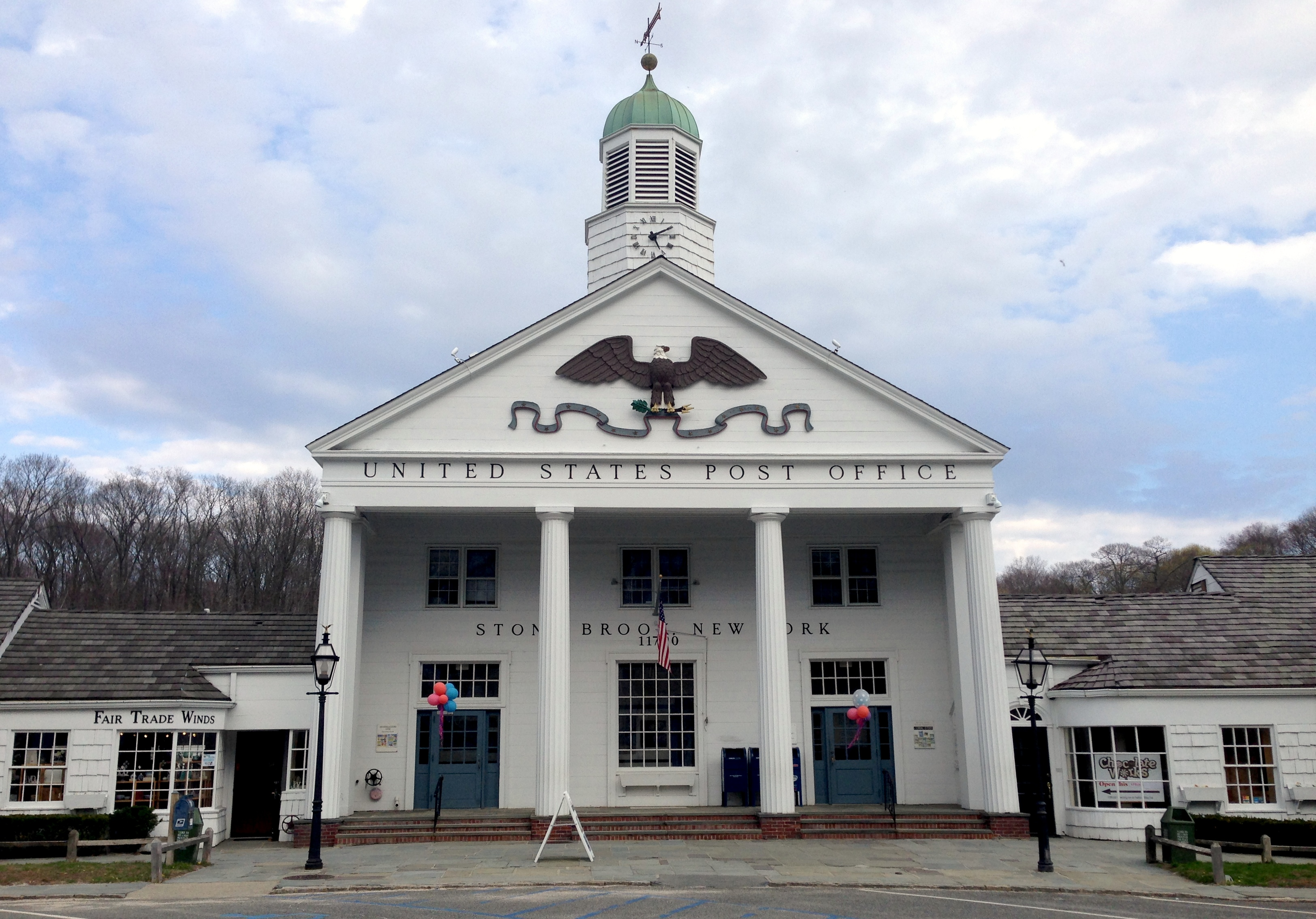
- The Stony Brook Post Office, centerpiece of the main crescent of shops
- Location: Stony Brook, New York
- Coordinates: 40°55′2″N 73°08′45″W
- Address: 111 Main Street, Stony Brook, NY
- Opened: 1941
- Owner: Ward Melville Heritage Organization

Stony Brook Village Center is a colonial-style campus of businesses located in downtown Stony Brook, New York. Some 60 miles from Manhattan, the village center was the creation of philanthropist and businessman Ward Melville. The center blends shopping, restaurants, history, music, art and nature. Now consisting of 35 shops, it includes small locally owned businesses and national stores like Chico's and LOFT, as well as seven eateries.

Surrounded by history and National and State landmarks, Stony Brook Village Center exists as the window to the past, and a door to the future of lifestyle communities. The Stony Brook Grist Mill (c. 1751), and the Hercules Pavilion, which houses the U.S.S Ohio's Hercules figurehead and the Polaris Whaleboat (the only surviving artifact of the 1870 Charles Hall expedition to the arctic) are a two-minute walk from the center. Immediately across from the center is Avalon Park and Preserve, a 140-acre park with multiple trails for the public year-round.

Other environs of Stony Brook Village Center include the Three Village Inn, the Jazz Loft and the Long Island Museum. The Three Village Inn is a historic establishment that offers lodging both at the main house and in cottages, as well as 250 seat restaurant. The Mirabelle Restaurant and Tavern is located inside the inn, with Executive Chef Guy Reuge providing “fresh-meets-French cuisine”. The Jazz Loft is a museum and music venue that resides directly across from the Three Village Inn on one side, and Stony Brook Village Center on the other. The Long Island Museum, which holds exhibits of American art, history and carriages and the historic Country House Restaurant (c. 1710) are moments away at the entrance to the village.

== History ==
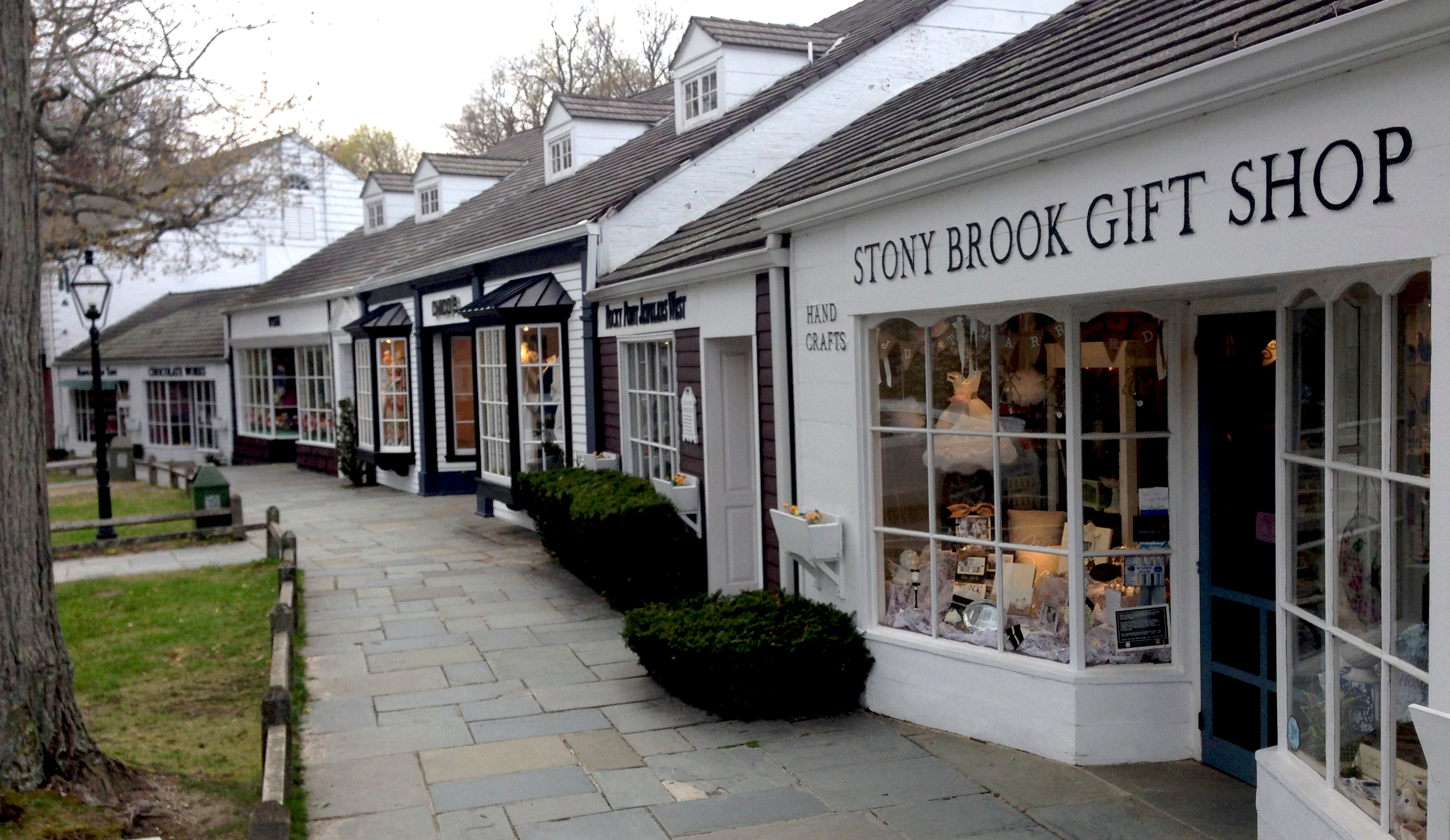
Boutique shops in the Stony Brook Village Center

Looking to escape the stresses of city life at the dawn of the twentieth century, Brooklyn residents Frank and Jennie Melville planned a Long Island summer retreat with their son, Ward. Intending to reach the popular Hamptons on the East End of Long Island, they accidentally boarded the wrong train and instead traveled to the hamlet of Stony Brook.

Ultimately falling in love with the quaint village, Frank and Jennie immersed themselves in local life. Jennie urged civic cooperation among the three neighboring communities of Stony Brook, Old Field, and Setauket and tagged them the “Three Villages,” while Frank served on civic boards and the Chamber of Commerce.

In 1922, Ward Melville succeeded his father as Chief Executive Officer of the Melville Corporation - the third largest retailer in the United States at the time (with chains that would later include CVS Drugs, Marshalls, KB Toys, etc.) - and purchased the land surrounding the location of where Stony Brook Village Center would be built. Ward joined in his parents’ passion for conservation and economic development. He actively worked to formulate a plan to fulfill Jennie Melville’s dream of a beautiful, planned business community with the help of his wife, Dorothy.

Starting in 1939, Ward extensively renovated the Old Hallock Homestead he had inherited from his mother, and renamed it the Three Village Inn. At a meeting at the Three Village Inn in January 1939, only six years after the Great Depression, Melville invited the existing businesses and presented his plan - a living Williamsburg, complete with colonial-styled shops, cast iron lampposts and bluestone walkways. He sought the community’s approval – and received it. He would pay for everything with his own funds.

Once construction was completed in 1941, Stony Brook Village Center became the first planned business community in the United States. A business community was an important way to promote entrepreneurship and interaction. Melville used $500,000 of his own funds - the equivalent of nine million dollars today - into rehabilitating and reinventing Stony Brook Village. The enormous undertaking also included the moving or razing 35 buildings, rerouting roads, relocating large trees, and moving one million cubic yards of dirt. A two-acre Village Green was created opening the vista to the harbor. The new Stony Brook Village Center, which now housed many of the existing businesses of old Stony Brook, was completed in the summer of 1941, and the last merchant opened December 7, 1941. It has long been recognized as the first planned shopping center in the country. In fact, it is where the American Institute of Architects held their annual meeting for many years.

After completion, he deeded everything to the Stony Brook Community Fund, a not for profit organization, so that he could not be accused of personal gain. Stony Brook Community Fund would later be renamed the Ward Melville Heritage Organization in 1996.

== Today ==
Today, the center is considered a lifestyle center and has a combination of convenience stores and specialty stores. It still retains its small town flavor being home to a cleaners, optician, post office, deli, flower shop, wine store, beauty salon, barber, dentist and gas station. In addition to these convenience stores, the center has specialty shops such as several dress shops, a children’s clothing shop, and olive oil store, a coffee store, a jewelry store, a furniture store and seven restaurants, as well as a concert hall and museum.

Stony Brook Village Center is open seven days a week.
