= William Floyd School District =

School district in New York, United States

William Floyd Union Free School District
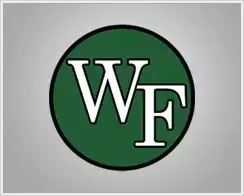

Address
- 240 Mastic Beach Road Mastic Beach, New York 11951 United States

District information
- Type: Public
- Grades: K-12
- Superintendent: Kevin Coster
- Schools: 8
- NCES District ID: 3618690
- District ID: 580232030000

Students and staff
- Students: 8,653
- Teachers: 580
- Staff: 610
- District mascot: Colonials
- Colors: Green and White

Other information
- Website: www.wfsd.k12.ny.us

The William Floyd Union Free School District is located in the southern area of the Town of Brookhaven on the South Shore of Long Island in Suffolk County, New York. The district serves all of Mastic Beach, the majority of Shirley, Mastic, and Moriches, and a small portion of Manorville. The Poospatuck Reservation is also within the district's zoning. The William Floyd School District is one of the largest school districts on Long Island and is named after William Floyd, one of only 56 men to sign the Declaration of Independence. The district is located on the south shore of Long Island, approximately 60 miles east of New York City, with an enrollment of 8,653 students as of 2016. William Floyd students attend five elementary schools, two middle schools, and a senior high school.

== Board of education ==
William Floyd, as a union free school district, is governed by a board of education. There are seven members on the board:

- April Coppola, board president, Elected 2016
- Lorraine Mentz, board member, Elected 2018
- Angelo Cassarino, board member, Elected 2020
- Jennifer Heitman, board member, Elected 2021
- Kevin Meyer, board member, Elected 2022
- Luis J. Soto, board member, Elected 2023
- Joseph Barone, board member, Elected 2026

== Primary schools ==
There are five primary schools which serve grades K-5:

- John S. Hobart Elementary School- Principal, James Westcott. As of 2016, there are 795 students in attendance. 54.6% of all students are male. 41.5% of the students are white, 28.3% are Hispanic or Latino and 19.7% identify as black or African-American. The school is named in honor of New York State politician and federal jurist John Sloss Hobart.
- Moriches Elementary - Principal, Deirdre Redding. As of 2016 are 885 students. 50.2% of all students are female. 44.9% are white, 33.7% are Hispanic or Latino, 14.5% are black and 2.9% identify as Asian.
- Tangier Smith Elementary School - Principal, Dominic Ciliotta. In the year 2016, there are 772 students. 53.5% are male. 53.9% of all students are white, 23.4% identify as Latino or Hispanic, 14.2% are black and 2.3% are Asian. Tangier Smith Elementary is named after early Long Island settler and former acting governor of New York William "Tangier" Smith.
- William Floyd Elementary School - Principal, Keith Fasciana. As of 2016, there are 755 students. 50.7% of all students are female. 54.2% are white, 28.9% are Latino or Hispanic, 7.9% are black and 4.1% identify as Asian.
- Nathaniel Woodhull Elementary School - Principal, Heather Murillo. According to data from 2016, there are 744 students. 50.4% are female. 51.9% are white, 30.4% are Hispanic or Latino, 10.2% are black and 3.2% are Asian. The school is named after Nathaniel Woodhull, who was a brigadier general in the New York Militia during the American Revolution.

== Middle schools ==
There are two middle schools which serve grades 6-8:

- William Floyd Middle School- Principal, Camelle Person. As of 2016, there are 1,047 students. 50.6% of the students are male. 53.5% of all students are white, 27.7% are Latino or Hispanic, 13.4% are black and 3.7% are Asian
- William Paca Middle School- Principal, Dr Michele Gode. There are 996 students in attendance, 51.6% of which are male. 60.5% of students are white, 17.9% are Latino or Hispanic, 16.6% are African- American or black and 1.7% identify as Asian according to 2016 records. This middle school is named in honor of former Maryland governor and Declaration of Independence signer William Paca.

== William Floyd High School ==
William Floyd High School is the high school in the district and serves grades 9–12. Principal, Phil Scotto took office in 2016, replacing former principal Barbara Butler. In 2016, there were 2,719 students. 50.5% and 49.5% of all students identify as male and female, respectively. 57.6% of students are white, 22.3% are Latino or Hispanic, 15.2% are black and 2.7% are Asian. The average class size is between 25 and 26 students.

=== Academics ===
As of the 2012–13 school year, William Floyd High School has a graduation rate of 80%. 92% of students graduate with the Regents Diploma and 36% of students graduate with a Regents Diploma with Advanced Designation.

As a public school, students in the district are expected to take a series of State Required standardized tests. All students in the third grade through the eighth grade take the English Language Arts (ELA) exams; In 2014 each respective grade received a mean score of slightly under 300. Third through eighth-grade students also take the New York State Testing Program Assessment in Mathematics, in 2014 each grade earned an average score between 254 and 300, with the exception of fifth grade, which received a score of 303 in 2014.

In New York State, middle school and high school students are expected to pass their Regents Exams with a 65 or higher in order to graduate and receive the Regents Diploma. In the English Comprehensive test taken in 2014, 80% of students passed and 85% of students passed the general education exams for the Regents that same year. In Mathematics, 58% of students passed the Integrated Algebra Regents, 52% passed the Geometry Regents, 67% passed the Algebra 2/ Trigonometry Regents.

Over the course of several years, the school district has infused Common Core into their curriculum. Whether or not a student is in a Common Core class or must take a Common Core standardized test mostly depends on which exam it is and the student's grade level. Students may even be required to take both the Common Core and the original version of an exam. The reason for this is because the integration is not yet completed. A NewsDay survey found that 40% of students in the William Floyd School District have opted out of the English and Mathematics common core exams.

The William Floyd School District made both national and international headlines when William Floyd High School student, Kwasi Enin, was accepted to all eight Ivy League institutions in the spring of 2014.

=== Sports ===
Two-time winner (2009 and 2016) of the SBPLI Long Island Regional Robotics Competition at Hofstra University. As a result of those victories they qualified for the National competitions and competed against teams from all around the country and world.

In 2014 The William Floyd Varsity Girls Tennis Team won the Suffolk County Championship and was ranked number one on Long Island The William Floyd Girls Varsity Lacrosse Team that has been in playoffs for the past six years and in 2010 became Super six Champions.

The William Floyd Youth Lacrosse Program had its first undefeated team in 2013, with the 5th grade team winning by an average of 7 goals a game.

The Colonials varsity football team has won 15 Suffolk County Championships occurring in 2001, 2003, 2005, 2006, 2007, 2009, 2010, 2011, 2012, 2016, 2018, 2019, 2023, 2024 . They are also five-time Long Island Champions - 2005, 2006, 2007, 2011 and 2012.

The 1991 William Floyd High School Softball team won the Suffolk County and Long Island Championship and finished 3rd overall in the New York State Championships.

The 1990 William Floyd Softball Team nearly missed the Long Island Championship, having lost in the Suffolk County Class A Finals to Sachem High School, who, at the time, was New York States only AA School. The team finished as League I Champions three consecutive seasons, in unusual fashion, having three sets of headline making sisters lead the team through most of that era—four of which achieved All New York State Honors and two All-Suburban (NY, NJ, CT) Honorees.

The 1990 and 1989 William Floyd Field Hockey Teams were League I Champions.

The 1962 William Floyd Varsity Baseball Team won the Suffolk County Class B Championship.

=== Music ===
Traditionally, all major ensembles at William Floyd receive the highest yearly ratings in the New York State School Music Association Solo, Ensemble and Major Organization Festivals. Outstanding student musicians may be recommended for Suffolk County Music Educators’ Association Festival participation during grades 5-10 and New York State Council of Administration in Music Education High School Festival in Grades 11 and 12. The William Floyd School District is nationally recognized for its fantastic music program.

In addition, William Floyd High School offers piano courses, as well as music theory, and music in our lives. There is also Modern Music Masters or Tri-M. Students involved in at least one performing group that achieve high grades in all classes are involved.

The music curricula for the district begin with Music Learning Theory applications in Grades 1 through 6. Classroom music, as well as string, wind, percussion and vocal performance groups, beginning in grade 6. In Grades 7 through 12, students enrolled in performing groups are encouraged to participate in state and county evaluation festivals both as soloists and in major ensembles.

== Notable alumni ==
- Frank Coraci – screenwriter and film director (The Wedding Singer, The Waterboy, Click)
- Lee Zeldin - current Administrator of the Environmental Protection Agency, former member of the House of Representatives, former Army officer

== See also ==
- William Floyd
- John Sloss Hobart
- William Paca
- William "Tangier" Smith
- Nathaniel Woodhull
