= Stefanie DeLeo =

American author and playwright

Stefanie LeAnn DeLeo
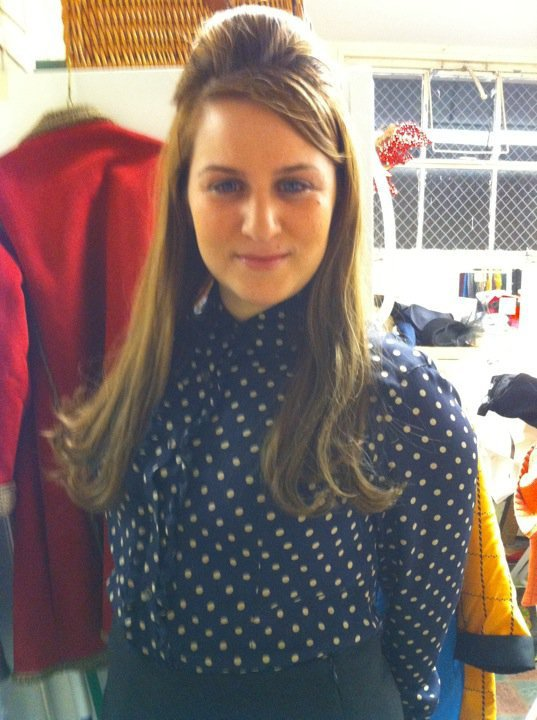
- DeLeo backstage in her 1960s costume for Curtain Call's 2011 production of Noel Coward's Waiting in the Wings
- Born: April 22, 1982 (age 44); Portsmouth, Virginia, U.S.
- Occupations: Author, Playwright, Actress, Director, Teacher
- Known for: Worth a Thousand Words, Chicken Soup for the Soul, Answer the Question, Iris, Jezebel's Apple
- Spouse: Fred Hudson Christian IV

Stefanie DeLeo (born April 22, 1982) is an American author and playwright known primarily for her published play on autism, Worth a Thousand Words published in 2010 through JAC NEED Publishers. In September 2017, she was published in the newest Chicken Soup for the Soul: Dreams and the Unexplainable edition. She is also the playwright of the comedic play Answer the Question, Iris and a contributing author to an SAT Prep book. Additionally, she has been a guest blogger on Melibee Global, reflecting on her time abroad. Stefanie was also a returned Peace Corps Volunteer having lived and worked in South African town of Kuruman for two and a half years, where she is listed as a notable resident.

== Early life ==
Stefanie was born in Portsmouth, Virginia at the Naval Medical Center. Because her father was in the Navy, she moved around a lot, living in four states by age 3. Her parents were both born and raised in New York City, which is where she spent the majority of her life.

Stefanie finds inspiration from George Orwell, Anne Frank, Tülay Günal and in 1993 after watching the Nickelodeon sketch comedy show, Roundhouse, she became addicted to the stage. Stefanie's childhood icon, Jennifer Cihi who starred in Roundhouse, was who Stefanie credits as the reason she wanted to one day become an actress and author. In a 1994 fan letter (written when DeLeo was just 11 years old) she promised to dedicate her first book to Jennifer, which she did in fact do.

DeLeo graduated from Ronkonkoma Junior High School in 1997 (now Ronkonkoma Middle School) and Connetquot High School in 2000. A large mural of Long Island that DeLeo painted is still displayed in the school's lobby. DeLeo attended a local church in Central Islip, which gave her many performance opportunities.

== Education and career ==
Stefanie attended undergrad at Eastern Nazarene College in Boston, receiving a Bachelor of Arts Degree in Theatre and Minoring in History. She starred in several productions including Lisa Loomer's Bocon and Thornton Wilder's The Skin of Our Teeth. Additionally, DeLeo studied playwriting and directing, and in 2004 she directed the main stage production of The Diary of Anne Frank which won the Moss Hart Award in 2004 for best play of the 2003-2004 theatre season. In 2005, DeLeo's first play Worth a Thousand Words was produced in Port Jefferson, New York at Theatre Three. That same play was later published. In 2005 she moved to New York City to pursue a master's degree in Educational Theatre at New York University. DeLeo earned her Master's in 2006. Her second play, Jezebel's Apple was performed at the Bowery Ballroom in Manhattan.

In 2006, Stefanie wrote her novel, Cry My Safari.

In 2007, DeLeo joined the Peace Corps and relocated to South Africa. She was stationed in the small, remote farming town of Kuruman in the Northern Cape. While there, DeLeo founded an interracial theatre group with a township school that performed original pieces all over the Northern Cape. She taught primary school and learned to speak Afrikaans as well as basic greetings in seTswana.

After the Peace Corps, DeLeo settled in Stamford, Connecticut, where she taught middle school history and drama. While in Connecticut, DeLeo appeared in several productions at Curtain Call, Westport Theatre and her short poem, The Pied Piper was performed as part of Bridgeport Theatre Company's After Bedtime Stories. Her poem was a tongue-in-cheek twist on the classic poem, where it served as an allegory to the Holocaust.

In 2012, her play, Answer the Question, Iris receives its first of many productions throughout the US.

In 2014, DeLeo relocated to Nashville, Tennessee. While in Nashville, she was cast in the show Alien at The Arts at Center Street DeLeo began teaching high school English, where she is teaching students about her own passion of writing and performing.

DeLeo was also an invited author to appear at Malta Comics Expo, one of Europe's biggest Comic Cons in October 2014 where friend, Jennifer Cihi, also appeared as a guest singer. On January 13 and 14, 2018, Stefanie DeLeo became the 1st accomplished writer invited to be a guest at The Asian Karaoke Idol Invitational's TAKII 24 ~The Power Of Love~ held at The Rotunda. DeLeo has since appeared in dozens of anime and comic conventions all over the US, Canada and Europe.

In 2017, DeLeo was published in Chicken Soup for the Soul. Chicken Soup for the Soul: Dreams and the Unexplainable -

In 2017, she appeared as an airport patron and MIT student in episode 119 of the new MacGyver television show.

DeLeo has traveled extensively throughout the world and uses these experiences to enhance her writing.

== Written works ==
Worth a Thousand Words - Worth a Thousand Words is the story of a newly widowed mother struggling to connect with her autistic daughter. Shortly after her husband's death, she learns that he has won an art competition. She solicits her daughter's help, since her daughter shared his passion for art. As the play unfolds we discover that her autistic daughter uses art as a means of communication and that is the only way in which her mother can learn to connect with her. At the end of the play, it is discovered that the winning painting belongs to her daughter and not her late husband.

Answer the Question, Iris - In this comedic play, Iris has a very unusual visit with a psychologist.

Chicken Soup for the Soul: Dreams and the Unexplainable - Stefanie's story of how she befriended the voice of Sailor Moon, and co-founded a project dedicated to providing support for people affected by mental illness.
