= William M. Davis =

William M. Davis may refer to:

- William Morris Davis (1850–1934), American geographer, geologist and meteorologist
- William Morris Davis (congressman) (1815–1891), U.S. representative from Pennsylvania
- William Moore Davis (1829–1920), American painter

== See also ==
- William Davis (disambiguation)
