= Belle Terre, New York =

- Village
- Incorporated Village of Belle Terre
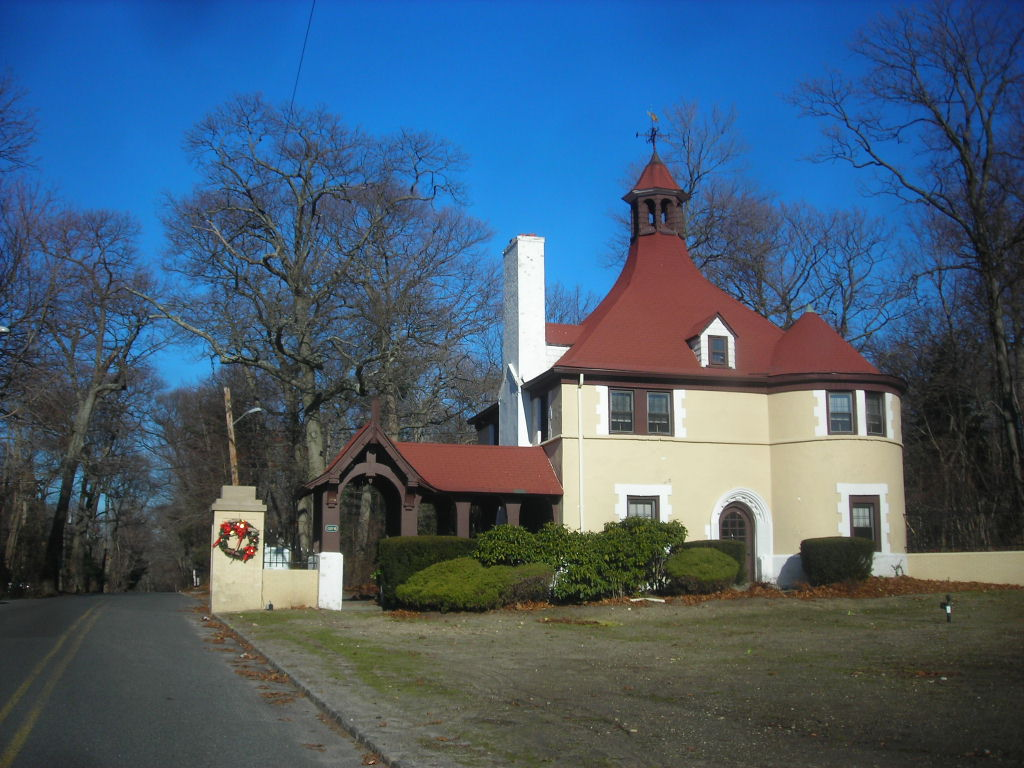
- The Belle Terre Gatehouse – a beaux arts structure dating to the first decade of the 1900s.

- Seal

- Location in Suffolk County and the state of New York

- Location on Long Island Location within the state of New York
- Coordinates: 40°57′37″N 73°4′5″W
- Country: United States
- State: New York
- County: Suffolk
- Town: Brookhaven
- Incorporated: 1931

Government
  - Mayor: Bob Sandak
  - Deputy Mayor: Jacquelyn Gernaey

Area
  - Total: 0.88 sq mi (2.29 km^{2})
  - Land: 0.88 sq mi (2.29 km^{2})
  - Water: 0 sq mi (0.00 km^{2})
- Elevation: 161 ft (49 m)

Population (2020)
  - Total: 808
  - Density: 913.2/sq mi (352.58/km^{2})
- Time zone: UTC−5 (Eastern (EST))
  - Summer (DST): UTC−4 (EDT)
- ZIP Code: 11777
- Area codes: 631, 934
- FIPS code: 36-05672
- GNIS feature ID: 0943606
- Website: www.belleterre.us

Belle Terre (bel-TAIR) is a village in the Town of Brookhaven in Suffolk County, on the North Shore of Long Island, in New York, United States. The population was 808 at the time of the 2020 census.

== History ==
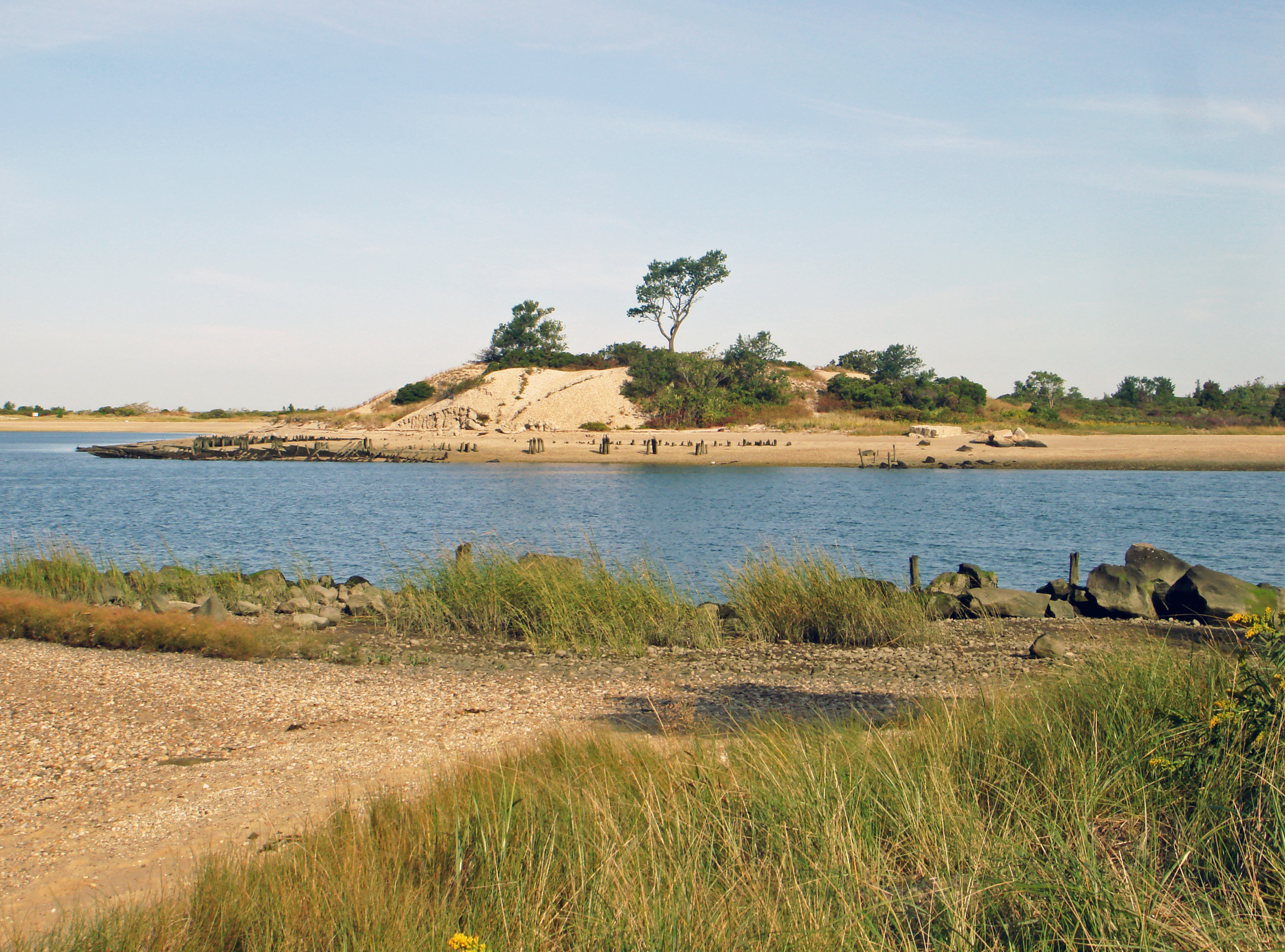
View of Mount Misery Point, in northern Belle Terre

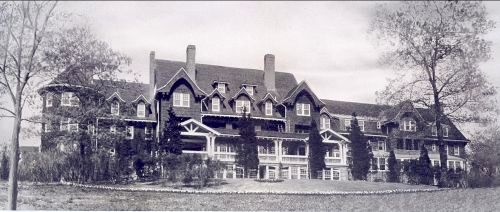
The Belle Terre Club, an opulent private clubhouse that stood from 1906 to 1934

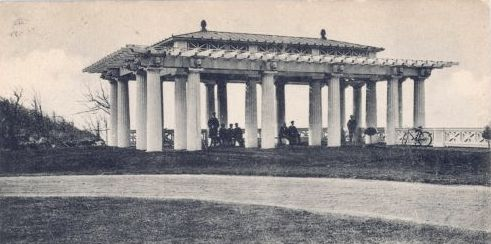
One of the pergolas that overlooked Port Jefferson Harbor prior to being dismantled in 1934

The peninsula on which the community of Belle Terre is situated has been known as Mt. Misery since the 17th century. Before Belle Terre's modern existence, the area was referred to as Mt. Misery Point. By comparison, the lower portion of the peninsula, which is currently a section of the neighboring village of Port Jefferson, was referred to as Mt. Misery Neck.

Throughout the 1700s and 1800s, the bulk of the peninsula was owned by the Strong family, who had their Oakwood estate in its Mt. Misery Neck section. The first known dwelling in contemporary Belle Terre was a shack constructed by an African-American affectionately known as Uncle Mott in the 1800s. This house was the subject of a painting by local artist William Moore Davis.

In 1902, the Port Jefferson Company purchased the Oakwood estate with the purpose of creating an exclusive waterfront development of fifty houses to rival the communities of Long Island's traditional Gold Coast. The well-connected real-estate developer, Dean Alvord, was chosen as president of Belle Terre's estates, which was incorporated in 1906. The construction of the Belle Terre Club, a grandiose private members club at the center of the community, also occurred in 1906. A pair of stately pergolas were constructed as well, which overlook the waterfront.

In 1931, Belle Terre incorporated as a village, with its residents voting in favor of municipal incorporation.

The Belle Terre Club was destroyed in a fire in 1934, the same year as the pergolas were deconstructed due to the financial burden of their upkeep. Due to a lapse in insurance coverage, the clubhouse was never rebuilt – although a new country club opened in the Port Jefferson section of the Mt. Misery peninsula in 1956.

During the 1920s and 1930s, the community's residents staged a successful campaign against sand and gravel companies who began dredging operations in the area. Prior to these companies being ordered to cease operations in 1931, the Seaboard Sand & Gravel Company dredged a large cove near the tip of the peninsula. This is today known as Pirates Cove and is a popular feature of Port Jefferson Harbor among boaters.

For several decades prior to her death in 2014, Belle Terre was the principal home of Nadia de Navarro Farber, a Bulgarian-born countess (by her second of four marriages) who donated considerably to the John T. Mather Memorial Hospital in neighboring Port Jefferson. Farber alternated her residence between a landmark pink mansion near the tip of Belle Terre and her castle on the Caribbean island of Saint Croix. The pink mansion was featured prominently in the 1989 film She-Devil.

== Geography ==
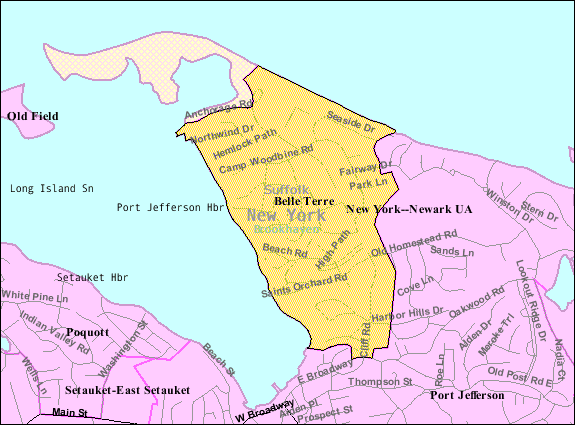
U.S. Census map

According to the United States Census Bureau, the village has a total area of 0.9 square miles (2.3 km^{2}), all land.

=== Location ===
The village occupies the northeastern half of the Mt. Misery Peninsula and overlooks both Port Jefferson Harbor and the Long Island Sound. All access to the village by way of land is from the neighboring village of Port Jefferson, which additionally serves as Belle Terre's nearest commercial center and transportation hub.

== Demographics ==
Historical population
| Census | Pop. | Note | %± |
|---|---|---|---|
| 1940 | 89 | | — |
| 1950 | 120 | | 34.8% |
| 1960 | 295 | | 145.8% |
| 1970 | 678 | | 129.8% |
| 1980 | 826 | | 21.8% |
| 1990 | 839 | | 1.6% |
| 2000 | 832 | | −0.8% |
| 2010 | 792 | | −4.8% |
| 2020 | 808 | | 2.0% |
U.S. Decennial Census

As of the census of 2010, there were 792 people, 286 households, and 224 families residing in the village. The racial makeup of the village was 92.6% White, 1.3% African American, 3.3% Asian, 1.3% from other races, and 1.5% from two or more races. Hispanic or Latino of any race were 3.9% of the population.

There were 286 households, out of which 30.8% had children under the age of 18 living with them, 72.0% were married couples living together, 2.1% had a male householder with no wife present, 4.2% had a female householder with no husband present, and 21.7% were non-families. 15.7% of all households were made up of individuals, and 9.4% had someone living alone who was 65 years of age or older. The average household size was 2.77 persons and the average family size was 3.10 persons.

As of the census of 2000, the population density was 952.3 inhabitants per square mile (367.7/km^{2}). There were 297 housing units at an average density of 339.9 per square mile (131.2/km^{2}).

In the village, the population was spread out, with 24.8% under the age of 18, 3.6% from 18 to 24, 21.9% from 25 to 44, 36.5% from 45 to 64, and 13.2% who were 65 years of age or older, and the median age for the village was 45 years. For every 100 females, there were 100.5 males and for every 100 females age 18 and over, there were 98.1 males.

The median income for a household in the village was $132,155, and the median income for a family was $144,708. Males had a median income of $100,000 versus $50,156 for females. The per capita income for the village was $56,191. None of the families and 1.4% of the population were living below the poverty threshold, including none under the age of 18 and 3.2% of those over the age of 64.

== Government ==
As of April 2025, the Mayor of Belle Terre is Bob Sandak, the Deputy Mayor is Jacquelyn Gernaey, and the Village Trustees are Leza Di Bella, Michael Solo, and Jim von Oiste.

== Village of Belle Terre v. Boraas ==
Belle Terre is known for a law that evicted students from a nearby university campus, the Stony Brook University, who were leasing shared housing in the village. In 1974, in the case Village of Belle Terre v. Boraas, the Supreme Court of the United States upheld the local ordinance. In the Court's opinion, written by Justice William O. Douglas held that it was constitutional to forbid more than two people unrelated by blood, adoption, or marriage — not counting household servants — from living and cooking together as a single housekeeping unit in the village for the purpose of maintaining a quiet residential sector.

== See also ==
- List of villages in New York (state)
- Port Jefferson, New York
