= Frank Norton =

American baseball player (1845–1920)

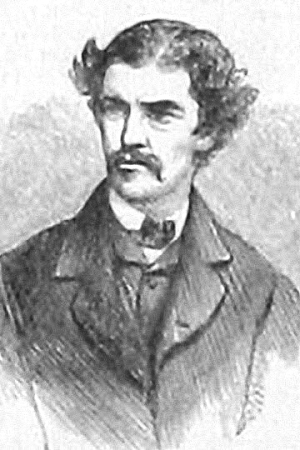
- Outfielder/Third baseman
- Born: June 9, 1845; Port Jefferson, New York, U.S.
- Died: August 1, 1920 (aged 75); Greenwich, Connecticut, U.S.
- Batted: Unknown Threw: Unknown

MLB debut
- May 5, 1871, for the Washington Olympics

Last MLB appearance
- May 5, 1871, for the Washington Olympics

MLB statistics
- Batting average: .000
- Home runs: 0
- Runs batted in: 0
- Stats at Baseball Reference

Teams
- National Association of Base Ball Players Brooklyn Stars (1863) Washington Nationals (1867–1869) Washington Olympics (1870) National Association of Professional BBP Washington Olympics 1871

Frank Prescott Norton (June 9, 1845 – August 1, 1920) was an American professional baseball player, who played in one game for the Washington Olympics on May 5, 1871. He struck out in his only at-bat and played third base and outfield in the game. He made an error at third, on his only recorded fielding chance.
