= Port Jefferson, New York =

- Village
- Incorporated Village of Port Jefferson
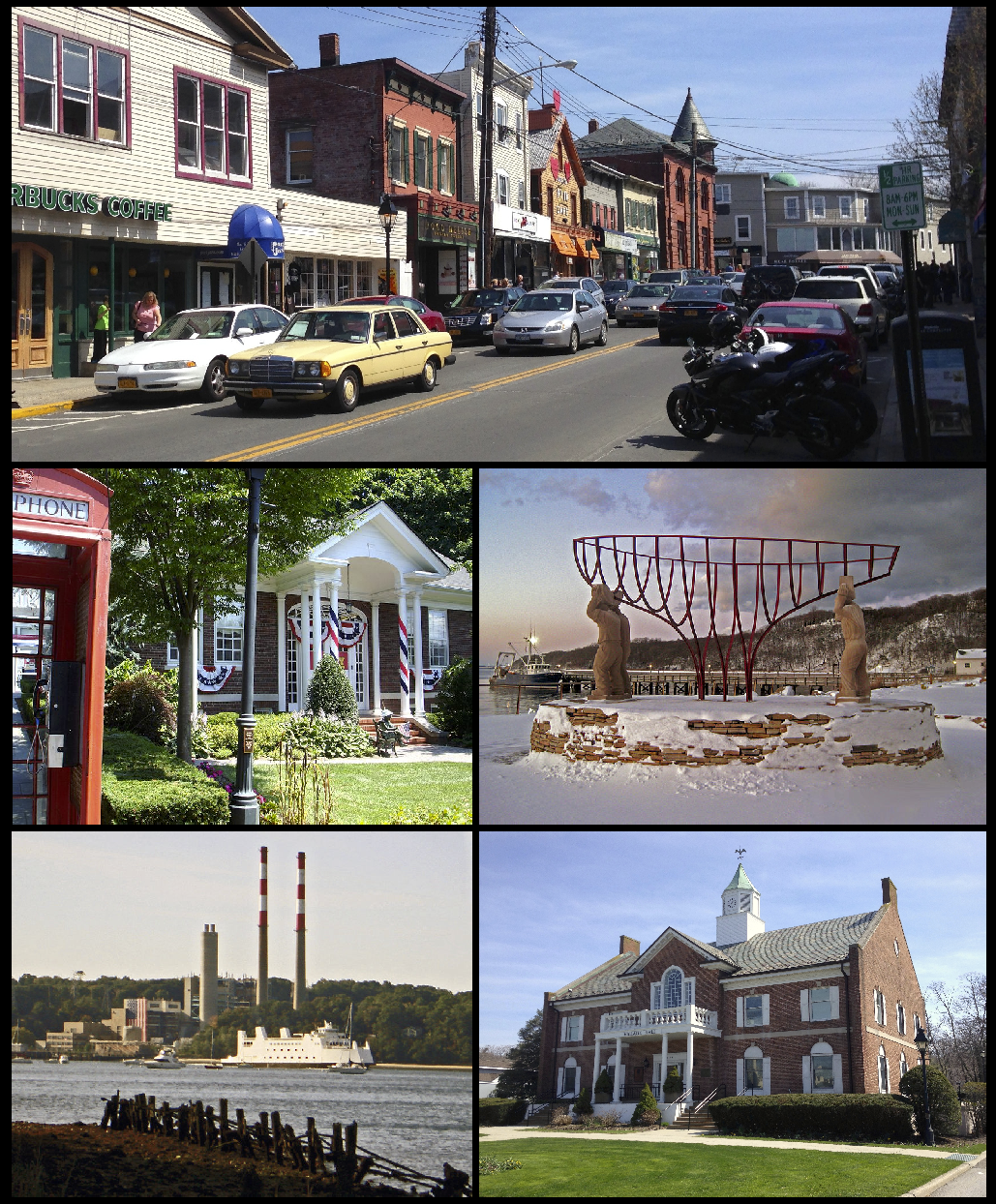
- Clockwise from top: a view of shops on Main Street, monument commemorating the village's maritime past, Port Jefferson Village Hall, A ferry passes a local power plant en route to Bridgeport, Connecticut, Port Jefferson Free Library

- Seal
- Nicknames: Port Jeff; Port; PJ
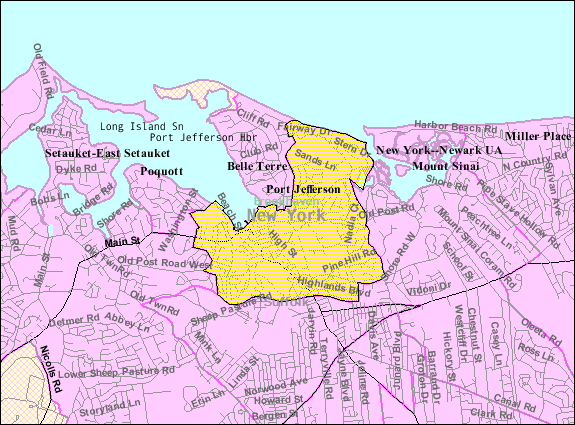
- U.S. Census Map

- Location on Long Island Location within the state of New York
- Coordinates: 40°56′46″N 73°3′44″W
- Country: United States
- State: New York
- County: Suffolk
- Town: Brookhaven
- Incorporated: 1963

Government
  - Type: Mayor-Council
  - Mayor: Lauren Sheprow

Area
  - Total: 3.09 sq mi (8.00 km^{2})
  - Land: 3.06 sq mi (7.93 km^{2})
  - Water: 0.027 sq mi (0.07 km^{2})
- Elevation: 12 ft (3.7 m)

Population (2020)
  - Total: 7,962
  - Density: 2,599.2/sq mi (1,003.55/km^{2})
- Time zone: UTC−05:00 (Eastern Time Zone)
  - Summer (DST): UTC−04:00
- ZIP Code: 11777
- Area codes: 631, 934
- FIPS code: 36-59355
- GNIS feature ID: 0960968
- Website: www.portjeffny.gov

Port Jefferson, sometimes shortened as Port Jeff, is an incorporated village in the town of Brookhaven in Suffolk County, on the North Shore of Long Island, in New York, United States. The population was 7,962 at the time of the 2020 census.

Port Jefferson was first settled in the 17th century and remained a rural community until its development as an active shipbuilding center in the mid-19th century. The village has since transitioned to a tourist-based economy. The community's port remains active as the terminus of the Bridgeport & Port Jefferson Ferry – one of two commercial ferry lines between Long Island and Connecticut – and is supplemented by the terminus of the Long Island Rail Road's Port Jefferson Branch. It is also the center of the Greater Port Jefferson region of northwestern Brookhaven, serving as the cultural, commercial and transportation hub of the neighboring Port Jefferson Station, Belle Terre, Mount Sinai, Miller Place, Poquott, and the Setaukets.

== History ==
=== Colonial and precolonial history ===
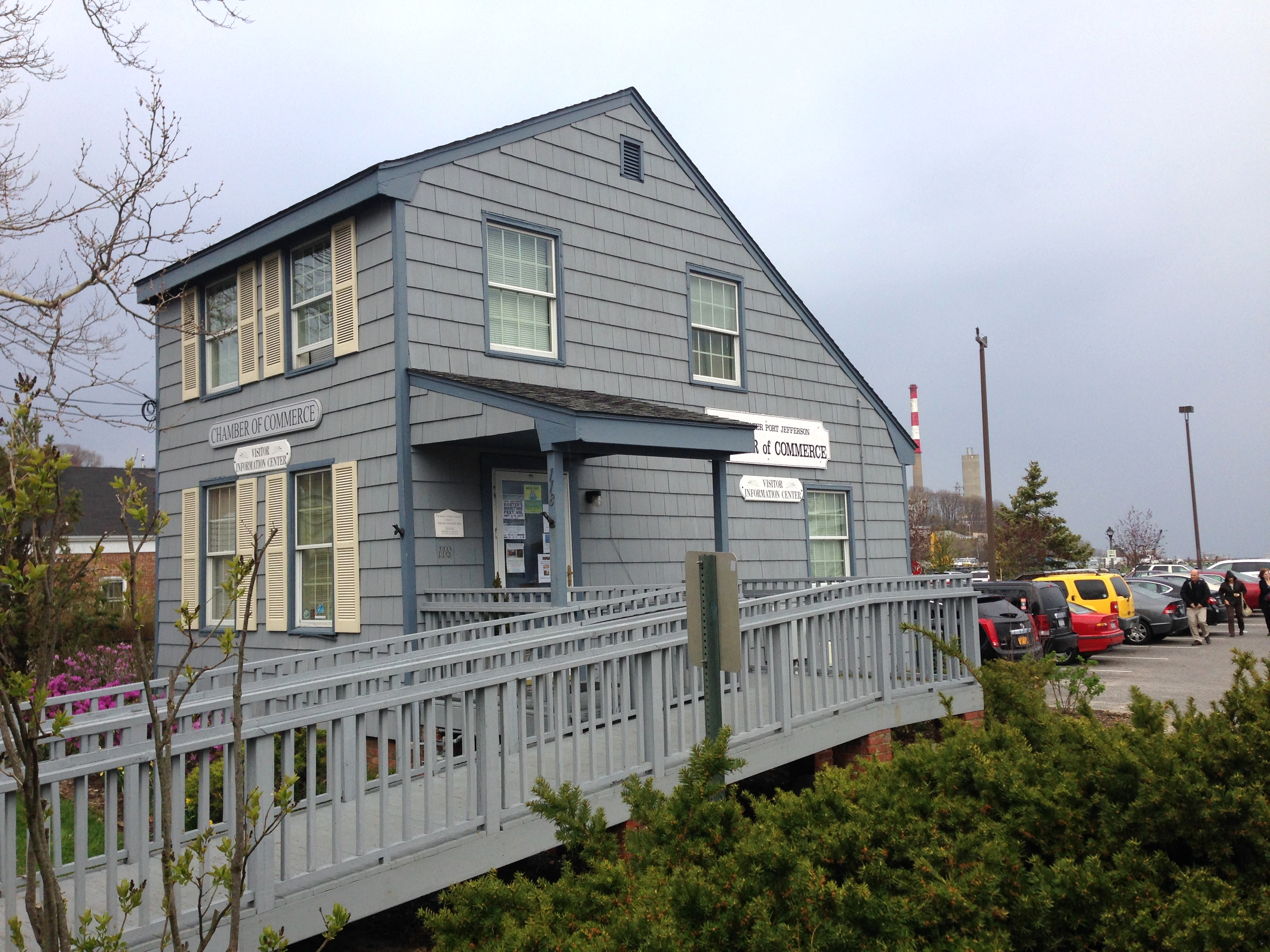
c.1682 home of John Roe, the first settler in lower Port Jefferson

The original settlers of the Town of Brookhaven, based in the neighboring hamlet of Setauket, bought a tract of land from the Setalcott Indians in 1655. The deed included the area of contemporary Port Jefferson along with all other lands along the North Shore from the Nissequogue River eastward to Mount Misery Point.

Port Jefferson's original name was Sowaysset, a Native American term for either "place of small pines" or "where water opens".

The first known home within the present village boundaries was erected in the early 1660s by Captain John Scott, an important leader in Long Island's early history. This house, named Egerton, was a grand abode on the western end of Mount Sinai Harbor at Mount Misery Neck. The first settler in Port Jefferson's current downtown was an Irish Protestant shoemaker from Queens named John Roe, who built his still-standing home in 1682. It remained a small community of five homes through the 18th century, and was renamed to "Drowned Meadow" in 1682.

Local lore has it that the pirate Captain Kidd rendezvoused in the harbor on his way to bury treasure at Gardiners Island. Another legend is that: during the Revolutionary War, naval commander John Paul Jones had a ship fitted here. However, there is no factual support for these assertions, and the historical works quoted do not present them as definitive facts. John Paul Jones's career in particular is well documented, and there are no accounts of him visiting the village, which was under British control during the time he served as a commanding officer.

=== Development as a shipbuilding village ===
In 1797, when the entire town had five houses, its first shipyard was built. By 1825, several shipbuilding firms were located there, which attracted new residents and commerce.

During the War of 1812, British interference on Long Island Sound upset local shipping routes. On one occasion, two British warships, the frigate HMS Pomone and brig HMS Despatch sent their boats into the harbor under cover of darkness, capturing seven sloops. To protect local interests, a small fortress was set up on the west side of Port Jefferson Harbor.

In 1836 the local leadership initiated the community's transition from a "swampish hamlet" to a busy port town. The 22 acres of the harborfront, which flooded at high tide, were brought to a stable elevation with the construction of a causeway. The village changed its name from "Drowned Meadow" to "Port Jefferson", in honor of Thomas Jefferson.

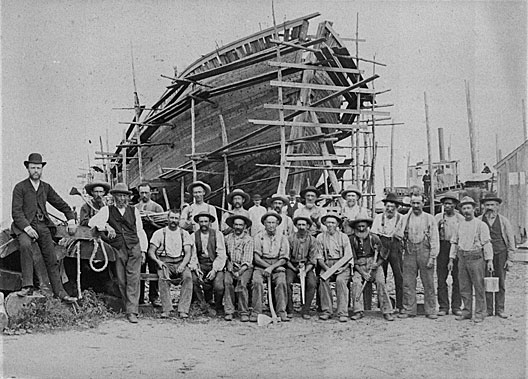
Mather Shipyard in 1884

Numerous shipyards developed along Port Jefferson's harbor, and the village's shipbuilding industry became the largest in Suffolk County. Two whaling vessels were built for New Bedford at Port Jefferson in 1877 (ship Horatio and bark Fleetwing), and a Port Jefferson-built schooner (La Ninfa) was later converted into a whaling vessel at San Francisco. Port Jefferson's primary role as a port in the 19th century was to build and support vessels engaged in the coastal freighting trades. Many of Port Jefferson's remaining homes from this period were owned by shipbuilders and captains. This includes the Mather House Museum, a mid-19th century home once owned by the Mather shipbuilding family that now serves as the center of a museum complex and headquarters for the Historical Society of Greater Port Jefferson.

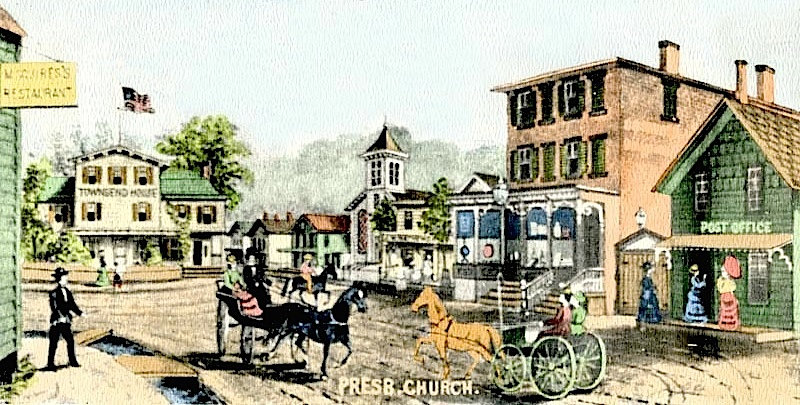
Postcard of Hotel Square, corner of Main and East Main, with labels displaying the Townsend House hotel and the village's first post office in the late 19th century

P. T. Barnum, the famous circus owner, owned a tract of land which ran through the village. His intention was to make Port Jefferson the home base for his circus, founded in 1871. The residents blocked his plans, and he eventually sold his land. Barnum Avenue now runs through the area that was once Barnum's.

The section of town at the intersection of the two streets, then known as Hotel Square, became an active center of Port Jefferson's early tourism industry in the mid-19th century, with a variety of hotels and restaurants. This included the John Roe house, which was converted into the Townsend House hotel. The village's first post office was added to this intersection in 1855.

With the 1923 sale of the Bayles Shipyard to the Standard Oil Company and demolition of all but two of its structures, Port Jefferson's shipbuilding industry came to a close. This resulted in an economic downturn, and the closing of many of the grand hotels in Hotel Square, as tourism declined along with the industry. Port Jefferson Harbor then became a depot for the oil transportation and gravel industries, and, since the 1940s, the site of a Long Island Lighting Company coal-fired power plant. The harbor also had activity as a rum-running center during the Prohibition era. Decades later, Port Jefferson's economy had recovered, with tourism as its base.

=== Village of Port Jefferson (1963–present) ===
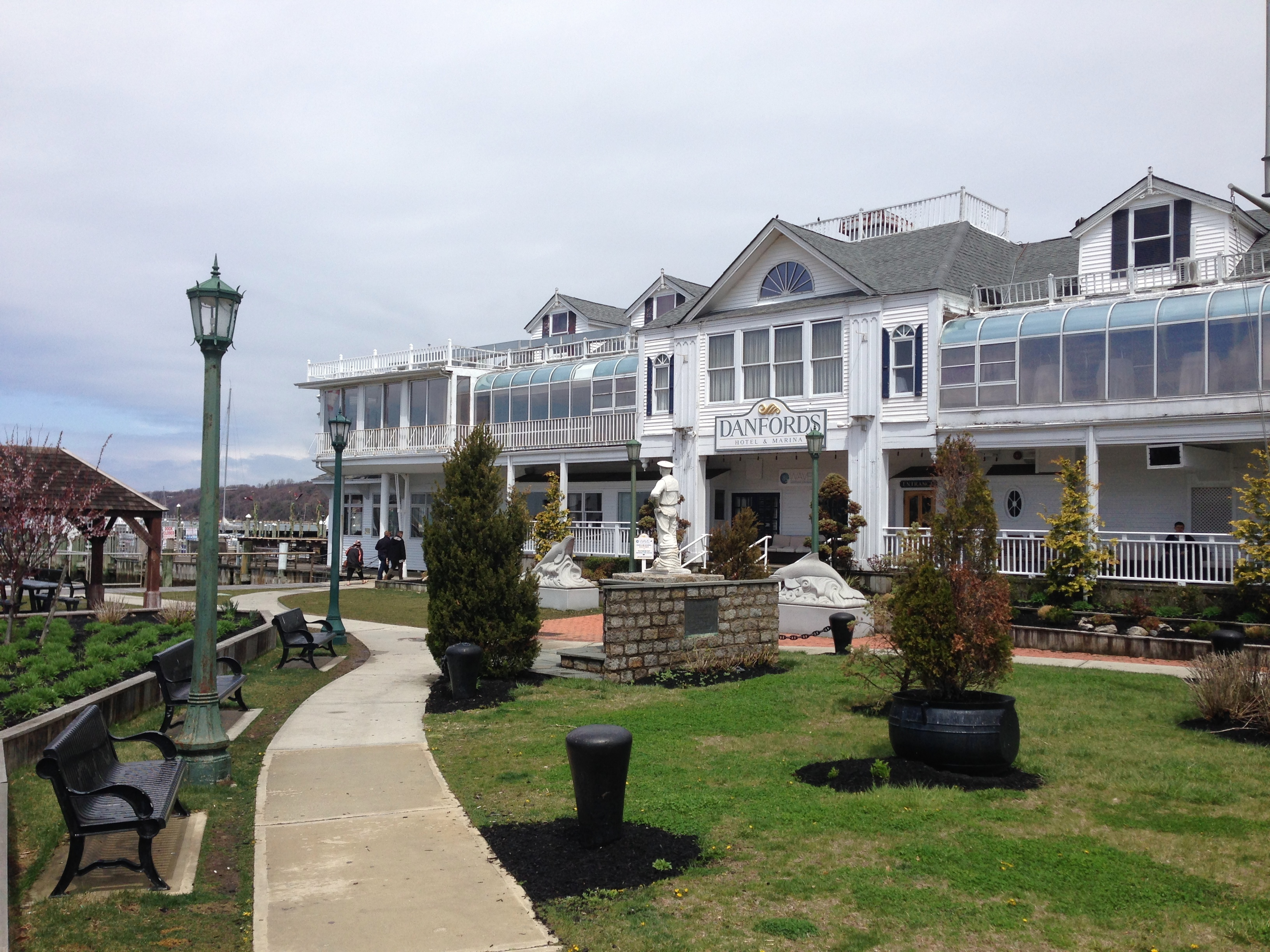
Danfords Hotel & Marina

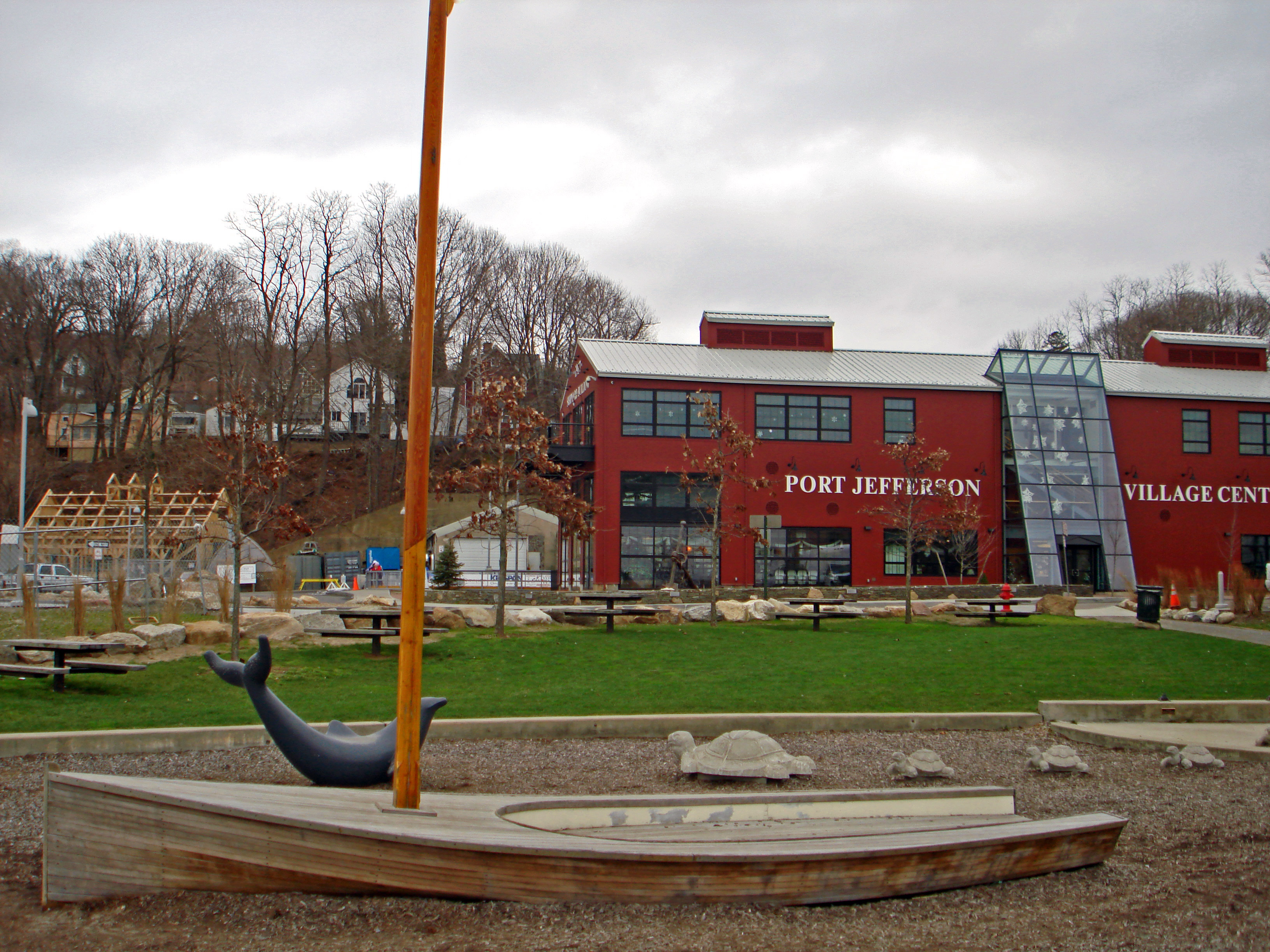
Port Jefferson Village Center, during the last phase of Harborfront Park's construction

The village of Port Jefferson was incorporated in 1963. The revitalization of lower Port Jefferson soon followed as local tourism brought increased revenues and the village adjusted itself to its new economic role. One such transformation was the 1976 redevelopment of the defunct Mather & Jones Shipyard into a shop-lined promenade known as Chandler Square.

A result of the transition is new public access to much of the waterfront, as several industrial lots had previously stood in the way. Danfords Hotel and Marina was one major waterfront project, which integrated several new and historical structures into a luxury hotel. Danfords includes a commercial marina and walkable pier, marking an aspect of the harbor's transformation from industrial to recreational use.

Harborfront Park, a project completed in 2004, similarly transitioned the site of a shipyard turned Mobil Oil terminal into a public park with picnic grounds, a seasonal ice skating rink and a promenade. Concurrent to the park's construction was the rebuilding of a former shipyard warehouse into the Port Jefferson Village Center, a new public space for events and recreation.

A number of historic buildings were included in the Port Jefferson Village Historic District, listed on the National Register of Historic Places in 2005. Separately listed are the Bayles Shipyard and First National Bank of Port Jefferson building.

== Geography ==
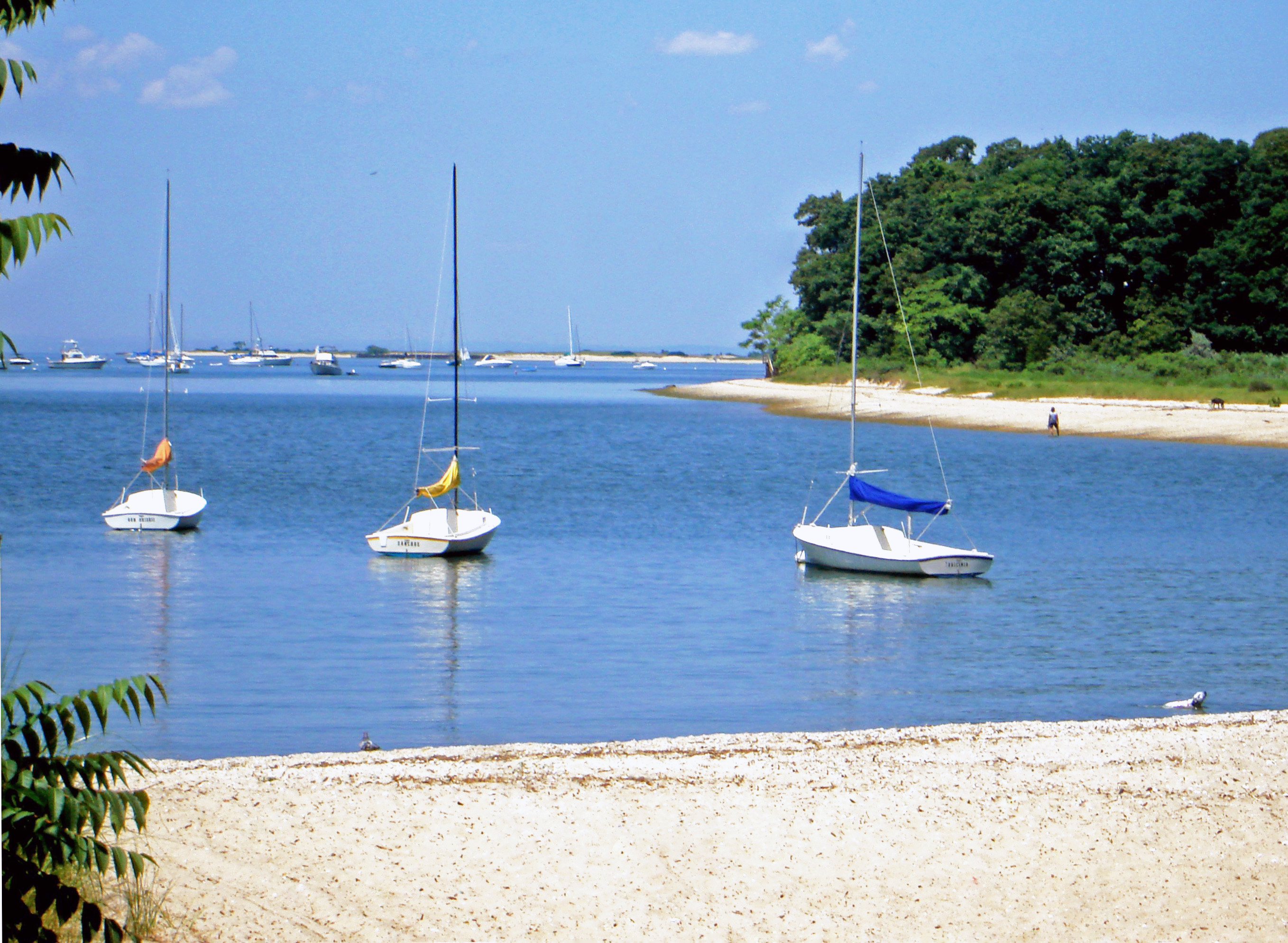
Boats in Port Jefferson Harbor

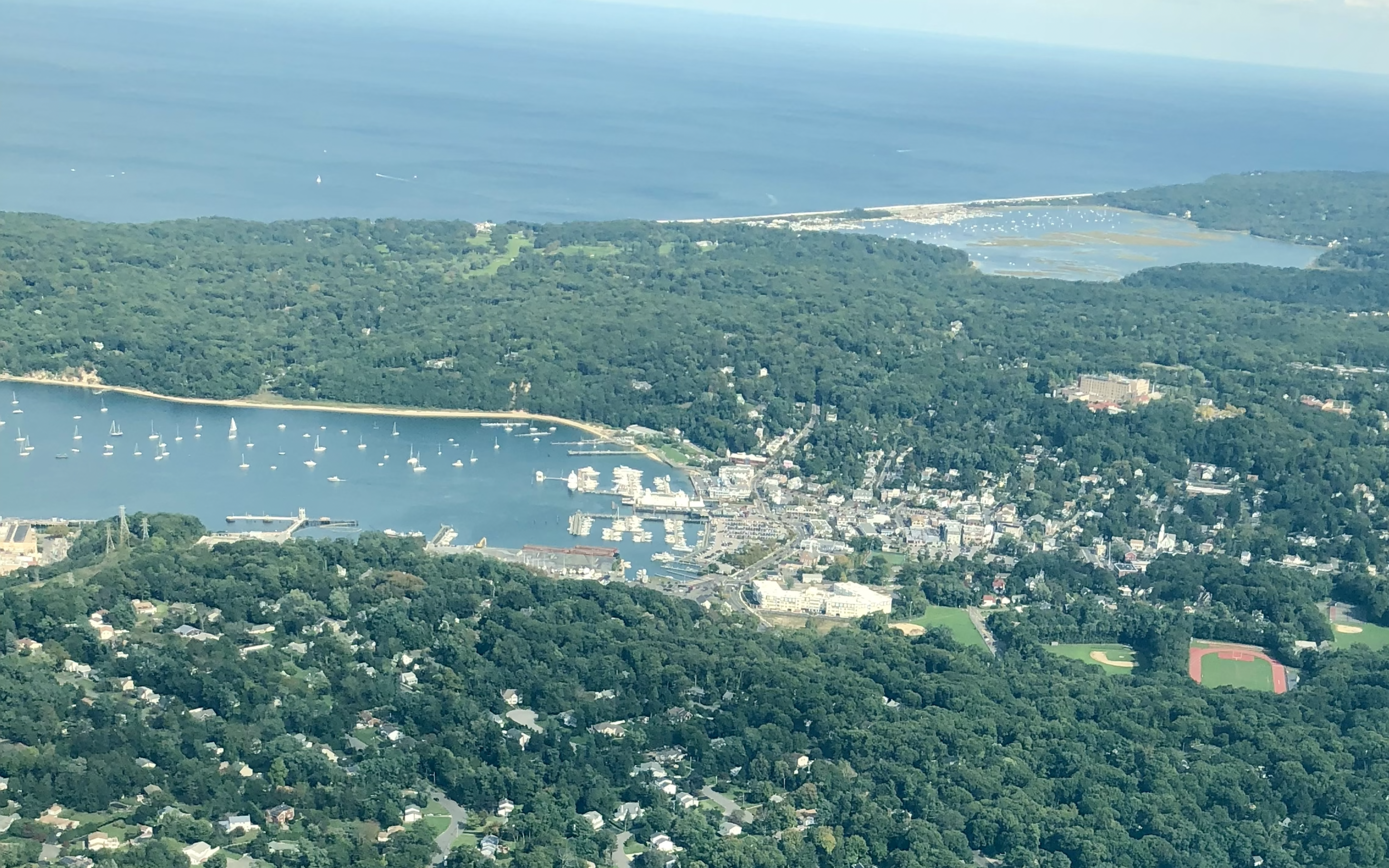
An aerial view of Port Jefferson in 2018

The village's commerce is divided into two centers that lie 1-mile (1.6 km) apart along Main Street and at differing elevations. These are known as Lower Port Jefferson and Upper Port Jefferson, respectively the waterfront and the railroad station sections of town. The first is currently the center of tourism, while the latter is undergoing plans for revitalization to the economic viability of its historic self. Further from Main Street, the remainder of Port Jefferson consists of several residential neighborhoods defined by the hills on which they sit. In the northeastern corner of the village is the neighborhood of Harbor Hills. This neighborhood occupies the western edge of Mount Sinai Harbor and contains the Port Jefferson Country Club at Harbor Hills. Brick Hill is the neighborhood directly west of the Lower Port Jefferson commercial center and was first developed by the noted circus owner P. T. Barnum. West of Upper Port Jefferson is Cedar Hill, which is topped by the c. 1859 Cedar Hill Cemetery where residents formerly would bask while enjoying views over the village from its highest point.

Within Port Jefferson is Port Jefferson Harbor, a natural deepwater harbor. Setauket Harbor branches off to the west from the harbor. One notable geographic feature is Pirate's Cove, a small cove dredged in the early 20th century by the Seaboard Dredging Company. The original name was Seaboard Hole, but it was changed for the sake of appealing to tourists, and several large sand dunes artificially created by the dredging can also be found here. The dunes, nearby coast, and surrounding wildlands are within the publicly-accessible McAllister County Park, with limited parking available on Anchorage Road. Foot traffic is welcome, bicycles are prohibited, and sections of the park are closed to visitors during nesting season for the endangered Piping Plover.

== Demographics ==
Historical population
Census	Pop.	Note	%±
1880	1,724		—
1890	2,026		17.5%
1970	5,515		—
1980	6,731		22.0%
1990	7,455		10.8%
2000	7,837		5.1%
2010	7,750		−1.1%
2020	7,962		2.7%
U.S. Decennial Census

As of the 2010 United States census, there were 7,750 people, 3,090 households, and 1,975 families residing in the village. The population density was approximately 2,500 people per square mile (980/km^{2}). The racial makeup of the village was 88.5% White, 10.5% Hispanic or Latino, 2.1% Asian, 1.6% African American, 0.2% Native American, 2.2% from other races, and 1.4% from two or more races.

There were 3,090 households, out of which 27.8% had children under the age of 18 living with them, 52.2% were married couples living together, 8.0% had a female householder with no husband present, 3.8% had a male household with no wife present, and 36.1% were non-families. Of all households, 28.3% were made up of individuals living alone, and 9.0% consisted of people living alone who were 65 years of age or older. The average household size was 2.40 and the average family size was 2.96.

The age breakdown consisted of 20.7% under the age of 18, 6.9% from 18 to 24, 24.2% from 25 to 44, 31.2% from 45 to 64, and 16.8% who were 65 years of age or older. The median age was 43.6 years. For every 100 females, there were 97.6 males. For every 100 females age 18 and over, there were 95.1 males.

In the 2008–2012 American Community Survey, the median income for a household in the village was $108,060 and the median income for a family was $138,984. The per capita income for the village was $51,937. Of the population, 6.5% were below the poverty threshold.

== Arts and culture ==
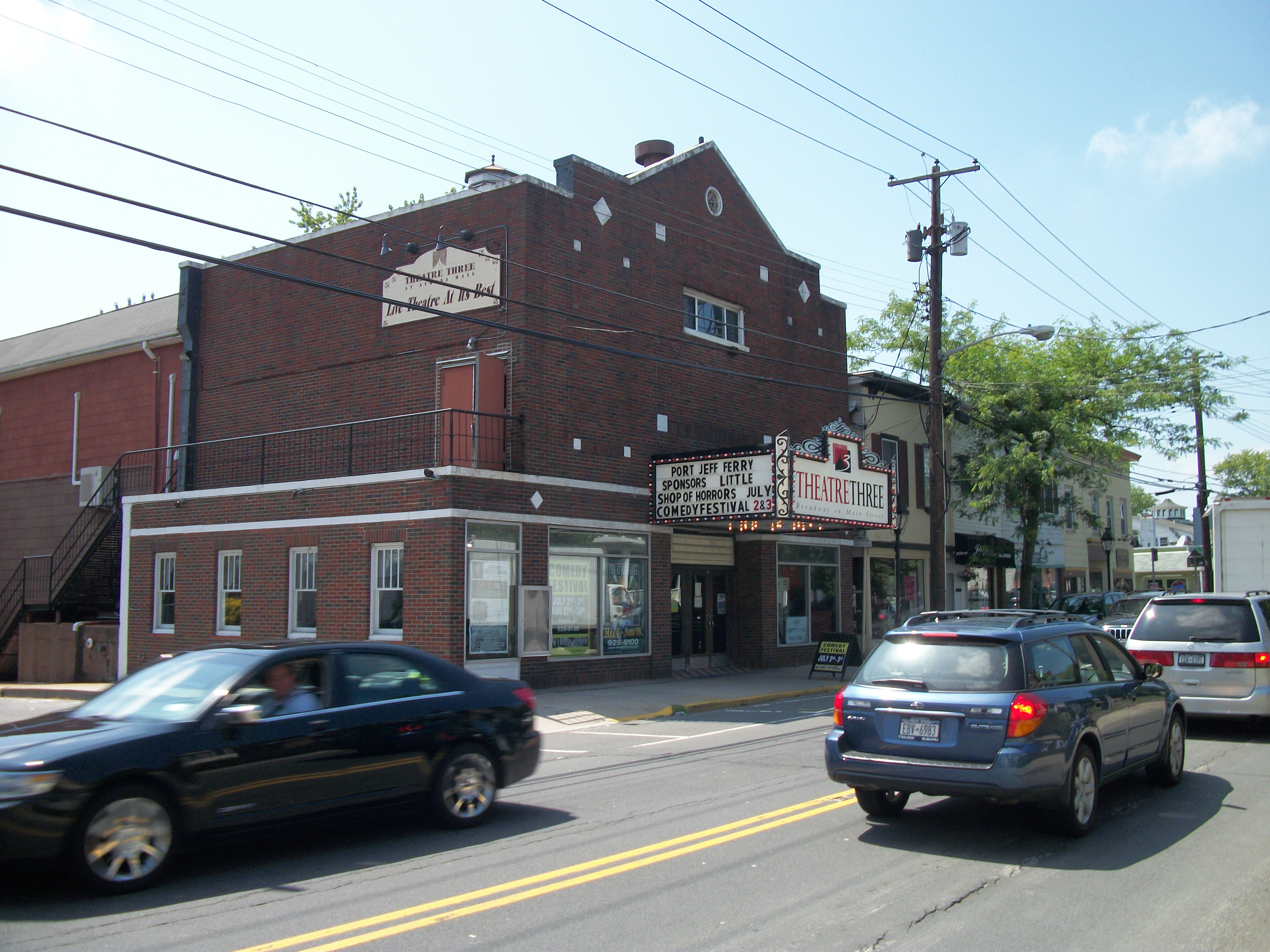
Theatre Three is based in the Athena Hall, built c. 1874

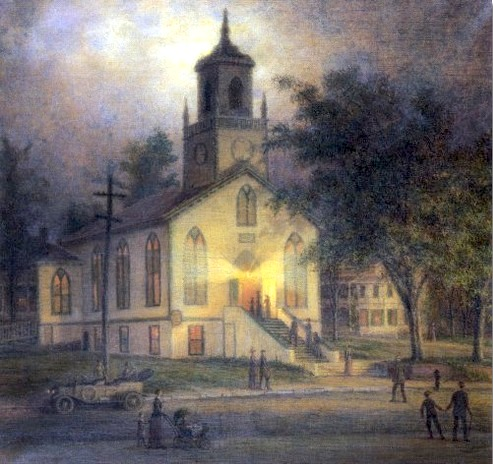
Lecture night at the Baptist Church, Port Jefferson, 1912 painting by William Moore Davis

Port Jefferson is home to Theatre Three, a non-profit theatre company founded in 1969. Each year Theatre Three stages four musicals and two plays and additionally performs A Christmas Carol during the annual Dickens Festival. Theatre Three is held in Athena Hall, a performance space dating to 1874. The village was home to two notable landscape painters in the late 19th century, William Moore Davis and Leon Foster Jones. Both artists produced numerous depictions of Port Jefferson and its harbor. They were the subject of a 1993 art exhibition by the Long Island Museum of American Art, History, and Carriages in Stony Brook. From 1924 until 1978, a small machine shop at the rear of the theatre, known as the Griswold Machine Works, manufactured the Griswold Film Splicer, standard equipment in motion picture projection rooms and also made in a smaller version used by home movie hobbyists to edit and repair 8mm and 16mm film.

=== Annual cultural events ===
Port Jefferson has been home to the annual Port Jefferson Village Dickens Festival every year since 1996. The festival celebrates the works and times of English novelist Charles Dickens. It takes place during a weekend early in December and typically includes many events and occurrences, such as the regular sighting of people who dress in 19th century clothing, house tours, the reading of winter-related poetry, caroling, and booths set up by local businesses. Students from the Port Jefferson Middle School and High School submit poetry and art that are used in the festival. Free concerts of seasonal music by various ensembles are presented at the Methodist church. Many small festivals are held during the summer, showcasing music and crafts. Each Fourth of July sees a substantial parade on Main Street. The village also hosts an annual outdoor concert series and film screenings, both of which currently take place in Harborfront Park throughout July and August. In keeping with its seafaring heritage, Port Jefferson hosts its own annual boat race series known as the Village Cup Regatta, with proceeds benefiting cancer research.

== Government ==
Port Jefferson is governed at the local level by a mayor, four trustees, and a village justice.

== Education ==
The Port Jefferson Union Free School District covers Belle Terre and most of Port Jefferson. In 2008, the district had 1375 students.

There are three schools:

- Edna Louise Spear Elementary School (Pre-K to 5th), also known as Port Jefferson Elementary School or Scraggy Hill School.
- Port Jefferson Middle School (6th to 8th)
- Earl L. Vandermeulen High School (9th to 12th), also known as Port Jefferson High School
- Port Jefferson Middle School and High School currently share the same building located on 350 Old Post Road. The Middle School (7th and 8th grade only) was previously located at 118 Spring Street. That building currently houses the Jefferson Academic Center, a vocational school operated by Eastern Suffolk BOCES.

Port Jefferson union free school district (UFSD) is bordered on the west by Three Village Central School District, on the south by Comsewogue School District, and on the east by Mount Sinai School District.

== Media ==
- Newsday (daily)
- The Port Times Record (weekly)

== Transportation ==
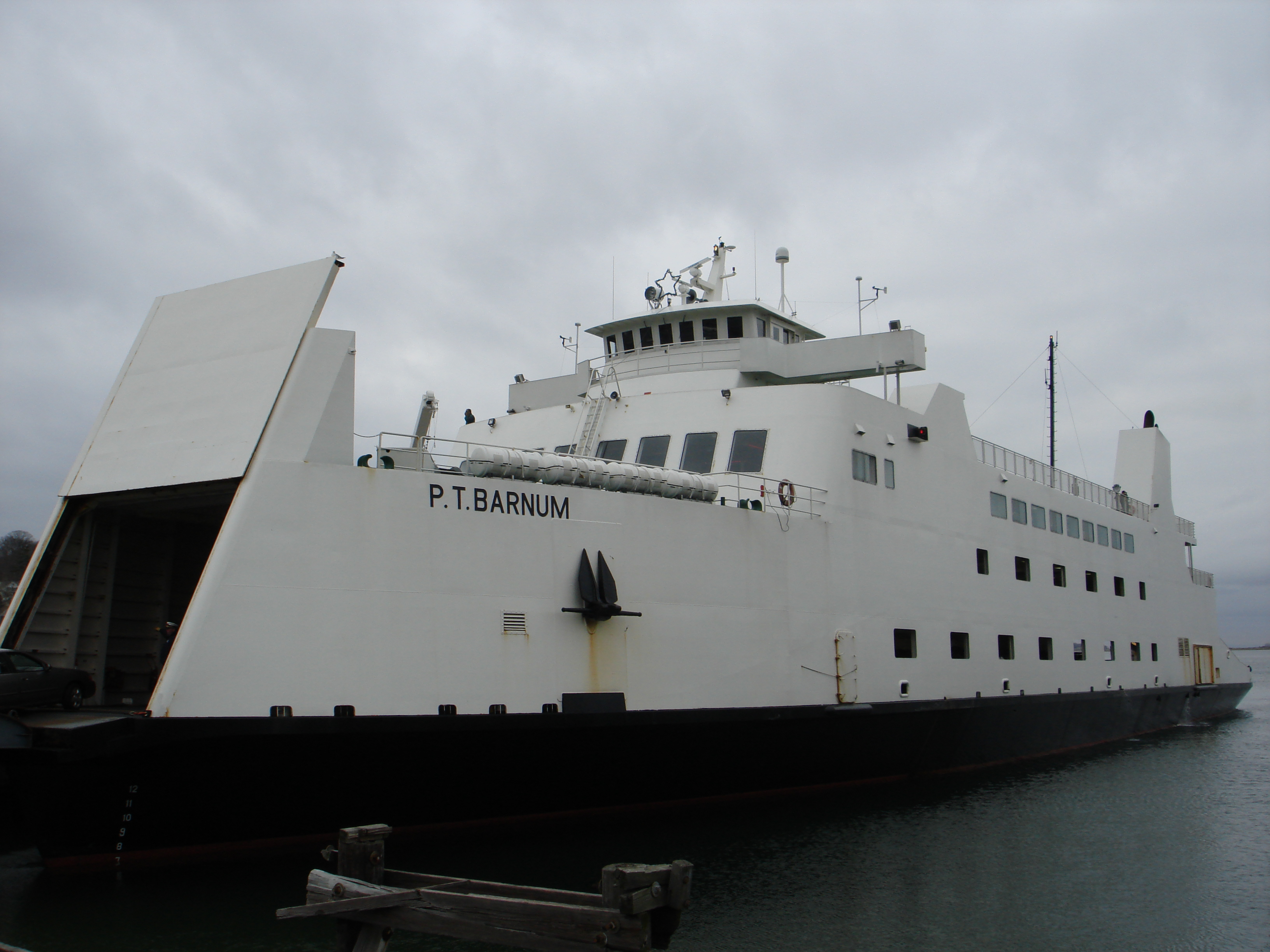
P. T. Barnum, one of the four ferries operated by the Bridgeport & Port Jefferson Ferry, named after the renowned circus master

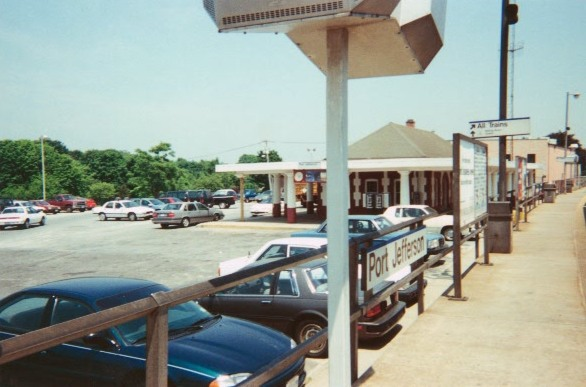
Port Jefferson train station on the Long Island Rail Road's Port Jefferson Branch opened in 1873

Port Jefferson features a major ferry route, a Long Island Rail Road terminus, multiple bus lines, and an extensive network of roads.

The Bridgeport & Port Jefferson Ferry is one of two routes connecting Long Island to New England. The other route is the Cross Sound Ferry at Orient Point and no bridges or tunnels exist despite past proposals. Port Jefferson's ferry company was established in 1883 and was championed by influential circus owner P. T. Barnum. Barnum, who owned lands in both Port Jefferson and Bridgeport, Connecticut, became the new company's first president.

The village additionally serves as the eastern terminus for the Long Island Rail Road's Port Jefferson Branch. The branch consists of a diesel train that connects to the electrified Main Line at Huntington station. During the full run it continues toward the western terminus of Pennsylvania Station in Manhattan or to Atlantic Terminal in Brooklyn. The average commute from Port Jefferson to Manhattan via the Long Island Rail Road takes approximately 2 hours. Train service to New York City first reached Port Jefferson in 1873. The ferry terminal and train station are approximately 1-mile (1.6 km) apart. In March 2014, mayor Margot Garant announced interest in establishing a future shuttle to link the two transportation networks as well as their respective sections of town, lower and upper Port Jefferson.

Suffolk County Transit operates a bus route, the 51, which runs from Patchogue station to Port Jefferson station via Ronkonkoma station, Smith Haven Mall, Stony Brook University, and Port Jefferson. It operates every 30 minutes on weekdays and hourly on weekends. Routes 53 and 55 operate between Port Jefferson station and Patchogue station via Farmingville, New York, and New York State Route 112, respectively.

Port Jefferson's main street forms a section of New York State Route 25A, a scenic and historic route through Long Island's North Shore from the New York City borough of Queens eastward to Calverton. Just southeast of the village is the eastern terminus of New York State Route 347, a multilane divided highway that connects to the Northern State Parkway in Hauppauge. New York State Route 112, an important north–south route, begins just south of the village and runs to Patchogue, with a dedicated bicycle lane along much of the route.

== Notable people ==
- Jesse Ball (born 1978), novelist and poet
- Howard Bayles (1877-1940), sports shooter
- Vernon Berg III (1951–1999), U.S. Naval Academy graduate and artist
- Walter Berndt (1899–1979), cartoonist, best known for his long-run comic strip, Smitty
- James F. Burke (1923–1981) cornet soloist with the Goldman Band
- John Buscema (1927–2002), comic book artist
- Robert Farrar Capon (1925–2013), Episcopal priest, author, and chef
- Vic Carapazza (born 1979), Major League Baseball umpire; born in Port Jefferson
- Vivien Cardone (born 1993), actress; born in Port Jefferson
- Ted Chiang (born 1967), speculative fiction writer; born in Port Jefferson
- Chris Colmer (1980–2010), American football offensive lineman
- Guy Cosmo (born 1977), racing driver
- Leslie Davis, Armenian genocide witness, diplomat, and author
- William Moore Davis, painter
- Tony DePhillips, Major League Baseball catcher with the Cincinnati Reds; resident of Port Jefferson
- Cathy Downs, actress; born in Port Jefferson
- Maurice DuBois, WCBS-TV news anchor; attended Earl L. Vandermeulen High School
- Dom Famularo (1953–2023), drummer, author, speaker
- Chris Ferraro (born 1973), former NHL hockey player; born in Port Jefferson
- Peter Ferraro (born 1973), former NHL hockey player; born in Port Jefferson
- Jackie Geary, actress
- Anthony Gelsomino (born 1970), American actor, producer, director and writer
- Les Goodman, former running back in the National Football League
- Dan Gurney, American race car driver
- Rebecca Kassay, New York politician
- Adam Klein, opera singer; born in Port Jefferson
- Toby Knight (born 1955), former NBA player
- Peter Van Zandt Lane (born 1985), composer
- Ed McMullen (born 1964), United States Ambassador to Switzerland and Liechtenstein (2017-2021)
- Alan North, actor; resident of Port Jefferson
- Frank Norton (1845–1920), professional baseball player
- Kaela Pflumm (born 1991), pair skater
- Elijah Riley (born 1998), NFL Safety, born in Port Jefferson
- Austin Roe (1748–1830), American spy in the Revolutionary War
- Bob Samuelson (born 1966), Olympic medalist in volleyball
- SIRPAUL (born 1976), musician and producer
- George Williamson (1892–1979), architect
- Tom Veryzer (1953–2014), MLB shortstop
- Louis Zukofsky, American poet, resident of Port Jefferson from 1973 until his death in 1978

== In popular culture ==
- Foghat owned a recording studio called Boogie Motel on Main Street; their 1979 album Boogie Motel was recorded there.
- The 1989 black comedy film She-Devil was shot on location in Port Jefferson at 161 Cliff Road. The pink-colored 30-bedroom mansion belonged to Bulgarian operetta singer and actress Nadya Nozharova, also known as Countess Nadya de Navarro Farber, who died in 2014. The house was built in 1870, and was almost 19,000 sq ft (1,800 m^{2}). The countess lived in the house for over 40 years. The house was demolished in 2017.
- In season two of Netflix's House of Cards there are ongoing negotiations regarding the financing of a bridge from Port Jefferson to Milford, Connecticut. It is referred to in the series as the "Port Jefferson Bridge". The idea is similar to many proposals that have been made over the years, collectively called the Long Island Sound link, including one project proposed from Port Jefferson to Bridgeport, Connecticut.
- Port Jefferson's Main Street and East Main Street were featured as part of NPR's "Mapping Main Street" project in spring 2010.
- The 2015 film True Story was filmed in part on the docks behind Danford's Hotel.

== See also ==
- List of villages in New York (state)
- Port Jefferson Power Station
- Port Washington, New York
