= First National Bank of Port Jefferson =

Historic commercial building in New York, United States

- U.S. National Register of Historic Places
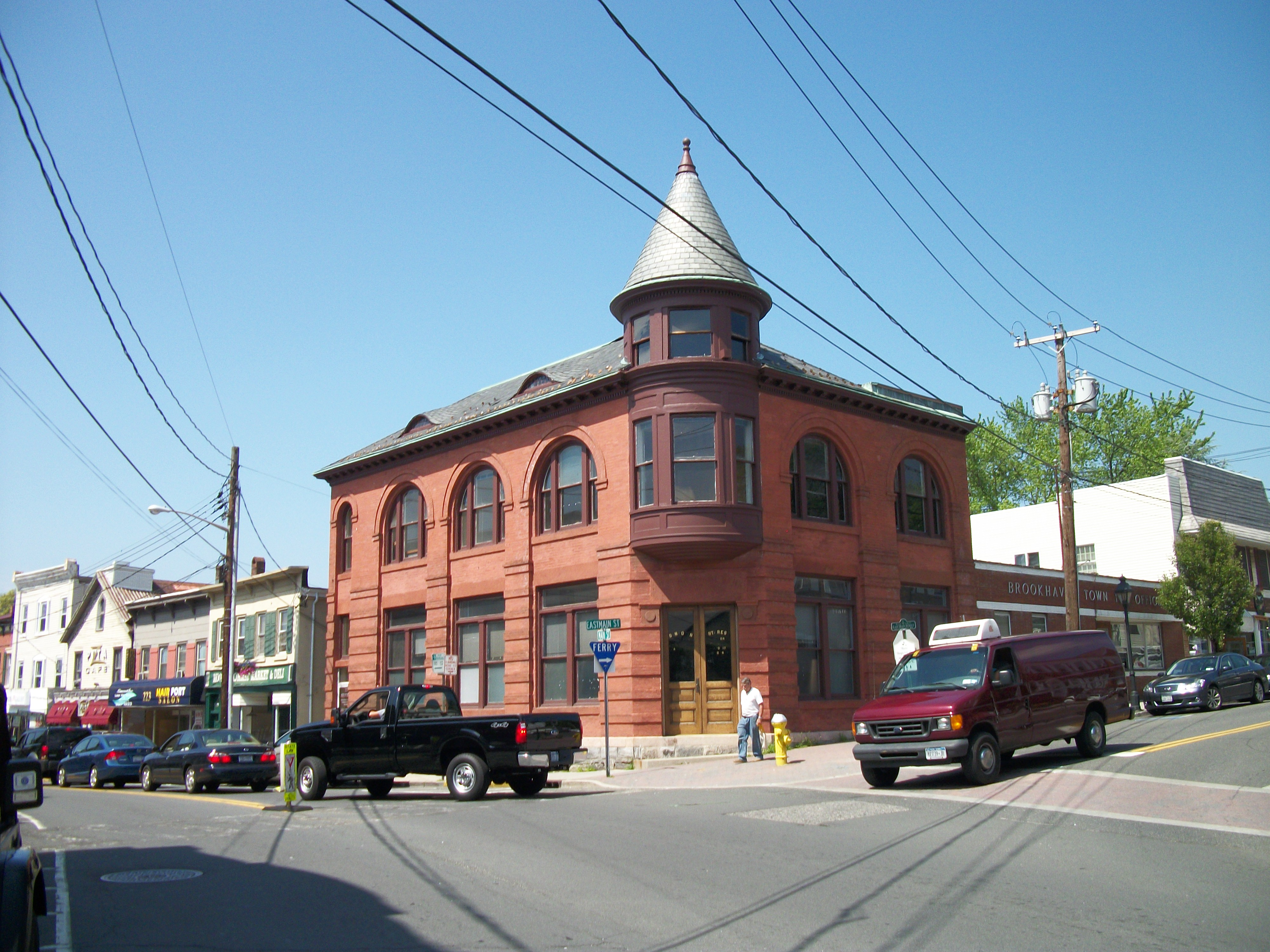

- Location within New York Location within the United States
- Location: Main and East Main Sts., Port Jefferson, New York
- Coordinates: 40°56′43″N 73°4′6″W
- Area: less than one acre
- Built: 1900, 1949
- Architect: Loper Bros.
- Architectural style: Late Victorian
- NRHP reference No.: 05001134
- Added to NRHP: October 5, 2005

First National Bank of Port Jefferson is a historic bank building located at Port Jefferson in Suffolk County, New York. It is a 2 1/2-story brick building with a 2-story turret that projects from the second story of the southwest corner and rises above the roof line. The turret has a steeply pitched, cone shaped slate roof and three windows on both levels. The main entrance to the building used to be directly below the turret, but was made into a window around 1949 when a 1-story brick, flat-roofed addition was built on the east side of the bank building. In 1948, the building ceased being used for a bank and was purchased by the Town of Brookhaven, who completed the 1-story addition the following year.

The building was added to the National Register of Historic Places in 2005.

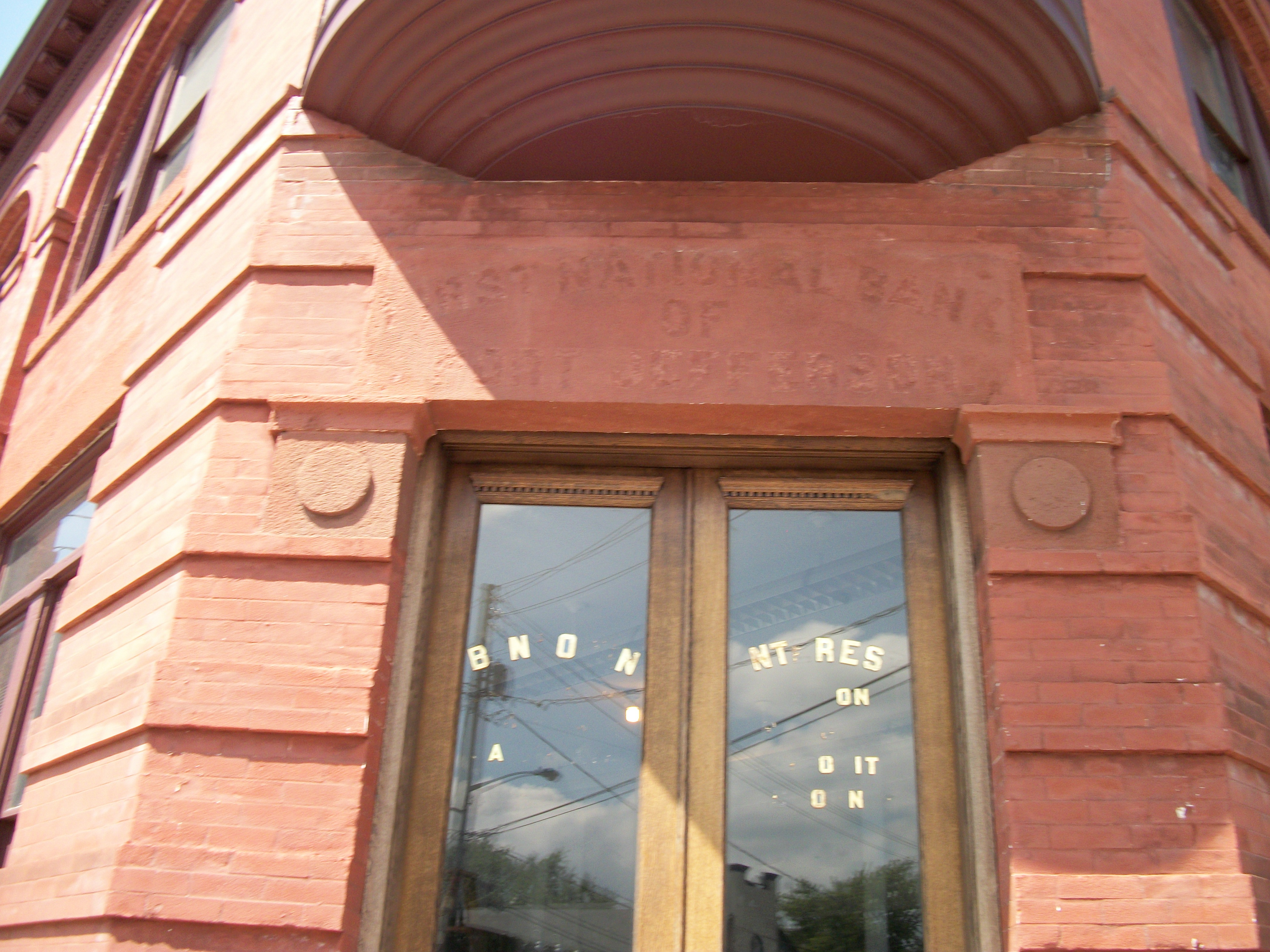
The front door of the building in 2010

In 2010, the building was owned by the Town of Brookhaven and used as their tax collector's office.

In 2011, the Long Island Music Hall of Fame was slated to open inside the building, at the time only existing as a website. Brookhaven town officials announced an agreement for a 15-year lease at the site. The hall of fame never came to fruition.

In 2013, a collectible ten-dollar bill issued by the First National Bank of Port Jefferson was put up for auction on EBay for about $5,000.

The building was unoccupied for many years, until in 2016, the buildings interior was remodeled to include first floor retail space and two luxury residential apartments on the second floor. The retail space currently hosts the store Kate & Hale, which opened in 2017.

== 2021 Safe Incident ==
In 2021, a teenage girl was rescued by firefighters after accidentally being locked in the Kate & Hale dressing room area that once served as the building's bank vault. 14 year-old Giavanna Diesso became trapped in the vault after the girl's younger brother closed the door behind her as a joke. Rescue crews from the Port Jefferson Fire Department used air chisels and hammer drills to breach the 12-inch thick wall. Diesso used her cell phone to record her surroundings to help see how much room they had to break through the vault. She was eventually rescued, being pulled out horizontally. The rescue took about 90 minutes.
