= Mather House Museum =

Coordinates: 40°56′46″N 73°03′56″W

The Mather House Museum in Port Jefferson, New York is local history museum complex that includes:

- the mid 19th century period Mather House house with furnished rooms, and local history and decorative art exhibits
- a craft house with a display of toys, spinning wheels and quilts
- a country store with items from a historic barber shop, general store and butcher shop
- a barn with shipbuilding and sailmaking artifacts
- a tool shed with shipbuilding and carpentry tools
- and a museum with antique clocks.

The house is the headquarters location for The Historical Society of Greater Port Jefferson. The house is located at 115 Prospect Street in Port Jefferson.
