= Port Jefferson Village Historic District =

Historic district in New York, United States

- U.S. National Register of Historic Places
- U.S. Historic district
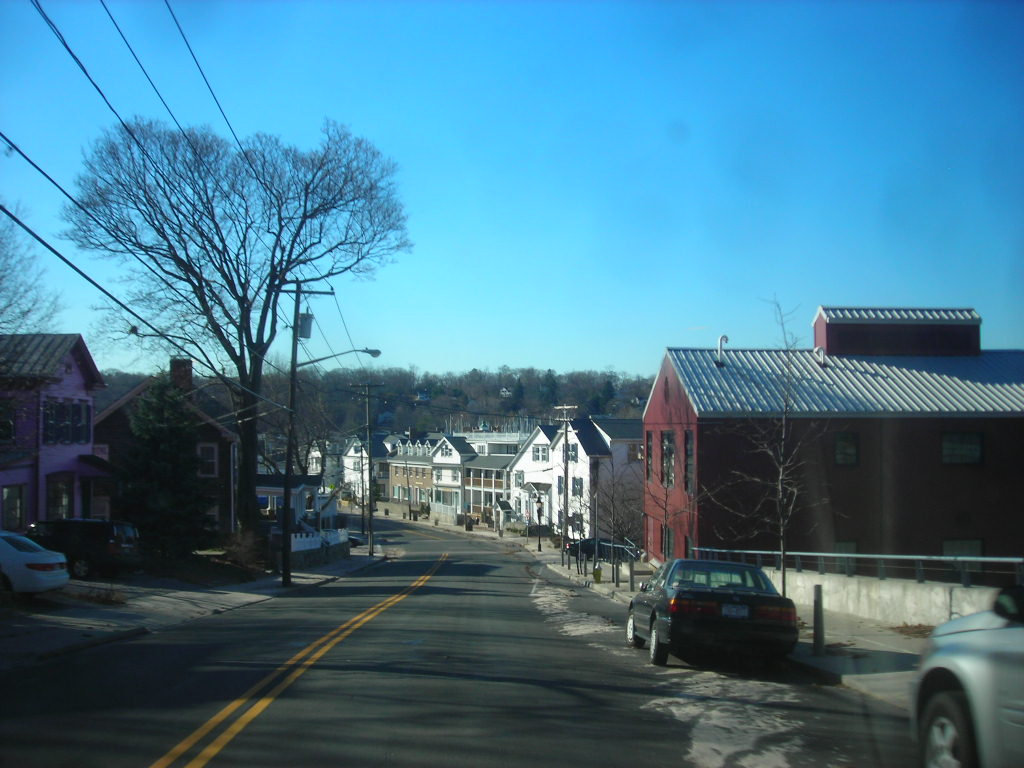
- East Broadway in the Port Jefferson Village Historic District, December 2007

- Location within New York Location within the United States
- Location: Roughly along E. Main St., E. Broadway, Grant St., High St. and South St., Port Jefferson, New York
- Coordinates: 40°56′49″N 73°3′58″W
- Area: 38 acres (15 ha)
- Architectural style: Greek Revival, Federal
- NRHP reference No.: 05000265
- Added to NRHP: April 6, 2005

Port Jefferson Village Historic District is a national historic district located at Port Jefferson in Suffolk County, New York. The district contains 98 contributing buildings. It includes a mix of residences, commercial buildings, and a church. The district is primarily residential dating from 1800 to 1915, with a majority built from the 1840s to 1870s in the Greek Revival and Italianate styles.

It was added to the National Register of Historic Places in 2005.
