= Anthony Gelsomino =

Anthony Gelsomino (born December 2, 1970) is an American actor, producer, director and writer.

Gelsomino was born in Port Jefferson, New York and grew up in suburban Orlando, Florida. He graduated from Lake Mary High School in 1988. After graduating from high school, he attended Rollins College in Winter Park, Florida and received a scholarship to major in Theater. He graduated from Rollins with a Bachelor of Fine Arts in Acting in 1992. After graduating from Rollins, he performed at Universal Studios, and subsequently moved to New York City and attended Circle In The Square's acting program.

Gelsomino then formed the NY based theater company Lucky Devil Theater Company and went on to produce a number of moderately successful Off Broadway productions of play he'd written including Bed Of A Poet, Chelsea Murder Mystery, and Madonna In The Title.

In 2013, Gelsomino received a Daytime Emmy award for his work with Will Smith in the 2013 Kids Choice Awards.

He is the writer and director of 100 Things You Always Wanted to Know About Shrek But Were Afraid to Ask So We're Gonna Tell You Anyway Movie Special.
