= Nadya Nozharova =

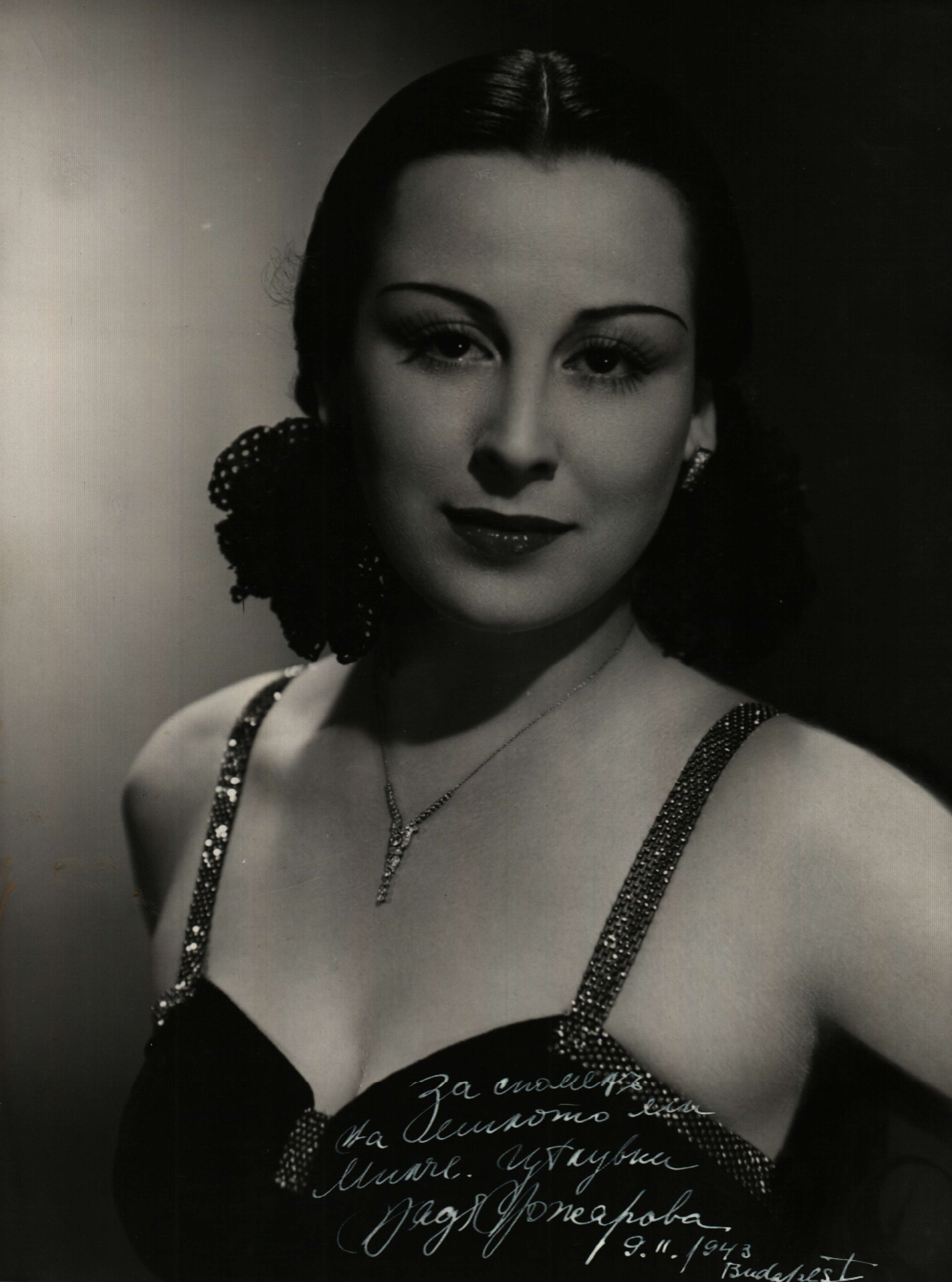
- Nadya Nozharova, image from 1942. Source: Bulgarian Archives State Agency
- Born: Nadya Mateeva Nozharova; 21 November 1916; Pleven, Bulgaria
- Died: 18 April 2014 (aged 97); Belle Terre, New York, United States
- Occupations: Singer, actress, entrepreneur, philanthropist
- Spouse(s): Angel Sladkarov (1936-1940); Count of Navarro (1940-1949); Sid Farber (1953-1985); Yuriy Farber (1985-2014)

Nadya Mateeva Nozharova (1916–2014), also known as Countess Nadya de Navarro Farber was a Bulgarian operetta singer and actress, American entrepreneur, philanthropist and Spanish countess.

== Biography ==
=== Early life and career ===
Nadya Nozharova was born in Pleven, Bulgaria on 21 November 1916. Her father was a tradesman for electrical materials. She studied at the American girls' school in Lovech, before she returned to Pleven and in 1934 started her career at the operetta theatre Angel Sladkarov with which she toured in Bulgaria.

After the disassembly of the theatre group, Nozharova played in the Odeon, Bulgaria, and Corporate Theatres. She subsequently moved to Germany, where she studied singing. Nozharova returned to Bulgaria in 1942 and starred in the film Izpitanie (English: Trial).

=== Family ===
After she started playing at the operetta theatre Angel Sladkarov in 1936, Nozharova married its namesake in the Troyan Monastery. In 1940 they divorced and the same year she married the Papal count de Navarro, a Spanish diplomat in Vatican City, from who she received the title "countess". They lived in Monte Carlo.

Following her second husband's death in 1949, Nozharova moved to the US and in 1953 married Sid Farber, who owned a building and real-estate company. The couple built a faux Moorish-style castle as a holiday home on St Croix in the US Virgin Islands. After his death in 1985, she received a large estate and married Yuriy Farber.

=== Charity ===
In the United States, she supported several organizations for assistance to Jewish and Venezuelan immigrants: the Red Cross in Monaco, the American Hospital in Paris, and the Princess Grace hospital in Monaco.

=== Death ===
Nozharova died on 18 April 2014 on Long Island and was survived by her husband Yuri Farber, her daughter Evgenia and three grandchildren.

== Gallery ==
Images of Nadya Nozharova from 1942. Source: Bulgarian Archives State Agency

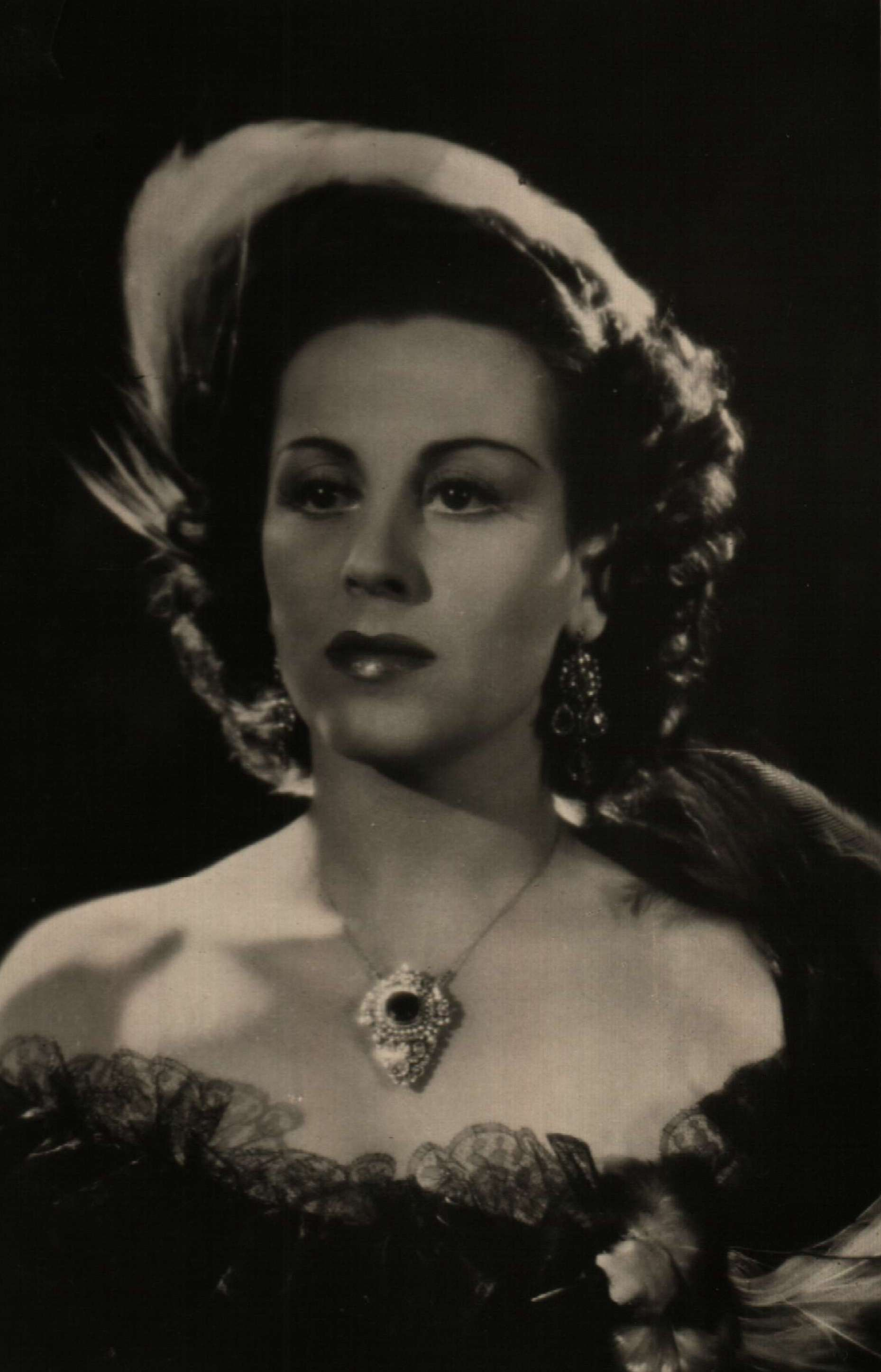

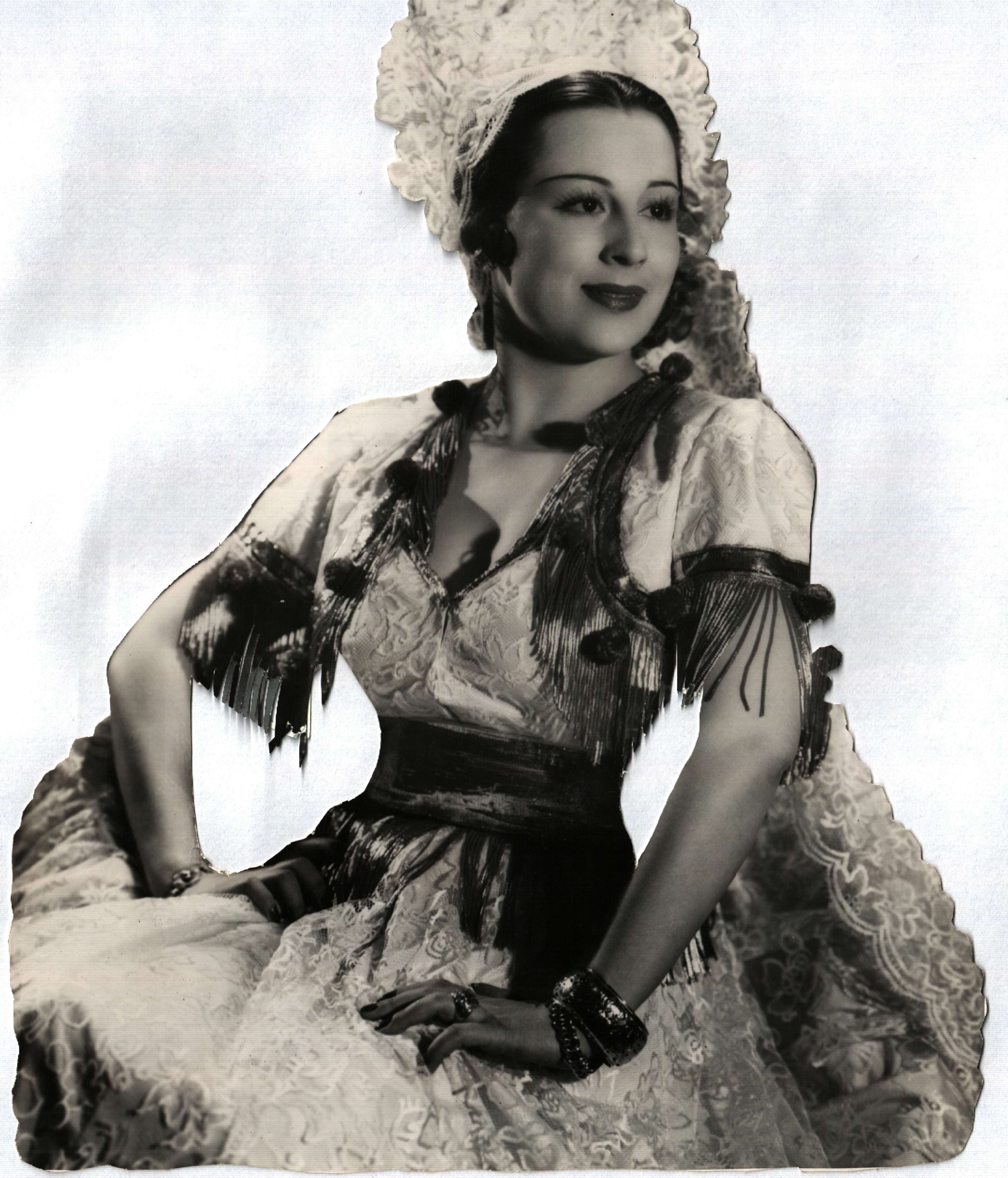

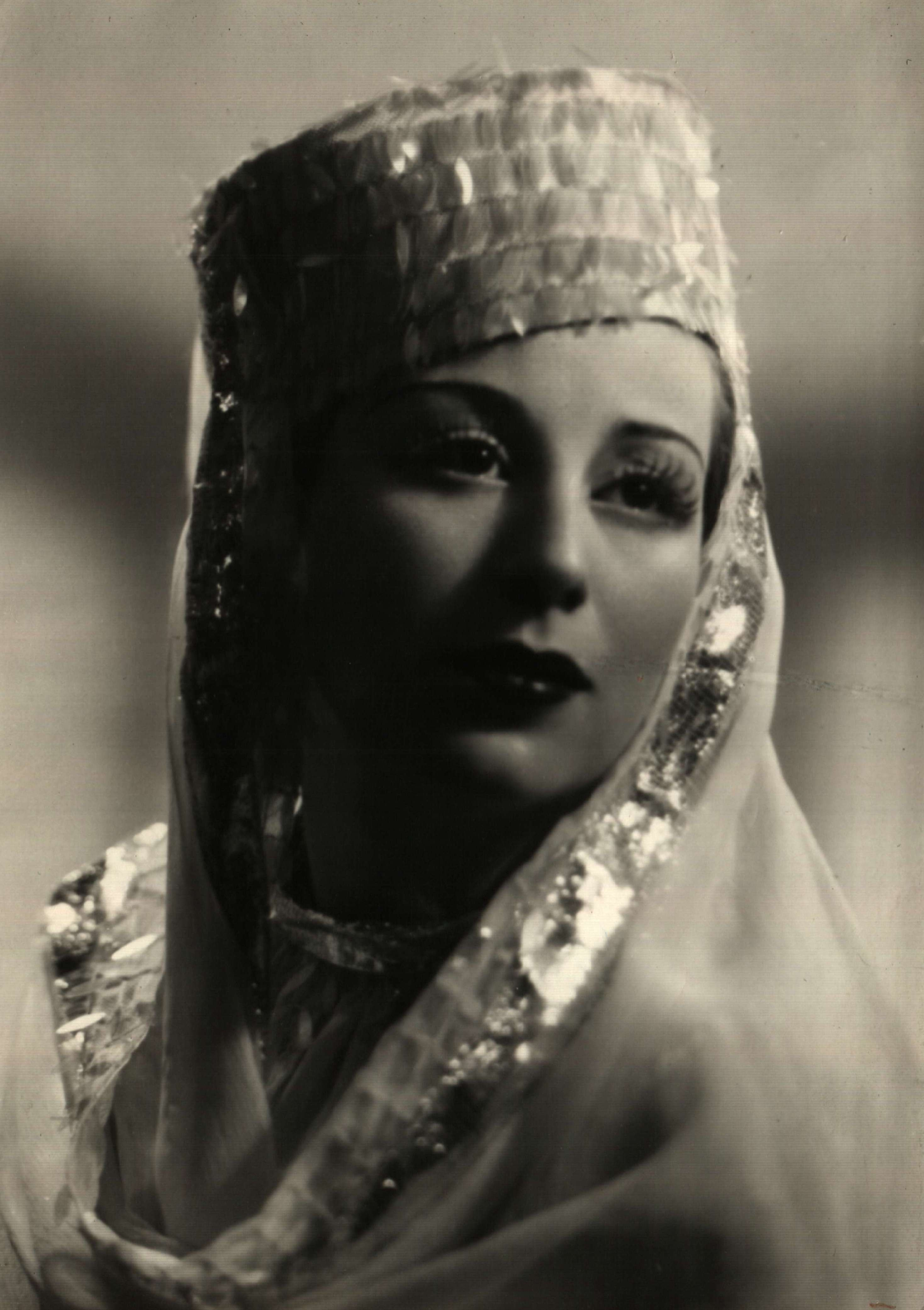

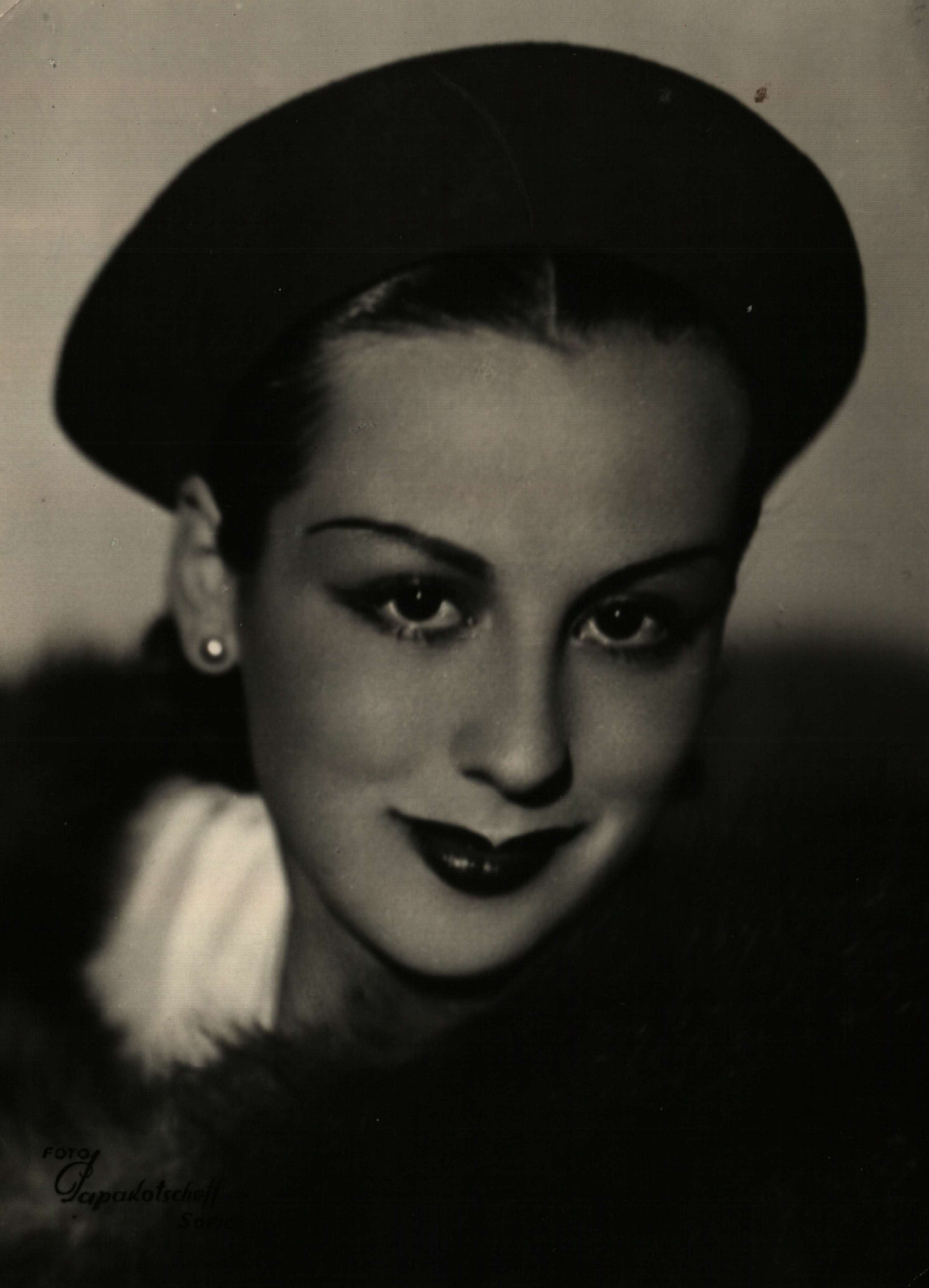

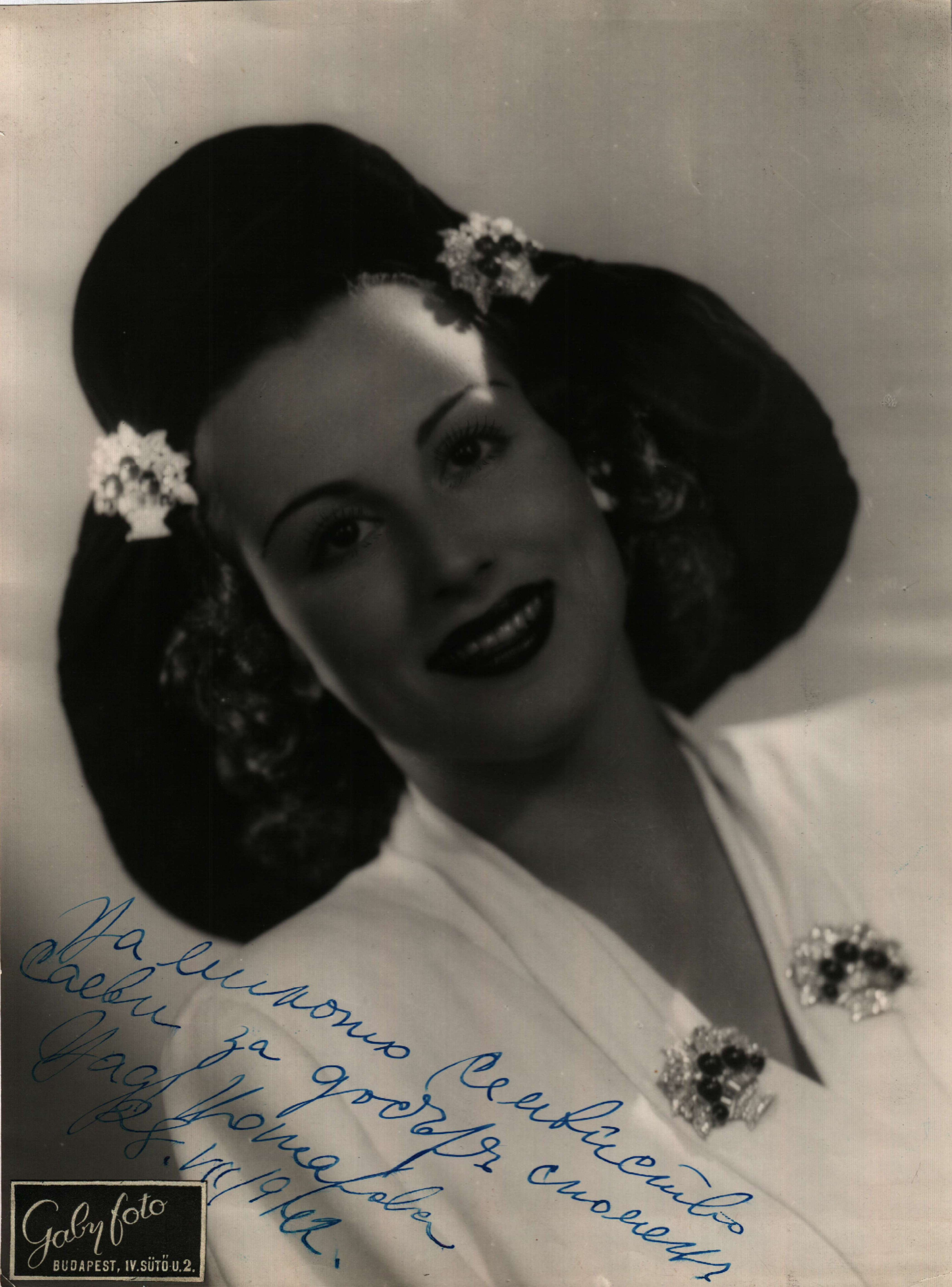

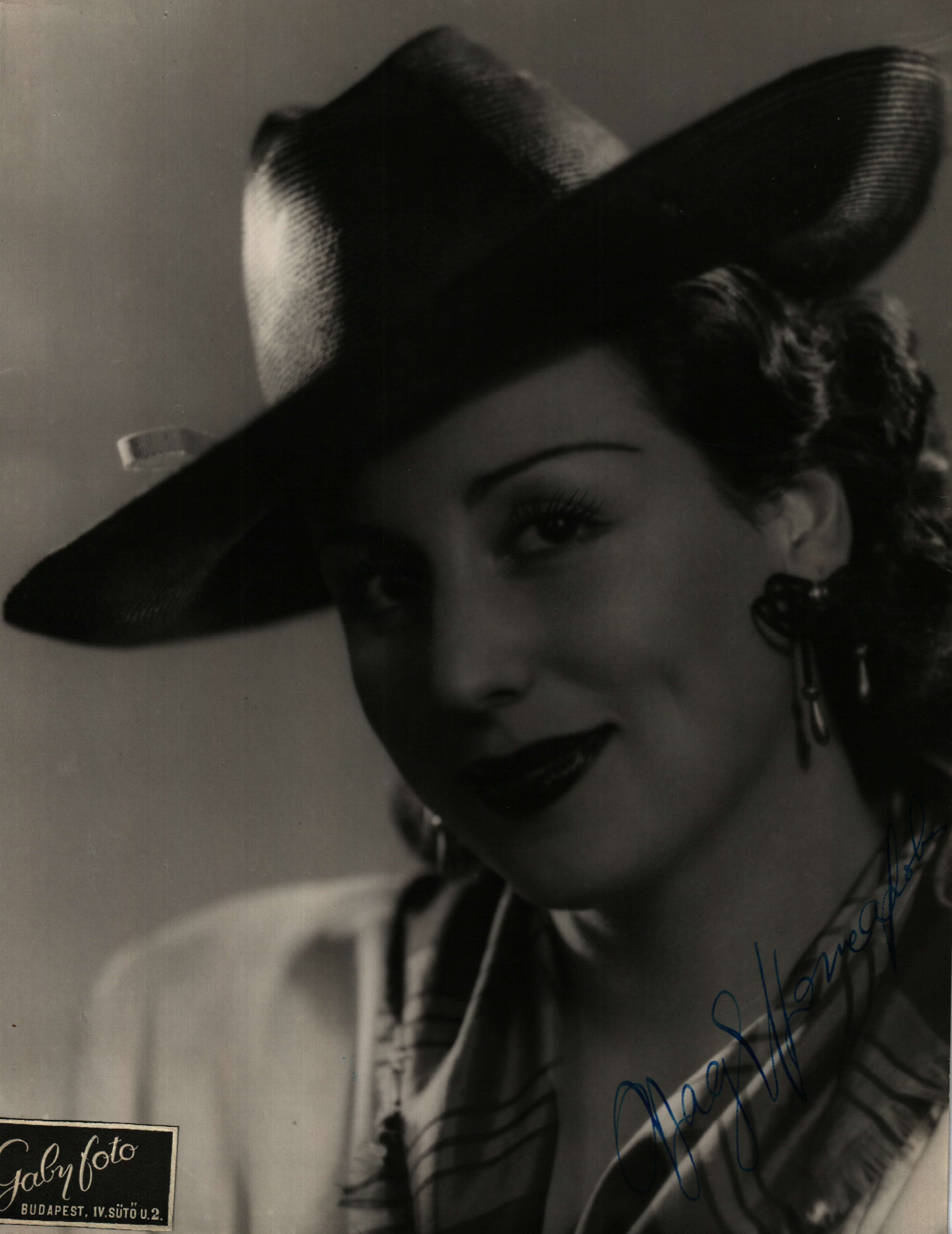

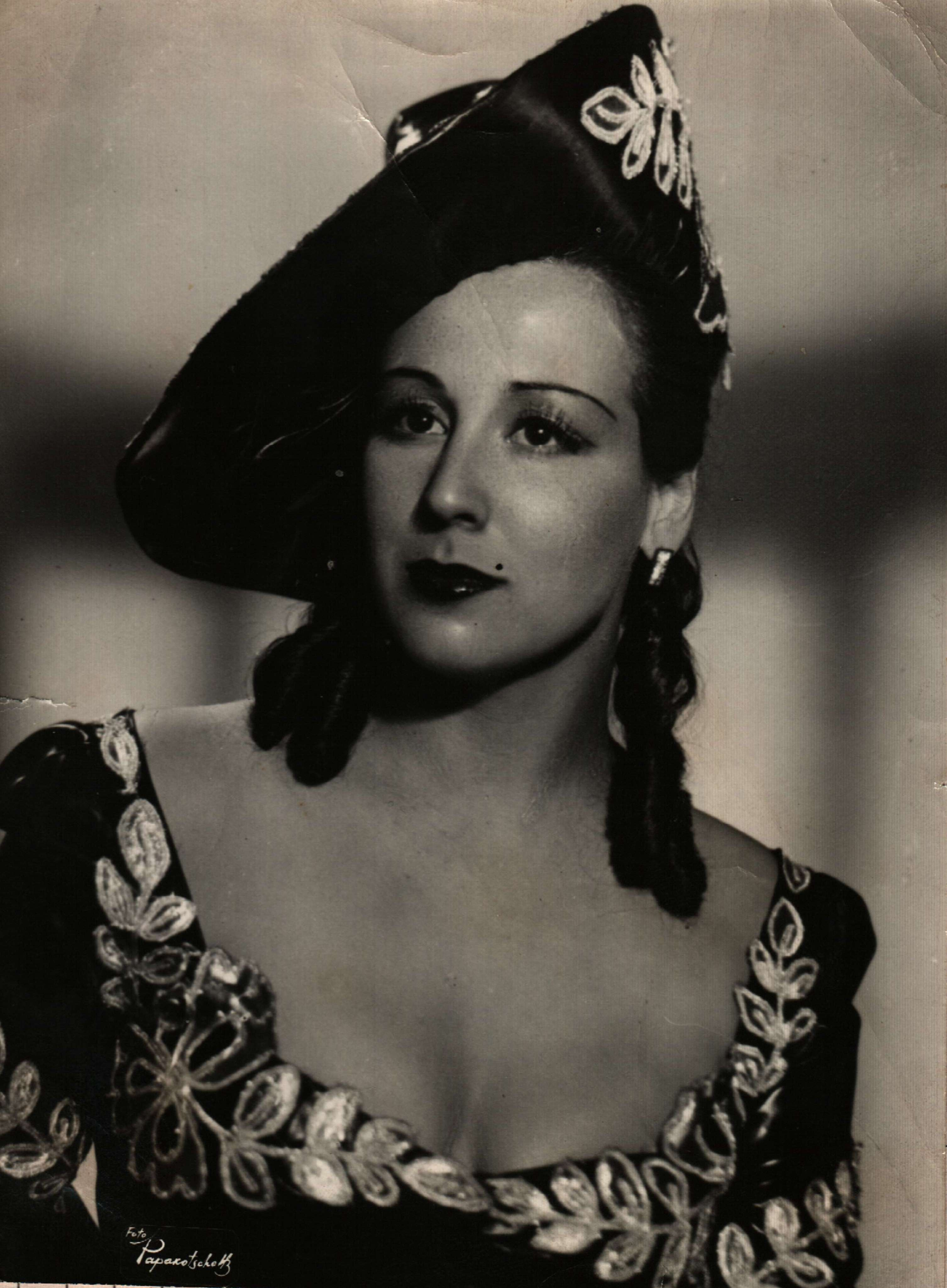
Images of Nadya Nozharova from the making of the film

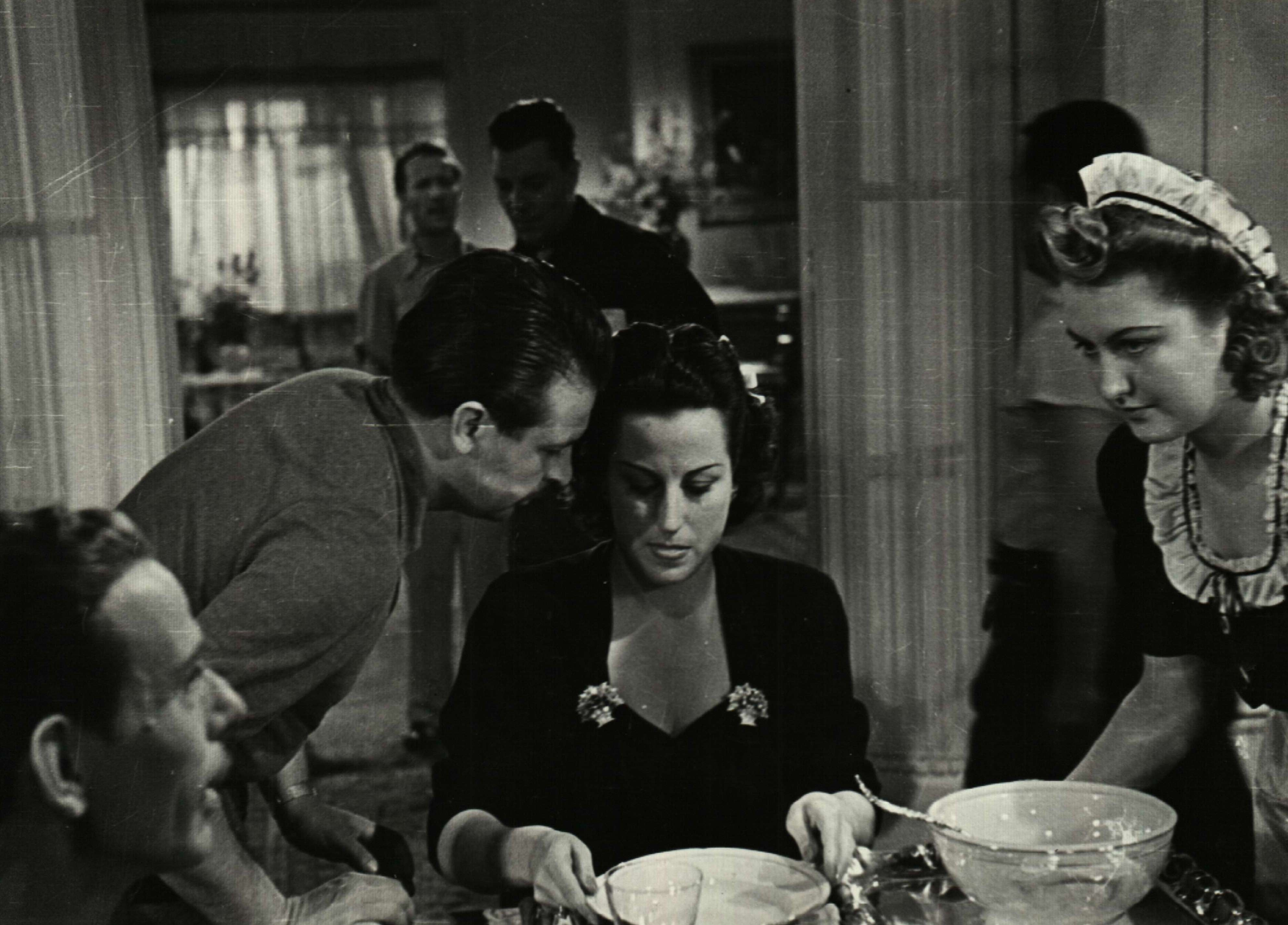

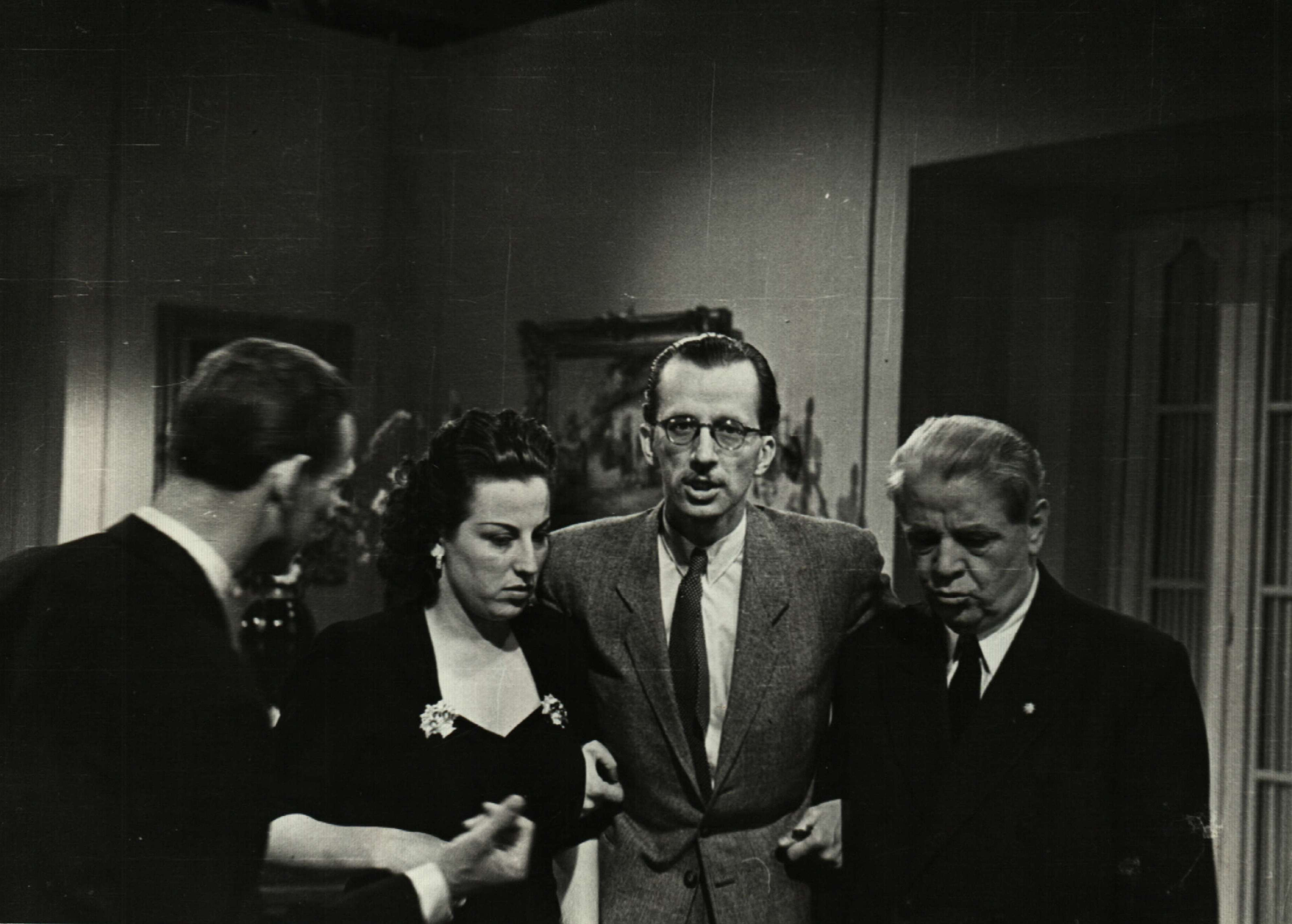

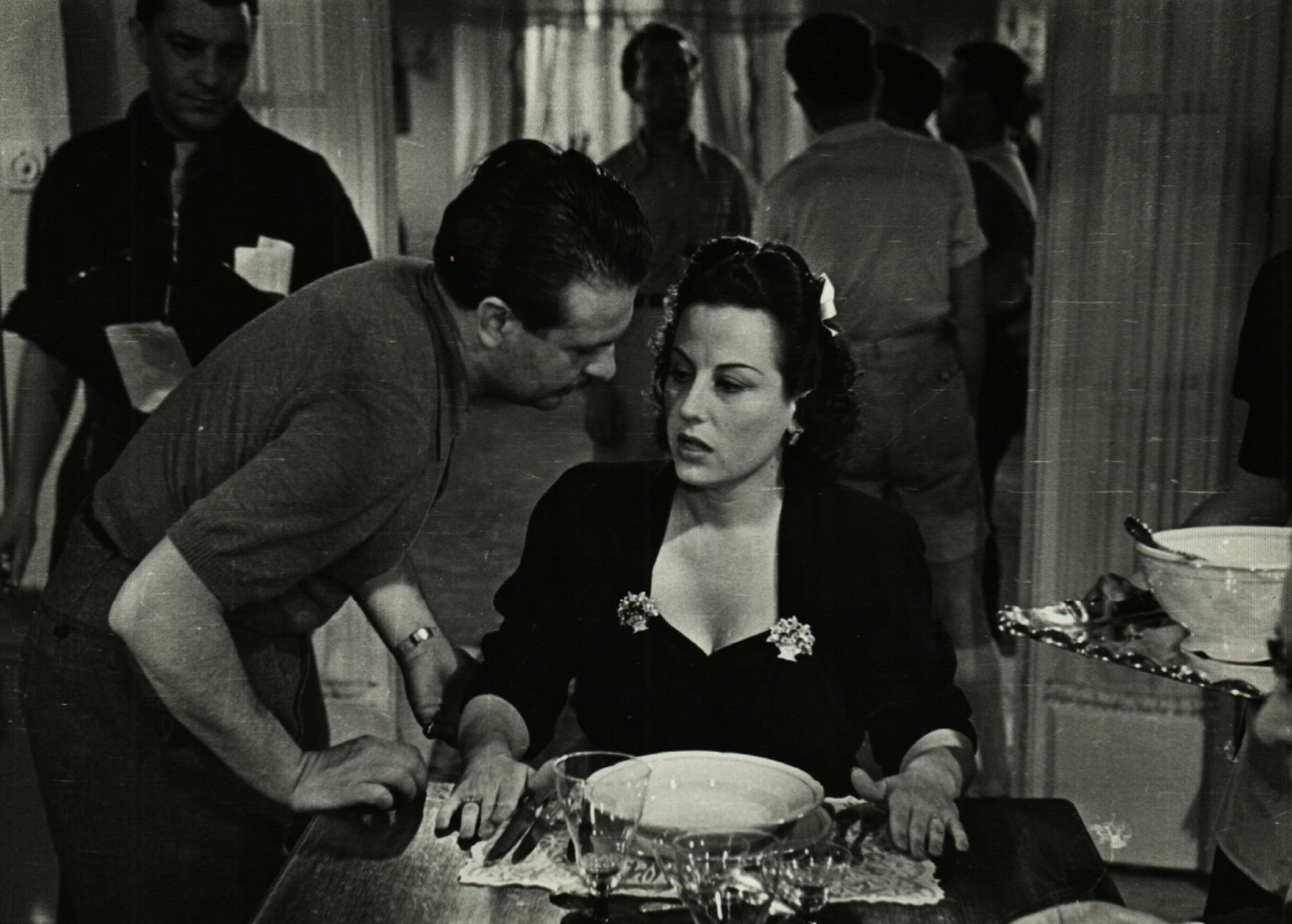

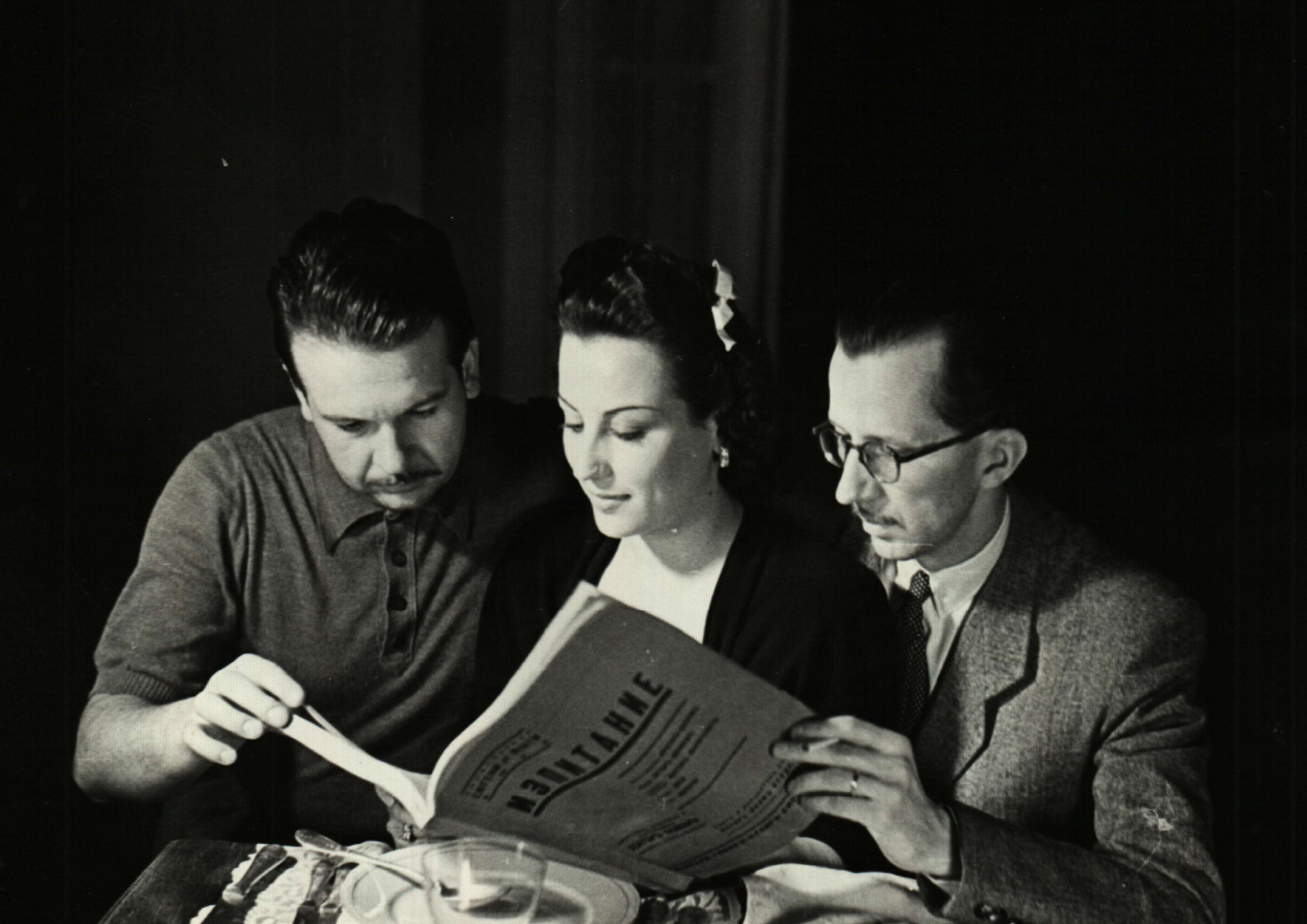
