= Theatre Three =

Theater in Athena Hall in Port Jefferson, New York, U.S.

- Athena Hall
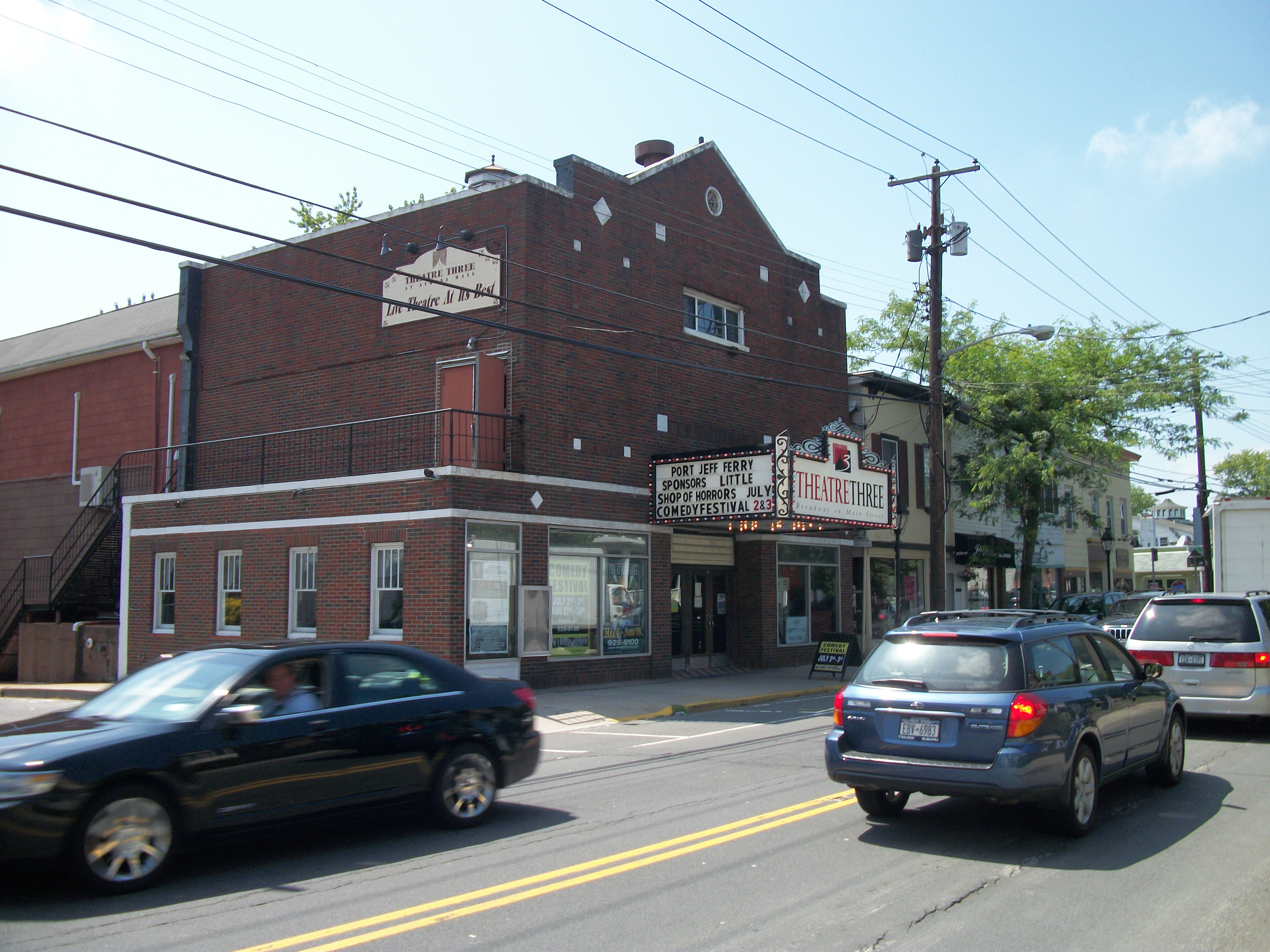
- Interactive map of Theatre Three
- Address: 412 Main Street; Port Jefferson, New York
- Coordinates: 40.94381°N 73.067856°W
- Owner: Theatre Three Productions, Inc.
- Capacity: 408
- Type: Regional
- Designation: National Historic Landmark

Website
- www.theatrethree.com

Theatre Three occupies Athena Hall in Port Jefferson, New York as a fully functioning, non-profit theatre company. Begun in the late 1960s, Theatre Three has become one of the premier theatre houses on Long Island.

== History ==
Athena Hall has occupied many uses in its long lifetime. It was built in Port Jefferson as a common meeting place for the town and at one point functioned as the high school gymnasium after a fire. The building that was built as basically a large cube was finally cut in half to produce the theatre upstairs with raked seating and lobbies and a second stage underneath. Athena Hall ultimately became a popular vaudeville house where a number of famous acts would pass through weekly. As vaudeville waned, Athena Hall became used more as a movie theatre. The famous "Griswold Film Splicers" were manufactured in the very shop of the building that is now used as a second stage. This piece of machinery was used for virtually every motion picture, professional and amateur and was considered the latest technology at the time. After its use for motion pictures, it fell into disuse until it was acquired by Theatre Three, a year-round, non-profit professional theatre that was founded in 1969. For the past 38 seasons, Theatre Three has occupied Athena Hall, a now 140+ year-old historic building in the heart of Port Jefferson.

== Mission statement ==
Theatre Three is dedicated to developing an appreciation for the art of live theatre among the residents of Long Island by involving as large a constituency as possible in a rich variety of programming which includes Mainstage, Second Stage, Cabaret, and Children's Theatre productions. The development of future audiences and performers is accessed through touring programs, a dramatic academy, and workshops. Theatre Three presents a diverse program of fresh and imaginative revivals of classics and modern plays. The theatre is an arena for previously unproduced plays, and works towards their future development. The theatre provides an environment in which talent can be nurtured, encouraged, and trained in the pursuit of a professional career. It is the goal of Theatre Three to attract familiar and established theatre artists to work with the theatre's own ensemble. Theatre Three expands its Long Island base by working with other theatres throughout the country in the development of programming and artistic exchange in order to achieve its goal of being the premier professional theatre of Long Island.

== Programs ==
Each year, Theatre Three presents a Mainstage season of seven productions (four musicals, two plays, and A Christmas Carol.) The Second Stage presents an ongoing series of events including small plays, original one-acts, staged readings, and cabaret performances. The in-house Children's Theatre presents nine original topical musicals. The Touring Children's Theatre offers four original programs dealing with child-at-risk or educational issues. Theatre Three's Dramatic Academy offers three semesters each year (Fall, Winter/Spring, and Summer) with classes for ages six through adult.

Theatre Three's Mainstage seasons have offered a wide variety of productions including the Long Island premieres of Into the Woods, Children of a Lesser God, M. Butterfly, Prelude to a Kiss, Mr. Cinders, Someone Who'll Watch Over Me, All in the Timing, Dream a Little Dream, and Pageant as well as the world premieres of The Irish Legacy, Before I Wake, and The Faculty Room.

Theatre Three's Second Stage has produced a roster of dramas (including Blood Knot, The Puppetmaster of Lodz, A Man with Connections, Samm-Art Williams Home, Agnes of God, My Sister in This House, Three Tall Women, and Death and the Maiden) and comedies (including Shirley Valentine, Frankie and Johnny in the Clair de Lune, and The Mystery of Irma Vep). The Second Stage has hosted cabaret performers such as Tovah Feldshuh, K. T. Sullivan, Marilyn Sokol, Julie Wilson, Billy Stritch, and Nancy LaMott. The Second Stage is also home to the weekly improv comedy show Friday Night Face Off.

The in-house Children's Theatre has presented programs on a wide array of subjects: the dangers of smoking (Puff-The-Not-So-Magic Dragon), honesty (The Boy Who Cried Werewolf), and race relations and the homeless (The Three Little Pigs, or Home Is Where You Hold Your Heart). An annual favorite includes Barnaby Saves Christmas to co-exist with the prominent Theatre Three's Mainstage tradition of A Christmas Carol. These programs double as entertainment and education.

The children's touring productions have included the anti-DWI play And These, Our Friends, which has been performing for the past eleven years. From the Fires: Voices of the Holocaust, the most recent addition to Theatre Three's touring productions, has been seen in schools and community centers on Long Island, as well as in Manhattan and in four other states, for a total of over 200 performances in the past three years. They recently put into effect their newest touring production, "The Bullying Project", an original musical about bullying in schools.
