= William Moore Davis =

American painter (1829–1920)

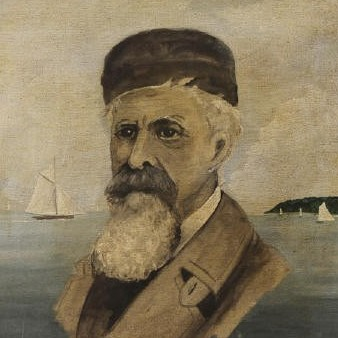
- Self-portrait with Port Jefferson harbor
- Born: May 22, 1829; Setauket, New York
- Died: March 26, 1920 (aged 90)
- Known for: Genre, landscape, and portrait painting

William Moore Davis (1829 - 1920) was an American painter best known for his landscapes. A native of Long Island, he spent most of his life near Port Jefferson and has been praised as the greatest painter of that village. A contemporary of the Hudson River School, he was greatly influenced by fellow local painter William Sidney Mount.

== Biography ==
William Moore Davis was born in Setauket, Long Island, New York, on May 22, 1829. As a boy, Davis worked in the shipbuilding industry of Port Jefferson before turning to painting full-time. Aside from a handful of years living in New York City, Moore spent his entire life in the Northwestern Brookhaven area of Long Island. He was strongly influenced by his friend and fellow painter William Sidney Mount, also of Setauket origins. Moore died on March 26, 1920, and was buried in the Sea View Cemetery in Mount Sinai, NY.

In 2020 the Long Island Museum held an exhibition entitled A Century After: The Work of William M. Davis.

== Gallery ==
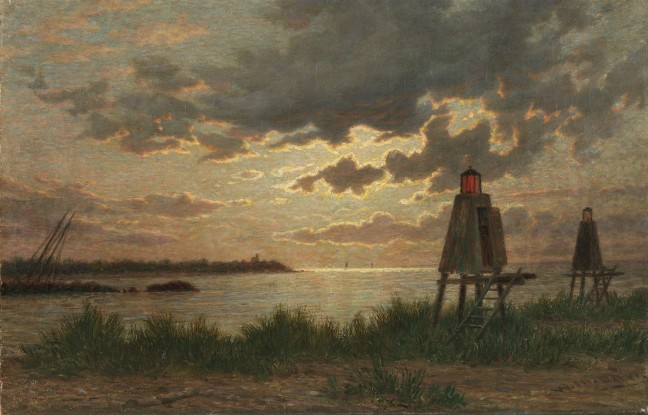
Port Jefferson Harbor

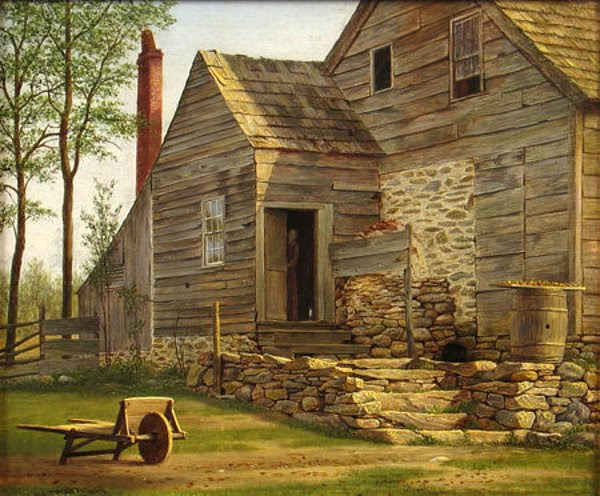
The Lady Behind the Door

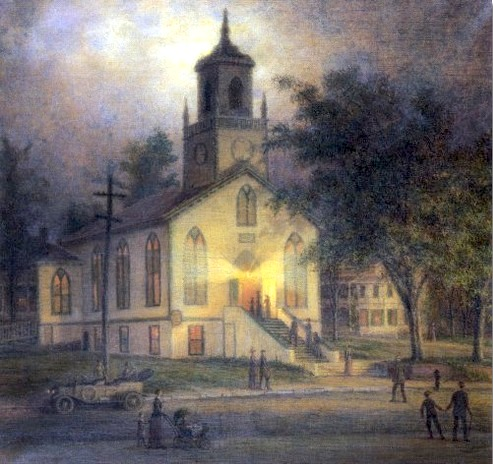
Lecture Night at the Baptist Church, Port Jefferson, 1912

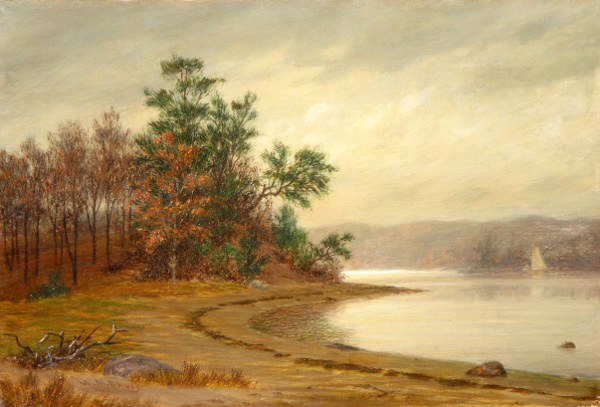
Tidal Inlet On Long Island Sound

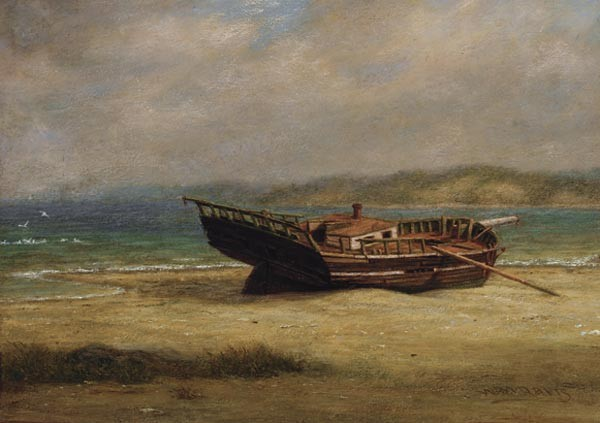
Wreck at Poquot Beach

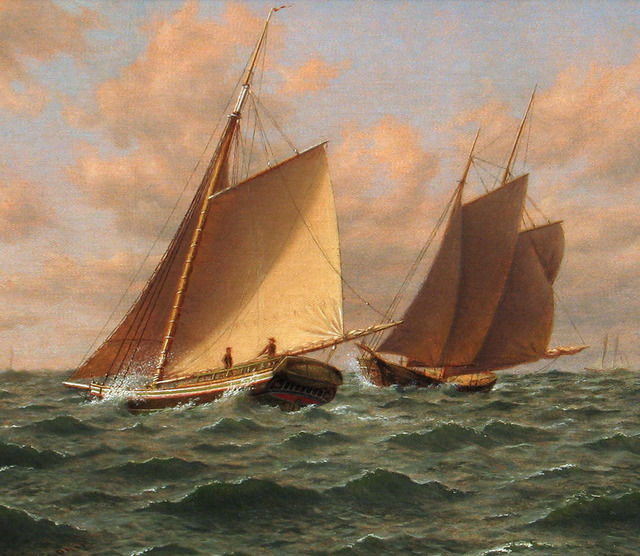
A Close Shave

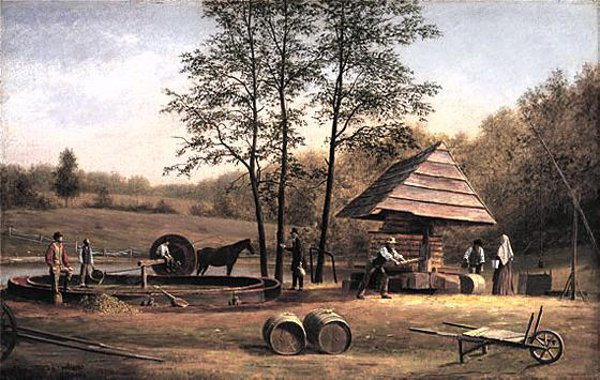
Cider Making On Long Island
