= Three Village Historical Society =

Archive organization in East Setauket, United States

Three Village Historical Society and Museum
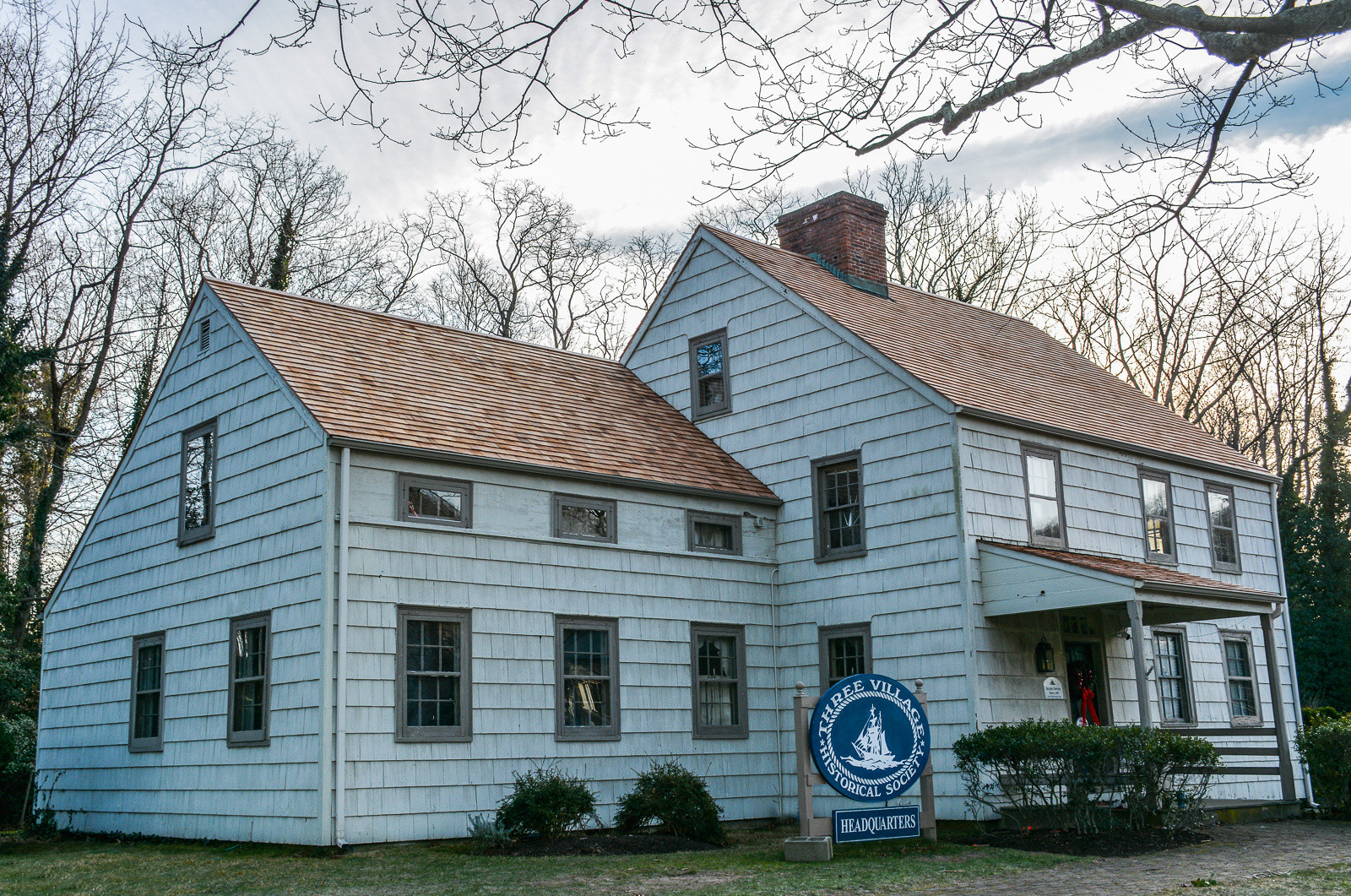
- Three Village Historical Society and Museum
- Former name: Three Village Historical Society
- Established: October 30, 1964
- Location: East Setauket, New York
- Type: History museum
- Accreditation: American Alliance of Museums
- Founder: Captain Edward Reginald Rhodes
- Director: Mari Irizarry
- Historian: Beverly Tyler
- Employees: 5
- Parking: On site (no charge)
- Website: tvhs.org

Three Village Historical Society and Museum (TVHS) is a historical society and museum headquartered in East Setauket, New York, that preserves the history of the villages of Old Field and Poquott, the Setaukets, and Stony Brook. The society educates visitors about local history through events, walking tours, and educational programs. Chartered by the New York State Board of Regents in 1966 (provisional) and 1968 (absolute), the society collects, preserves, and interprets materials related to the region’s cultural history, including settler-colonial history, maritime and shipbuilding industries, the Culper Spy Ring, Indigenous and African American communities, and local architecture.`

TVHS is headquartered at the Bayles–Swezey House (c. 1800) at 93 North Country Road in Setauket, acquired in 1998 as its first permanent home. The organization amended its charter in 2024 to incorporate “Museum” in its official name.

The society had great success with an exhibition about the area's Culper Spy Ring during the American Revolution. The television show Turn: Washington's Spies led to major interest among the public, with attendance more than doubling since the AMC show's debut.

In 2016, the society presented an exhibition about Chicken Hill, a historic mixed-race enclave that was destroyed by urban development in the 1960s. Chicken Hill was a now-lost historic multi-ethnic community. TVHS has curated exhibits (including a virtual one) to reconstruct and bring awareness to that history. Currently, there is a movement to save another historic mixed-race community: Bethel-Christian Avenue-Laurel Hill Historical District.

== History ==
=== Founding (1964–1968) ===
The society was founded on October 30, 1964, at the Suffolk Museum (now the Jazz Loft) by local residents who sought to promote awareness of the Three Village area’s history among residents and visitors. Present at the formation meeting were Captain Edward R. Rhodes, Bill Cabrey, Bill Minuse, Russ Atkinson, Andy White, and Bill Simpson. Captain Edward Reginald (Reg) Rhodes was elected the Society's first President. By the fourth meeting, they elected Bill Ploch, Vice President, Andy White, Treasurer, and Frank Davis, Secretary. The Trustees and members continued to meet at the Suffolk Museum until 1976. The society drafted purposes centered on collecting and preserving historical materials, safeguarding buildings and monuments, and disseminating historical information. A provisional charter was granted on December 16, 1966, and an absolute charter on September 27, 1968. The Regents of the University of the State of New York granted the Society a Provisional Charter on December 16, 1966, and an Absolute Charter on September 27, 1968. The Charter Members listed on the Provisional Charter were Russell A. Atkinson, Frank G. Davis, Ward Melville, William B. Minuse, William F. Ploch, Edward R. Rhodes, Percy W. Smith, William T. Simpson, Kate Strong and Andrew M. White.

=== First decade (1964–1973) ===
Under Capt. Rhodes (President: 1964–1970), TVHS launched the "Three Village Historian" in June 1965 and began a historic house-marker program, with local homes researched by members and signs decorated with a hermaphrodite brig motif referencing the Daisy, a locally built ship constructed in 1871 by Nehemiah Hand. The society also joined the American Association for State and Local History, began oral history collection, and appointed Bill Ploch to be the custodian of documents and artifacts. In 1967, TVHS helped convene the Association of Suffolk County Historical Societies; in 1968, a $25,000 gift established a building fund. The second President was Dr. Percy L. Bailey, Jr. (1971–1972), a retired college professor. Under his leadership Setauket, the First Three Hundred Years, produced in 1955 by the Setauket-Brookhaven Tercentenary Committee and long out of print, was reprinted in November 1971. Dr. Bailey also took over as editor of the Three Village Historian from Capt. Rhodes, editor since the first issue in June 1965. The first of many bus trips to historic places was held on June 5, 1971, when the Society visited the Richmondtown Restoration on Staten Island.

=== Second decade (1974–1983) ===
William B. Minuse was the third Society president (1973–1976). In 1973, the Society started to hold monthly meetings in the Marco C. Smith Building at Caroline Church. At this time, a survey of historic resources in the Three Villages was undertaken under the chairmanship of Dr. Karl D. Hartzell.

TVHS undertook a survey of historic resources and supported Bicentennial efforts, including the "Greening of Route 25A". The society collaborated on the "Three Village Guidebook" (1976; second printing 1977) edited by Howard Klein and illustrated by Patricia Windrow, and provided guides/interpreters at the Thompson House under an agreement with the Society for the Preservation of Long Island Antiquities (now Preservation Long Island). TVHS advocated for Brookhaven Town historic districts (approved 1978) and organized large public programs, including a 1977 re-enactment of the Battle of Setauket and the 1979 "Our Indian Heritage" festival. The society launched school-based local history programming (1979) and began processing a growing archive (1980–1982), culminating in the Capt. Edward R. Rhodes Memorial Collection of Local History at Emma S. Clark Memorial Library (dedicated 1983).

On March 1st, 1975, an agreement was signed with the Society for the Preservation of Long Island Antiquities for the Three Village Historical Society to provide qualified guides to show the historic Thompson House to the public. The agreement also included the use of part of the house as headquarters for the Society. Dr. Bailey and Jean Minuse first headed this effort, which continued for twelve years. Out of this effort, the Society developed a new interpretation based on the Thompson family in 1748.

The fourth President was Beverly C. Tyler (1977–1980). During his term of office, there was a great upsurge of activity within the Society. Many members of the Bicentennial Committee joined the Society. The Ward Melville Community Award, in appreciation of valuable contributions to the advancement of the quality of life in the Three Villages, and the Kate Wheeler Strong Memorial Award, in recognition of significant contributions toward the fostering of interest in local history, were created and were awarded for the first time in October 1977. The Society also took a very active part in bringing about legislation for the establishment of historic districts in Brookhaven Town in 1977 and in obtaining approval of the Stony Brook Historic District, the Old Setauket Historic District, The East Setauket Historic District and the Dyer's Neck Historic District in 1978.

The Society organized its first Candlelight House Tour, featuring buildings of historic and architectural significance, in December 1979. This first tour was for the benefit of the Setauket Neighborhood House, which became the regular meeting place of the Society the same year. It also became the Society's headquarters in 1985.

Dr. Robert L. deZafra (1981–1983) was the fifth President of the Society. In May 1981, the Society began an archaeological dig of a prehistoric (3,000–1,000 BP) Algonquian Indian tool manufacturing site near West Meadow Creek. Artifacts from this Frachetti Site, named after the builder who voluntarily halted his own development to make the dig possible, are now a part of the Society's collection. In June 1982, an emergency archaeological dig at the site of the Robert Nelson Mount House in East Setauket was sponsored by the Society and incorporated the local community as volunteers in the excavation and archival research. The artifacts from this site are also a part of the Society's collection.

The Local History Collection was moved to space made available in the Emma S. Clark Memorial Library in August 1982 and dedicated as the Capt. Edward R. Rhodes Memorial Collection of Local History on March 27, 1983. It has since become the most important project of the Society. The society had taken over responsibility for the Brewster Cemetery in Setauket in 1983, formed a cemetery committee, and cleaned up the cemetery, but this restoration of the stones and survey of the cemetery began a program that resulted in the restoration and survey of a number of Three Village area private cemeteries over the next two decades.

=== Third decade (1984–1993) ===
Ruth Regan (1984–1985) was the sixth President of the Society. An important step was taken when the Society agreed to coordinate the interpretation of the Stony Brook Grist Mill, starting in June 1984. The society continued to train millers and interpret the mill until it was closed for extensive renovations in 1988. The Ward Melville Heritage Organization now maintains and interprets the mill.

A series of oral history workshops was conducted, beginning in October 1984. As a result, an oral history committee was formed, and over the next decade, it added much valuable material to the society's collection. At the annual dinner in 1984, special awards were presented to Harvey Allen for his countless services to the Society and to the widow and children of the late Bruce Giles for his splendid accomplishments in preserving and restoring, for adaptive reuse as offices, the Old East Setauket School House at Route 25A and Old Coach Road.

Beverly C. Tyler (1986–1988) was the seventh President of the Society. The major event that year was the republication and updating of the Three Village Guidebook. This continues to be one of the most important printed sources of Three Village historic information available to the public. The twelve-year agreement with the Society for the Preservation of Long Island Antiquities for showing the Thompson House was terminated by mutual consent on December 31, 1987. SPLIA trained personnel to develop its own interpretation programs, although members of the Society continued to assist as volunteer docents until the Thompson House was closed for needed repairs.

In 1988, theatre scholar Glenda Dickerson, working with the Christian Avenue community in Setauket, collaborated with the Three Village Historical Society to create Eel Catching in Setauket: A Living Library. The project blended oral histories, folklore, and performance to foreground African American local history. Dickerson, then an associate professor of theater arts at the State University at Stony Brook, discovered that much of the community's history had survived through stories passed down for generations. Determined to preserve these voices, she gathered narratives in their own words. Theodore “Blue Medicine” Green, Chief of the Setalcott Nation and a TVHS trustee, coordinated with Dickerson to facilitate access to Black and Indigenous community members and to develop a walking tour that complemented her theatrical performance.

Dickerson's creative research drew on the talents of volunteers from across the community. University interns and teachers recorded oral histories with support from TVHS historians and Christian Avenue residents. The project culminated in staged performances at the university's Theater Arts Department, where oral histories, folklore, artifacts, and William Sidney Mount paintings were woven into dramatic vignettes. Eight professional actors portrayed members of the Christian Avenue community, bringing their stories to life. The Society's May 1988 issue of The Historian served as the program booklet for Eel Catching in Setauket: A Living Library – The African American Christian Avenue Community, ensuring the performance lived on as both an introduction to the neighborhood and a memorial to its enduring history.

Arthur Billadello (1989–1991) was the eighth president of the society. In 1989, TVHS also mounted Down the Ways: The Wooden Ship Era in the Three Villages, a traveling exhibition with public programs. The exhibit opened in the Emma S. Clark Memorial Library, and the library joined with the society in sponsoring a series of related lectures. This exhibit, along with a later collaborative endeavor, examined not only local people at home, but also their relationship to the sea and the significance of their lives at sea. The exhibit’s presence in the library also led, six years later, to the creation of the society’s major exhibit The Sailing Circle.

Franklin Neal (1992–1994) was the ninth president of the society. In June 1992, Sally Packard, Society Archivist, and the first paid employee of the TVHS, retired after six years working with the Rhodes Collection. As noted by Franklin Neal, "Sally can be credited with pulling our collection together and making it possible for it to be readily accessible and useable by the public." In 1992, the Society took a leap of faith by hiring its first director, Michele Morrisson, a decision that brought new opportunities but also financial challenges. The director and trustees worked to strengthen professionalism, deepen community engagement, expand exploration of the area's cultural history, and foster collaborations with local organizations.

=== Fourth decade (1994–2003) ===
The period between 1994 and 2003 represented a transformative decade for the Three Village Historical Society (TVHS). It was marked by leadership transitions, the appointment of new professional staff, the acquisition of its first permanent headquarters, and the organization's emergence on the national stage through exhibitions and public programs. At the center of many of these changes was the Society's first professional director, Michele Morrisson (1951–2007), whose tenure helped bring the institution into a new era of professionalization and recognition.

In January 1995, Jan Neiges succeeded Franklin Neal as president of the Society after Neal's three-year tenure. By mid-year, however, Neiges stepped down, and Vice President Margaret Olness assumed the presidency. These changes at the board level coincided with the appointment of new professional staff. Karen Martin joined TVHS as archivist in 1995, supporting the cataloging and management of growing collections, while Morrisson, who had been appointed director in 1991, was now fully engaged in developing exhibitions, pursuing grants, and strengthening institutional operations.

Morrisson brought significant professional experience to the Society. She earned graduate degrees in anthropology and museum studies at Brown University, where she worked with the Haffenreffer Museum of Anthropology. Before moving to Setauket in 1990, she had served as curator at the Shaker Museum in Old Chatham, the Roberson Museum and Science Center in Binghamton, and as fine arts curator for the New York Yacht Club. With this background, she became TVHS's first professional director, combining curatorial expertise, grant-writing skill, and long-term vision.

The defining achievement of the decade was the development of The Sailing Circle: 19th-Century Seafaring Women from New York. The exhibition was inspired by the donation of companion oil portraits of Capt. Benjamin Jones and his wife, Mary Swift Jones, reunited at the Society in the early 1990s. Intrigued by Mary Jones's documented voyage to Asia in 1858, Morrisson initiated research into the lives of Long Island women who accompanied their husbands on extended sea voyages throughout the 1800s.

Working with volunteers, Ann Gill of the Cold Spring Harbor Whaling Museum, and author Joan Druett, Morrisson secured substantial external funding for the project. Initial support came from the New York State Council on the Arts and the Suffolk County Office of Cultural Affairs, but the most significant breakthrough came in 1995 when the National Endowment for the Humanities awarded TVHS a $60,000 grant for the exhibition, catalog, and related public programs. This award represented the first major national grant received by the Society and placed it among a select number of small, volunteer-based historical organizations to have secured NEH funding.

The Sailing Circle opened at the Cold Spring Harbor Whaling Museum on July 2, 1995, and remained on view for a year before traveling to Mystic Seaport and the Castle Gallery at the College of New Rochelle. It eventually returned to Setauket, where it became a long-term installation in the Society's History Center. Drawing on diaries, letters, ship logs, journals, and artifacts, the exhibition documented the lives of more than twenty Long Island women and situated their stories within broader themes of maritime history and women's history.

The project also produced a richly illustrated catalog and an accompanying teachers' guide, A Teacher’s Guide to the Study of Maritime Women for Classroom Use, developed in partnership with the Three Village Central School District. In March 1995, TVHS co-sponsored the symposium Sister Sailors: 19th-Century Seafaring Women with the Cold Spring Harbor Whaling Museum and Hofstra University's Long Island Studies Institute. Moderated by Dr. Natalie Naylor and featuring author Joan Druett, the symposium reinforced the exhibition's scholarly foundation and expanded its reach to academic audiences.

National recognition followed in 1996 when the American Association for State and Local History presented TVHS with the Albert B. Corey Award, given to organizations that demonstrate “vigor, scholarship, and imagination.” At the time, the award had been presented only a handful of times since its establishment in 1974, and TVHS's selection placed it among a small number of local historical societies recognized for national significance.

While The Sailing Circle was the centerpiece of the decade, TVHS also expanded its broader programmatic offerings. Under Morrisson’s leadership, the Society secured additional grants through the Museum Assessment Program, the New York State Library, the Natural Heritage Trust, and the Suffolk County Office of Cultural Affairs. These funds supported training to increase the professionalism of staff and volunteers, as well as long-range planning retreats designed to chart the Society's future.

Educational programming became an increasing focus. Building on earlier in-school curricula, Morrisson expanded children's programming by establishing Discovery Day Mini Camps and family workshops. Collaborative programs such as “Museum Mornings” with the Mather Museum in Port Jefferson and hands-on maritime programs along Shore Road in East Setauket brought local history into interactive, community-based settings. Morrisson also secured funding to hire the Society's first part-time education coordinator, who updated existing curricula and expanded outreach to school-age audiences.

Signature community traditions were also strengthened during this decade. In October 1995, the Society hosted a members' reception at The Sailing Circle exhibition, followed by the Annual Dinner. The Candlelight House Tour, which had originated in the late 1970s, continued as a central annual event, drawing significant community participation and becoming one of the Society's most recognizable traditions.

Perhaps the most significant institutional development of the decade was the acquisition of a permanent headquarters. For much of its history, TVHS had operated without a building of its own, holding meetings and programs in borrowed or shared spaces such as the Setauket Neighborhood House. In June 1995, the Society relocated its offices to the Bayles–Swezey House at 93 North Country Road, a c. 1800 structure then owned by the Society for the Preservation of Long Island Antiquities (SPLIA).

Under Morrisson’s leadership, and with the support of the Board of Trustees, TVHS launched a capital campaign to purchase the property outright. The effort received a major boost in 1997 when Assemblyman Steven Englebright secured a $350,000 state grant for the acquisition. In August 1998, the Bayles–Swezey House was formally dedicated as the Society's permanent headquarters, providing office space, collections storage, exhibition galleries, and a gift shop. The dedication marked the realization of a long-held goal and provided the physical foundation for the Society's continued growth.

By the early 2000s, TVHS had established itself as both a professionalized historical organization and a community hub. Under Morrisson's direction, the Society expanded exhibitions, enhanced educational programming, developed professional training for staff and volunteers, and achieved the stability of a permanent headquarters. These efforts positioned the organization for sustained growth in subsequent decades.

Morrisson stepped down as director in 2001 but remained closely involved with the Society, volunteering her time, editing the Society's newsletter, and serving on committees. She later worked as curator at the Institute for Long Island Archaeology at Stony Brook University while continuing to support TVHS as an advisor and board member. Her contributions during the 1990s and early 2000s left a lasting impact on the organization, shaping its transition from a small community group into a professionalized institution recognized for its scholarship, educational programming, and community engagement.

== Collections ==
TVHS stewards artifacts; manuscripts and archives (anchored by the Capt. Edward R. Rhodes Local History Collection); photographs; audiovisual media and oral histories; a non-circulating reference library (≈1,000 volumes); reference files and a digitized deed database; educational “hands-on” materials; and archaeological holdings (>100,000 specimens).

== Exhibitions and programs ==
Notable initiatives include:

- Eel Catching in Setauket: A Living Library – performance-exhibit highlighting the Christian Avenue community; program and flyer documented in NY Heritage.
- Down the Ways: The Wooden Ship Era in the Three Villages (1989) – traveling exhibition with lectures.
- The Sailing Circle (1995–2003): exhibition and catalog on Long Island women at sea; presented at the Cold Spring Harbor Whaling Museum and venues thereafter.
- Candlelight House Tour (annual): longstanding holiday program featuring decorated historic homes, noted by local and regional media.

== Governance and staff ==
TVHS is a New York not-for-profit educational corporation governed by a Board of Trustees, with day-to-day management by professional staff (director, curator, education and engagement roles) and support from volunteers and interns.

== Headquarters ==
- Bayles–Swezey House, 93 North Country Road, Setauket, NY: two-story timber-framed farmhouse (c. 1800), relocated to its present site in 1961 and purchased by TVHS in 1998; includes a fire-resistant wing for collections storage.
- Dominick–Crawford Barn Education & History Center (under construction): exhibition gallery and second-floor collections area.

== See also ==
- List of historical societies in New York (state)
- Roslyn Landmark Society
- The Whaling Museum & Education Center
- Long Island Museum of American Art, History, and Carriages
- Raynham Hall Museum
