= Frank Melville Memorial Park =

- U.S. National Register of Historic Places
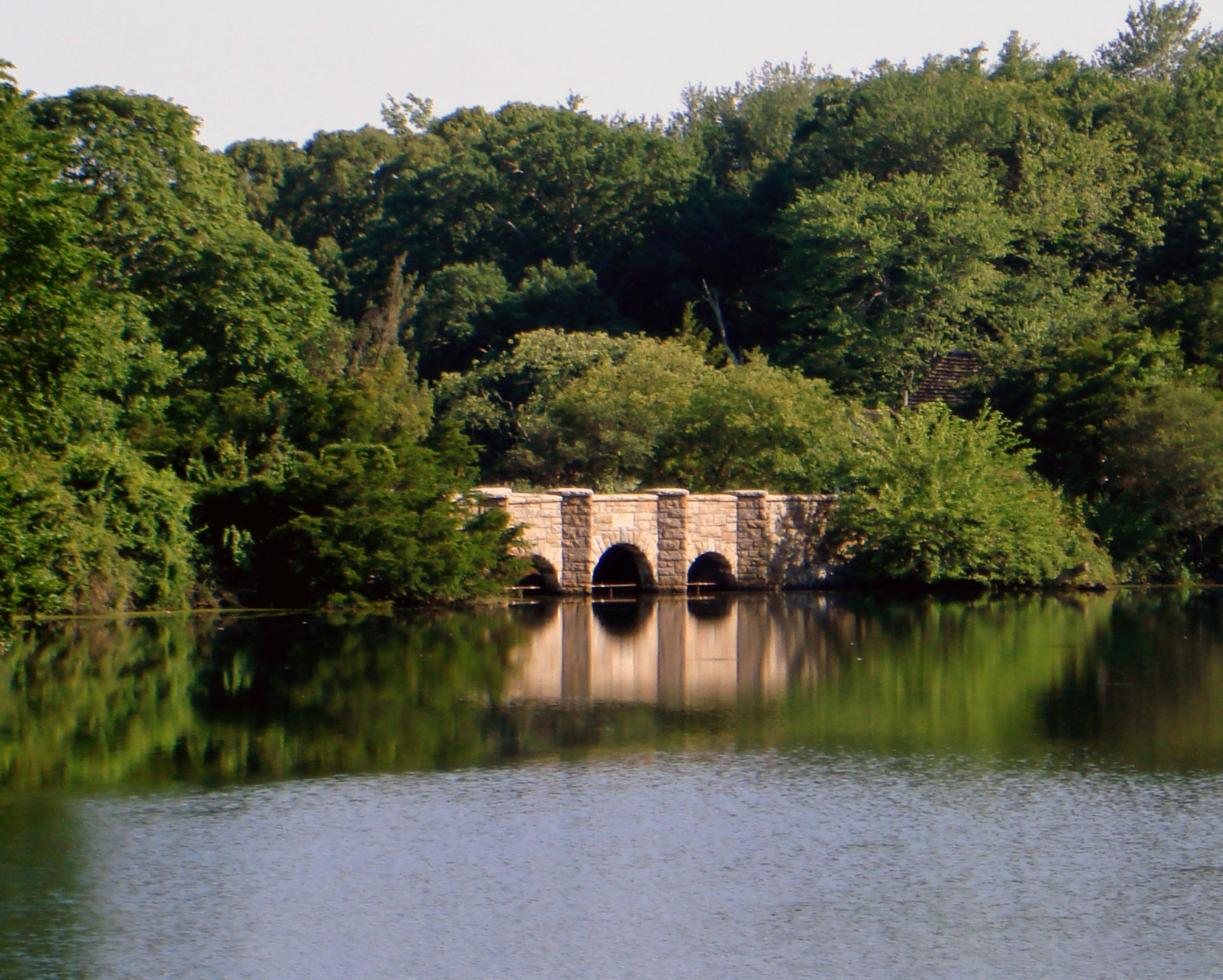
- Bridge on the mill pond

- Location within New York Location within the United States
- Location: East Setauket, Long Island, NY
- Coordinates: 40.94656°N 73.11567°W
- Area: 24 acres (9.7 ha)
- Built: 1700s-1937
- NRHP reference No.: 10000486
- Added to NRHP: July 19, 2010

The Frank Melville Memorial Park is a privately run, publicly accessible park surrounding the Melville Mill Pond in Setauket, New York. It was dedicated in 1937 to the memory of Frank Melville Jr., father of local philanthropist Ward Melville. The park was added to the National Register of Historic Places on July 19, 2010. The 24-acre park contains a walking trail and is also home to the Three Village Garden Club Arboretum, which is maintained by a group of local volunteers.

A series of mills have inhabited the Mill Pond as early as 1660. The current mill house was built with the help of Donald A. Spetta in 1937 and contains a running simulated mill wheel which continues this historical legacy. The mill house also services as the park headquarters.

Another historic structure is the Satterly Barn which was built in the early 1700s. A stable was added around 1937 and the structure was re-sided and re-roofed in 1968 under the direction of Ward Melville. Nearby is the John Satterly House which is claimed to be one of the oldest houses in the Setauket area. It was completely restored in 1968 by Ward Melville.

Another property owned by the park foundation is the Bates House, a 1922 Colonial Revival-style house that was acquired in 1955. The house is rented by the foundation year-round for special events.

Sitting adjacent to the park on the East side is the Patriot's Hollow State Forest. It is home to "Patriot's rock", which was once a meeting place of the Setalcott Indians and the site of Reverend Nathaniel Brewster's first sermon. During the Revolutionary war, it was the site of a skirmish with Tory forces garrisoned in the nearby Presbyterian church on August 24, 1772. The property was sold to the Three Village Community Trust in 2010.
