= Ward Melville High School =

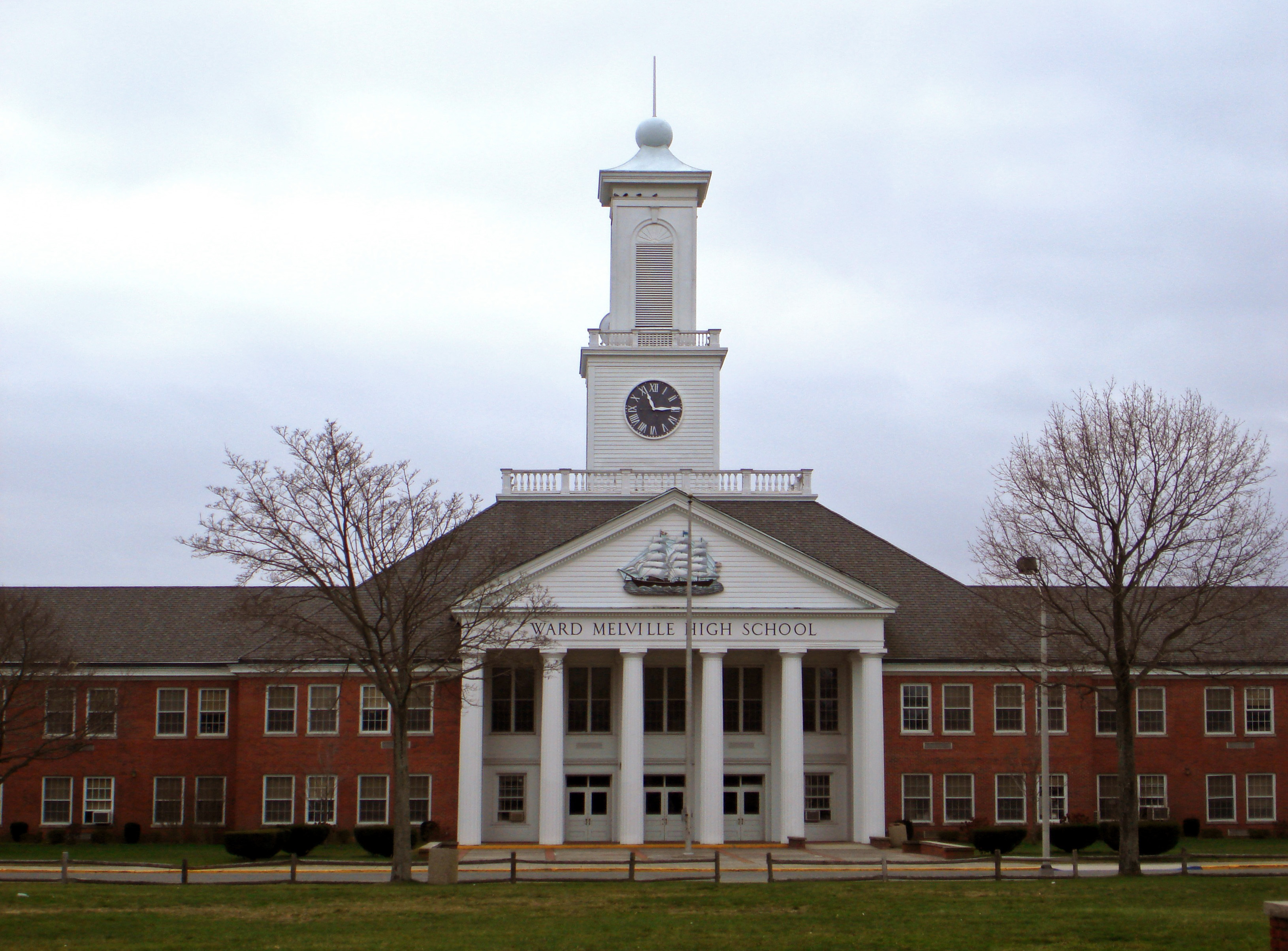

Location
- 380 Old Town Road; East Setauket, New York 11733; United States; 40°54′59″N 73°04′29″W

Information
- Type: Public
- Motto: Excellence in Education
- Established: 1968
- Locale: Suburban
- NCES District ID: 3628200
- CEEB code: 331740
- NCES School ID: 362820003809
- Faculty: 140
- Teaching staff: 139.19 (FTE)
- Grades: 9–12
- Enrollment: 1,492 (2023-2024)
- Student to teacher ratio: 10.72
- Colors: Green and gold
- Athletics: 22 varsity and junior varsity teams for boys and 21 varsity and junior varsity teams for girls
- Mascot: Patriot
- Website: wmhs.threevillagecsd.org

Ward Melville High School is a public high school in the Three Village Central School District of Suffolk County, New York on Long Island, serving grades nine through twelve. It is fed by the two junior high schools in the district: Paul J. Gelinas Middle School and Robert Cushman Murphy Middle School, and is named after businessman and philanthropist Ward Melville.

Located sixty miles from Manhattan in the Three Village area, Ward Melville High School is situated in East Setauket, New York. The school serves students from Setauket, East Setauket, Stony Brook, Old Field, Strongs Neck, Poquott, and South Setauket.

As of the 2023–24 school year, the school had an enrollment of 1,491 students and 135 classroom teachers (on an FTE basis), for a student-teacher ratio of 11:1.

The building was originally designed to have 290,700 square feet (27,010 m^{2}) with capacity for 2,000 students, although it has been expanded several times since. Each of the four grades currently has approximately 600 students.

The district provides for numerous clubs and activities after school, including a musical–theater arts program and many sports teams. The school offers 25 different Advanced Placement courses and another 25 college courses that are offered credit through several colleges and universities.

The school has been expanded several times to accommodate the growing number of students attending Ward Melville High School. In 2002, two extra wings were added to the northeastern and southeastern corners of the school. During the 2009–2010 school year, a new weight training facility was completed in the rear of the school while the music rooms were renovated. In the 2010–2011 school year, an additional wing was built to house the science department while the auditorium and the library was refurbished.

== Achievements ==
Ward Melville High School has been recognized as a School of Excellence by the United States Department of Education and carries this designation on each student's transcript and diploma. It was ranked within the top 500 high schools in America in 2004 by MSNBC Newsweek. It was named, among three other Long Island high schools, a National Blue Ribbon winner for academic excellence by the U.S. Department of Education in 2022.

The proximity of Ward Melville to Stony Brook University has encouraged the school to house a very strong science research program. This program annually produces many winners in the Intel Science Talent Search, the Intel International Science and Engineering Fair and other science competitions. In 1998, Ward Melville had the highest number of Science Talent Search finalists in the United States (4 out of 40), and in 2006, it tied for the greatest number of semifinalists (12 out of 300). In 2008, Ward Melville achieved the highest number of Intel Semifinalists in the nation with 13 students. Over the past nine years, 2002–2010, Ward Melville has produced a total of 85 Intel semi-finalists and 11 finalists, the third-most of any secondary school in the United States.

=== Lacrosse ===
The school's lacrosse team has won several New York State championships: 1978, 1988, 1989, 1992, 1997, 1999, 2000, 2013, 2017, and 2018. The team has a healthy rivalry with West Islip High School. The Patriots went 22-0 and received the number one national ranking in 2013.

=== Baseball ===
The Patriots won their first Long Island Championship in the 2013 season.

=== Players ===
In 2008 the Ward Melville Players won a Theatre Arts Scholarship Recognition Award (Teeny Award) for Innovation in Theatre Education.

== Extracurriculars ==
Ward Melville high school offers a wide range of extracurricular activities for its students. These include a nationally ranked Science Olympiad team, the "InSTAR" program, which has been very successful in preparing students for the Regeneron Science Talent Search, acclaimed theater and music programs, and others.

In 2013, a faith-based club, Students United in Faith (SUIF), was rejected due to its religious nature. After being faced with legal action by the Liberty Institute, the school superintendent investigated and reversed the decision, stating that the initial reason for rejection was "inaccurately conveyed".

On October 6, 2014, the school was once again faced with legal action by the Liberty Institute for rejecting SUIF's renewal. The club was supposedly unable to maintain a group number of 20 or more, the purported minimum required by the school. The Equal Access Act of 1984, which is cited as a major point in the club's renewal, does not respect local club minimums.

== Notable alumni ==
Notable alumni of Ward Melville High School include:

- Ben Brown (baseball) MLB Pitcher for the Chicago Cubs.
- Aaron Albano aka Ming (Class of 1990) - Grammy Nominated record producer, songwriter and DJ
- Marco Beltrami (Class of 1984) – professional film composer (Scream, Terminator 3: Rise of the Machines)
- Greg Cattrano (Class of 1993) – MLL goalie for the Baltimore Bayhawks
- Christopher Cantwell (Class of 1998) - white supremacist
- Chris Dieterich (Class of 1976) – NFL lineman for the Detroit Lions, 1980–86
- Michael R. Douglas (Class of 1979) – worldwide leading string theorist
- Brooke Ellison (Class of 1996) – the first person with quadriplegia to graduate from Harvard University
- Michael J. Epstein (Class of 1994) - filmmaker, musician, and writer
- Ken Eriksen (Class of 1979) - USA Olympic Team Women's Softball Asst/Head Coach (2002–present)
- Mick Foley (Class of 1983) – professional wrestler and author
- John Fugelsang (Class of 1987) – host of America's Funniest Home Videos, 1997–2000, CNN Contributor
- Dorothy Gambrell (Class of 1996) – cartoonist
- Jarrod Gorbel (Class of 1993) – indie pop singer-songwriter
- Terrance Hobbs - lead guitarist for Suffocation
- Kevin James (Class of 1983) – comedian/actor (The King of Queens).
- Karsh Kale (Class of 1992) - musician, producer and composer
- Anthony Kay (Class of 2013) - MLB pitcher for the New York Mets
- Brian MacDevitt (Class of 1973) – four-time Tony Award-winning lighting designer
- Steven Matz (Class of 2009) - MLB pitcher for the St. Louis Cardinals.
- Mark Orton (Class of 1986) - feature film composer (Nebraska, The Good Girl)
- Nick Piccininni (Class of 2015) - mixed martial artist and three-time NCAA Division I All-American in wrestling
- R.A. the Rugged Man (Class of 1991) – hip hop artist and filmmaker
- Burton Rocks, writer and sports agent
- Todd Sauerbrun (Class of 1991) – retired NFL punter who played for the Chicago Bears, Kansas City Chiefs, Carolina Panthers, and Denver Broncos 1995–2007.
- Andrew Scheps (Class of 1984) – Grammy winning record producer/engineer (U2, Red Hot Chili Peppers, Johnny Cash)
- Joe Silipo – former professional football player
- Alex Sobel - basketball player for Hapoel Haifa of the Israeli Basketball Premier League
- Todd Wider (Class of 1982) - plastic surgeon and Emmy and Oscar winning documentary producer and director
- Joyce Yang (Class of 2004) – concert pianist; silver medalist, 2005 Van Cliburn International Piano Competition.
