= Brewster House (East Setauket, New York) =

Historic house in New York, United States

- U.S. National Register of Historic Places
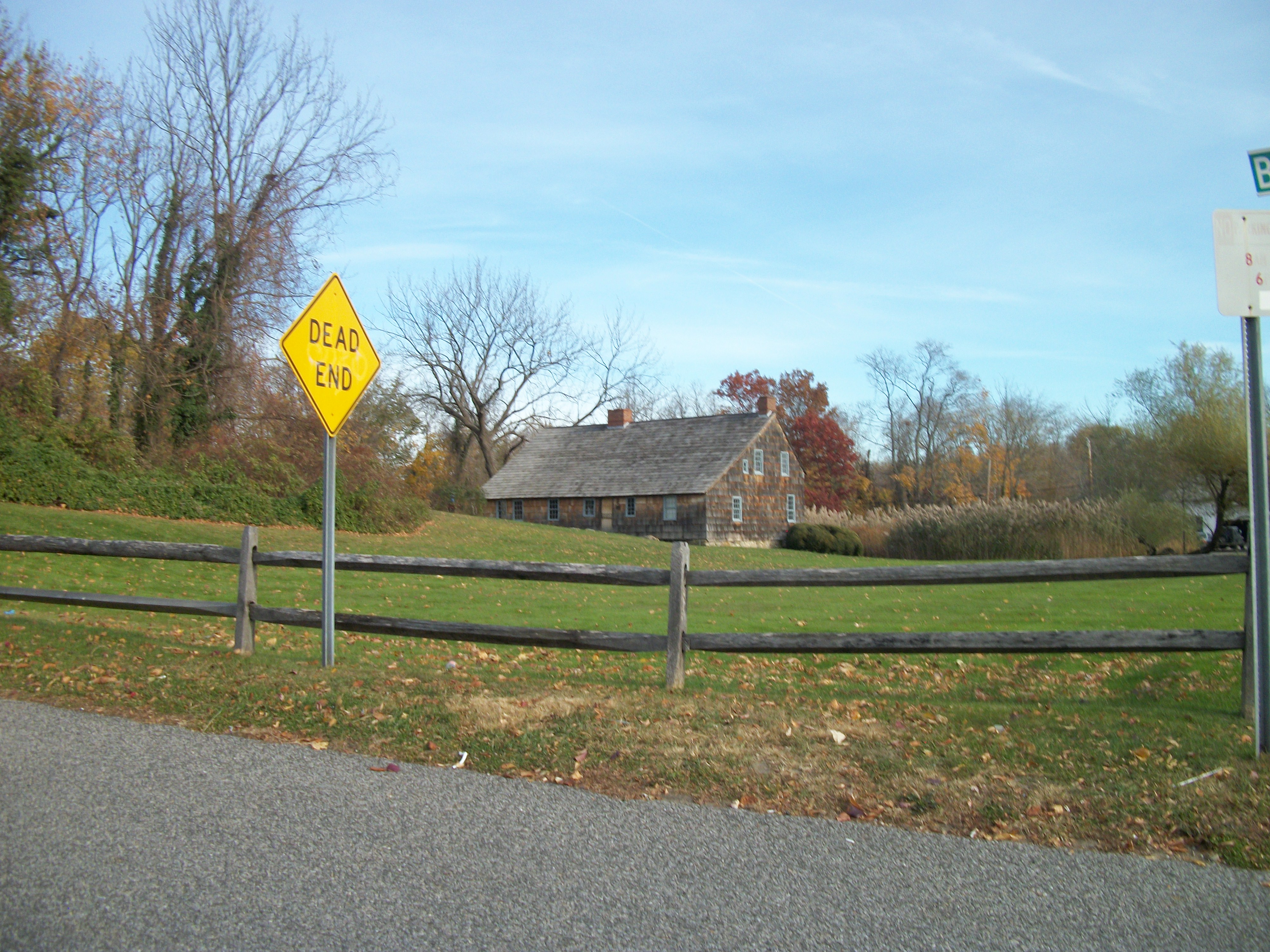
- Brewster House as seen from Brewster Lane

- Location within New York Location within the United States
- Location: Jct. of NY 25A & Runs Rd., East Setauket, New York
- Coordinates: 40°56′36.2″N 73°6′10.4″W
- Architectural style: Colonial
- NRHP reference No.: 08000109
- Added to NRHP: February 28, 2008

The Brewster House in East Setauket, New York was listed on the National Register of Historic Places in 2008. The house was originally built in 1665 and expanded in the early 18th century. It was restored in 1968 to match the 1845 painting of "Long Island Farmhouses" by William Sidney Mount. The site is currently owned by the Ward Melville Heritage Organization.
