= Setauket, New York =

- Hamlet and Census-designated place
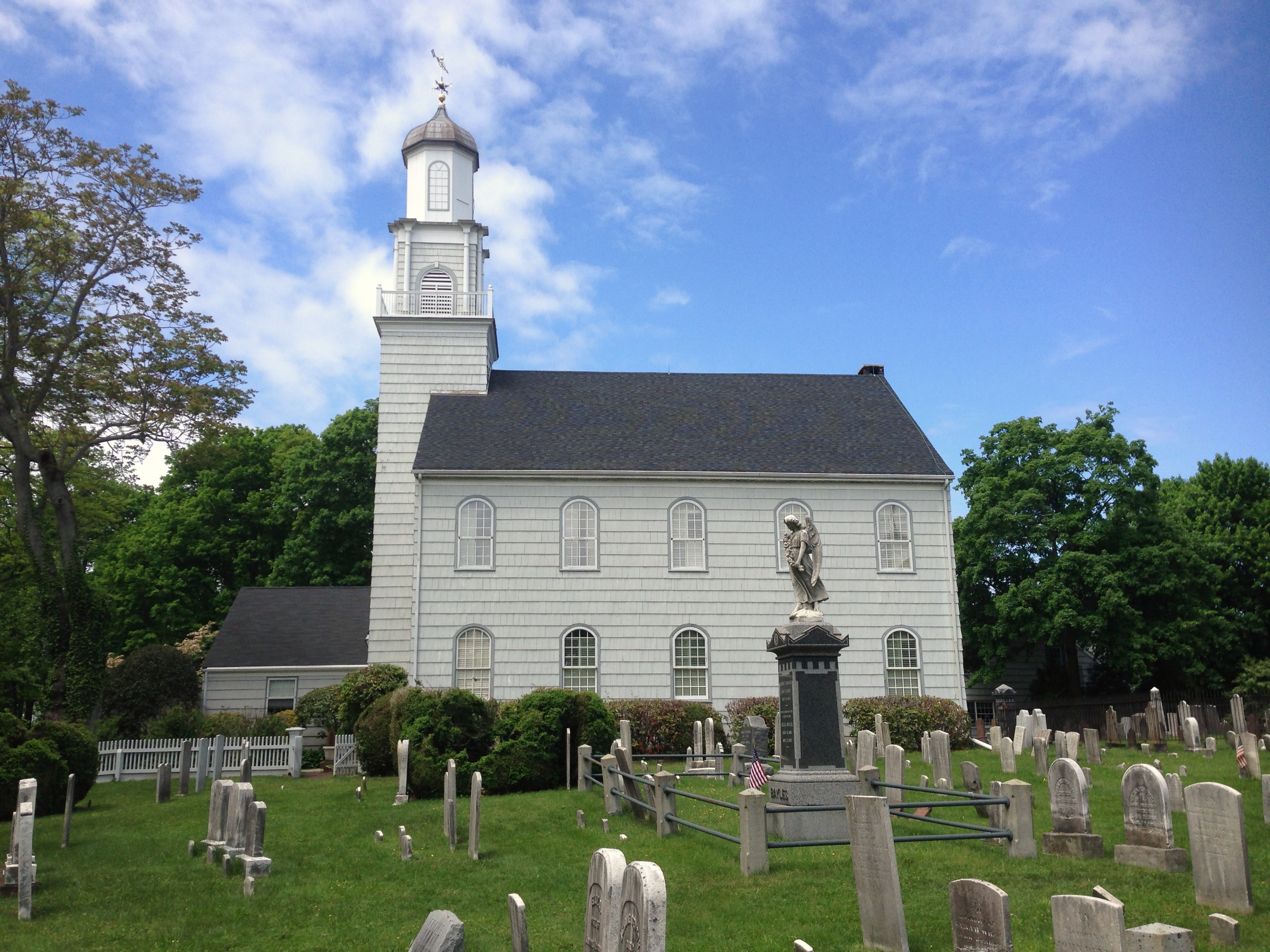
- The Setauket Presbyterian Church and Burial Ground, with the graveyard dating to the 1660s and the structure to 1812

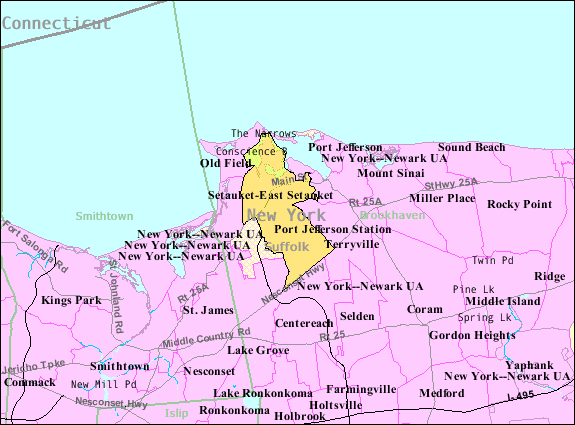

- Location within Long Island Location within New York
- Coordinates: 40°56′47″N 73°6′41″W
- Country: United States
- State: New York
- County: Suffolk
- Town: Brookhaven

Area
  - Total: 3.28 sq mi (8.49 km^{2})
  - Land: 2.52 sq mi (6.52 km^{2})
  - Water: 0.76 sq mi (1.97 km^{2})

Population (2020)
  - Total: 3,986
  - Density: 1,582.9/sq mi (611.18/km^{2})
- Time zone: UTC−05:00 (ET)
  - Summer (DST): UTC−04:00
- ZIP Code: 11733
- Area codes: 631, 934
- FIPS code: 36-66465

Setauket /səˈtɔːkɪt/ is a hamlet and census-designated place (CDP) in the Town of Brookhaven, Suffolk County, New York, United States, on the North Shore of Long Island. As of the 2020 census, Setauket had a population of 3,986.

Setauket was founded in 1655, the first settlement in what would become the town of Brookhaven. Before the 2020 census, the community was part of the Setauket-East Setauket CDP. The area was split in 2020 into two separate CDPs: Setauket and East Setauket despite many in the community still considering it one locality.

Setauket was founded as an agricultural community in the mid-17th century, and was a regional center of activity during the American Revolutionary War, noted for the Culper spy ring and the Battle of Setauket. Many of Setauket's early structures are intact and now form the Old Setauket Historic District. The Setaukets remain a mostly residential area, while bordering the more commercial enclaves of Port Jefferson and Stony Brook. The handful of businesses within the community largely cater to the over 25,000 students of Stony Brook University, which is adjacent to the CDP.

== History ==
=== Origins ===
The name "Setauket" is derived from the historic Algonquian-speaking Setalcott Indians, who had lived in the area before its colonial period.

In 1655, a handful of land-speculating colonists orchestrated the purchase of the Setauket area from the local natives. The region's first European settlers were English migrants from New England. This was the first settlement in what later became the town of Brookhaven, and both the hamlet and town use the 1655 date as their origin. During the 17th century, Setauket was synonymous with the colonial town of Brookhaven.

During the 1660s, the settlement was temporarily renamed "Ashford". This change was facilitated by Captain John Scott, a professional mercenary hired to clear out the Native American Indians. He was an early settler of Setauket and an important leader in Long Island's early history who briefly served under the title of "President of Long Island". A crafty land speculator, Scott claimed at one point to own a third of the island, including the Setauket area. Despite the questionable nature of many of his claims, John Scott had enough power and support to rename Setauket for his ancestral homeland in England, Ashford, Kent, and to construct a stately home named Egerton.

John Woolman, a well-known preacher and journalist, noted having attended a Quaker meeting at "Setawket" in the spring of 1747.

=== American Revolution ===
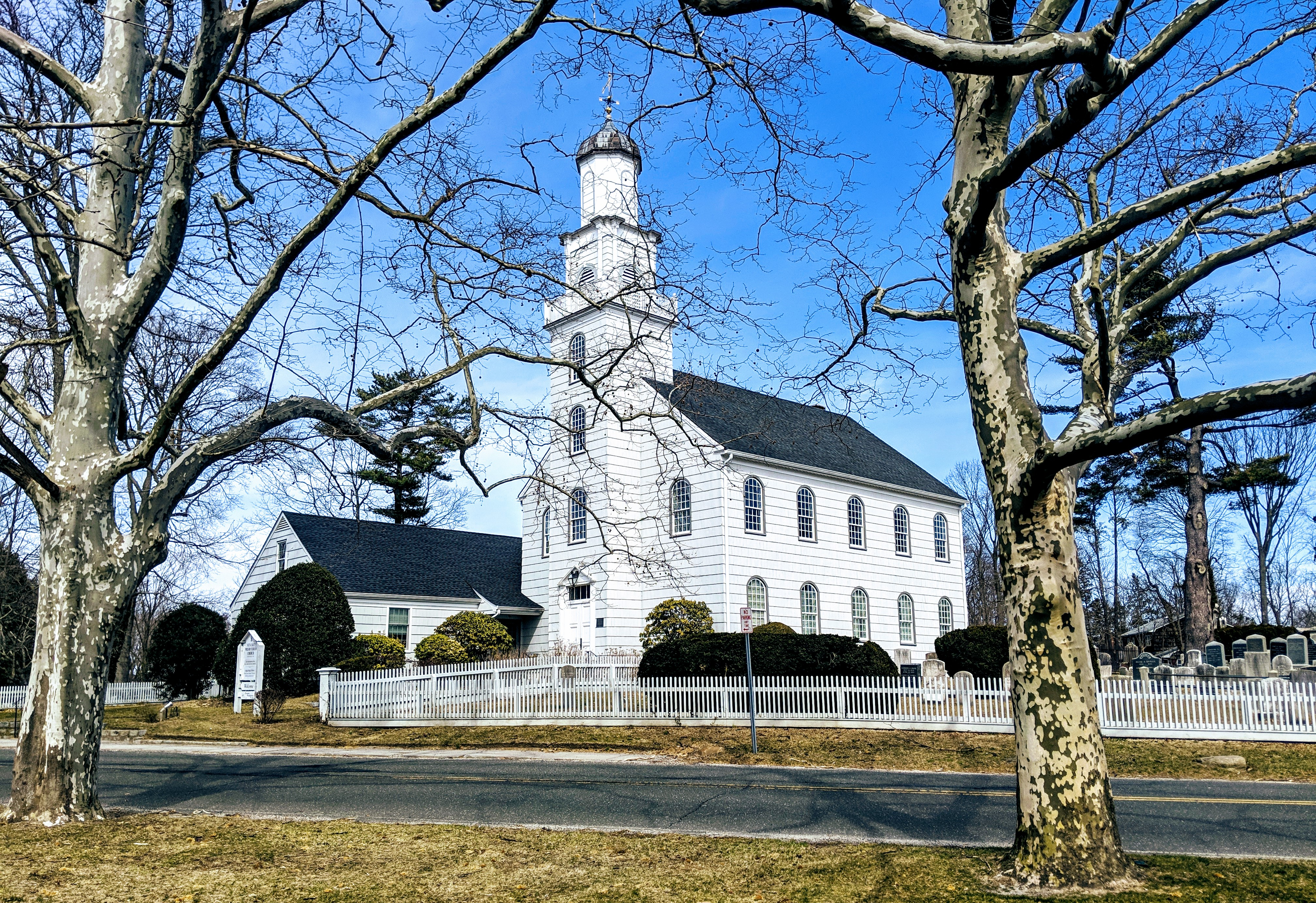
Presbyterian Church-Setauket

In the American Revolutionary War, the 1777 Battle of Setauket was fought on the village green. At the time, Loyalists controlled Setauket and had fortified the Presbyterian church for use as their stronghold. A Patriot force led by General Samuel Holden Parsons sailed across Long Island Sound from Fairfield, Connecticut, proposing to attack the Loyalists. Three hours of gunfire ensued before Parsons withdrew and returned to Connecticut, with minimal casualties for either side. During the gunfight, Parsons' men took cover behind "Patriots' Rock", which remains near the village green with a commemorative plaque. Because of this rock's massive size, it provided more than sufficient cover for the soldiers. Some of the bullets were embedded in the walls of the extant Caroline Church of Brookhaven.

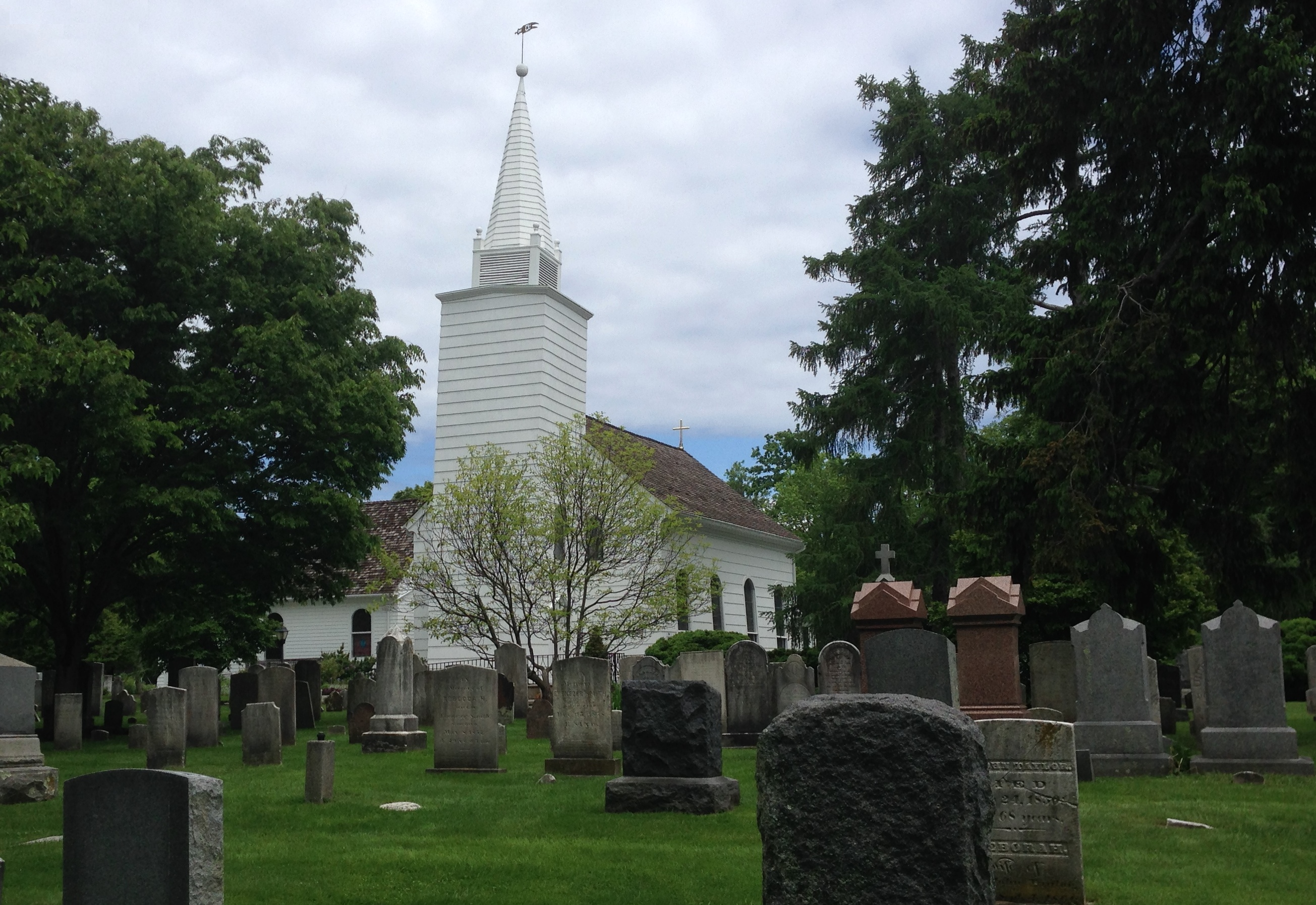
The Caroline Church of Brookhaven, built 1729, is the oldest extant church in Suffolk County.

From 1778 to 1781, the Culper Spy Ring passed information about British troop movements gathered in New York City to George Washington. The spy ring consisted primarily of Setauket residents, including its leader Benjamin Tallmadge and key agent Abraham Woodhull. The Culper ring was highly successful and alerted Washington to such plots as a surprise attack on the newly allied French forces, a scheme to counterfeit Continental currency, and the secret defection of a general in the Continental Army (afterwards known to be Benedict Arnold). Washington later spent a night in Setauket during his 1790 tour of Long Island.

During the British occupation, residents held religious services at the c.1729 Caroline Church (Episcopal) while occupational troops used the Setauket Presbyterian Church. The pulpit of the Presbyterian church was destroyed, and several gravestones from the surrounding cemetery were moved as part of the fortifications. Services resumed after the war until lightning hit the church in 1812. The Presbyterian church was rebuilt in 1812. The village green continues to be owned by both churches.

=== Modern history ===
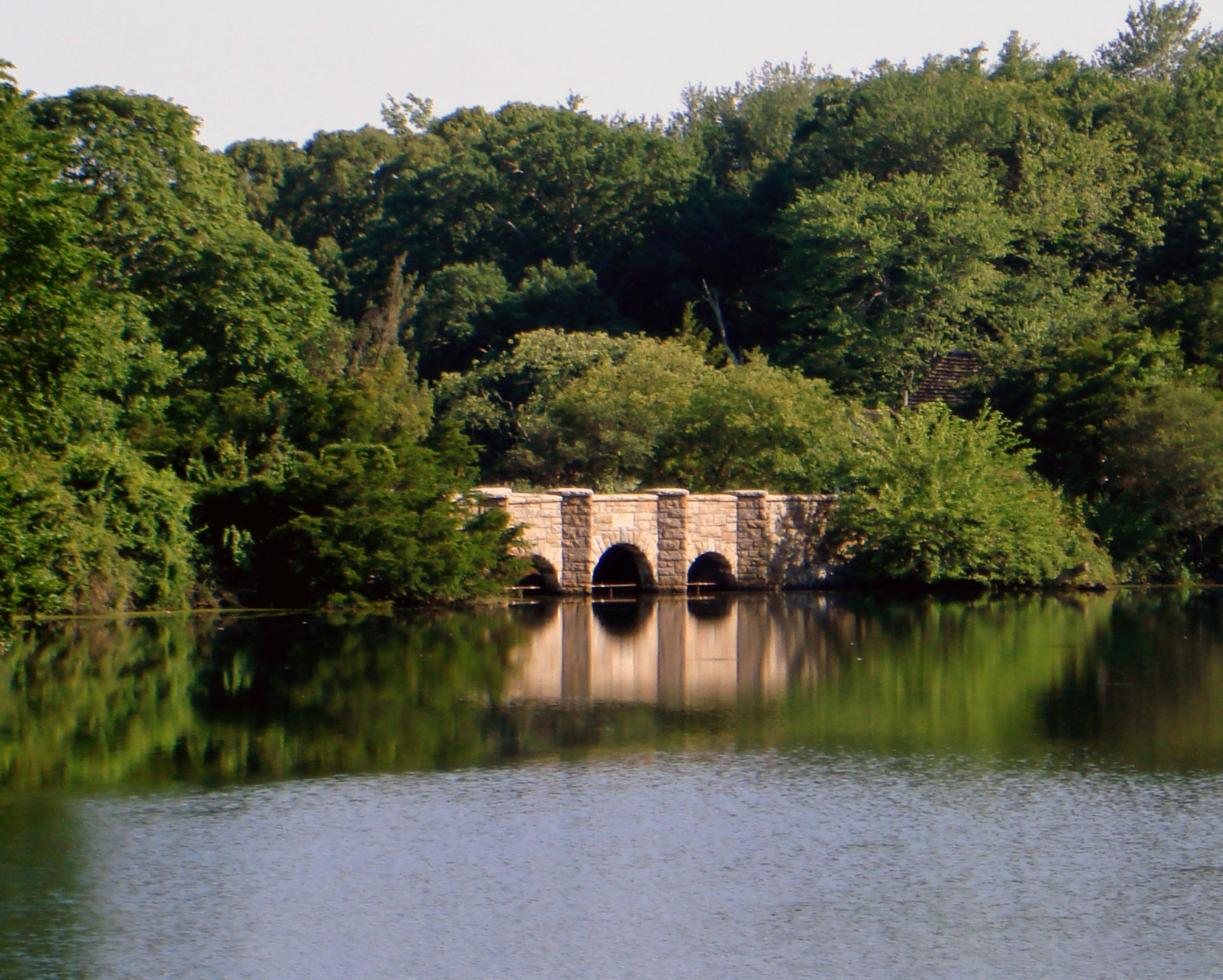
The Setauket Mill Pond

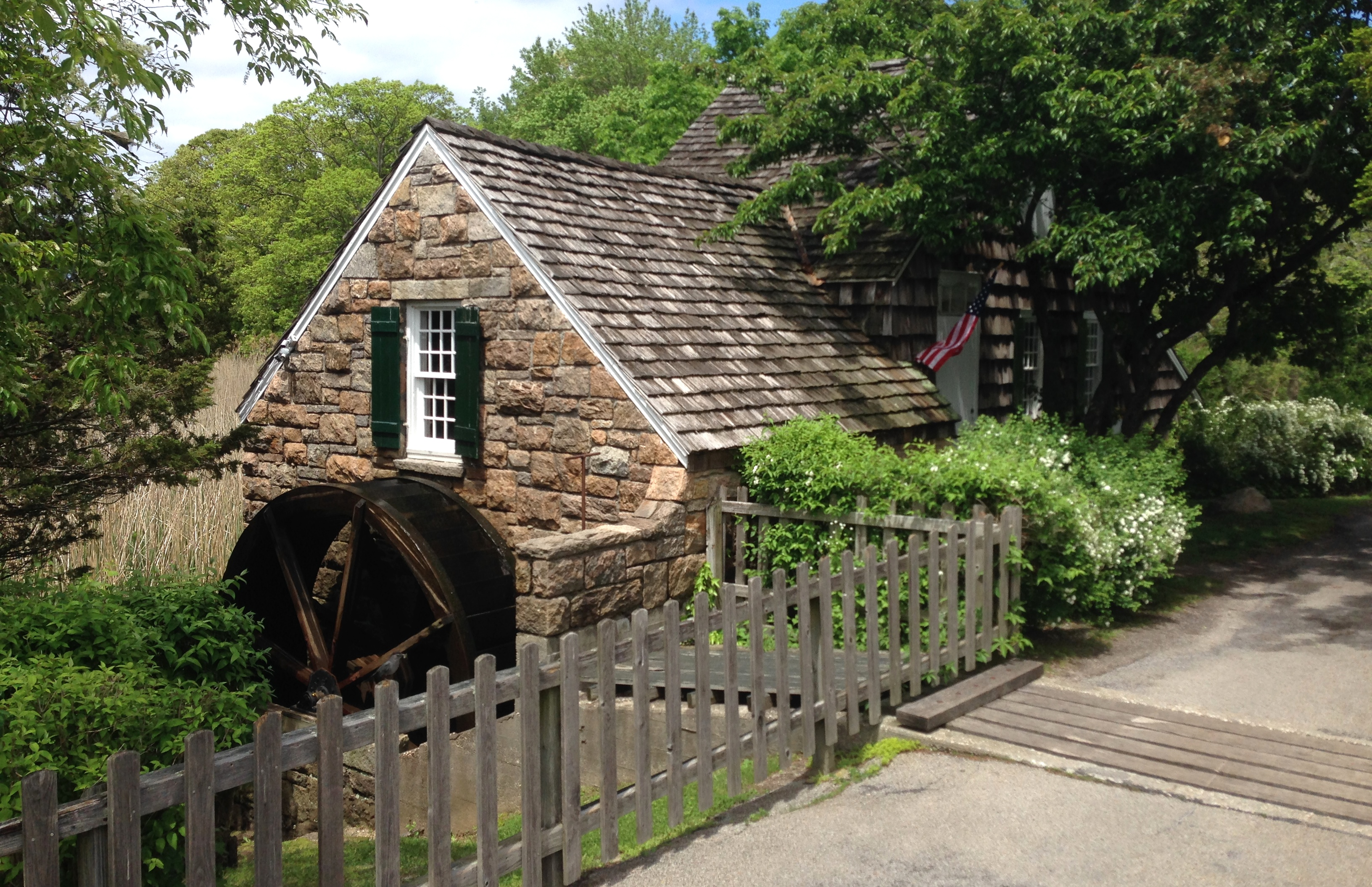
Setauket Mill, a 1937 replica based on earlier structures

The 19th century brought industry to East Setauket. Shipbuilding, which had begun as early as 1662, prospered as new shipyards populated the section of Setauket Harbor known as Dyers Neck. These supplemented larger operations in neighboring Port Jefferson. Among the vessels built at Setauket were the Adorna in 1870 by David Brewster Bayles, which was the largest square-rigged sailing ship built on Long Island outside of Brooklyn. (At that time, Brooklyn was considered part of Long Island, and the largest sailing vessel built at Port Jefferson, the Martha E. Wallace of 1902, was a schooner.) A likeness of the Adorna has pride of place today above the main entrance of Setauket's elementary school. Better known is the famous, or infamous, schooner yacht Wanderer built at Setauket in 1857 by William J. Rowland at the direction of Captain Thomas B. Hawkins, who would later command her. The Wanderer was sold to new owners after her first cruise, and they tried to have the vessel secretly converted into a slaver at Port Jefferson in 1858, largely employing outsiders. Suspicious residents alerted authorities, and the vessel was captured by the USRC Harriet Lane off Port Jefferson as it attempted a hasty departure. Sadly, authorities in New York returned the vessel to its owners, and she later completed what is considered the last successful American slaving voyage to Africa. She did so without Captain Hawkins, who quit before the vessel was released. What is less well known is that the Wanderer later served in the Union Navy during the Civil War as the USS Wanderer and captured two small blockade runners. From 1876 until 1904, East Setauket also ran a rubber factory for the Long Island Rubber Company. By the early 20th century, nearly all industrial activity within the Setaukets had ceased.

Following the 1873 completion of railroad service from New York City to Port Jefferson, the Setaukets began functioning as a summer resort town. Into the mid-20th century, relatively wealthy families started settling in the non-industrialized sections of the Setauket waterfront.

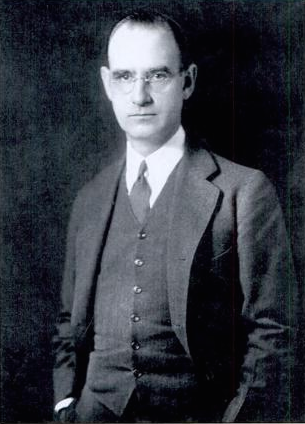
The influential philanthropist Ward Melville

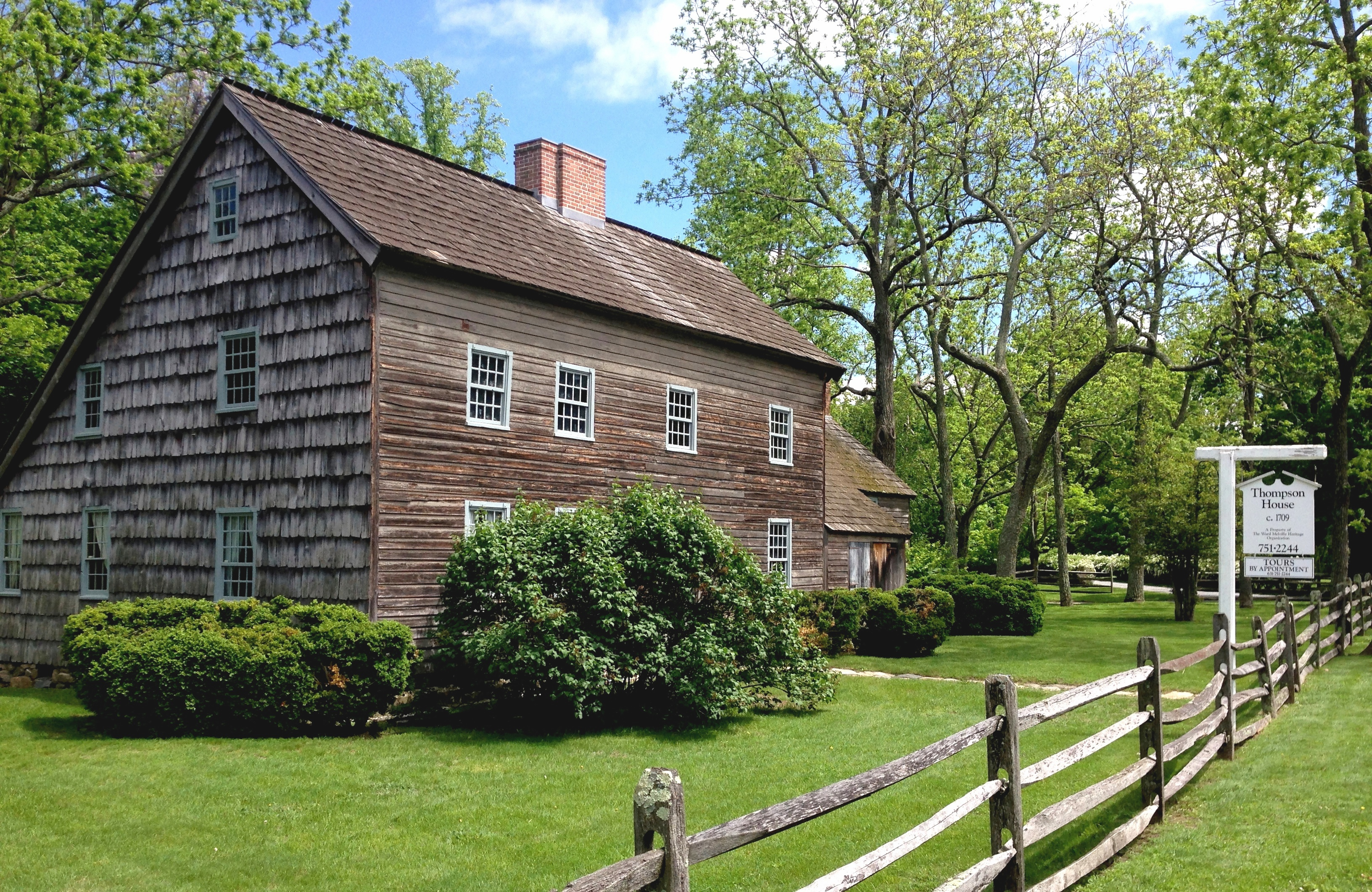
The c. 1709 Thompson House housed five generations of farmers and doctors before it was bought and restored by philanthropist Ward Melville.

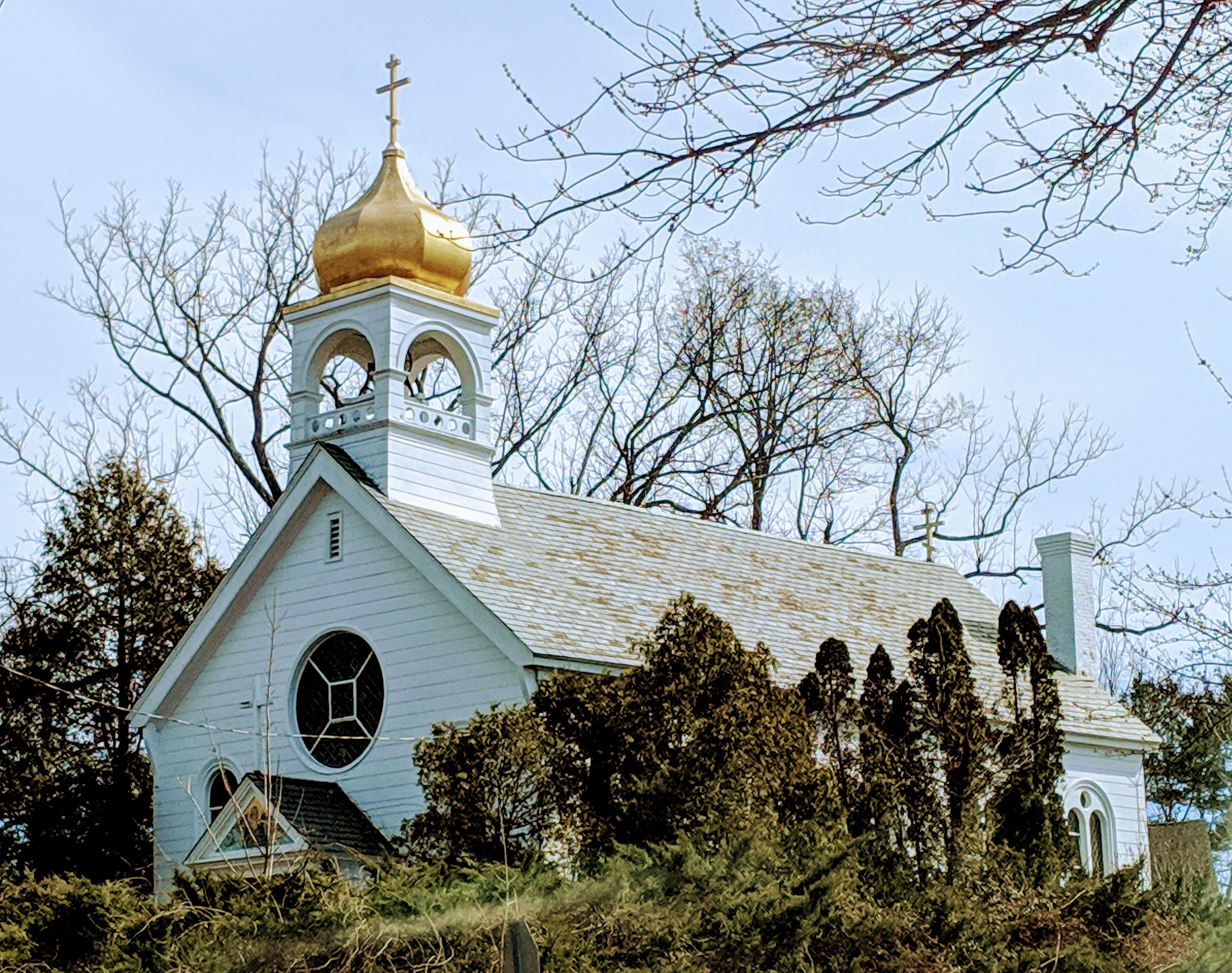
The Greek Orthodox Monastery of the Holy Cross

In the post-World War II era, Setauket experienced a population boom, as the remaining agricultural lots were filled in with residential developments. The Old Setauket Historic District was established to counteract this change, and a sizeable proportion of Setauket's housing stock continues to be pre-war. Extant historical homes include the 1709 Thompson House and the 1830 Sherwood-Jayne Museum. The Frank Melville Memorial Park was established in 1937 and preserves much of the land around the Setauket Mill Pond.

The Setaukets were also influenced by the philanthropy of Ward Melville, owner of what would become CVS Corporation, throughout the Three Village area. Melville founded Stony Brook University, the campus of which abuts the Setaukets on their western side. A minority of the university's students and faculty now live in the Setaukets. Melville also created a New England–style village district in neighbouring Stony Brook, being the closest commercial hub to Setauket's western areas and complementing the role of Port Jefferson to the east.

In 2012, local politicians formed a planning committee for the section of New York State Route 25A bordering Stony Brook University, shared between Setauket and Stony Brook. Much of this corridor is currently underused, with a handful of businesses in small strip malls. The concept is to create a more walkable downtown area that may attract business from students and long-term residents alike.

In May 2014, a 3.5-mile (5.6 km) bicycle path known as the Greenway Trail opened, connecting Setauket and Port Jefferson Station. Plans are being made to further expand the bicycle route to Wading River by converting defunct railroad tracks.

The Greek Orthodox Monastery of the Holy Cross, headquarters of the Jerusalem Patriarchate in America, is located in Setauket.

== Geography ==
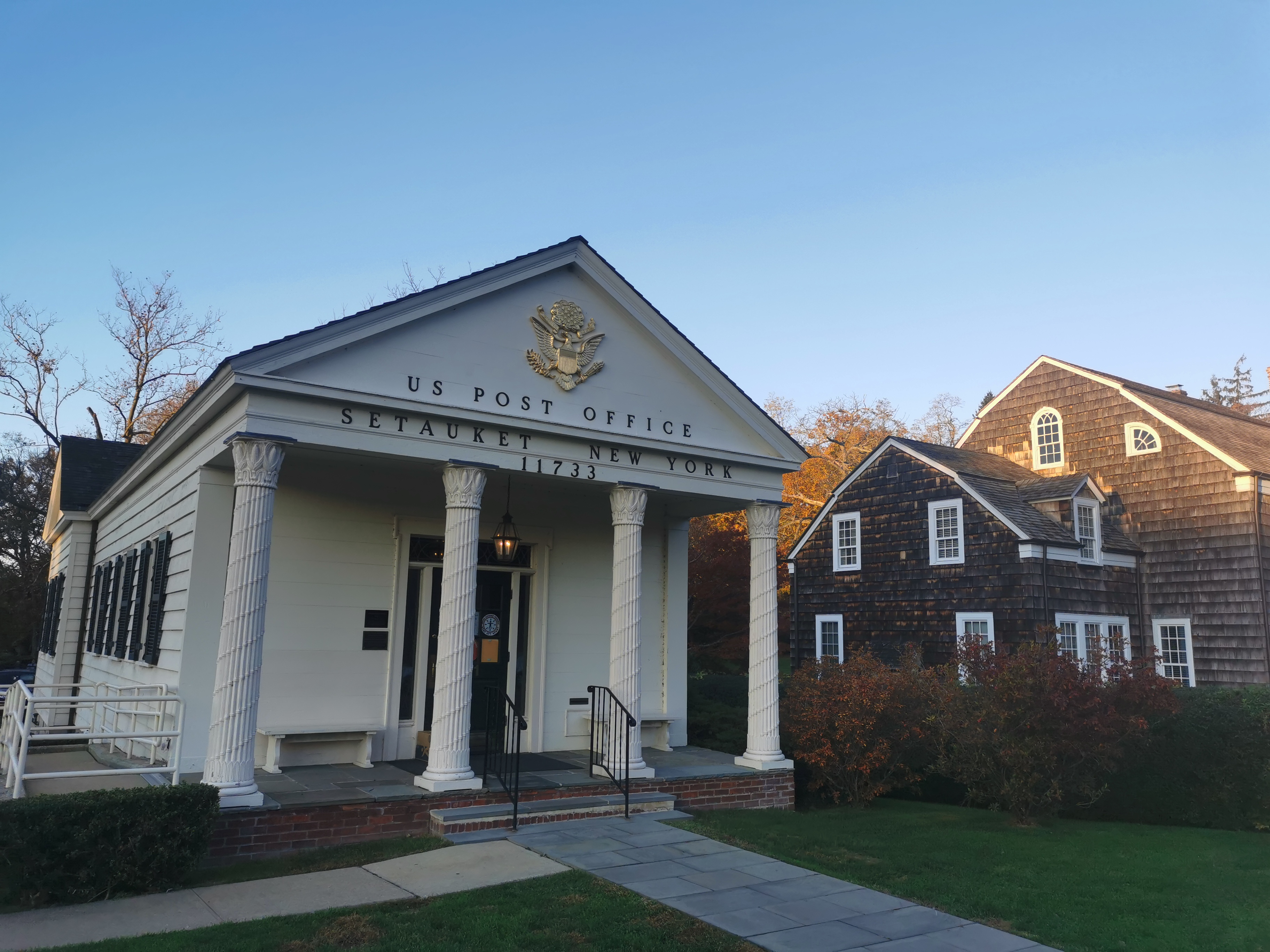
The post office of Setauket

Setauket is located in the northwest part of the town of Brookhaven at 40°56′47″N 73°6′41″W. It is on the North Shore of Long Island and includes parts of two tidal inlets: Setauket Harbor and Conscience Bay, both of which are arms of Port Jefferson Harbor leading to Long Island Sound. The Setauket CDP is bordered to the north and west by the village of Old Field, to the northwest/southwest by Stony Brook, to the south by Stony Brook University, to the southeast by East Setauket, to the east by the village of Poquott, and to the northeast by Port Jefferson Harbor. According to the United States Census Bureau, the CDP has a total area of 3.3 square miles (8.5 km^{2}), of which 2.5 square miles (6.5 km^{2}) are land and 0.8 square miles (2.0 km^{2}), or 23.2%, are water.

Setauket has a New England–style village green with a mill pond and park, a small post office, the Caroline Church built in 1729, and the Setauket Presbyterian Church, established in 1660. The Emma S. Clark Library, also on the village green, is often considered one of the most comprehensive on Long Island. This section is the historical center of the original settlement and forms the core of the Old Setauket historic district. The mill pond is additionally within the public Frank Melville Memorial Park.

New York State Route 25A is the main east–west road, connecting Port Jefferson and Stony Brook. Setauket is accessible from the Long Island Expressway via Exit 62 and Nicolls Road.

Almost all of the commercial establishments in the Setaukets are concentrated along Route 25A. Additional commercial zones exist in neighboring East Setauket along Belle Meade Road (formerly called Terminal Road after the oil terminal) and on Nesconset Highway. Numerous medical and professional offices are located on Belle Meade Road, along with other businesses that service them. A few additional shops and factories were established before modern zoning rules went into effect, a handful of which are located on Gnarled Hollow Road and Comsewogue Road in East Setauket. The remainder of Setauket is predominantly residential woodland.

"The Setaukets" or simply "Setauket" refers to a broad area between Old Field and the harbors of Stony Brook and Port Jefferson, including suburban developments East of Stony Brook University. As such, they comprise all of Setauket and East Setauket, as well as Strong's Neck, Poquott, Western Port Jefferson Station, East Setauket, and South Setauket. The Setaukets, Old Field, and Stony Brook combine to form the "Three Village" area, a region served by the Three Village Central School District.

== Demographics ==
Historical population
Census	Pop.	Note	%±
2020	3,986		—
U.S. Decennial Census

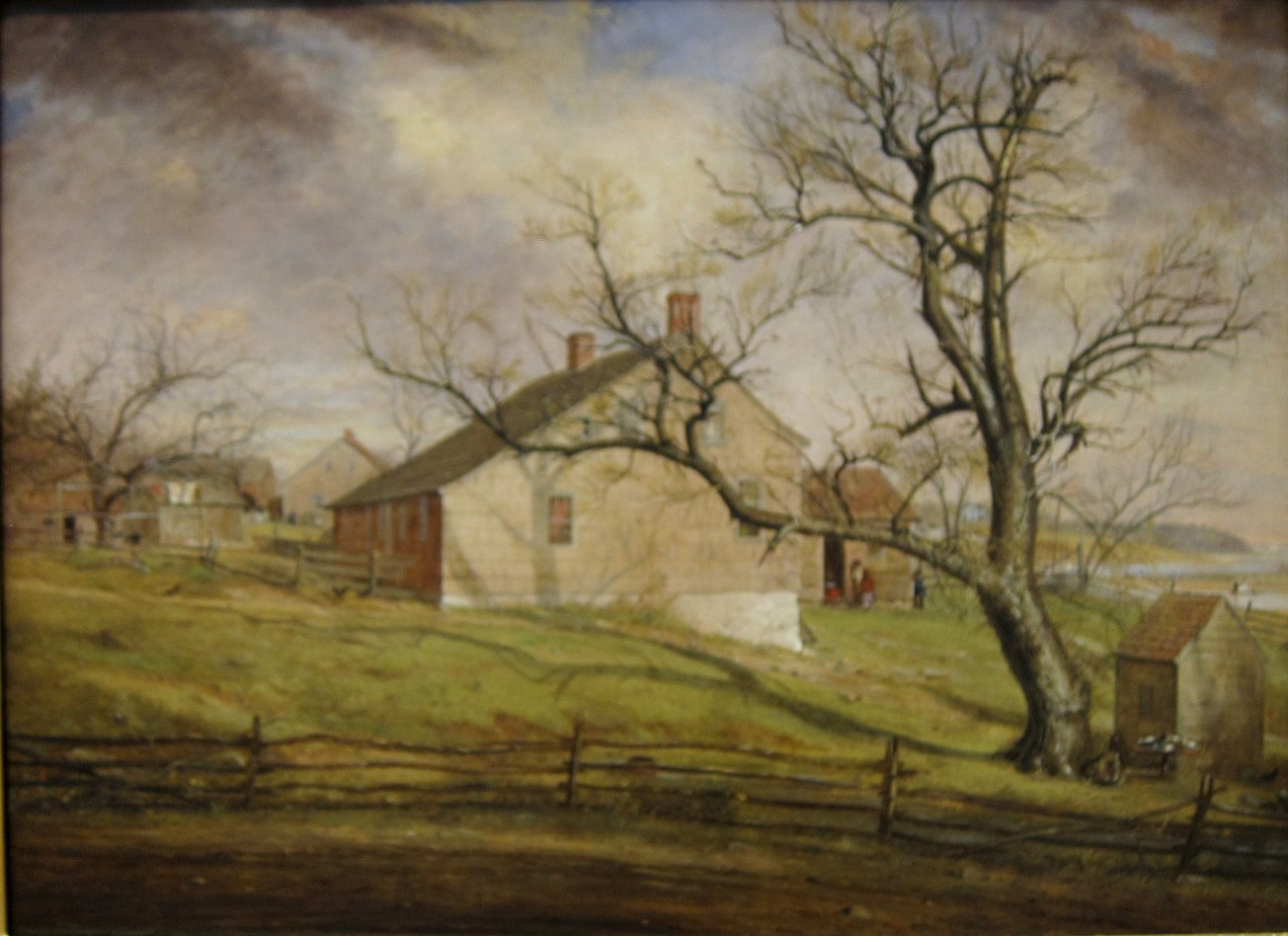
Long Island Farmhouses by William Sidney Mount, featuring the still-standing 1665 Brewster House

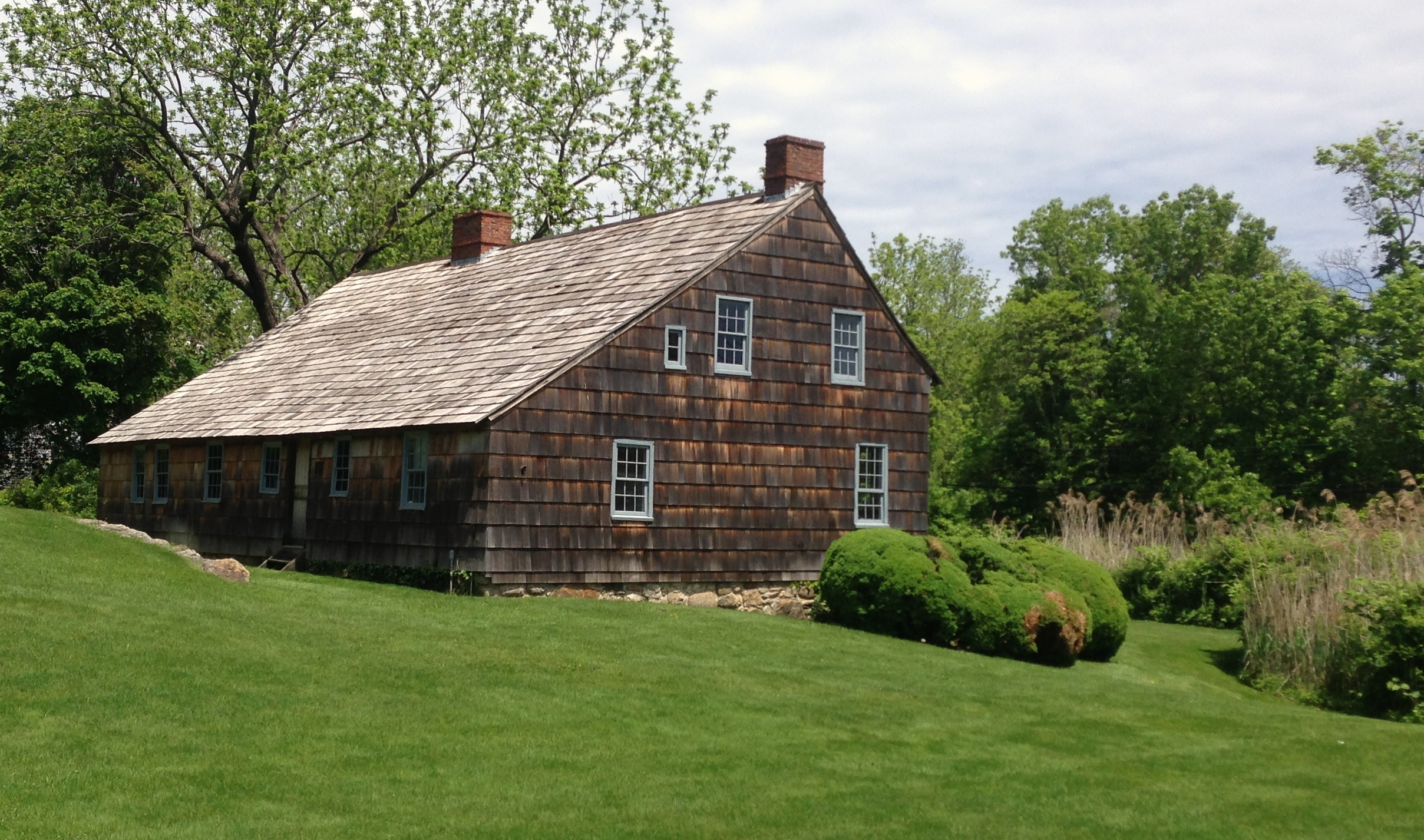
The c. 1665 Brewster House is the oldest existing structure in the Town of Brookhaven. During the Revolutionary War, it housed a tavern where British occupiers were entertained.

=== 2020 census ===
As of the 2020 census, Setauket had a population of 3,986. The median age was 47.4 years. 19.3% of residents were under the age of 18 and 23.1% of residents were 65 years of age or older. For every 100 females there were 97.2 males, and for every 100 females age 18 and over there were 95.7 males age 18 and over.

100.0% of residents lived in urban areas, while 0.0% lived in rural areas.

There were 1,413 households in Setauket, of which 30.0% had children under the age of 18 living in them. Of all households, 66.7% were married-couple households, 11.4% were households with a male householder and no spouse or partner present, and 19.2% were households with a female householder and no spouse or partner present. About 16.9% of all households were made up of individuals and 10.1% had someone living alone who was 65 years of age or older.

There were 1,531 housing units, of which 7.7% were vacant. The homeowner vacancy rate was 1.6% and the rental vacancy rate was 8.9%.

Racial composition as of the 2020 census
Race	Number	Percent
White	3,201	80.3%
Black or African American	70	1.8%
American Indian and Alaska Native	1	0.0%
Asian	348	8.7%
Native Hawaiian and Other Pacific Islander	2	0.1%
Some other race	47	1.2%
Two or more races	317	8.0%
Hispanic or Latino (of any race)	257	6.4%

=== 2000 census ===
As of the census of 2000, there were 15,931 people, 5,521 households, and 4,289 families residing in the Setauket-East Setauket CDP. The population density was 1,882.3 inhabitants per square mile (726.8/km^{2}). There were 5,632 housing units at an average density of 665.4 per square mile (256.9/km^{2}). The racial makeup of the CDP was 87.76% White, 1.27% African American, 0.17% Native American, 8.80% Asian, 0.04% Pacific Islander, 0.61% from other races, and 1.35% from two or more races. Hispanic or Latino of any race were 9.43% of the population.

There were 5,589 households, out of which 39.2% had children under the age of 18 living with them, 68.6% were married couples living together, 6.8% had a female householder with no husband present, and 22.3% were non-families. 17.2% of all households were made up of individuals, and 4.7% had someone living alone who was 65 years of age or older. The average household size was 2.88, and the average family size was 3.26.

In the CDP, the population was spread out, with 26.9% under the age of 18, 7.3% from 18 to 24, 29.3% from 25 to 44, 27.2% from 45 to 64, and 9.4% who were 65 years of age or older. The median age was 37 years. For every 100 females, there were 96.7 males. For every 100 females age 18 and over, there were 94.5 males.

=== Income and poverty ===
The median income for a household in the CDP was $200,690, and the median income for a family was $225,160 in 2022. The per capita income for the CDP was $69,400. About 0.9% of families and 1.0% of the population were below the poverty line, including 0.8% of those under age 18 and 0.3% of those age 65 or over.

== In popular culture ==
Setauket is the principal setting of the AMC television drama Turn: Washington's Spies, which premiered in 2014 and tells the story of the Culper Ring.

== Education ==
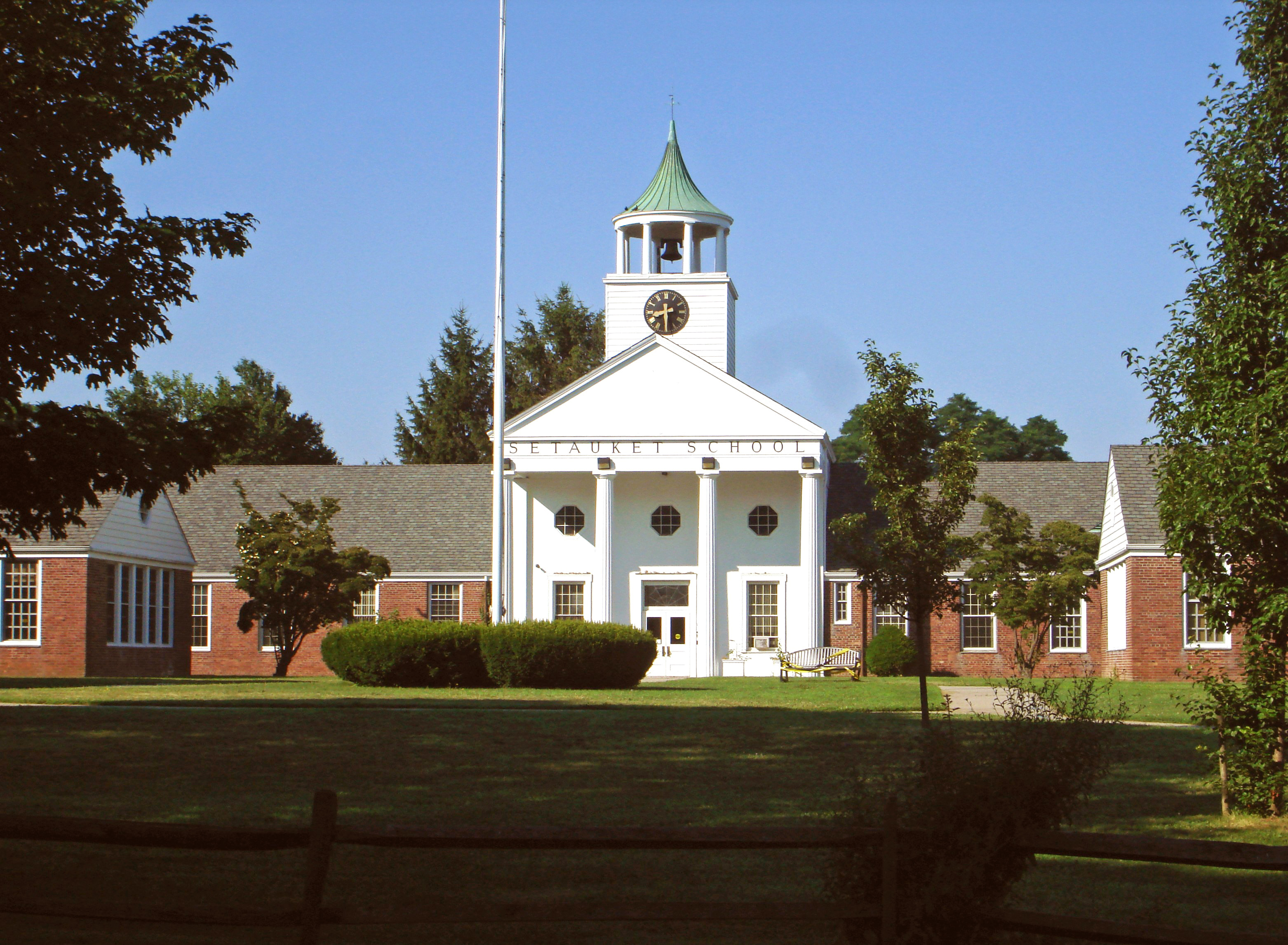
Setauket Elementary School

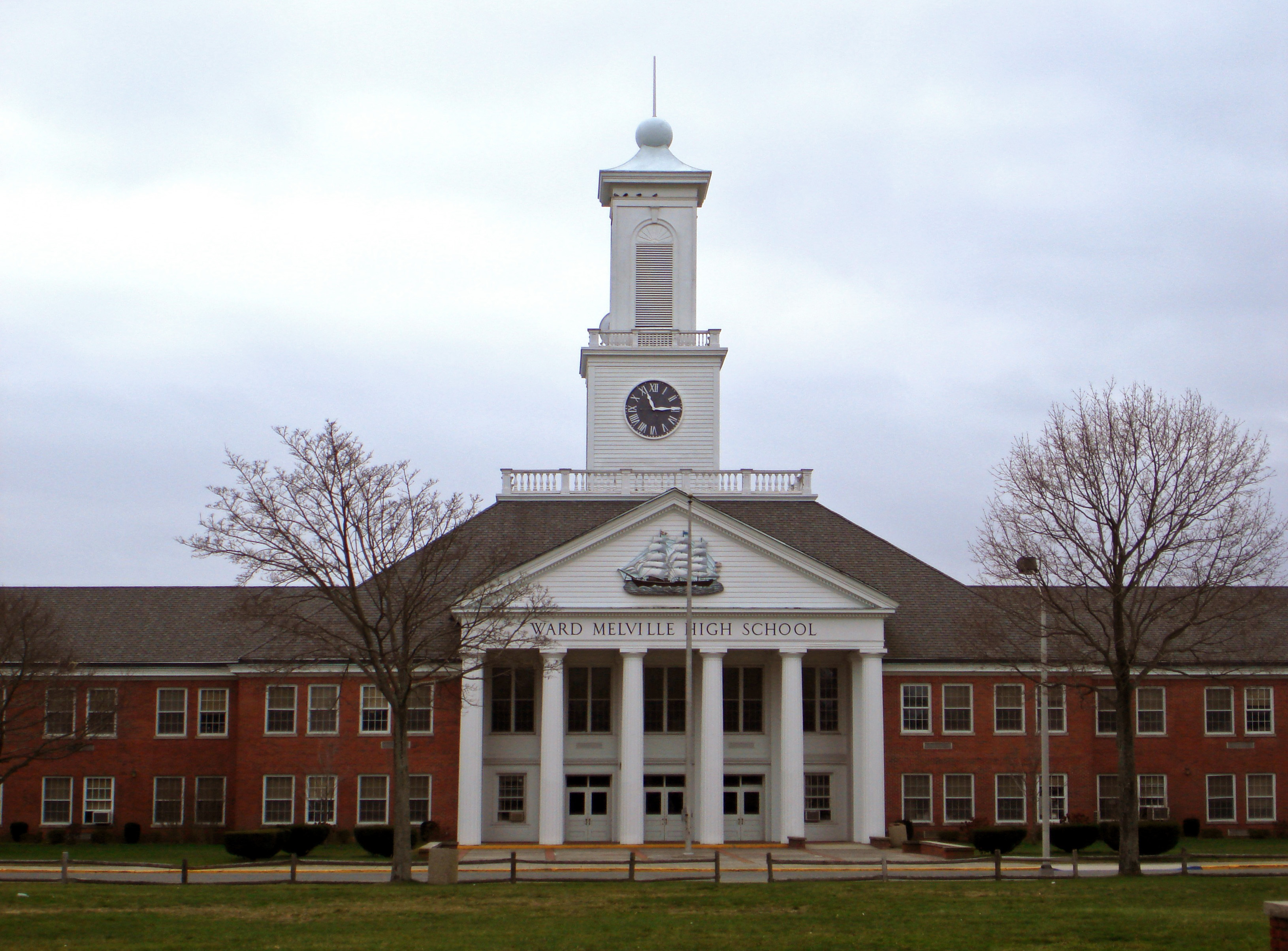
Ward Melville High School

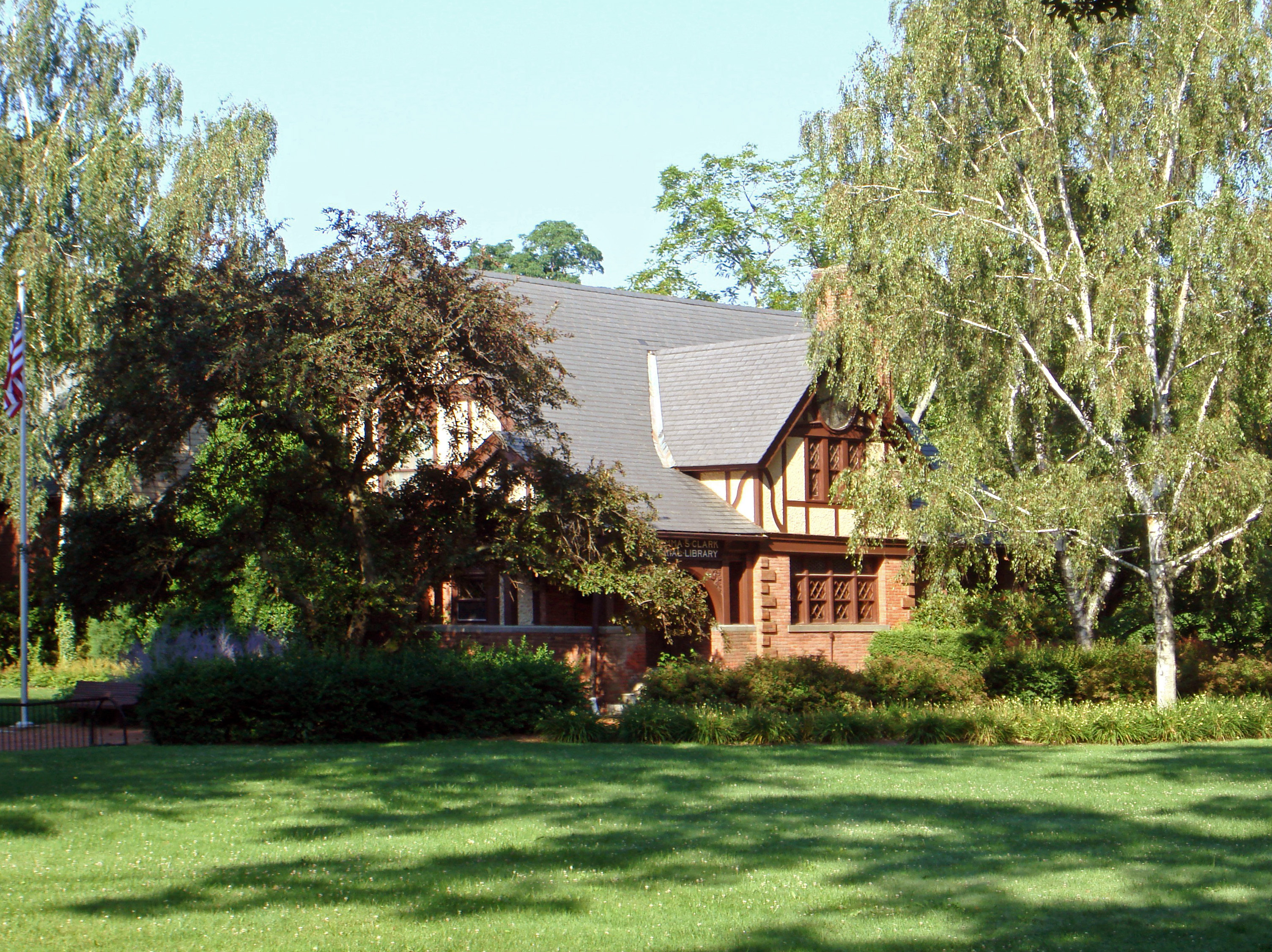
The Emma S. Clark Public Library

The Three Village Central School District serves the Setauket community.

- Arrowhead Elementary School
- Minnesauke Elementary School – Setauket Indian word for "Little Neck", the name for what is now known as Strong's Neck.
- Nassakeag Elementary School
- Setauket Elementary School
- William Sidney Mount Elementary School – named after a local 19th-century artist known for his portrayals of everyday life.
- Murphy Junior High School – named after Robert C. Murphy, a local naturalist.
- Paul J. Gelinas Junior High School – named after Paul J. Gelinas, the first district superintendent.
- Ward Melville High School – named after the local philanthropist who donated land for the school. It is renowned nationally for its InSTAR science research program, which produces a high number of Intel semi-finalists for the Regeneron Science Talent Search. The school also has a regional reputation for its lacrosse team. Above the main entrance, the school features a likeness of the Adorna, the largest sailing vessel built in Setauket.
- Christian Avenue School – Original buildings dating back from earlier part of the 20th century. Used for Kindergarten and 1st grade before closing in the late 1970s. Demolished and redeveloped as residential homes in the 1990s.
- North Country School – Former elementary school, closed in the 1980s. Some of the district's administrative offices are located there as well as rented to BOCES.
- Emma S. Clark Library
- The Stony Brook School (private)
- Torah Tots, Chabad Hebrew school

== Media ==
- Newsday (daily)
- Stony Brook Press (Stony Brook University)
- The Statesman (Stony Brook University)
- The Village Times Herald (weekly)

== Notable people ==
- Bülent Arel (1919–1990), composer
- Caleb Brewster (1747–1827), member of America's Culper Ring
- William de Leftwich Dodge (1867–1935), muralist
- Louis Edmonds, Broadway and TV actor
- Mick Foley (born 1965), professional wrestler
- Harry Gideonse (1901–1985), president of Brooklyn College, and chancellor of The New School for Social Research
- Kristen Gilbert, serial killer
- Steven Matz (born 1991), left-handed pitcher for the St. Louis Cardinals
- Ward Melville (1887–1977), businessman and local philanthropist
- William Sydney Mount (1807–1868), painter
- Joseph Reboli (1945–2004), painter
- Lauren Miller Rogen, actress and screenwriter
- Todd Sauerbrun, NFL punter
- Ruth Minsky Sender (1926–2024), Holocaust survivor, author
- Dee Snider (born 1955), singer and radio personality
- Alex Sobel (born 2000), basketball player for Hapoel Haifa of the Israeli Basketball Premier League
- Benjamin Tallmadge (1754–1835), military officer and congressman
- Abraham Woodhull (1750–1826), leading spy of America's Culper Ring
