= Strongs Neck, New York =

Hamlet and peninsula in New York, US

Coordinates: 40°57′38″N 73°06′32″W

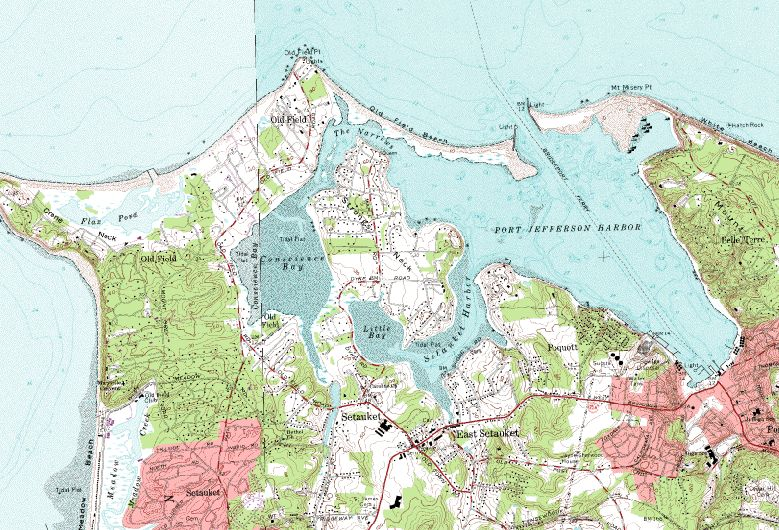
Topographic map of the neck

Strongs Neck is a hamlet and peninsula just south of Long Island Sound and hamlet in Suffolk County, New York, United States, on the North Shore of Long Island.

Strongs Neck is part of the Town of Brookhaven. Census data is included in Setauket-East Setauket, New York.

It was originally known as Little Neck. In the 17th century it was the home of William "Tangier" Smith who, through purchases and land grants, owned most of Brookhaven with property stretching from Shirley on the Atlantic Ocean in the southwest to Riverhead in the northeast as well as all of Fire Island.

Smith's great-granddaughter Anna (who was part of the Setauket Spy Ring during the American Revolution) married Selah Strong and the neck was renamed Strong's Neck. Anna was to coordinate communication among the spies via the color of clothes hung on her clothes line on Strong's Neck.

The Strong family still owns the site of the original Smith mansion and William "Tangier" Smith and many of his progeny are buried there.
