= Emma S. Clark Library =

Library in Suffolk County, NY

- U.S. Historic district – Contributing property
- July 20, 1973
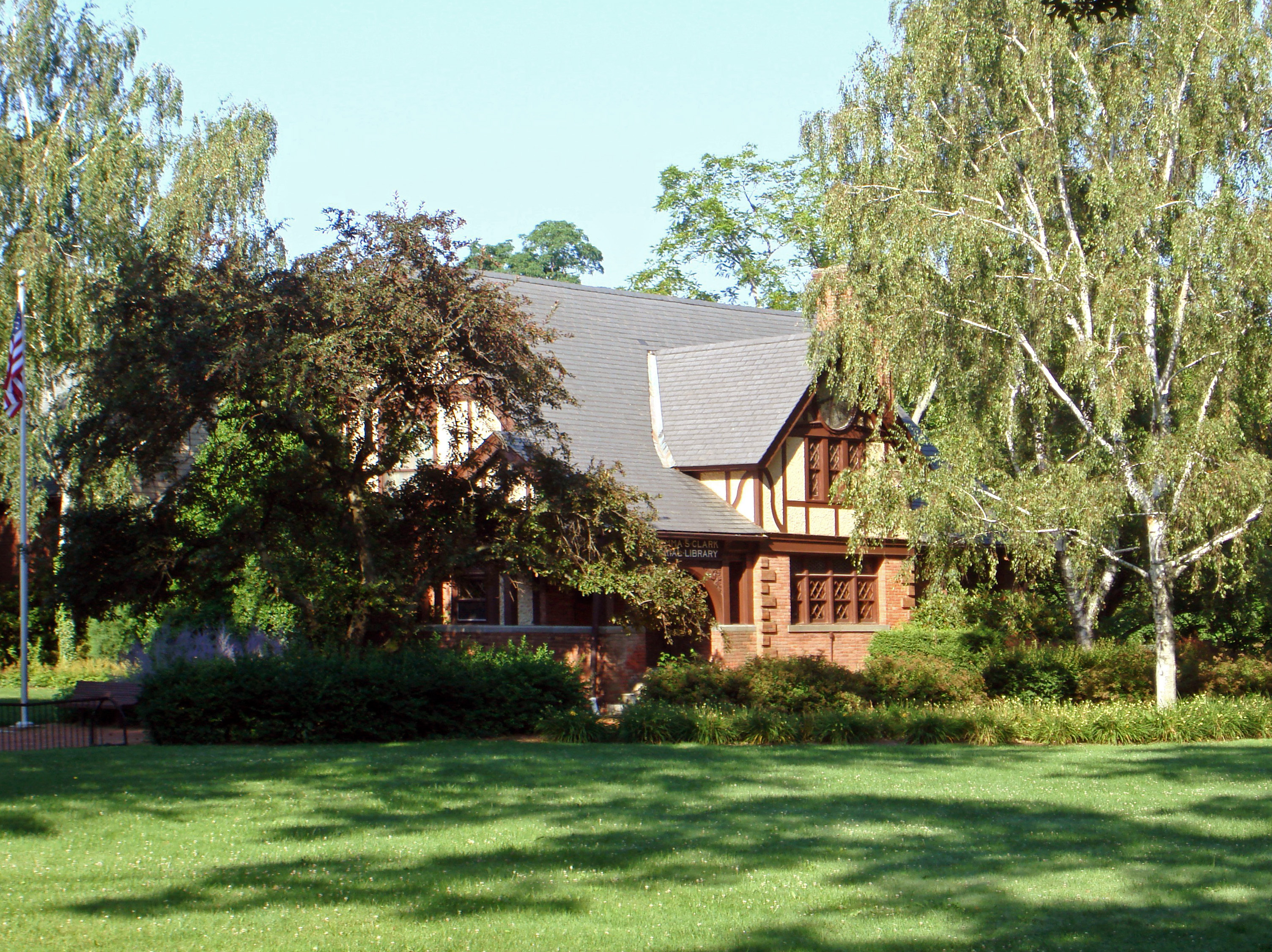
- The library in July 2018

- Location within New York Location within the United States
- Location: 120 Main Street, Setauket, New York
- Coordinates: 40.9449°N 73.1120°W
- Built: 1892
- Architect: Thomas Hodgkins
- Architectural style: Tudor Revival
- Website: https://www.emmaclark.org/
- Part of: Three Village Historic District (ID73001275)
- Added to NRHP: July 20, 1973

The Emma S. Clark Memorial Library Association is a New York State Free Association Library registered by the Regents of the University of the State of New York. It is the oldest public library, in terms of continuous service from its original location. The library has served Suffolk County, New York, since it was built in 1892 by Thomas Hodgkins, its original patron.

It has been in continuous service since then at the location on Main Street across from the Setauket Village Green and was made part of the Three Village Historical District as a contributing structure despite its 19th-century origins. This triangular section is the historical center of the original settlement and forms the core of the Old Setauket Historic District.

== History ==
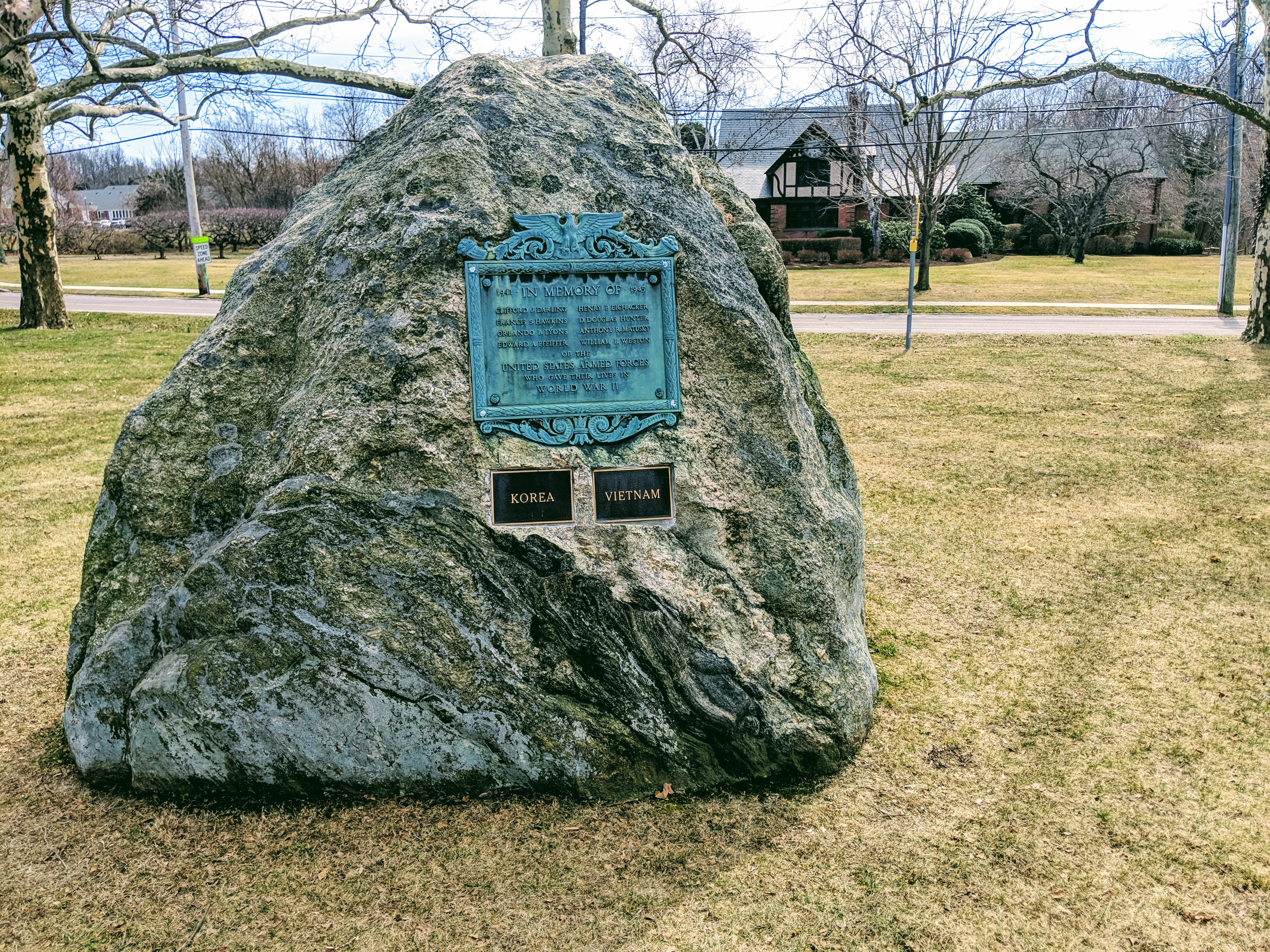
Korean and Vietnam War memorial – East Setauket Village Green.

The gabled structure stands on the nineteenth-century property where Thomas S. Mount, father of genre painter William Sidney Mount, (a contemporary of the Hudson River School painters), had a tavern and general store. The Land grant was deeded from the Setalcott Indians, who inhabited the Setaukets from 3000 B.C. to present-day descendant families and homes in the Bethel-Christian Avenue-Laurel Hill Historical District.

Speculating agents from New England and eastern Long Island purchased the land from the Sachems and began settling families in 1655, when most of the parcels were granted to individuals and families ranging from 6 to 12 acres in Setauket, New York.

In 1889 Emma S. Clark died, and her bereaved Uncle Thomas G. Hodgkins purchased the land for the purpose of erecting a memorial to perpetuate her memory. Approximately $12,000 ($331K in 2018) was spent on infrastructure (grounds, buildings, books and fixtures), while an endowment of $16,000 was allotted for future purchases and operating expenses. Hodgkins died less than 2 months after the library was dedicated in October 1892.

It was his wish to leave an “Institution of a useful, benevolent and elevating character, which shall be a means of pleasure and culture to come,” John Elderkin, the Library trustee, stated in dedicating the memorial.

== Features ==
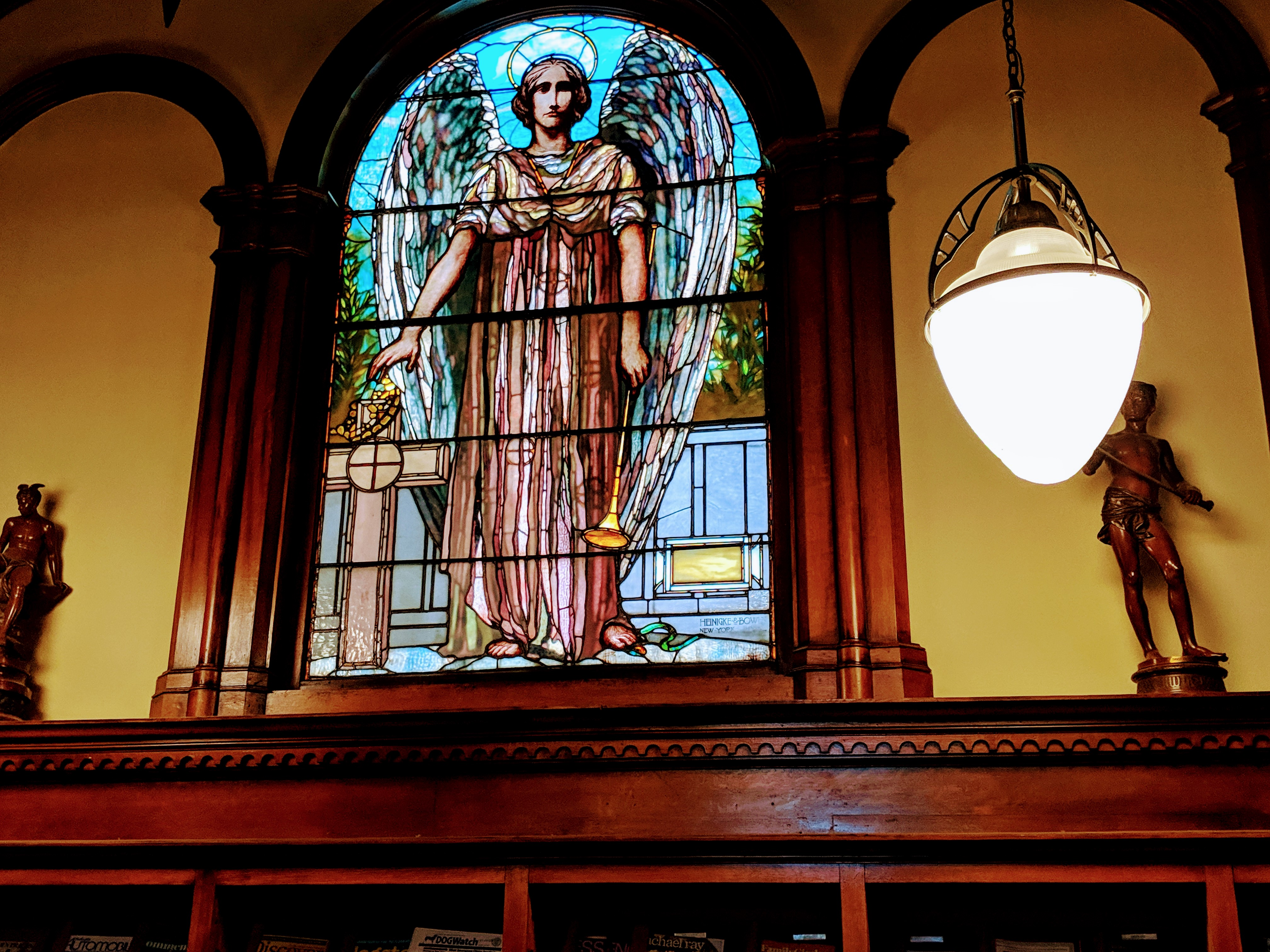
1892 Archangel Michael lead glass Emma Clark Library reading room.

The main feature on the façade is a 4-foot-tall clock with Roman numerals. Inside, the leaded glass window of the Archangel Michael-1892 by Otto Heinigke (1851–1915) and Owen J. Bowen (1873–1967) dominate the main reading room. The original collection of 1,500 reference books took up the stacks until a modernization in 1945 removed the public barrier.

Until then, librarians handled book requests and fetched the tomes for review. This modernization left intact the reading alcoves (where the fireplaces were) and others were added.

Prior to WWII, the only improvements were to the lights, which were electrified in 1913. There was an additional outbuilding which served as a home for the librarian and also a number of groundskeepers, it fell victim to a fire in 1945.

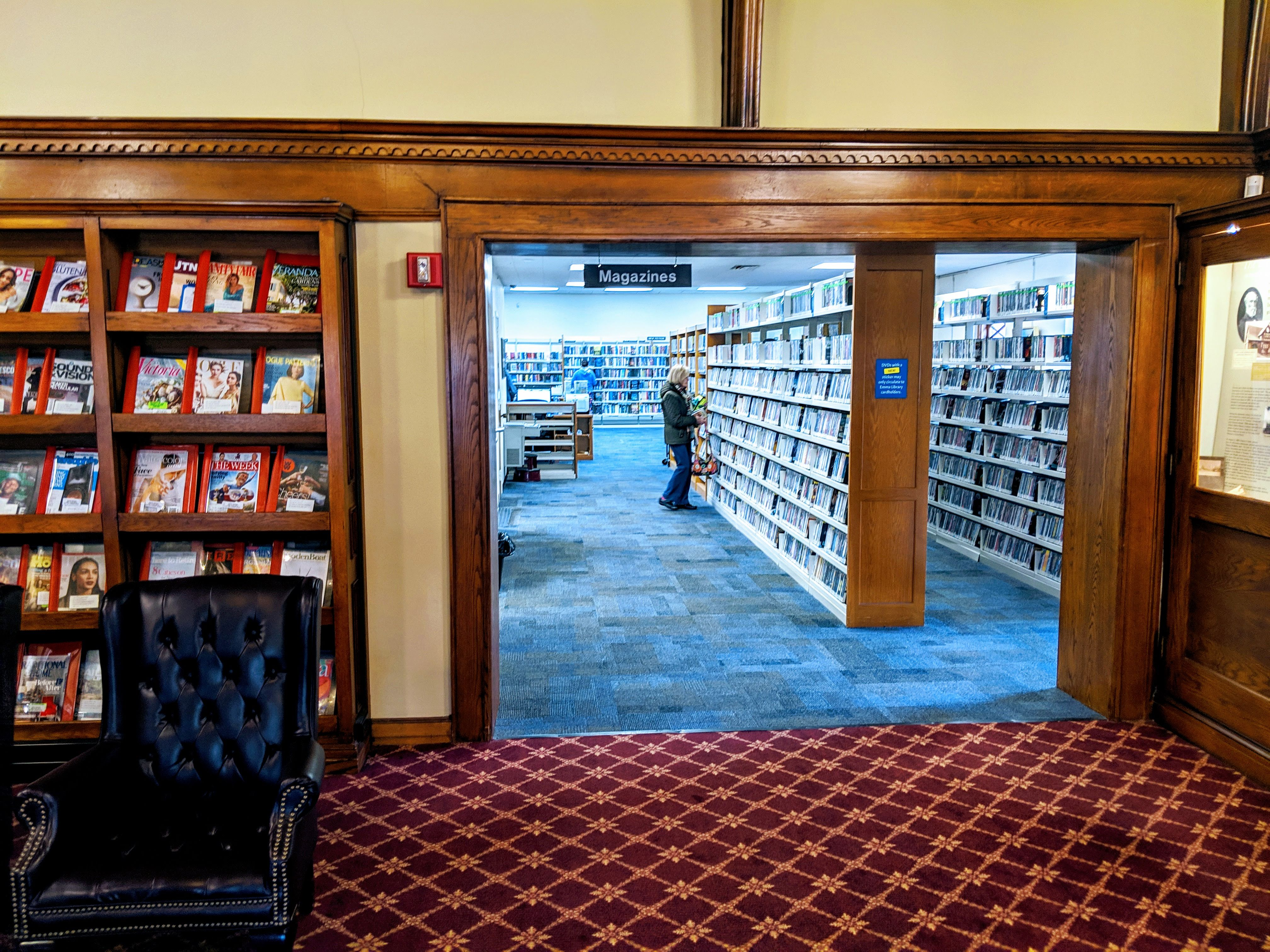
Interior of the Emma Clark Library.

There have been three major structural additions since the 1960s; currently, the library is home to more than 240,000 books, periodicals, software items and audio-visual media.

== Current events ==
The library has an oral history project: "Come to listen, learn and share your memories of the Three Village area. Bring your old photographs or artifacts and discover what stories they may hold." They meet in the Board Room on the lower level of the library. It is held weekly on Tuesdays; call ahead.

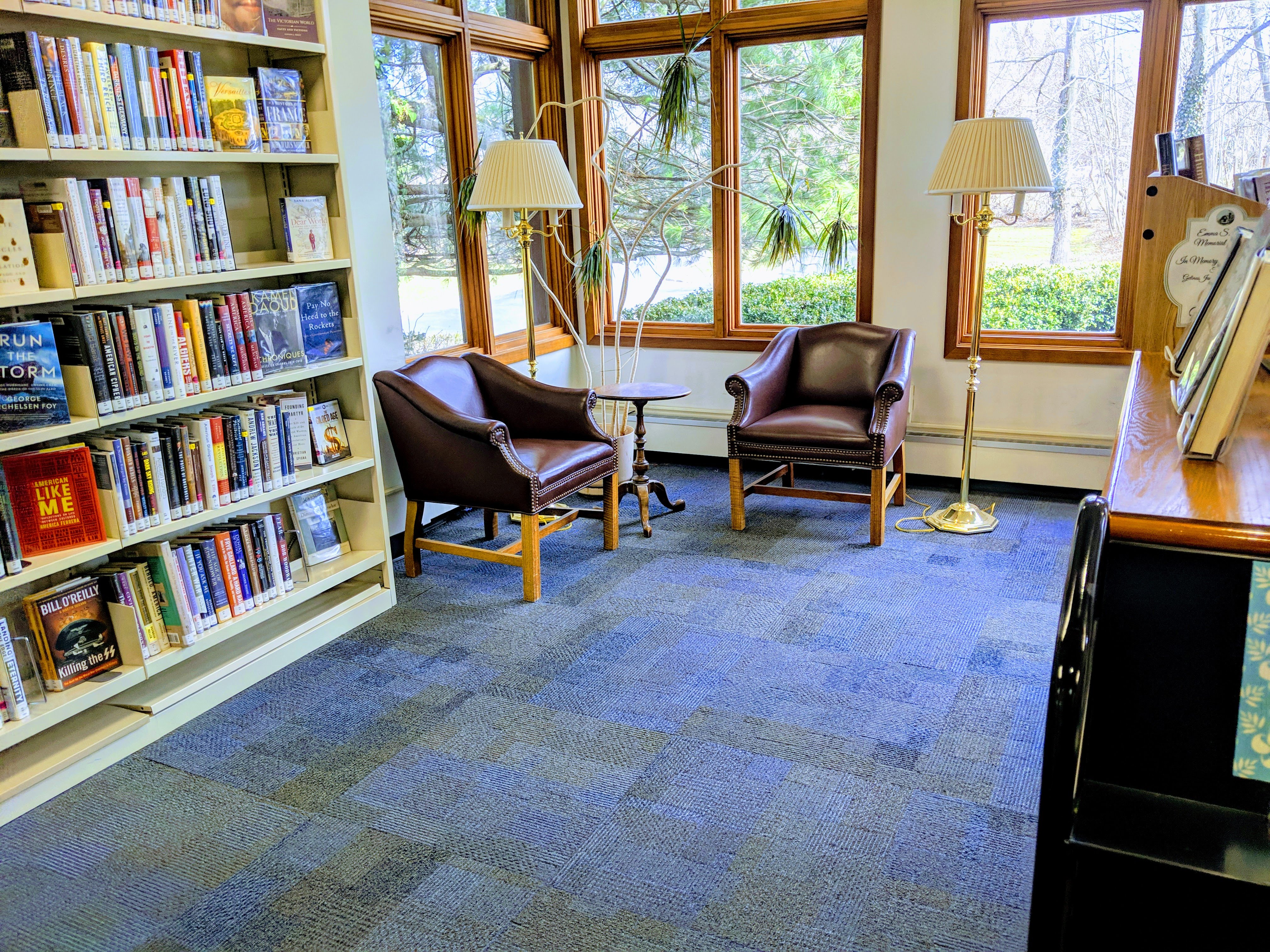
Reading room Emma Clark Library.
