= Three Village Central School District =

School district in Long Island, New York, United States

Coordinates: 40°55′11.61″N 73°7′58.41″W

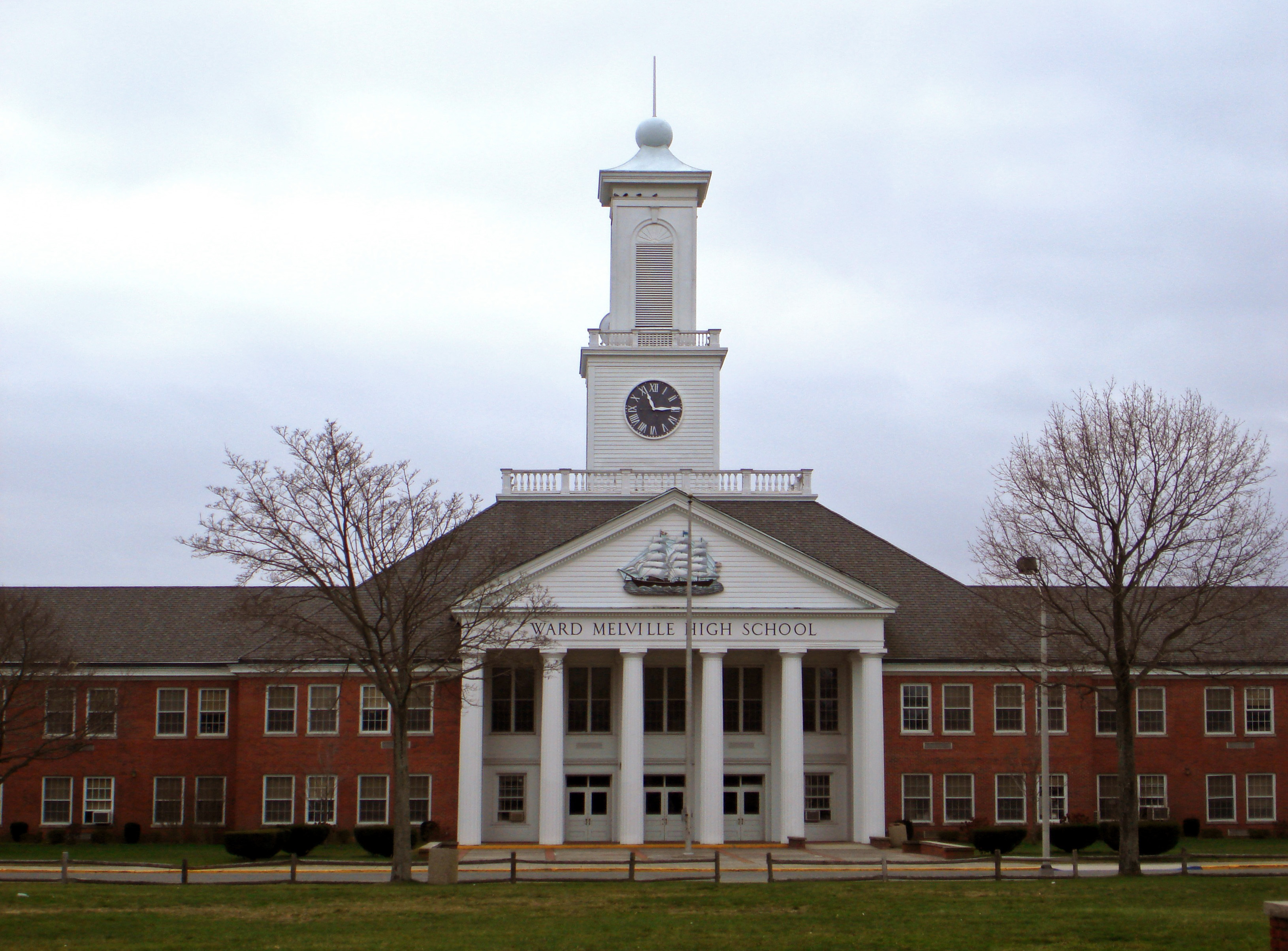
- The front entrance of Ward Melville High School

Location
- (New York (state)) North Country Administration Building, 100 Suffolk Avenue, Stony Brook, New York 11790-1821 USA

District information
- Type: Public / Suburban
- Grades: K-12
- Superintendent: Dr. Kevin Scanlon

Students and staff
- District mascot: Patriot
- Colors: Green and yellow

Other information
- Website: www.threevillagecsd.org

Three Village Central School District is a school district located in the towns of Brookhaven and Smithtown in Suffolk County, New York on the North Shore of Long Island. As of 2020, it serves all of Setauket, Old Field, and Poquott, the vast majority of East Setauket and Stony Brook, parts of Head of the Harbor, Centereach, Port Jefferson Station, Lake Grove, and Port Jefferson, and encompasses the Stony Brook University campus.

The school district is renowned for its InSTAR program, a three-year science research program which produces record numbers of Regeneron Science Talent Search (formerly Intel STS) semifinalists. In 2008, the district's program produced 13 semifinalists, the most semifinalists from a single school in the entire nation. The district's Intellectually Gifted (I.G.) program is housed at its Nassakeag Elementary School. Unfortunately, the IG program was discontinued due to budget cuts. The Three Village CSD has been represented at nationals for Science Olympiad and by various varsity sports teams.

== History ==
Its name came from the older, original "Three Villages" of Setauket, Stony Brook and Old Field. The district formed in order to improve education in the "Three Village" area, which also includes Poquott. It was formed with the merger of the Stony Brook and Setauket school districts in the 1960s. Ward Melville, a local philanthropist, was a proponent of the Three Village school district, and contributed land for its new schools.

== Notable alumni ==
Notable alumni of Ward Melville High School include:

- Marco Beltrami (Class of 1984) - professional film composer (Scream)
- Andrew Scheps (Class of 1984) - Grammy winning record producer/engineer (U2, Red Hot Chili Peppers, Johnny Cash)
- Howard S. Berger (Class of 1982) - avant garde film-maker
- Greg Cattrano (Class of 1993) - MLL goalie for the Baltimore Bayhawks
- Frances Conroy (Class of 1971) - actress (Six Feet Under)
- Eric Corley (Class of 1978) - Writer, founder of 2600: the hacker quarterly, Director of freedom downtime
- Chris Dieterich (Class of 1976) - NFL lineman for the Detroit Lions, 1980–86
- Michael R. Douglas (Class of 1979) - worldwide leading string theorist
- Brooke Ellison (Class of 1996) - the first quadriplegic to graduate from Harvard University
- Mick Foley (Class of 1983) - professional wrestler and author
- John Fugelsang (Class of 1987) - host of America's Funniest Home Videos, 1997–2000
- Jarrod Gorbel (Class of 1993) - indie singer-songwriter
- Kevin James (Class of 1983) - comedian/actor (The King of Queens).
- Brian MacDevitt (Class of 1973) - Four-time Tony Award-winning lighting designer
- Burton Rocks (Class of 1990)- bestselling author, sports attorney/agent
- Todd Sauerbrun (Class of 1991) - retired NFL punter who played for the Chicago Bears, Kansas City Chiefs, Carolina Panthers, and then finally the Denver Broncos 1995–2007.
- Joe Silipo - Former professional football player
- Joyce Yang (Class of 2004) - Concert Pianist; Silver Medalist, 2005 Van Cliburn International Piano Competition.
- Steven Matz (Class of 2009) - Left-Handed Pitcher for the New York Mets
- Anthony Kay (Class of 2013) - Left-Handed Pitcher for the Toronto Blue Jays

== Schools ==
- High School (Grades 9–12):
  - Ward Melville High School
- Middle Schools (Grades 6- 8):
  - Robert Cushman Murphy Middle School
  - Paul J. Gelinas Middle School
- Elementary Schools (Grades K-5):
  - Setauket Elementary School
  - Minnesauke Elementary School
  - Nassakeag Elementary School
  - Arrowhead Elementary School
  - William Sidney Mount Elementary School
  - North Country School (Closed in 1980)
  - Christian Avenue School (Grades K-1) (Closed in 1976)

== Administration ==
Central administration of the Three VIllage Central School District.

- Dr. Kevin Scanlon, Superintendent of Schools
- Dr. Brian Biscari, Assistant Superintendent for Education Services
- Dr. Gary Dabrusky, Assistant Superintendent for Human Resources
- Erin Connolly, Assistant to the Superintendent for Pupil Personnel Services
- Laura Pimentel, Assistant to the Superintendent & Chief Information Officer
- Mr. Jeffrey Carlson, Deputy Superintendent

== Board of education ==
Board of Education members for the 2023–2024 school year (with year elected in parentheses) are:

- Susan Megroz Rosenzweig (2021)
- Vincent Vizzo (2022)
- Jeffrey Kerman (2023)
- Shaorui Li (2021)
- David McKinnon (2023)
- Karen Roughley (2023)
