= Thompson House (Setauket, New York) =

Historic house in New York, United States

- U.S. National Register of Historic Places
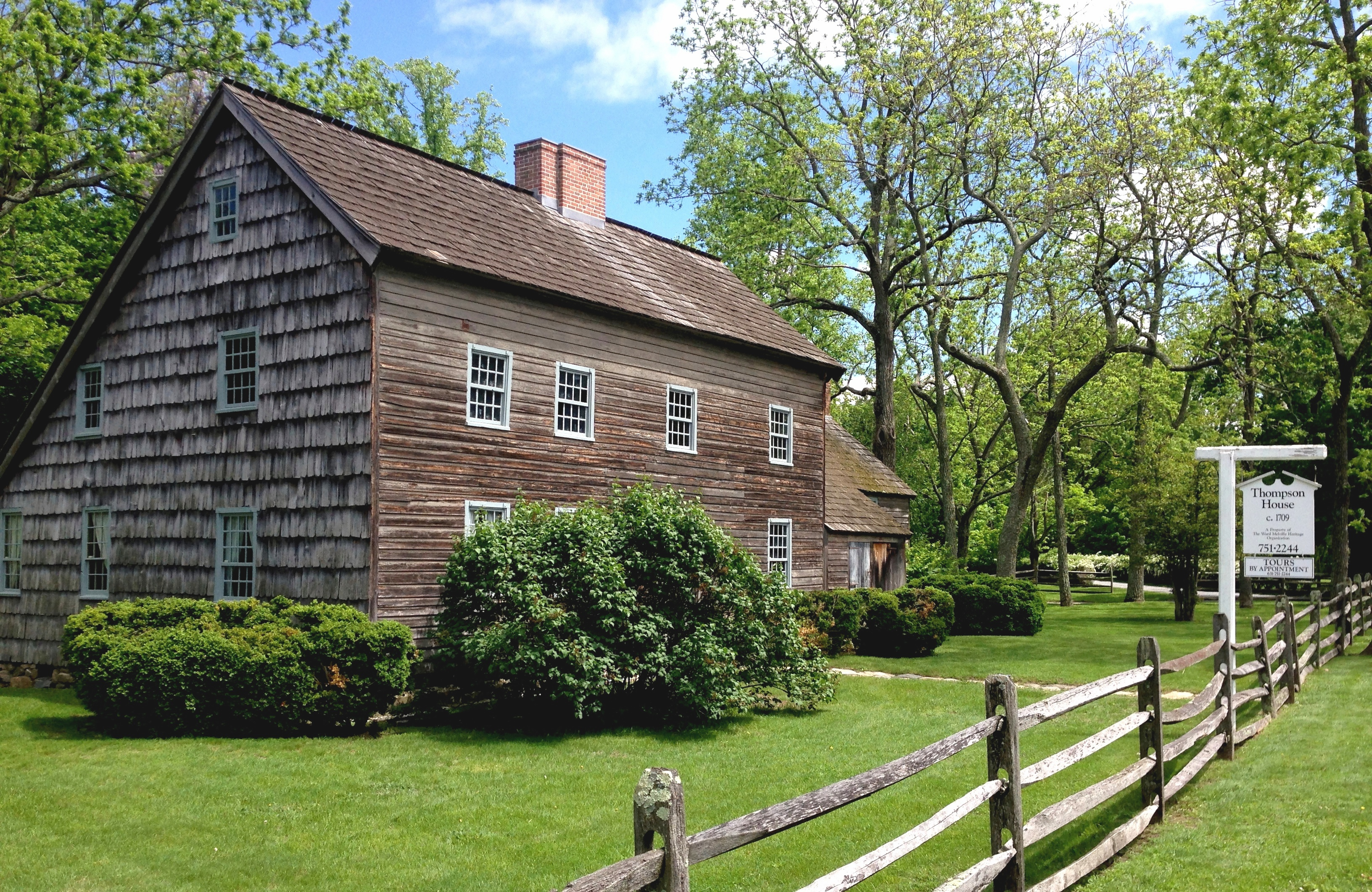
- The Samuel Thompson House as seen in May 2014

- Location within New York Location within the United States
- Location: N. Country Rd., Setauket, New York
- Coordinates: 40°56′0.6″N 73°07′4″W
- Area: 1.1 acres (0.45 ha)
- Built: 1709
- Architect: Samuel Thompson
- Architectural style: New England saltbox
- NRHP reference No.: 87002283
- Added to NRHP: January 7, 1988

Thompson House is a historic house on N. Country Road in Setauket, Suffolk County, New York. It was built in 1709 and is a saltbox form dwelling. It is a rectangular, timber frame two story building with a one-story wing. It features a steeply pitched, asymmetrical gable roof with a central brick chimney.

It was added to the National Register of Historic Places in 1988.
