= Ward Melville =

American businessman and philanthropist (1887–1977)

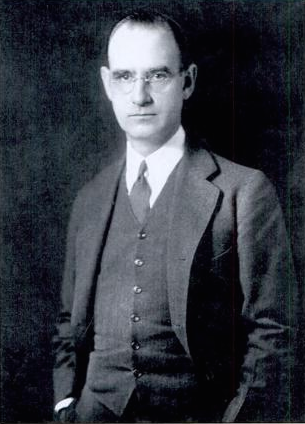
- Born: John Ward Melville; January 5, 1887; Brooklyn, New York, U.S.
- Died: June 5, 1977 (aged 90); New York City, U.S.
- Education: Columbia University
- Occupation: Businessman
- Spouse: Dorothy Bigelow (m. 1909)
- Children: 4

John Ward Melville (January 5, 1887 – June 5, 1977) was an American philanthropist and businessman active in the "Three Villages" in western Suffolk County, Long Island, New York. He donated 400 acres of land and money to establish Stony Brook University in 1957, which has developed as a major public research institution. He played a major role in the development of Melville Corporation, known today as CVS Health.

== Early life ==
Melville was born in Brooklyn to businessman and philanthropist Frank Melville Jr. and his wife, Jennie Florence (née MacConnell) Melville. His father was a nephew of sculptor John Quincy Adams Ward. He attended Columbia University, where he was active in the Columbia Daily Spectator and the Philolexian Society.

Melville married Dorothy Bigelow, who helped him continue the civic work of his parents such as the restoration of the Colonial village in Stony Brook. The couple had four children.

== Career ==
Following graduation in 1909, Melville joined his father's shoe company, Melville Corporation. Upon the United States' entrance into World War I, Melville became a soldier of the U.S. Army and the firm mass produced shoes for the Army's soldiers.

After the war, Melville continued to work in his father's company, eventually taking control of it in 1922. At the time, he created the Thom McAn shoe line, which became popular. The brand, was named after the golfer Thomas McCann, focused on fine shoes and reached hundreds of stores before it declined. He was CEO of the corporation.

Melville was also part of Macy's Board of Directors and he retired in 1953.

=== Philanthropy and civic activities ===
Melville settled in the Stony Brook area in western Suffolk County on Long Island, where he owned much land. He served as a member of the school board in Setauket, where he donated the land for the high school. From 1948 to 1949 he was the 66th President of the Saint Andrew's Society of the State of New York.

Melville was very active in philanthropic works around the "Three Village" area (Stony Brook, Setauket, and Old Field) and the surrounding towns. He supported the restoration and preservation of historic buildings in the area to encourage his vision of a New England village. Under his leadership, Stony Brook was organized around a town green and the Stony Brook Village Center was completed in 1941. He also supported conservation of natural areas, including the West Meadow Beach.

Another interest was education and he developed land for the high school in Setauket, which was named for him. His larger contribution was the donation of 400 acres of land and money to New York state to establish what is now the Stony Brook University, which was founded in 1957. First operating with classes in Oyster Bay, its current campus opened in 1962. Emphasizing teacher education in mathematics and sciences, the university developed into a leading public research institution in medicine and science and was named as one of New York's two flagship universities by Governor Kathy Hochul in 2022. Governor W. Averell Harriman appointed Melville as chairman of the Council of the university, where he served for some years.

== Personal life ==
After joining his father in his company in 1909, Melville married Dorothy Bigelow (1894–1989), a daughter of Isabella Lyall and Charles Emerson Bigelow. In 1924, the Melvilles purchased a property in Old Field on Long Island. They expanded the home, a Cape Cod style cottage built by Alexander Hamilton Jr., a grandson of the first Treasury Secretary, and his wife, Elizabeth Nicoll Hamilton, into a 22-room mansion which they called Wide Water. The living room at Wide Water is believed to be the original cottage. The couple had two sons (Frank and David B. Melville) and two daughters, including:

- Margaret Melville (1919–2000), who married James Hancock Blackwell Jr. and were cofounders of the equestrian American Driving Society.
- Ruth Melville (c. 1920–1995), a philanthropist who married F. Henry Berlin Jr.

Melville died in 1977 and is buried in Setauket at the Caroline Church and Cemetery.

== Legacy and honors ==
- Numerous organizations are named after him, including the local high school, Ward Melville High School in Setauket.
- The main library at Stony Brook University is named for his father.
- The Ward Melville Social and Behavioral Sciences building at Stony Brook University was named in his honor.
