= National Register of Historic Places listings in Brookhaven (town), New York =

Map showing Brookhaven in New York and Suffolk County

This is a list of all National Register of Historic Places listings in the Town of Brookhaven, New York. The locations of National Register properties for which the latitude and longitude coordinates are included below, may be seen in an online map.

== Listings ==
	Name on the Register	Image	Date listed	Location	City or town	Description
1	Bald Hill Schoolhouse	Bald Hill Schoolhouse	July 21, 1988 (#88001018)	Horseblock Road; 40°50′06″N 73°02′34″W	Farmingville	
2	Bayles Shipyard	Bayles Shipyard	June 2, 2000 (#00000580)	101 East Broadway; 40°56′54″N 73°04′05″W	Port Jefferson	
3	Mary E. Bell House	Mary E. Bell House	November 13, 2020 (#100005831)	66 Railroad Ave. 40°48′13″N 72°47′24″W	Center Moriches	
4	Bellport Academy	Bellport Academy	July 4, 1980 (#02001452)	24 Academy Lane; 40°45′14″N 72°56′16″W	Bellport	
5	Bellport Village Historic District	Bellport Village Historic District	July 4, 1980 (#02001451)	Roughly bounded by South Country Road, Bellport Lane, Brown's Lane, Brewster Lane, and Bell Street; 40°45′30″N 72°56′12″W	Bellport	
6	Benner–Foos–Ceparano Estate	Benner–Foos–Ceparano Estate	August 22, 2016 (#16000557)	99 Van Brunt Manor & 6 Osprey Lane; 40°57′20″N 73°05′39″W	Poquott	Shingle Style 1890s estate is only Lamb & Rich design with bowed plan. Transitioned from vacation home to full-time residence over the 20th century; one of the few North Shore estates in its original form.
7	Bethel Christian Avenue Historic District	Bethel Christian Avenue Historic District	November 9, 2017 (#100001808)	Roughly Christian Ave., Hill & Locust Sts. 40°56′31″N 73°07′21″W	Setauket	African-American neighborhood built around 19th-century church
8	Mary Louise Booth Girlhood House	Mary Louise Booth Girlhood House	January 27, 2015 (#14001219)	E. Main St. 40°50′12″N 72°54′57″W	Yaphank	Childhood home of Mary Louise Booth, 19th-century newspaper editor and French translator. See these links, and this one too.
9	Brewster House	Brewster House	February 28, 2008 (#08000109)	Junction of NY 25A & Runs Road; 40°56′43″N 73°06′11″W	East Setauket	
10	Caroline Church and Cemetery	Caroline Church and Cemetery	September 9, 1991 (#91001148)	Junction of Dyke and Bates Roads; 40°56′49″N 73°06′46″W	Setauket	
11	Carrington House	Carrington House	January 8, 2014 (#13001057)	Lewis Walk (at eastern terminus of Ocean Walk); 40°39′43″N 73°04′39″W	Cherry Grove	Early 20th-century beach bungalow was home to theater director Frank Carrington and an early center of gay life on Fire Island; Truman Capote wrote Breakfast at Tiffany's during a stay there.
12	Cherry Grove Community House and Theatre	Cherry Grove Community House and Theatre	June 4, 2013 (#13000373)	180 Bayview Walk; 40°39′36″N 73°05′26″W	Cherry Grove	
13	Congregational Church of Patchogue	Congregational Church of Patchogue	April 1, 1993 (#93000279)	95 East Main Street; 40°45′57″N 73°00′47″W	Patchogue	
14	Davis Town Meeting House	Davis Town Meeting House	August 15, 2001 (#01000850)	Junction of Middle Country Road and Coram-Mt. Sinai Road; 40°52′54″N 72°59′01″W	Coram	
15	ELVIRA (sloop)		May 23, 2012 (#12000288)	Newey Lane; 40°46′17″N 72°53′54″W	Brookhaven	
16	First Congregational Church of New Village	First Congregational Church of New Village	April 11, 2002 (#02000361)	North side of Middle Country Road, West of Elliot Avenue; 40°51′35″N 73°06′37″W	Lake Grove	
17	First National Bank of Port Jefferson	First National Bank of Port Jefferson	October 5, 2005 (#05001134)	Main and East Main Streets; 40°56′43″N 73°04′06″W	Port Jefferson	
18	William Floyd House	William Floyd House	October 15, 1980 (#71000066)	20 Washington Avenue; 40°46′09″N 72°49′21″W	Mastic Beach	Owned and operated by the National Park Service and is a part of Fire Island National Seashore.
19	Gamecock Cottage	Gamecock Cottage	August 30, 2007 (#07000886)	Shipman's Point, South end of West Meadow Beach; 40°55′40″N 73°08′50″W	Stony Brook	
20	Noah Hallock House	Noah Hallock House	December 11, 2013 (#13000913)	172 Hallock Landing Road; 40°57′43″N 72°56′19″W	Rocky Point	Seaside frame cottage of early settler
21	Hawkins Homestead	Hawkins Homestead	June 9, 1988 (#88000727)	165 Christian Avenue; 40°55′45″N 73°08′19″W	Stony Brook	
22	Robert Hawkins Homestead	Robert Hawkins Homestead	April 10, 1986 (#86000702)	Yaphank Avenue; 40°49′04″N 72°55′04″W	Yaphank	
23	Homan-Gerard House and Mills	Homan-Gerard House and Mills	December 16, 1988 (#88002761)	Junction Main Street and Yaphank Road; 40°50′09″N 72°54′57″W	Yaphank	
24	Samuel Hopkins House	Samuel Hopkins House	February 26, 2009 (#09000057)	415 Pipe Stave Hollow Road; 40°57′30″N 73°01′16″W	Miller Place	
25	Hulse House		August 10, 2026 (#100013288)	40 Old Post Road; 40°56′22″N 73°05′29″W	East Setauket	
26	Nathaniel Longbotham House	Nathaniel Longbotham House	November 16, 1989 (#89002022)	1541 Stony Brook Road; 40°54′27″N 73°08′05″W	Stony Brook	
27	Masury Estate Ballroom	Masury Estate Ballroom	September 11, 1986 (#86002513)	Old Neck Road South; 40°46′54″N 72°48′26″W	Center Moriches	
28	Frank Melville Memorial Park	Frank Melville Memorial Park	July 19, 2010 (#10000486)	Old Field Road between Lake Street and Main Street; 40°56′42″N 73°06′57″W	Setauket	
29	Middle Island Presbyterian Church	Middle Island Presbyterian Church	December 7, 2005 (#05001388)	271 Middle Country Road; 40°52′49″N 72°57′48″W	Middle Island	
30	Miller Place Historic District	Miller Place Historic District	June 17, 1976 (#76001281)	North Country Road; 40°57′30″N 72°59′56″W	Miller Place	
31	William Sidney Mount House	William Sidney Mount House	October 15, 1966 (#66000575)	Stony Brook Road and NY 25A; 40°54′27″N 73°08′18″W	Stony Brook	
32	Old Bethel Cemetery	Old Bethel Cemetery	November 9, 2017 (#100001810)	Christian & Woodfield Avenues; 40°55′54″N 73°07′59″W	Stony Brook	Final resting place of many early residents of the Bethel Christian Avenue Historic District
33	Old Field Club and Farm	Old Field Club and Farm	February 2, 2016 (#15001027)	86 West Meadow Road; 40°56′49″N 73°08′22″W	East Setauket	Early social center of Setauket when built for a residential community in 1930
34	Old Field Point Light Station	Old Field Point Light Station	January 25, 2024 (#100009784)	207 Old Field Road; 40°58′37″N 73°07′07″W	Setauket	
35	Point O'Woods Historic District		July 29, 2021 (#100006763)	Point O'Woods, Bay, and Ridge Aves., Church St. 40°39′04″N 73°07′58″W	Point O' Woods	
36	Port Jefferson Village Historic District	Port Jefferson Village Historic District	April 6, 2005 (#05000265)	Roughly along East Main Street, East Broadway, Grant Street, High Street and South Street; 40°56′49″N 73°03′58″W	Port Jefferson	
37	Setauket Presbyterian Church and Burial Ground	Setauket Presbyterian Church and Burial Ground	September 27, 1996 (#96001023)	5 Caroline Avenue; 40°56′45″N 73°06′41″W	Setauket	
38	Sherwood-Jayne House	Sherwood-Jayne House	December 2, 2009 (#09000969)	55 Old Post Road; 40°56′21″N 73°05′20″W	East Setauket	
39	Smith Estate	Smith Estate	December 10, 1981 (#81000414)	Longwood and Smith Roads; 40°52′05″N 72°54′24″W	Ridge	Also known as Longwood Estate - Smith House
40	Smith-Rourke House	Smith-Rourke House	November 28, 1989 (#89002021)	350 South Country Road; 40°45′43″N 72°58′44″W	East Patchogue	
41	St. Andrew's Episcopal Church	St. Andrew's Episcopal Church	September 15, 1988 (#88001442)	Main Street; 40°50′12″N 72°54′55″W	Yaphank	
42	St. James Chapel	St. James Chapel	June 16, 2000 (#00000583)	East side of Main Street, 250 ft. North of Stony Brook Lane; 40°54′56″N 73°08′50″W	Stony Brook	
43	St. Paul's Episcopal Church Complex	St. Paul's Episcopal Church Complex	June 22, 1995 (#95000722)	31 Rider Avenue; 40°45′52″N 73°00′33″W	Patchogue	
44	Stony Brook Grist Mill	Stony Brook Grist Mill	August 3, 1990 (#90001140)	Harbor Road, West of Main Street; 40°54′49″N 73°08′47″W	Stony Brook	
45	Suffolk County Almshouse Barn	Suffolk County Almshouse Barn	September 11, 1986 (#86002512)	West of Yaphank Avenue; 40°49′41″N 72°55′18″W	Yaphank	
46	Swan River Schoolhouse	Swan River Schoolhouse	August 18, 2017 (#100001492)	31 Roe Avenue; 40°45′52″N 72°59′20″W	East Patchogue	
47	Terry-Ketcham Inn	Terry-Ketcham Inn	June 24, 1993 (#92000555)	81 Main Street; 40°48′08″N 72°46′52″W	Center Moriches	
48	Thompson House	Thompson House	January 7, 1988 (#87002283)	North Country Road; 40°56′01″N 73°07′04″W	Setauket	
49	United Methodist Church	United Methodist Church	April 19, 1984 (#84003006)	South Ocean Avenue and Church Street; 40°45′52″N 73°00′53″W	Patchogue	
50	Union Savings Bank	Union Savings Bank	June 11, 2010 (#10000337)	62 South Ocean Avenue; 40°45′52″N 73°00′54″W	Patchogue	On the opposite corner from United Methodist Church (Patchogue, New York)
51	US Post Office-Patchogue	US Post Office-Patchogue	May 11, 1989 (#88002397)	170 East Main Street; 40°45′55″N 73°00′42″W	Patchogue	
52	USS SAN DIEGO (Armored Cruiser) Shipwreck Site	USS SAN DIEGO (Armored Cruiser) Shipwreck Site	February 17, 1998 (#98000071)	Address Restricted	Fire Island	
53	Wardenclyffe Laboratories	Wardenclyffe Laboratories	July 27, 2018 (#100002744)	56 NY 25A; 40°56′54″N 72°53′54″W	Shoreham	Ruins of laboratory designed by Stanford White for Nicola Tesla's early telecommunications research in 1901
54	Josiah Woodhull House	Josiah Woodhull House	August 24, 2011 (#11000602)	170 North Country Rd. 40°57′30″N 72°52′12″W	Shoreham	

== Former listings ==
	Name on the Register	Image	Date listed	Date removed	Location	City or town	Description
1	Radio Central Complex	Radio Central Complex	June 27, 1980 (#80002777)	April 25, 1997	S of Rocky Point on Rocky Point-Yaphank Rd.	Rocky Point vicinity	Currently owned by the New York State Department of Environmental Conservation. See this link also.
2	West Meadow Beach Historic District	West Meadow Beach Historic District	October 28, 2004 (#04001195)	June 24, 2022	Trustees Road; 40°55′59″N 73°08′48″W	Stony Brook	

== See also ==
- National Register of Historic Places listings in New York
- National Register of Historic Places listings in Suffolk County, New York
