= Gamecock (disambiguation) =

A gamecock is a rooster that is bred for fighting. Gamecock may also refer to:

== South Carolina history and symbolism ==
- Thomas Sumter, the "Carolina Gamecock" (1734–1832), South Carolina military leader during the American Revolution
- The South Carolina Gamecocks, the varsity sports teams of the University of South Carolina
- The Daily Gamecock, a student newspaper of the University of South Carolina
- Sumter Gamecocks, the varsity sports teams of Sumter High School in Sumter, South Carolina

== Military ==
- Gloster Gamecock, a biplane fighter of the Royal Air Force
- Gamecock Barracks (formerly HMS Gamecock), a military installation in England

== Other ==
- Gamecock Cottage, an historic building located at Stony Brook in Suffolk County, New York
- The Gamecock (film), a 1974 Italian comedy film
- Gamecock Media Group, a video game publisher based in Austin, Texas
- Saltbush Bill's Gamecock, a humorous poem by Australian writer and poet Andrew Barton "Banjo" Paterson
- The Jacksonville State Gamecocks, the varsity sports teams of Jacksonville State University in Jacksonville, Alabama

== See also ==
- Cock (disambiguation)
