= Robert Hawkins Homestead =

Historic house in New York, United States

- U.S. National Register of Historic Places
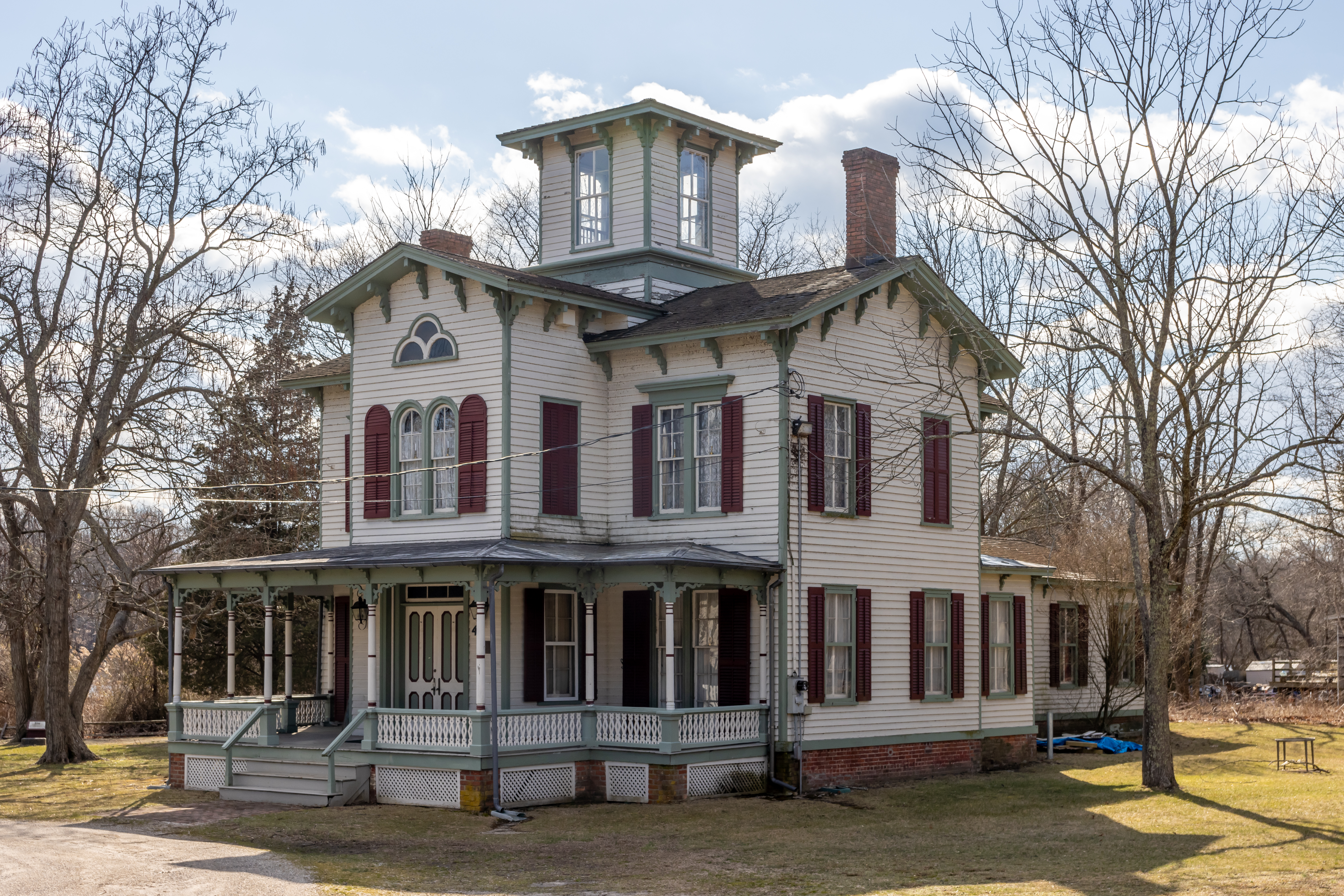

- Location within New York Location within the United States
- Location: Yaphank Avenue, Yaphank, New York
- Coordinates: 40°49′4″N 72°55′4″W
- Area: 2 acres (0.81 ha)
- Built: 1855
- Architectural style: Italianate
- NRHP reference No.: 86000702
- Added to NRHP: April 10, 1986

Robert Hawkins Homestead is a historic home located at Yaphank in Suffolk County, New York. It was built about 1855 and is a clapboard-sheathed, wood-frame building on a brick foundation. It has a symmetrical, two-story, three-bay, cruciform plan with low intersecting gable roofs in the Italianate style. It features a one-story verandah and a large central cupola on the building's rooftop.

It was added to the National Register of Historic Places in 1986, and is directly across the street from the Homan-Gerard House and Mills.
