= Mary E. Bell House =

- U.S. National Register of Historic Places
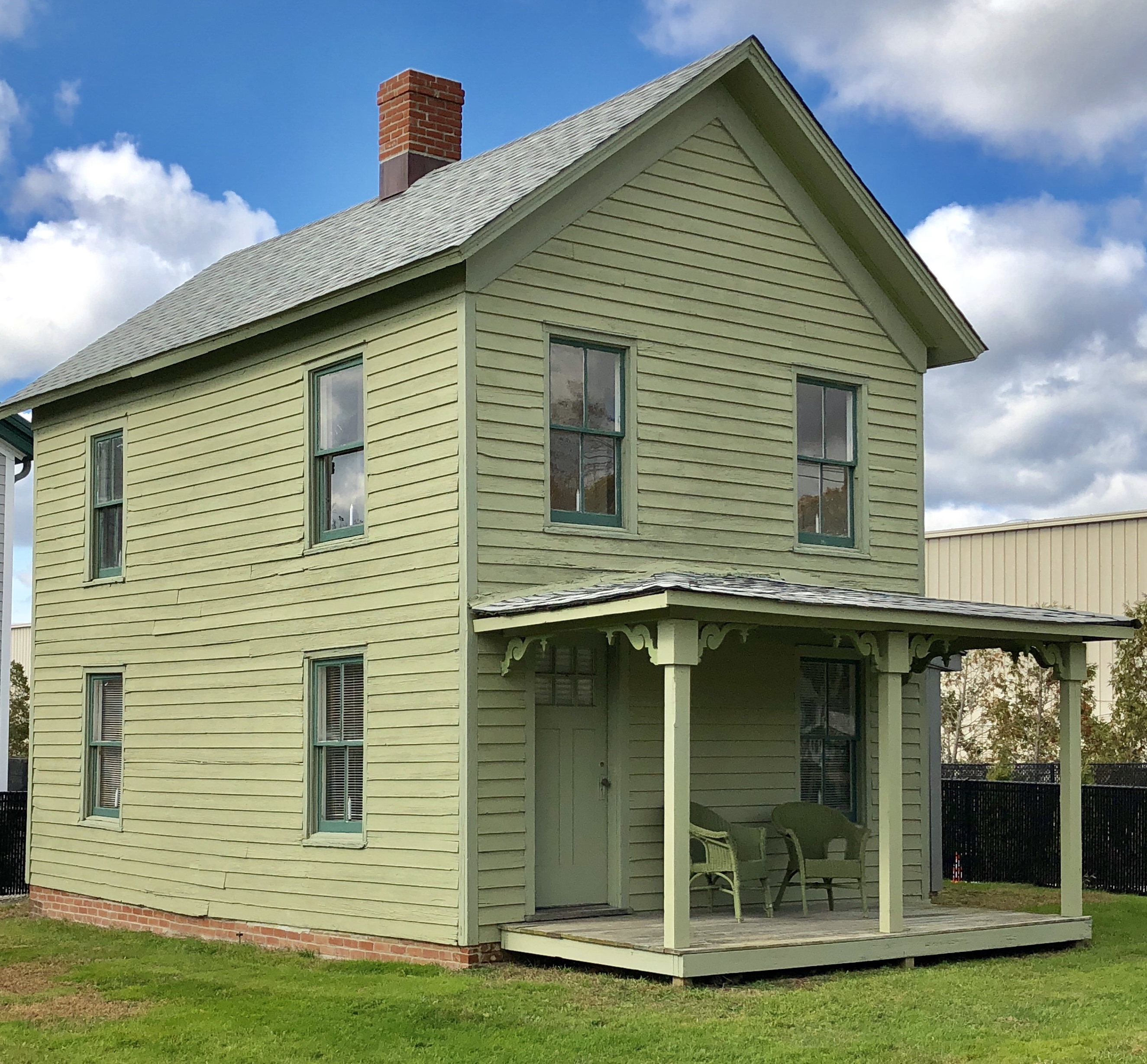

- Location within New York Location within the United States
- Location: 66 Railroad Avenue, Center Moriches, New York
- Coordinates: 40.8035°N 72.7901°W
- NRHP reference No.: 100005831
- Added to NRHP: November 13, 2020

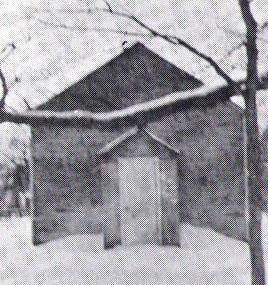
1847 AME Zion Church, c. 1900

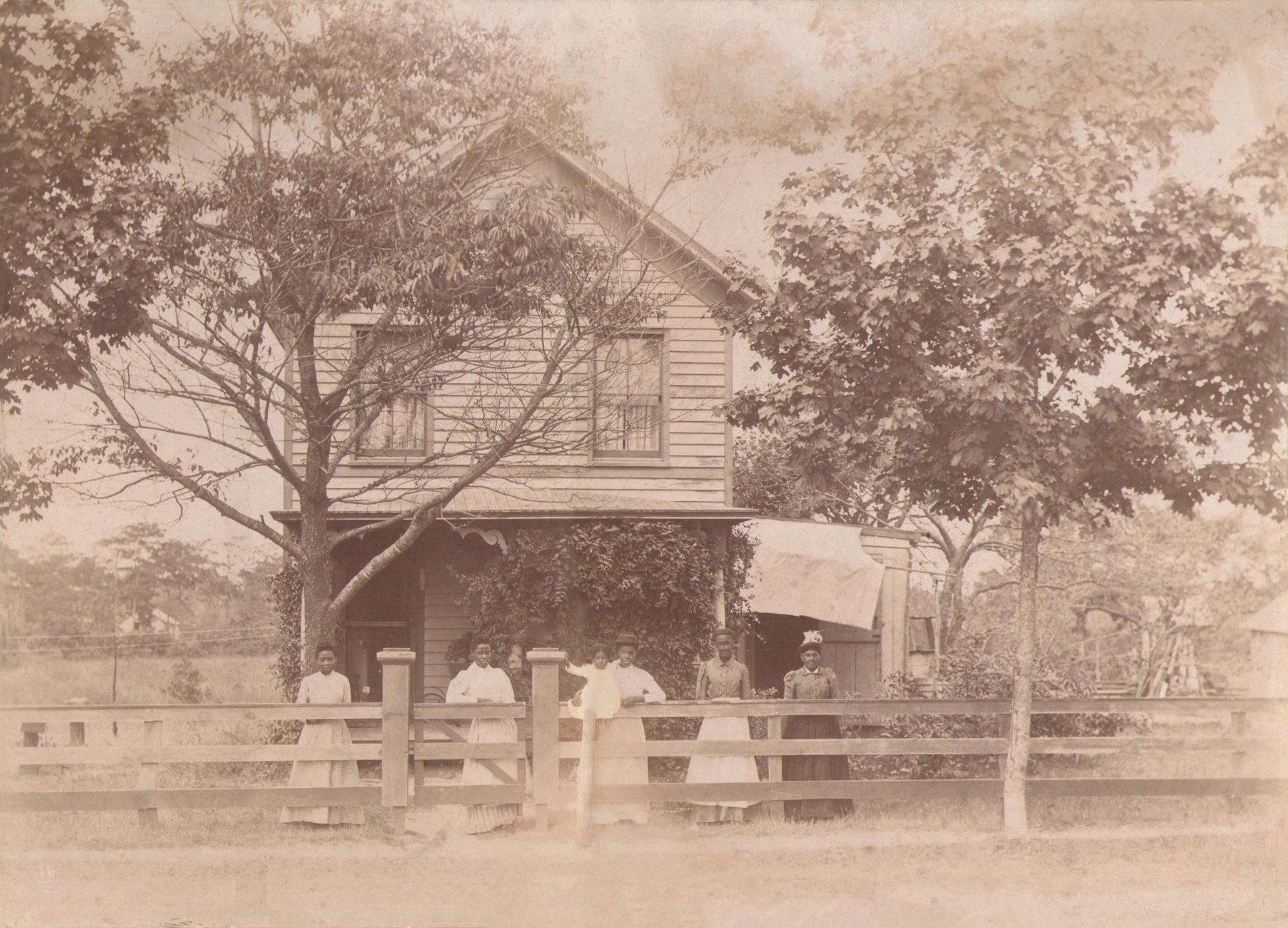
Restored c. 1900 Historic photo of the Mary E. Bell House, showing five women and a child

The Mary E. Bell House is a historic house at 66 Railroad Avenue approximately 1/10th mile south of the Long Island rail road in Center Moriches, Long Island, New York. Built in 1872 by Selah Smith of Huntington who purchased the land, it is significant in the area of ethnic history for the Smith and Bell families and the African-American AME Zion community of Center Moriches during the nineteenth and twentieth centuries. It was listed on the National Register of Historic Places in 2020. It is under the stewardship of Ketcham Inn Foundation.

== History ==
Selah W. Smith was a farm hand and his wife Mary Ann was a laundress. They had five daughters, Alice, Ada, Ida, Mary E., and Hannah whom lived with their parents in 1880. The expansion (Ca.1880) on the home was likely done to accommodate Mary's laundry business. The family had maintained a garden on the land north of the house. The Smiths walked the short block south to attend the AME church, which had become the center of African-American worship in Center Moriches and drew congregants from surrounding hamlets. When pastor Abraham Perdue died in 1888 followed shortly thereafter by his wife, Mary E. Smith and Annie Arch of Manorville kept the small congregation going in the next decade.

In 1895, Mary E. married a day laborer, Ernest Bell of North Carolina, and by 1900 the family with children Ethel, Alice and Lillian were the sole occupants of the house.

During the latter 1890s, Mary E. Bell became an adherent of the AME Zion's Varick Christian Endeavor Society, founded by James Varick in 1896. His liberation of female roles in the Zion sect (Founded 1821) would play a pivotal role in the Center Moriches AME congregation. In 1897, the congregation would break from the AME to officially become African Methodist Episcopal Zion (AMEZ). The AME Zion was the first to ordain female elders and deacons, allowing female delegates to its conference in 1897 to vote for trustees.

Christian Endeavor societies, like the Y.M.C.A., were very popular during the late 1890s among Protestant denominations. Their progressive focus was on attracting and keeping young adults, mainly men, active in the life of the congregations and the community. Most of these Societies, (over 800 by 1902 comprising 20,000 youths.) were run by women. Mary E. Bell would become the local leader of the Varick Christian Endeavor Society in Center Moriches from its beginnings as a co-ed social group with activities such as dinners, picnics and other service projects like food banks and providing educational assistance such as tutors and weekly bible classes.

From the turn of the century until it closed in 1914, the small church was dependent on Mary Bell and Annie Arch for its survival, Ministers came and visited from the AME Zion and members were lost from various causes, relocations and deaths also contributed to its demise. Annie would in summer and winter come over from her farm in Manorville to worship with her friends and the remaining congregants. After it closed its doors, Mary bell continued to hold church gatherings in her house informally, by 1915 her husband Ernest would become institutionalized and would remain so until his death in 1950. Mary and the girls, Alice (b. 1898) and Lillian, with son Eugene (b. 1902) were in the house in 1920 when the church's fortunes began to turn due to the Great Migration. African-Americans from the south had come to work on the farms of L.I. and the AME Zion sent a minister, Rev. William E. Wright, to take the reins of the congregation. When Mary Bell died, her beloved church took on a new name, the Bell AME Zion Church, so named in her honor.

== Alice Bell ==
Alice Bell, who was born at 66 Railroad Ave, would inherit the house from her mother. Between the 1920s and the 1950s, she would figure prominently in the AMEZ church of Center Moriches as it grew and prospered. A trustee, she served on the Ladies Aid society and was prominent in the fundraising activities of the organization. When the church outgrew the elder building musical events were held to fund a new church, events that drew attendance from outside the congregation with dinners and other programs held at her house. The 1847 church building was moved to 123 Railroad Ave. By 1954 she was also famous for her sweet potato pies, they would be her most prominent featured dish at gatherings and fundraisers for the rest of her life. Alice never wed, or drove an automobile, she lived a quiet life, active in her church and kept working as a housekeeper. She was honored by the church in her later years, ordained a Deaconess and elevated to membership in the Women's Home and Overseas Missionary Society, a major outreach of the AME Zion church in the 1980s.

Alice Bell died in 1996, the house was taken from the family for tax liabilities and legal wrangling caused it to become a deteriorating rental property for the next decade, for which demolition loomed in 2009. The Bell AME Zion church advocated for it to be preserved and in 2011 the Town of Brookhaven passed a resolution designating the ‘’’Mary E. Bell house’’’ a historic landmark and took ownership of the property, working in partnership with Ketcham Inn Foundation to formally reopen the house as a contributing property in the Center Moriches Historic District. It opened as a historic site on June 22, 2019 and made available to the public as an event space.

== Landmark status ==
During its life, the house served the African-American community during a time when the local church closed its doors for a brief space and the house became the second home to the congregation in the integrated community. With the help of Bert Seides, a preservationist, the house was proposed for historic preservation in 2011 by the Ketcham Inn Foundation, which partnered with Brookhaven on its restoration, and now operates it as a special event space and museum.

The Mary E. Bell House was declared a Brookhaven town landmark in 2011. It was listed on the National Register of Historic Places in 2020.

== Events ==
Mary E. Bell House has hosted annual Juneteenth celebrations since 2020.

== See also ==
- National Register of Historic Places listings in Brookhaven, New York
- Terry-Ketcham Inn, another National Register site under the stewardship of Ketcham Inn Foundation
