= Sokolin =

American fine-wine merchant

- Type: Private
- Industry: Wine retail
- Founded: 1934; 92 years ago in Manhattan, New York, U.S.
- Founder: David Sokolin
- Headquarters: Yaphank, New York, U.S.
- Products: Fine and rare wine; wine storage
- Website: www.sokolin.com

Sokolin is an American fine-wine merchant and brokerage based in Yaphank, New York. Founded in 1934 as a Manhattan liquor store, it has traded under names including the D. Sokolin Company, William Sokolin Wine Merchants, and Sokolin LLC, and has remained in the Sokolin family across three generations. It became known for trading in rare and investment-grade wine, for the books two of its proprietors wrote on wine as an asset, and for a 1989 dinner at which one of its owners, William Sokolin, accidentally broke a 1787 Château Margaux said to have belonged to Thomas Jefferson, then reported as the most expensive bottle ever broken.

For more than four decades, from the early 1970s until his death in 2015, William Sokolin was a regular source for The New York Times on wine as an investment; the paper later turned to his son David in the same role.

== Founding and early years ==
David Sokolin, a Russian immigrant, opened Dave's Liquors at 178 Madison Avenue in Manhattan in 1934, shortly after the repeal of Prohibition. By the family's own published accounts, the founder was among the first in line for a license after Prohibition's repeal and received "License No. 4" from the New York State Liquor Authority.

The founder's son, William "Bill" Sokolin (April 25, 1930 – April 28, 2015), grew up in New York, attended the Horace Mann School and Tufts College, and was signed by Branch Rickey to a Brooklyn Dodgers farm team before enlisting in the U.S. Army during the Korean War. He joined the family business on his return and, after inheriting the store on his father's death at the end of the 1950s, redirected it from spirits to fine wine.

== Wine investment and the Sokolin books ==
Under William Sokolin the firm specialized in fine and rare wine and in wine as an investment. As early as December 1971, the Times reported that Sokolin of the D. Sokolin Company had circulated a memo to customers recommending wine as a speculative investment, joking that he might soon have to register with the Securities and Exchange Commission. He became a recurring presence in Frank J. Prial's New York Times wine columns through the 1970s and 1980s. He liked to say that fine wine was the one investment you could "always liquidate — pleasurably." Sokolin was among the first American merchants to sell Bordeaux futures (en primeur) to United States buyers, and he is credited with popularizing the term "investment-grade wine."

He set out his approach in two books: Liquid Assets: How to Develop an Enjoyable and Profitable Wine Portfolio (Macmillan, 1987) and The Complete Wine Investor, written with Tom Philbin (Prima, 1998). By the end of the 1980s the Times and the wine trade were treating him as an authority on the subject. He steered investors toward a narrow core of blue-chip Bordeaux — Lafite Rothschild, Mouton Rothschild, Latour, Haut-Brion and Pétrus among them.

== The 1787 Château Margaux ==
On the night of April 23, 1989, at a dinner at the Four Seasons Restaurant in Manhattan held to mark the arrival of the 1986 Bordeaux vintage, Sokolin brought a bottle of 1787 Château Margaux engraved with the initials "Th.J." The bottle was said to have been found in a Paris cellar in 1985 and to have once belonged to Thomas Jefferson, and Sokolin had been trying to sell it for $519,750. While showing it to the assembled guests, he bumped into a metal-topped tray table and put two holes in the back of the bottle; most of the wine ran out onto the carpet. "I committed murder," he told a Times reporter a few hours later.

The bottle was one of the Jefferson-engraved bottles linked to the German collector Hardy Rodenstock, whose finds were later widely disputed and were the subject of Benjamin Wallace's 2008 book The Billionaire's Vinegar; Sokolin had taken it on consignment. The bottle was insured, and after the break the insurer, Lloyd's of London, took it over from Sokolin. The damaged bottle was offered at auction at Guernsey's in Manhattan in 1991, where bidding opened at $30,000 and dwindled to a high bid of $100; it went unsold. Sokolin's family said he later donated it to Save the Children. The Associated Press and People covered the spill, and The New York Times ran a same-day editorial on it; People called the result "the world's most expensive puddle."

== David Sokolin and later operations ==
David "Dave" Sokolin, the founder's grandson and William's son, took over the company in 1992 and in 1996 moved its base from Manhattan to the Hamptons, refocusing the business around catalog, telephone and internet sales backed by a climate-controlled storage facility. He continued the family's authorship with Investing in Liquid Assets: Uncorking Profits in Today's Global Wine Market, written with Alexandra Bruce (Simon & Schuster, 2008), which was reviewed in the regional press.

Like his father, David Sokolin has been quoted by The New York Times as a commentator on the fine-wine market — on the role of the internet and emerging markets in broadening access to fine-wine investing, and on how Asian demand drove Bordeaux first growths such as Lafite Rothschild to record highs after the 2008 financial crisis. The company, now based in Yaphank, New York, sells fine and rare wine and provides wine storage for collectors and investors.

== Recognition ==
Sokolin was named "Best US Wine Shop" in the 2020 Best Wine of the World (BWW) competition hosted by Tastingbook. The critic James Suckling featured David Sokolin in a 2012 video series, the "Wine Challenge," filmed at the company.

== Books ==
- William Sokolin, Liquid Assets: How to Develop an Enjoyable and Profitable Wine Portfolio (Macmillan, 1987). ISBN 978-0026123006.
- William Sokolin with Tom Philbin, The Complete Wine Investor (Prima, 1998). ISBN 978-0761516767.
- David Sokolin with Alexandra Bruce, Investing in Liquid Assets: Uncorking Profits in Today's Global Wine Market (Simon & Schuster, 2008). ISBN 978-1-4165-5017-4.
