= Captain Robert Robinson =

Captain Robert Robinson (1685? – May 7, 1762) was born in Miller Place, New York. A Queen Anne's War veteran, he is considered to be one of the founders of the hamlet of Yaphank, Suffolk County, New York, in 1726. He married Mary Davis in 1703. Captain Robinson died May 7, 1762, in Pipestove Hollow, Mount Sinai, New York. His father was John Robinson (1654–1734), a member of the General Assembly of 1691 from Queens County.
