= St. Andrew's Episcopal Church (Yaphank, New York) =

Historic church in New York, United States

- U.S. National Register of Historic Places
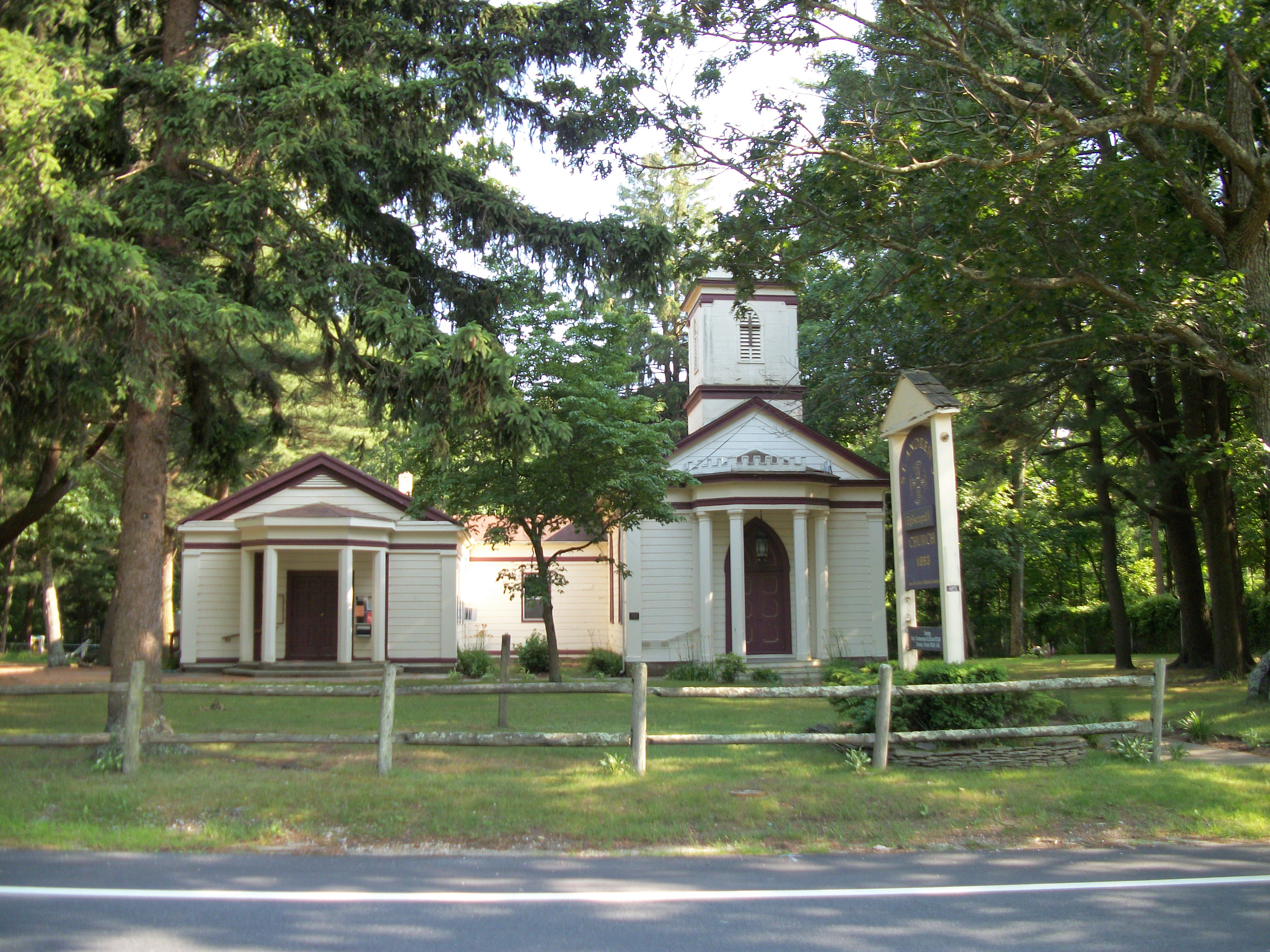

- Location within New York Location within the United States
- Location: Main St., Yaphank, New York
- Coordinates: 40°50′12″N 72°54′55″W
- Area: 1 acre (0.40 ha)
- Built: 1853
- Architect: Petty, Edmund
- Architectural style: Greek Revival, Gothic Revival
- NRHP reference No.: 88001442
- Added to NRHP: September 15, 1988

St. Andrew's Episcopal Church is a historic church on East Main Street in Yaphank, New York.

The church was built on land formerly owned by James Huggins Weeks, who was a Yaphank resident since 1827, and a former President of the Long Island Rail Road between 1847 and 1850. It was built in 1853 and was built to resemble The Old Grace Church in Massapequa. An extension on the east side of the church was added later on, but otherwise, it remains largely unchanged. The church was added to the National Register of Historic Places in 1988.
