= Hawkins Homestead =

Historic house in New York, United States

- U.S. National Register of Historic Places
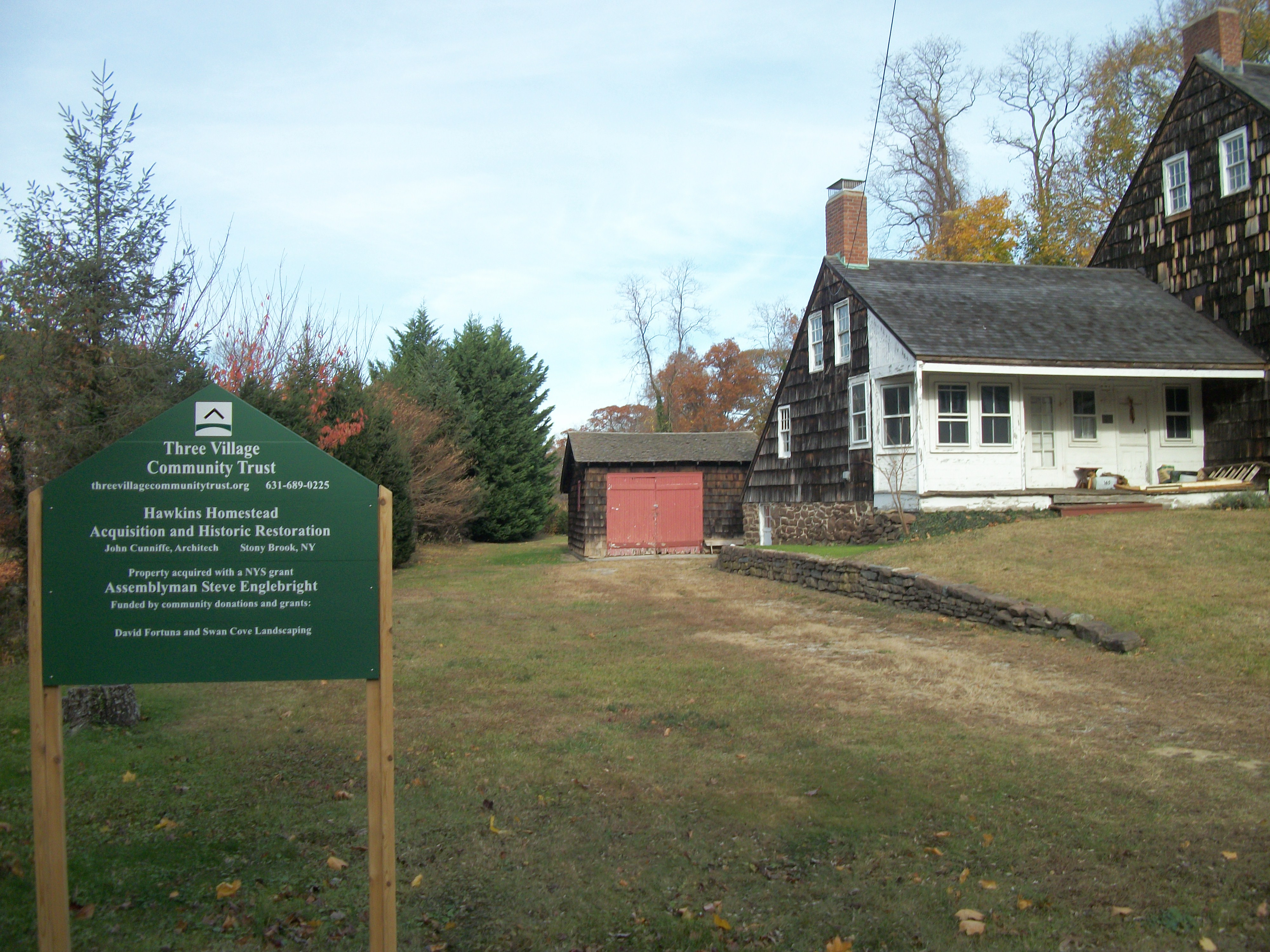
- The Zachariah Hawkins Homestead in Stony Brook, New York (2013), which the Three Village Community Trust planned to restore.

- Location within New York Location within the United States
- Nearest city: Stony Brook, New York
- Coordinates: 40°55′45″N 73°8′19″W
- Area: 0.8 acres (0.32 ha)
- Built: ca. 1660
- Architect: Hawkins, Zachariah
- Architectural style: New England saltbox
- NRHP reference No.: 88000727
- Added to NRHP: June 9, 1988

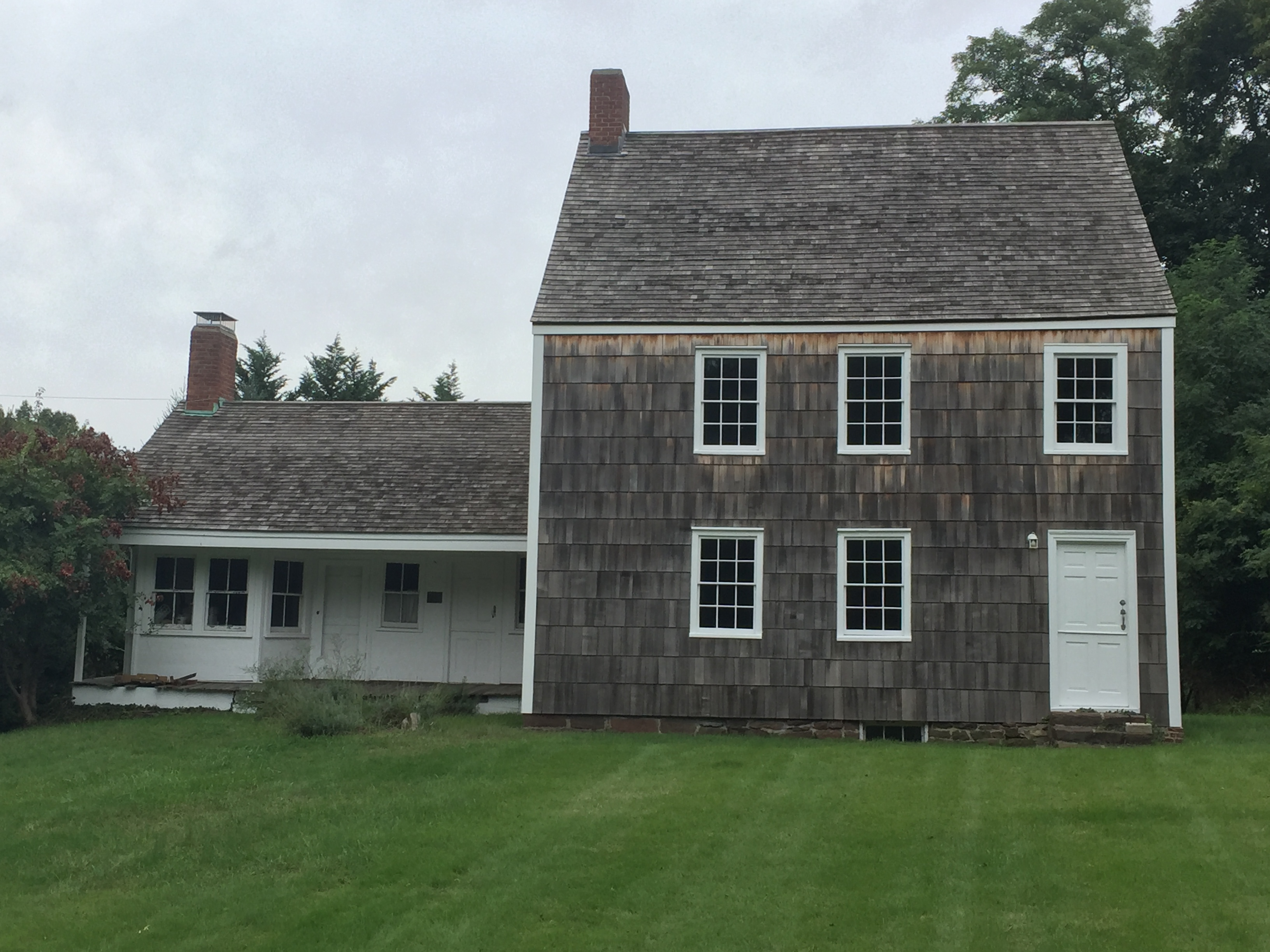
Hawkins Homestead, after 2018 restoration.

Hawkins Homestead, also known as the Zachariah Hawkins Homestead, is a historic home located at 165 Christian Avenue in Stony Brook in Brookhaven Town, Suffolk County, New York. It was built originally about 1660 and is a saltbox-form dwelling. It has two principal components: a mid-17th-century 1 1/2-story house to the west and a large mid-18th-century (c. 1720 and 1750) and early-19th-century (c. 1812) 2 1/2-story addition to the east.

It was added to the National Register of Historic Places in 1988. It is south-west of the Bethel–Christian Avenue–Laurel Hill Historical District at 165 Christian Ave.
