= United Methodist Church (Patchogue, New York) =

Historic church building in Patchogue, New York

- U.S. National Register of Historic Places
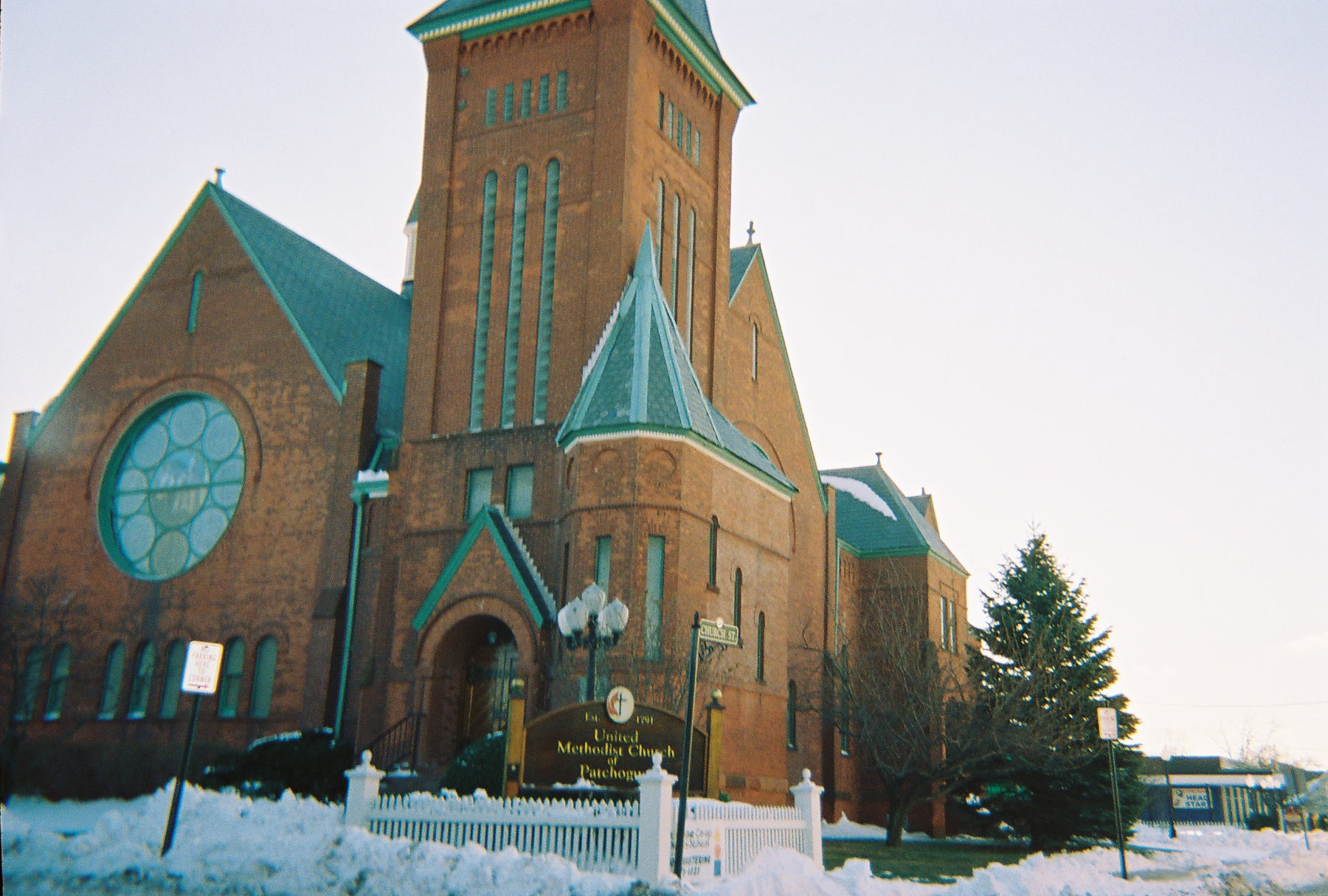
- The historic United Methodist Church on December 23, 2009.

- Location within New York Location within the United States
- Location: S. Ocean Ave. and Church St., Patchogue, New York
- Coordinates: 40°45′51.98″N 73°0′52.63″W
- Area: less than one acre
- Built: 1889
- Architect: Teale, Oscar
- Architectural style: Romanesque
- NRHP reference No.: 84003006
- Added to NRHP: April 19, 1984

Patchogue United Methodist Church is a historic United Methodist church at the southwest corner of South Ocean Avenue and Church Street in Patchogue, New York. The official address is 10 Church Street.

It was built in 1889, although the Methodists originally shared a church building with the Congregationalists between 1793 and 1832. The existing church building was added to the National Register of Historic Places in 1984.
