= Yaphank, New York =

- Hamlet and census-designated place
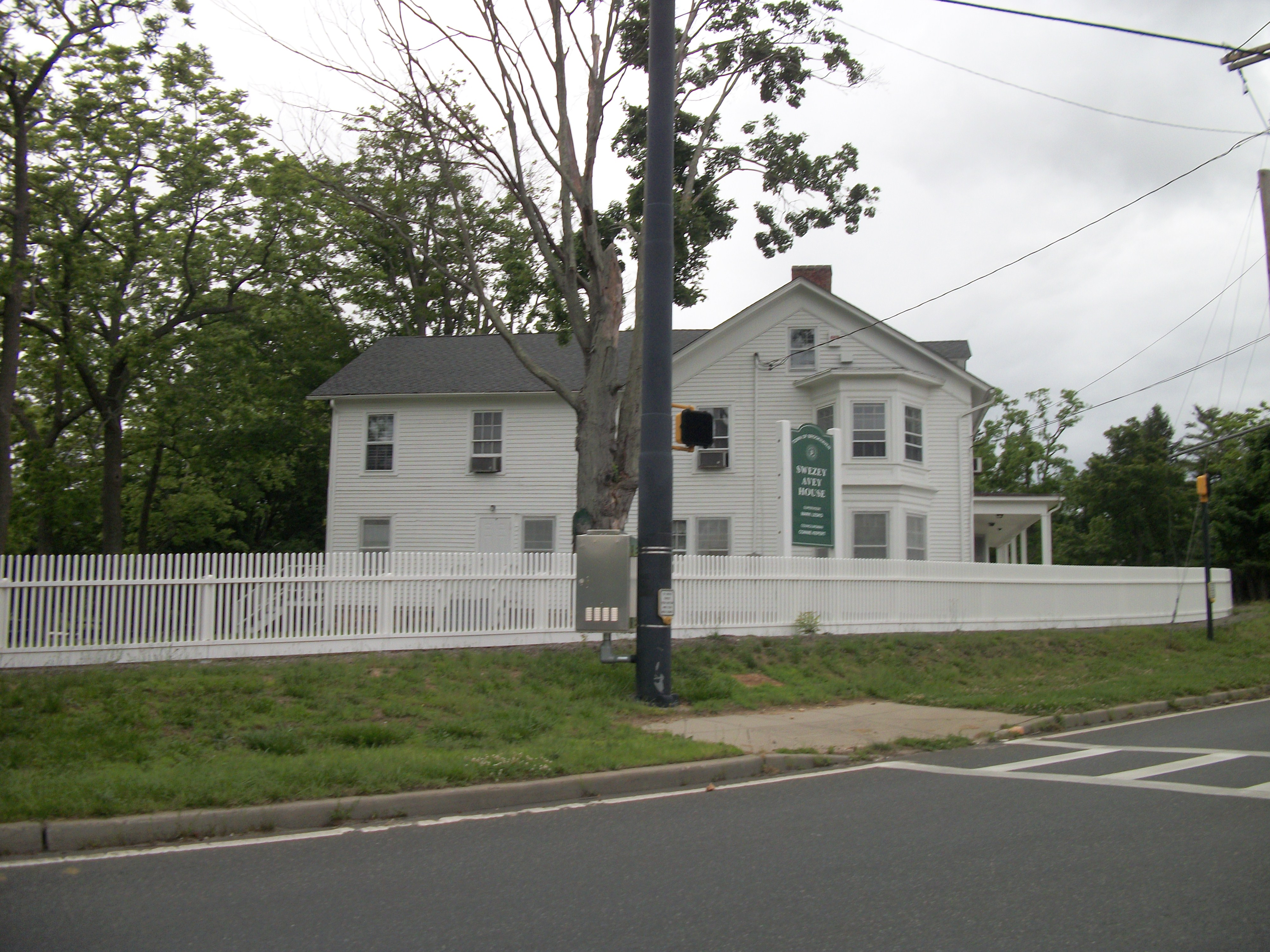
- The historic Swezey-Avey House on the southeast bank of Upper Yaphank Lake

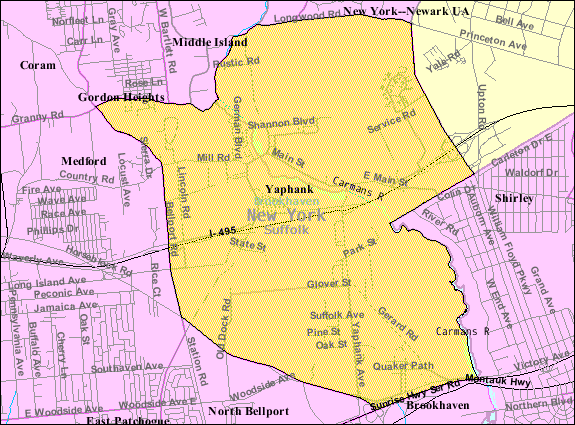
- U.S. Census map

- Location within the state of New York Yaphank (New York)
- Coordinates: 40°50′7″N 72°55′45″W
- Country: United States
- State: New York
- County: Suffolk

Area
  - Total: 13.8 sq mi (35.7 km^{2})
  - Land: 13.7 sq mi (35.4 km^{2})
  - Water: 0.12 sq mi (0.3 km^{2})
- Elevation: 43 ft (13 m)

Population (2020)
  - Total: 5,974
  - Density: 437/sq mi (169/km^{2})
- Time zone: UTC−05:00 (Eastern (EST))
  - Summer (DST): UTC−04:00 (EDT)
- ZIP Code: 11980
- Area codes: 631, 934
- FIPS code: 36-83426
- GNIS feature ID: 0971807

Yaphank (/ˈjæpæŋk/) is a hamlet and census-designated place (CDP) in Suffolk County, New York, United States. As of the 2020 census, Yaphank had a population of 5,974.

Yaphank is located in the south part of the Town of Brookhaven. It is served by the Longwood Central School District, except for extreme southwestern Yaphank, which is served by the South Country Central School District.

In the 1930s, Yaphank was a center of American Nazism where Camp Siegfried drew up to a thousand weekly visitors from New York City for pro-Nazi rallies and vacationing.

== History ==
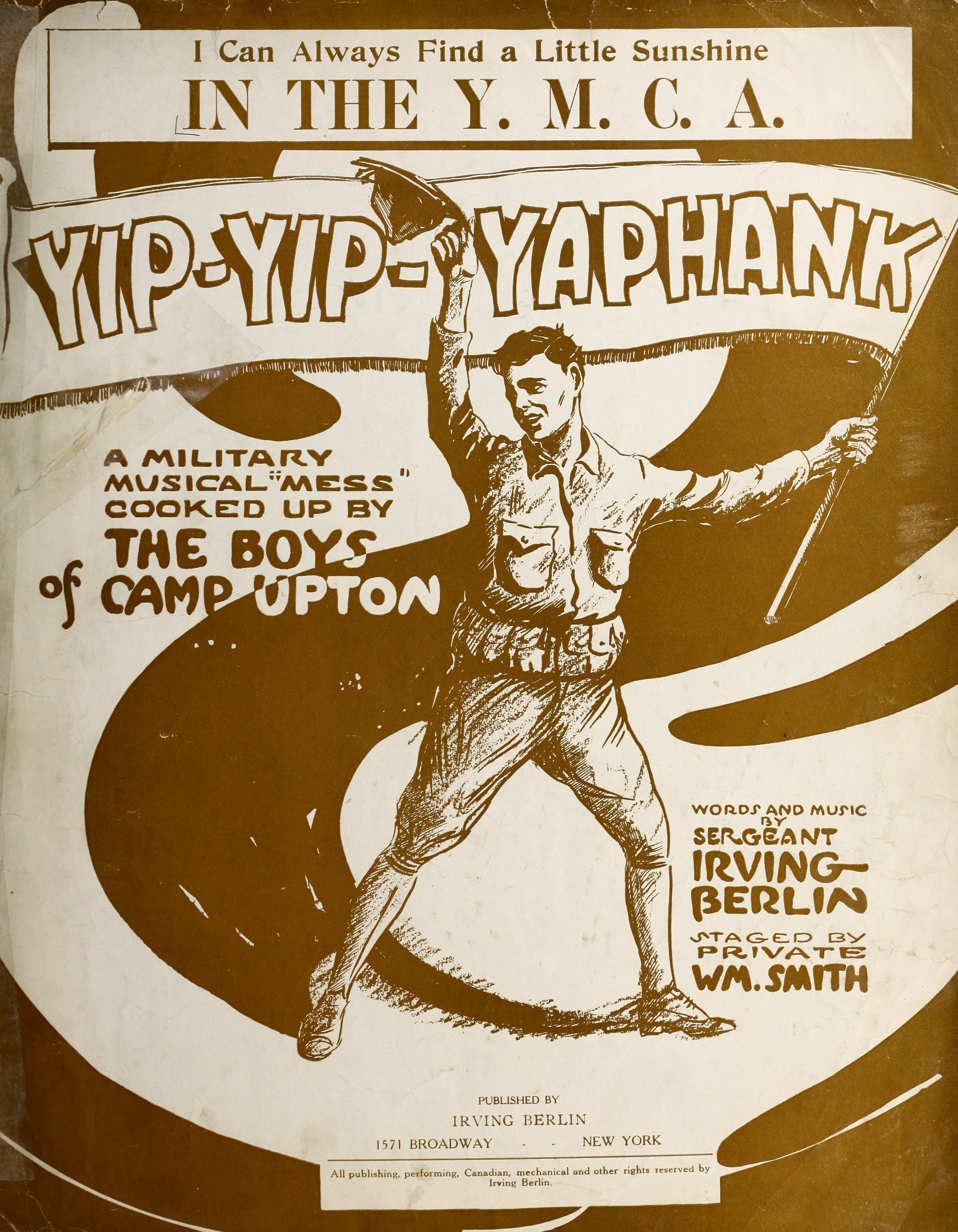
Sheet music of one of the songs featured in Yip Yip Yaphank (1918), the musical revue Sgt. Irving Berlin wrote at Camp Upton and took to Broadway

Captain Robert Robinson came to Yaphank and built his Dutch Colonial house with the building dated at 1726. He was then granted permission to dam the Carmans River to build a mill across the street from his house. The construction of this mill in 1739 was considered the founding date of the Hamlet of Yaphank.

In the mid-18th century, John Homan built two mills along the Carmans River, which runs directly through the center of the town. These two mills inspired the first name for the town: Millville. The translator-author Mary Louise Booth was born in Millville in 1831. In 1846 a post office was opened in the town, but because there were thirteen other towns named "Millville" in New York state at the time, the town was renamed "Yaphank", from the local Native American word Yamphanke, meaning "bank of a river".

In 1843 the Long Island Rail Road built a railroad station in Yaphank (still named Millville at the time), and nearly overnight the small mill town became a major commercial center. By 1875, Yaphank had two grist mills, two lumber mills, two blacksmith shops, a printing office, an upholstery shop, a stagecoach line, two medical doctors, a shoe shop, two wheelwright shops, a meat market, a dressmaker and a general store. In 2026, a new station was built, Yaphank-BNL, to replace the old station.

Today, Yaphank is home to about half of those industries. The grist mills, blacksmith, physician, shoe shop, wheelwright shops, meat markets and the dressmakers are long gone, although the rail road station is still there, along with the general stores. The hamlet is also home to the headquarters of Sokolin, a multi-generational fine-wine merchant founded in 1934.

Today, Yaphank holds three delis, one pizza shop, a shooting supply company, a skeet range, a bank, and a house moving company.

Yaphank was the home of Camp Upton, which was used as a boot camp in 1917. In 1947, the U.S. Department of War transferred the Camp Upton site to the Atomic Energy Commission, and it now serves as the home of Brookhaven National Laboratory. Before the end of World War I, more than 30,000 men received their basic training there, including songwriter Irving Berlin. It was there that Berlin composed the musical comedy revue Yip Yip Yaphank, which had a brief run on Broadway, and wrote the patriotic tune "God Bless America".

A quarter horse racing facility named Parr Meadows operated in Yaphank in 1977. The racetrack reopened in 1986 for a single meet, then called Suffolk Meadows. In 1979, Parr Meadows served as the venue of a tenth-anniversary reunion concert that featured many of the original performers from the Woodstock Festival.

A number of Suffolk County facilities are located in Yaphank, including Suffolk County Police Department headquarters, the county fire academy, and the Suffolk County Farm and Education Center, which offers a glimpse into the workings of an authentic 100-plus-year-old farm and educational programs by Cornell Cooperative Extension.

=== Camp Siegfried and Nazism ===
In the 1930s, Yaphank was home to Camp Siegfried, a summer camp that taught Nazi ideology. It was owned by the German American Bund, an American Nazi organization devoted to promoting a favorable view of Nazi Germany, and operated by the German American Settlement League (GASL).

Camp Siegfried was one of many such camps in the US in the 1930s, including Camp Hindenburg in Grafton, Wisconsin, Camp Nordland in Andover, New Jersey, and Deutschhorst Country Club in Sellersville, Pennsylvania.

Until 2017, homes in the former Camp Siegfried area, on land that was owned by the German-American Settlement League, were under covenants restricting residents to those of German extraction only.

== Geography ==
According to the United States Census Bureau, the CDP has a total area of 13.8 square miles (35.7 km^{2}), of which 13.7 square miles (35.4 km^{2}) is land and 0.12 square miles (0.3 km^{2}), or 0.89%, is water.

== Demographics ==
As of the census of 2000, there were 5,025 people, 1,566 households, and 1,130 families residing in the CDP. The population density was 359.5 inhabitants per square mile (138.8/km^{2}). There were 1,650 housing units at an average density of 118.0 per square mile (45.6/km^{2}). The racial makeup of the CDP was 85.11% White, 11.22% African American, 0.24% Native American, 1.03% Asian, 0.04% Pacific Islander, 0.94% from other races, and 1.41% from two or more races. Hispanic or Latino of any race were 7.34% of the population.

There were 1,566 households, out of which 33.5% had children under the age of 18 living with them, 55.5% were married couples living together, 11.9% had a female householder with no husband present, and 27.8% were non-families. 21.9% of all households were made up of individuals, and 6.8% had someone living alone who was 65 years of age or older. The average household size was 2.69 and the average family size was 3.14.

In the CDP, the population was spread out, with 21.9% under the age of 18, 8.0% from 18 to 24, 34.6% from 25 to 44, 24.0% from 45 to 64, and 11.6% who were 65 years of age or older. The median age was 37 years. For every 100 females, there were 115.3 males. For every 100 females age 18 and over, there were 118.1 males.

The median income for a household in the CDP was $70,534, and the median income for a family was $72,348. Males had a median income of $48,807 versus $35,406 for females. The per capita income for the CDP was $25,020. About 3.3% of families and 3.8% of the population were below the poverty line, including 4.8% of those under age 18 and 4.7% of those age 65 or over.

== Education ==
Most of Yaphank is served by the Longwood Central School District, with some parts also served by the South Country Central School District.

== Notable people ==
- Mary Louise Booth, an American editor, translator, and writer; the first editor-in-chief of the women's fashion magazine Harper's Bazaar.
- Fred Hembeck (born 1953), comic book writer and illustrator

== See also ==
- Brookhaven Rail Terminal
- Robert Hawkins Homestead
- Homan-Gerard House and Mills
- St. Andrew's Episcopal Church (Yaphank, New York)
- Suffolk County Almshouse Barn
