= West Meadow Beach Historic District =

Historic district in New York, United States

- Formerly listed on the U.S. National Register of Historic Places
- U.S. Historic district
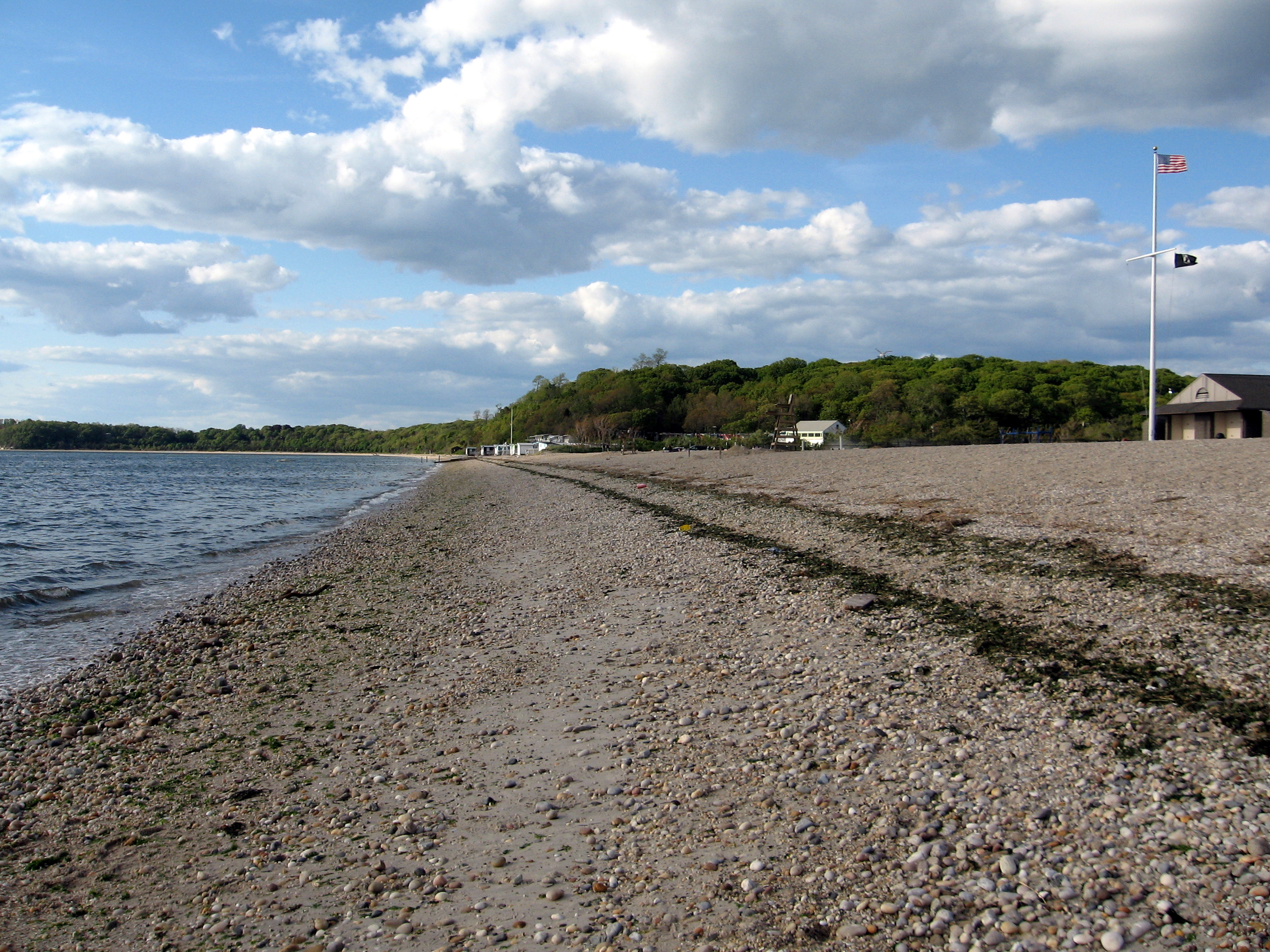
- The shoreline of the West Meadow Beach Historic District, with a few cottages

- Location within New York Location within the United States
- Nearest city: Stony Brook, New York
- Coordinates: 40°55′59″N 73°8′48″W
- Architectural style: Bungalow/Craftsman
- NRHP reference No.: 04001195

Significant dates
- Added to NRHP: October 28, 2004
- Removed from NRHP: June 24, 2022

West Meadow Beach Historic District is a peninsula of public parkland approximately 1.5 miles long and a former national historic district located in northwestern Stony Brook in Suffolk County, New York. The district through much of the 20th century contained 120 summer cottages built along West Meadow Beach on Long Island Sound. Most were constructed during the 1920s and 1930s (although some are dated much earlier and others were rebuilt as late as the 1980s), under deeds provided as political favors.

In 1979 a state court ruled that the cottages were illegal, as the underlying property was public parkland. All but four of the cottages were removed in 2004. The remaining ones are being adapted for public purposes.

== History ==
In the early part of the century, including through the 1920s, lots along the beach were leased out by the Town and people built summer cottages. Some families who owned these cottages returned to the beach annually for decades.

In 1976 the Brookhaven Town Board resolved to dedicate all of the peninsula as a town park, including the beach. There had long been complaints by residents about the cottages on the public land and the privileges held by their lessees. The beach shoreline was open to the public although some of the upper areas near the road were occupied by the seasonal cottages. The central portion of the beach near the parking lot was staffed by licensed lifeguards during the summer season and a small public building provided the facilities.

In 1979 a State Supreme Court ruled that these privately held cottages were illegally sited on, and therefore alienating, public parkland owned by the Town of Brookhaven. Years of controversy followed as local people pushed to have the cottages moved off the parkland.

In 1996 Assemblyman Steve Englebright gained passage of a bill to allow a short extension of the leases (8 years) in exchange for allowing the Town to use the rents collected during that time period for costs associated with removing the structures before 2005. The cottage holders relinquished title under the bill. Their $7,000-a-year lease payments were collected for a fund to pay for the demolition of the cottages and construction of a park. During this period, the Town collected about $1.8 million for each project. The funds for park restoration could also be used to protect this ecosystem, and educate the public in understanding the value of this significant coastal salt marsh habitat.

In part to resist the state court order and subsequent state legislation to restore the public parkland and beach, the cottage "leaseholders" worked with allies to have the entire peninsula and its cottages added to the National Register of Historic Places as a National Historic District, which was achieved on October 28, 2004. By that time, 92 cottages remained. They were an example of historic uses that did not exist in many places. Despite this, the state court-mandated removal orders took precedence. The historic district was removed from the National Register in 2022.

In December 2004, the remaining residents were evicted, the cottages were removed, and the process was begun to restore the beach. A total of four cottages were preserved for adaptive re-use for various public purposes. Three are reserved for use by the Brookhaven Town Parks Department, Public Safety Department, and Division of Environmental Protection, to assist in ecosystem protection of this parkland and in education of the public.

Located at the southern tip of the peninsula known as Shipman's Point, the most significant historic structure, the noted Gamecock Cottage (c. 1876) with Victorian-style architecture, was likewise preserved. The Gamecock Cottage is being restored by the town government. It will be protected under a stewardship agreement with a non-profit community organization, the Three Village Community Trust.

Public parking off West Meadow Lane (formerly called Trustees Road) is available in the northern section of the peninsula near the active Town Beach, also known as the Joel L. Lefkowitz Park at West Meadow Beach. It is open to Town of Brookhaven residents for free and during the beach season, to non-residents on a daily fee basis. A small center is open on the marsh side for viewing and programs.

== Wildlife ==
West Meadow's mile-long beach, maritime forest, and 88-acre nearby tidal salt marshes and wetlands along West Meadow Creek have been designated the West Meadow Wetlands Reserve. This wildlife reserve provides a habitat to a number of shore birds and song birds species, inclusive of the endangered piping plover and least terns, as well as egrets, black-crowned night herons, and osprey. It is designated as a New York State Significant Coastal Fish & Wildlife Habitat, and a Long Island Sound Study Stewardship Area. In 2006, the West Meadow Beach Restoration Master Plan was initiated to guide the project.

Varieties of song birds identified in the brushy areas along the creek include the following:

- Chipping Sparrows and Song Sparrows
- Yellow, Blue Winged and Prairie Warblers
- House and Carolina Wrens
- Yellow and Black Billed Cuckoos
- Brown Thrashers, Mockingbirds and Grey Catbirds
- House and Gold Finches
- Downy and Red Bellied Woodpeckers
- Baltimore Orioles
- Cedar Waxwings and Eastern Kingbird

With its combination of tidal saltwater marsh around West Meadow Creek, the beach strip and Long Island Sound, the park attracts numerous wildlife photographers. In the spring the edges of the long beach are filled with mating horseshoe crabs, an ancient species.

The Pavilion, the site for environmental programs, is located on the marsh side. A ranger and environmental educator assigned to the park leads such programs for children and adults, including moonlight walks and seasonal programs to view migrating species. Boy Scouts can participate in programs to satisfy environmental, forestry and oceanography badges. Since 2009, young men from local high schools have built three chimney swift towers near the parking lot and three bat houses in the park, to provide nesting areas to attract important species that help control mosquitoes and are struggling with loss of habitat.

In 2011 the town undertook a project to eradicate a batch of invasive perennial pepperweed found among the beach plants.
