= Suffolk County Almshouse Barn =

- U.S. National Register of Historic Places
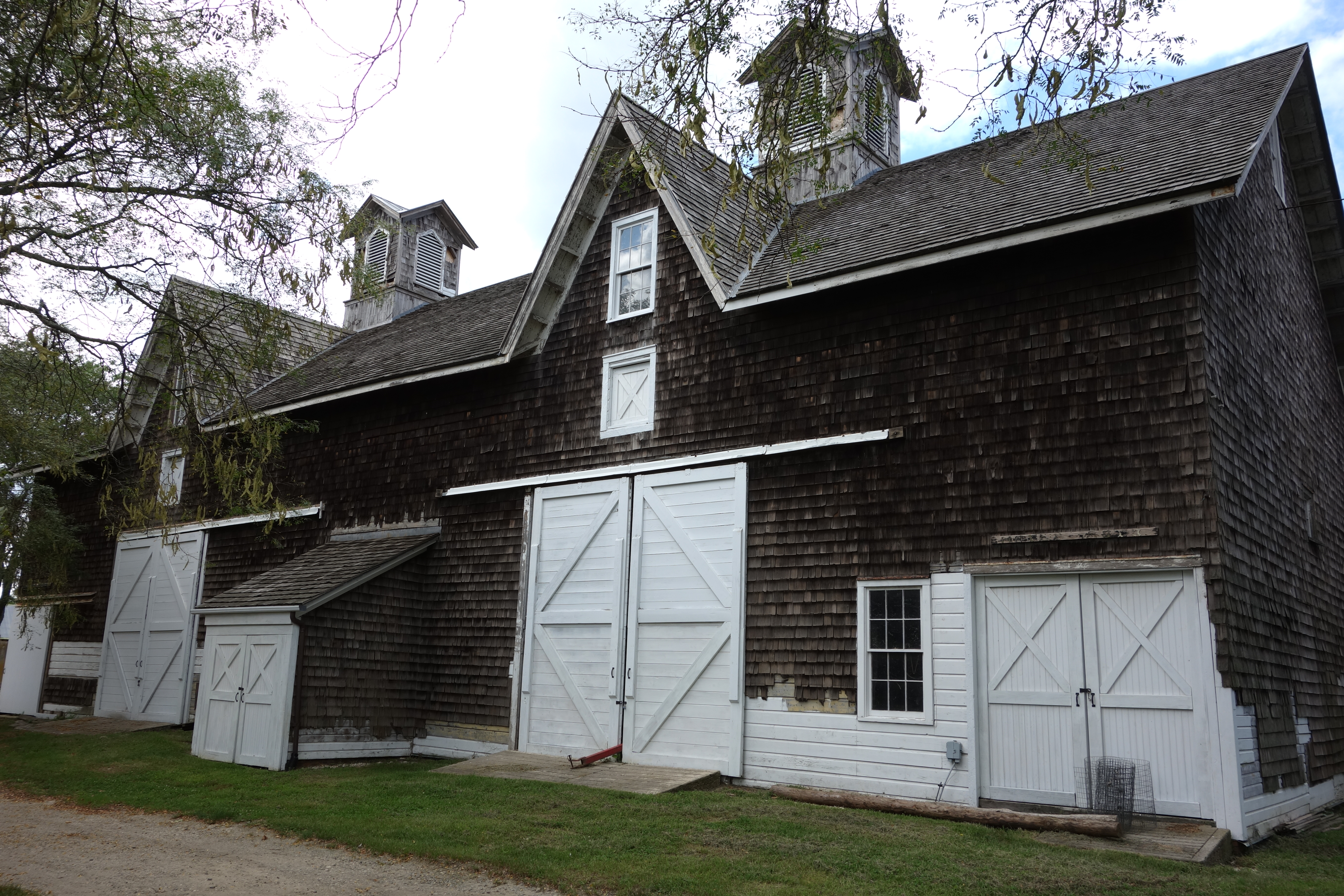

- Location within New York Location within the United States
- Location: Yaphank Ave., Yaphank, New York
- Coordinates: 40°49′41″N 72°55′18″W
- Area: less than one acre
- Built: 1871
- Architect: Hallett, Charles
- Architectural style: Late Victorian, Victorian Picturesque
- NRHP reference No.: 86002512
- Added to NRHP: September 11, 1986

Suffolk County Almshouse Barn is a historic hay and livestock barn located at Yaphank in Suffolk County, New York. It was built in 1871 and the large multi-story barn has a broad gable roof and wood shingle sheathing. It is the only extant structure from the Suffolk County Almshouse.

It was added to the National Register of Historic Places in 1986.
