= Congregational Church of Patchogue =

Historic church in New York, United States

- U.S. National Register of Historic Places
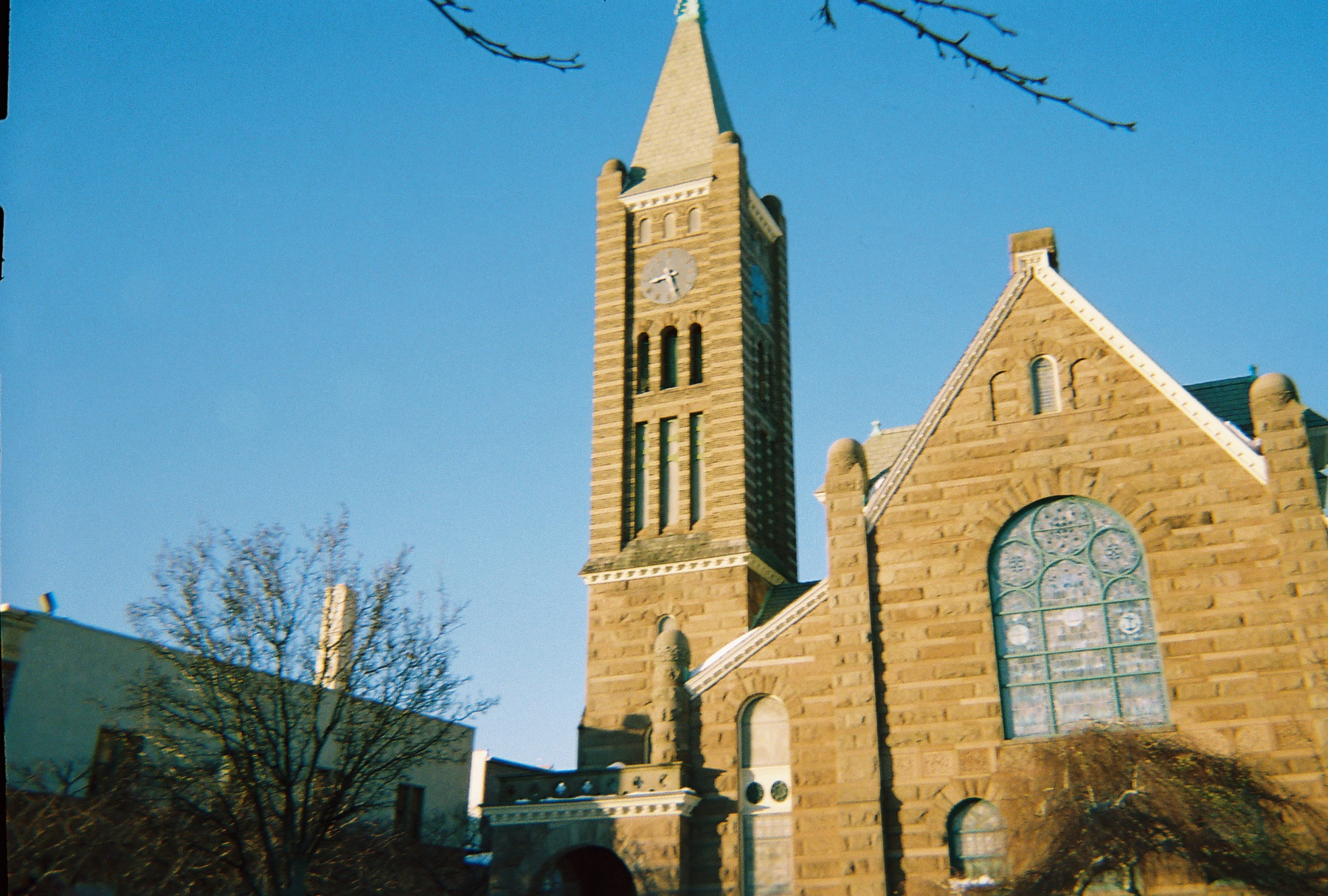
- The clock tower of the Congregational Church of Patchogue

- Location within New York Location within the United States
- Location: 95 East Main Street; Patchogue, New York
- Coordinates: 40°45′57″N 73°0′47″W
- Area: less than one acre
- Built: 1892
- Architect: Valk, Lawrence B., & Sons
- Architectural style: Romanesque
- NRHP reference No.: 93000279
- Added to NRHP: April 1, 1993

Congregational Church of Patchogue is a historic church at 95 East Main Street in Patchogue, New York.

Though the current church building was built in 1892, the church itself dates back to 1793 in a small building, approximately 25 by 20 feet, that was shared with some local Methodists. Even after constructing a new building in 1820, the Congregationalists and Methodists shared the church building until 1832. A third location for the Congregationalists was built on the corner of Lake Street and North Ocean Avenue in 1854. The fourth and present building was added to the National Register of Historic Places in 1993.
