= St. James Chapel (Stony Brook, New York) =

- U.S. National Register of Historic Places
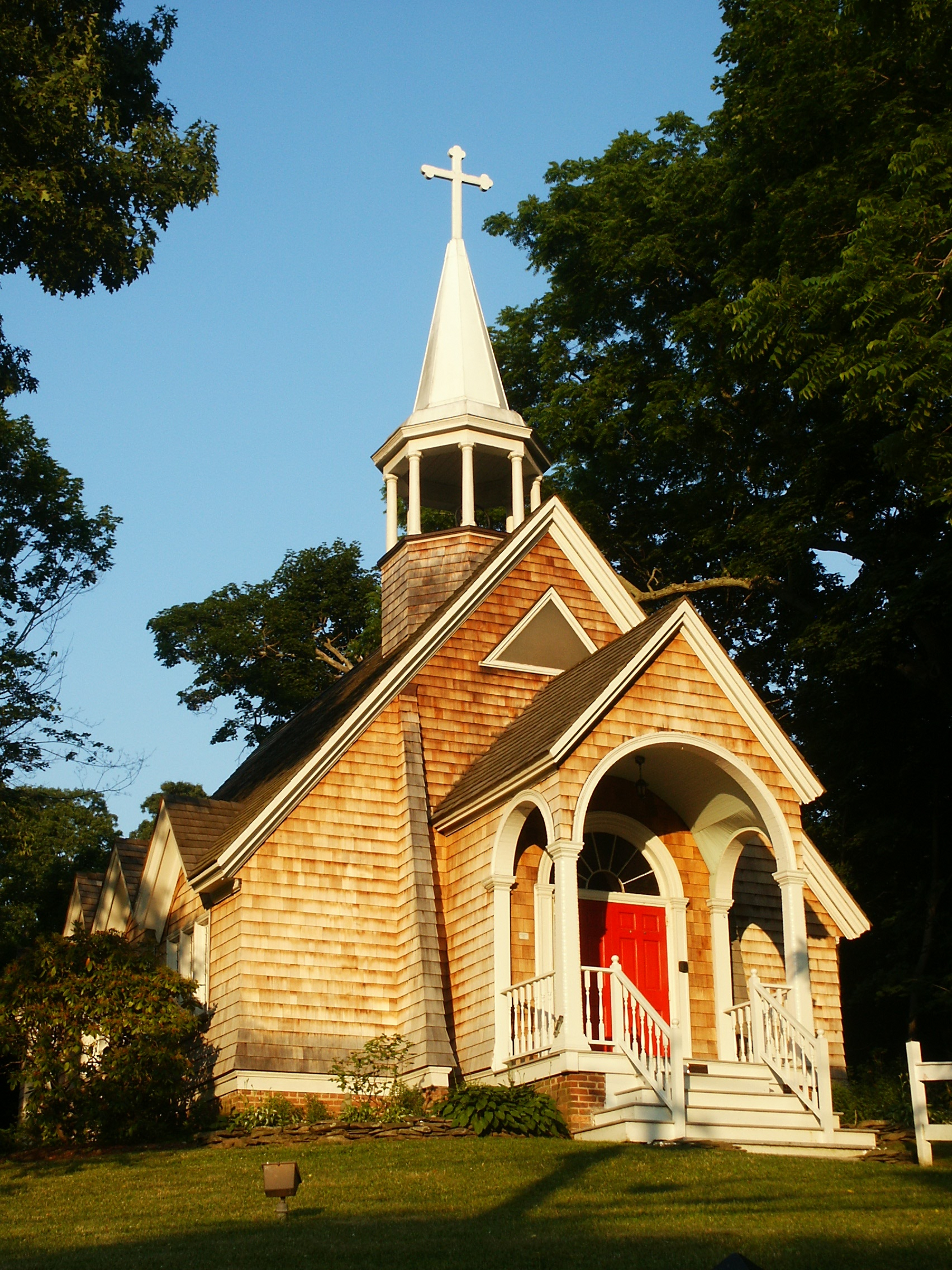

- Location within New York Location within the United States
- Location: E. side of Main St., 250 ft. N. of Stony Brook Ln., Stony Brook, New York
- Coordinates: 40°54′56″N 73°8′50″W
- Area: less than one acre
- Built: 1889
- Architect: White, Sanford E.
- Architectural style: Queen Anne
- NRHP reference No.: 00000583
- Added to NRHP: June 16, 2000

St. James Chapel, now All Souls Episcopal Church, is a historic chapel on the east side of Main Street (Suffolk CR 68), 250 feet north of Stony Brook Lane in Stony Brook, New York. The church was built in 1889 and is a gable-roofed frame building clad in wood shingles. It features an open, octagonal bell tower, cross gables, and an arcaded porch. It was designed by architect Stanford White.

It was added to the National Register of Historic Places in 2000.
