= Bethel–Christian Avenue–Laurel Hill Historical District =

- U.S. National Register of Historic Places
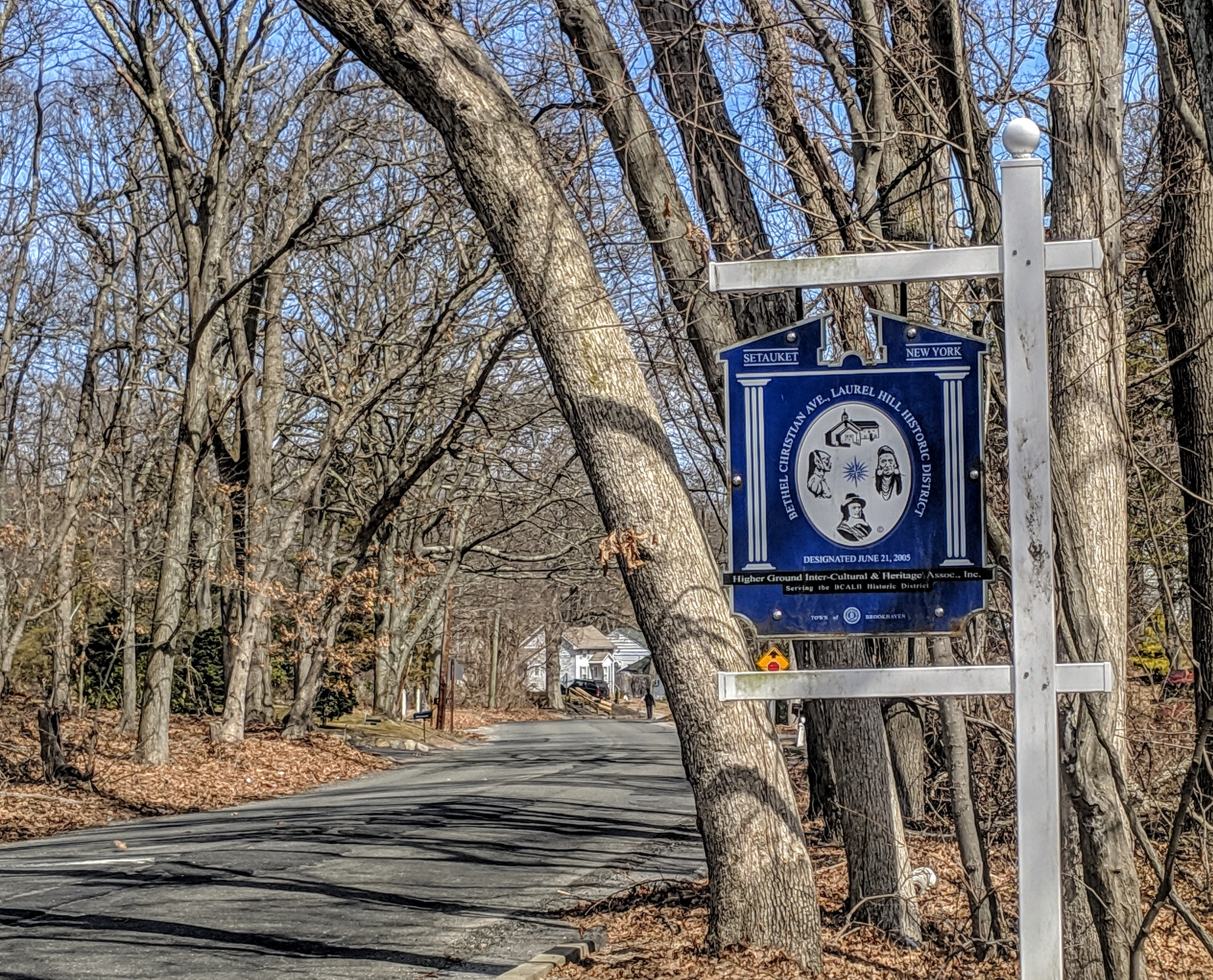
- BCALHC sign Historic district

- Location within New York
- Location: Christian Ave., Setauket, New York
- Coordinates: 40°56′30″N 73°07′12″W
- Area: 7.5 acres (3.0 ha)
- Built: 1848
- Architectural style: Classical Revival
- NRHP reference No.: 100001808
- Added to NRHP: November 09, 2017

Bethel–Christian Avenue–Laurel Hill Historical District is a Setauket, Long Island, New York neighborhood that was nominated for preservation as an endangered historic site in 2017.

The Bethel–Christian Avenue–Laurel Hill District on Long Island's north shore has roots back to the 1600s, when displaced African-American slaves and Native Americans from the Setalcott tribe settled in the area.

The historical district includes Bethel AME Church and the Laurel Hill Cemetery.

== Early history ==

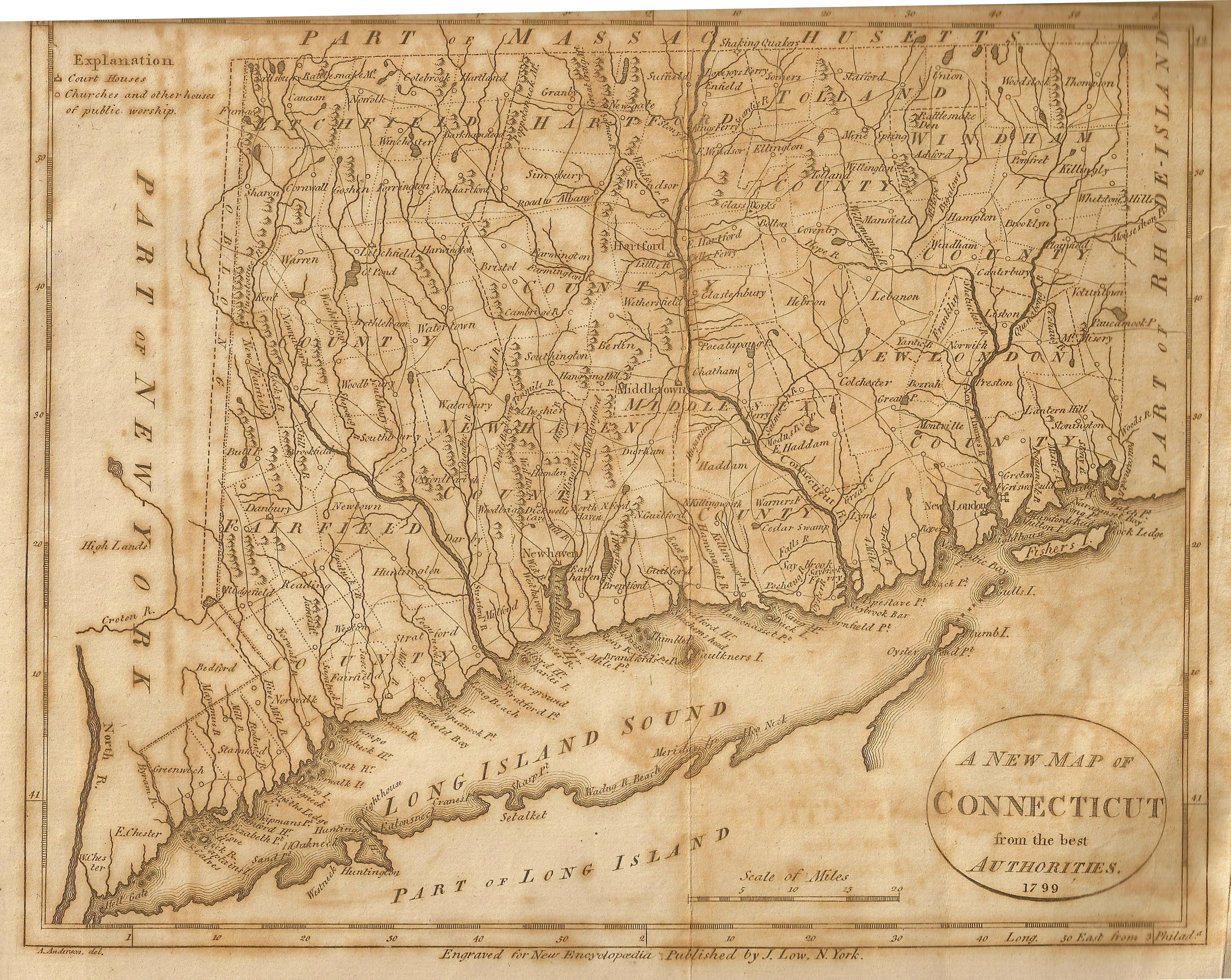

Colonists from New England purchased land in 1655 from the Setalcott Indians and began peaceably living there at what was then a 'tract of land extending from Stony Brook to and including Port Jefferson'.

During the Revolutionary War Setauket Harbor was across Long Island Sound from Fairfield, Connecticut. The British had consolidated their hold on New York City and Long Island during the winter months of early 1777, while the Continental Army established a land blockade around the city in New Jersey, southern New York, and southwestern Connecticut. On the night of August 21, Colonel Samuel Blachley Webb and his regiment set out across Long Island Sound in whaleboats, taking a few small brass cannons. Early the next morning they landed at Crane's Neck (in present-day Old Field, just west of Setauket), and marched to Setauket. The resulting battle ended when the Minutemen could not breach the breastworks around the Presbyterian meeting house and they retreated across the sound with a few dozen trophy horses and some quilts.

An 1853 document states that in the year 1815, slave owners Isaac Satterly and Benjamin F. Thompson took legal action to designate land along Christian Avenue, in Setauket, as a cemetery for people of color. This site is still known as Laurel Hill Cemetery, which has been under the trusteeship of Bethel AME Church since 1871.

In 1848 A tract of land was deeded to the Bethel AME, for the site of the original church, which was destroyed by fire in 1871. Old Bethel Cemetery on Christian Avenue in Stony Brook was the location of the first Bethel AME Church in the area. This deed provided 1/8th acre of land to the church board for a church. A line of stones lying on the ground behind the front of a line of gravestones marks the building's original foundation. The church moved to the current location in 1871 and the new church was built in 1874. It was also in 1871 that the trustees took control of the Laurel Hill Cemetery. The new church was destroyed by fire in 1909 but was quickly rebuilt.

== Setalcott Indians ==
Preservations acknowledged the area is one of the last remaining intact communities that represents the African-American and Native American population on Long Island. MAP – BCALH

The indigenous Setalcott Native American tribe were in Setalket when Europeans first landed. The sachems Warawakmy and Mahue gave permission for land use to the whites, who subsequently brought African slaves to the Town of Brookhaven about the year 1670. Subsequent generations of Setalcotts and Africans intermarried, the Harts and the Sells, Eato, Lewis, Edwards, Phillips, Scott, Green, Seaman, Young, and Tobias families forming a blend of natives and blacks. Most found work as servants and laborers, the population was organized, economically stable, and has persisted into the present. They were prohibited at the time from living elsewhere in the district and the pastoral guidance of the church created a community separate from the whites.

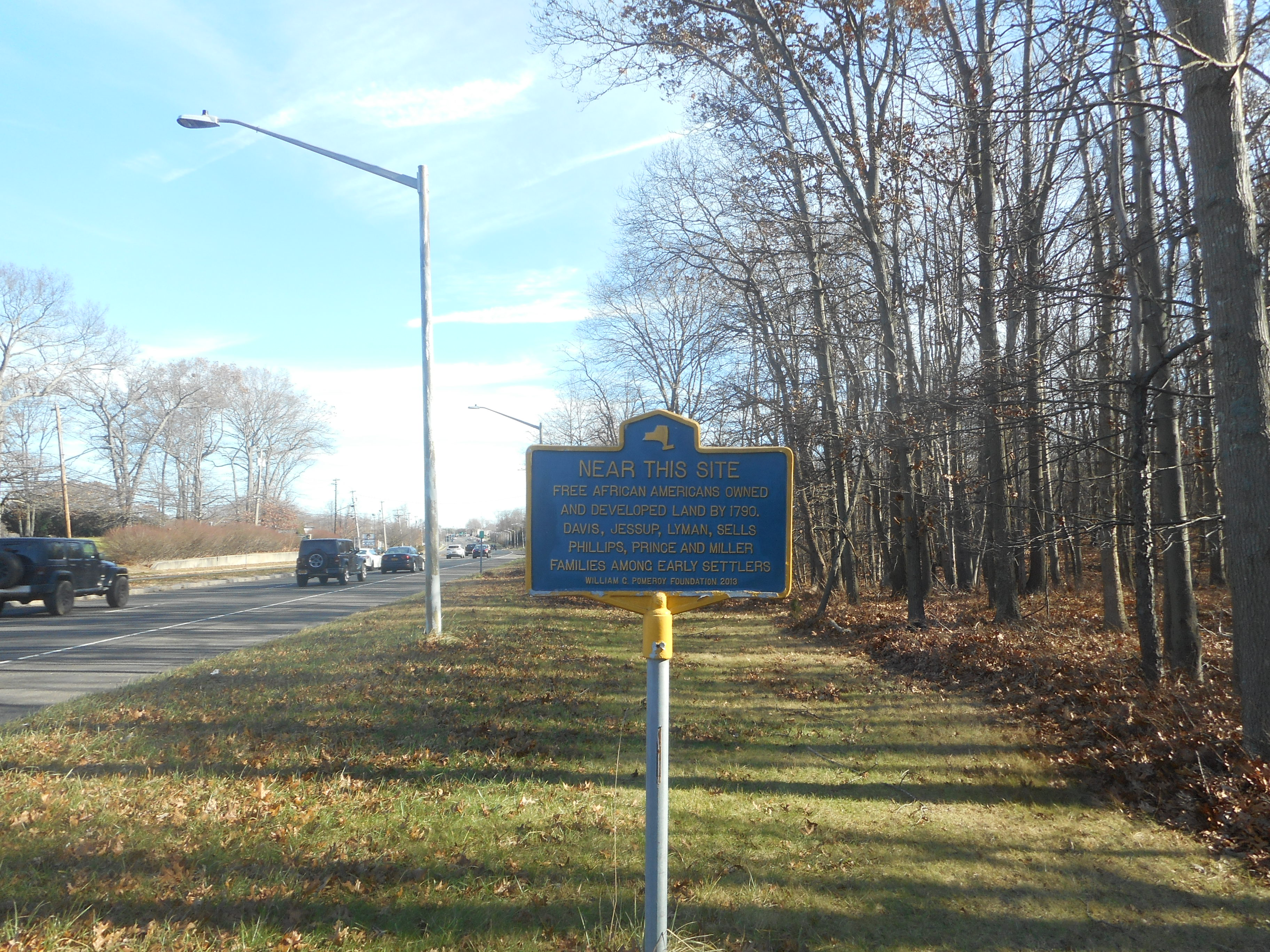
Freed Afro-American Community in Rocky Point HM

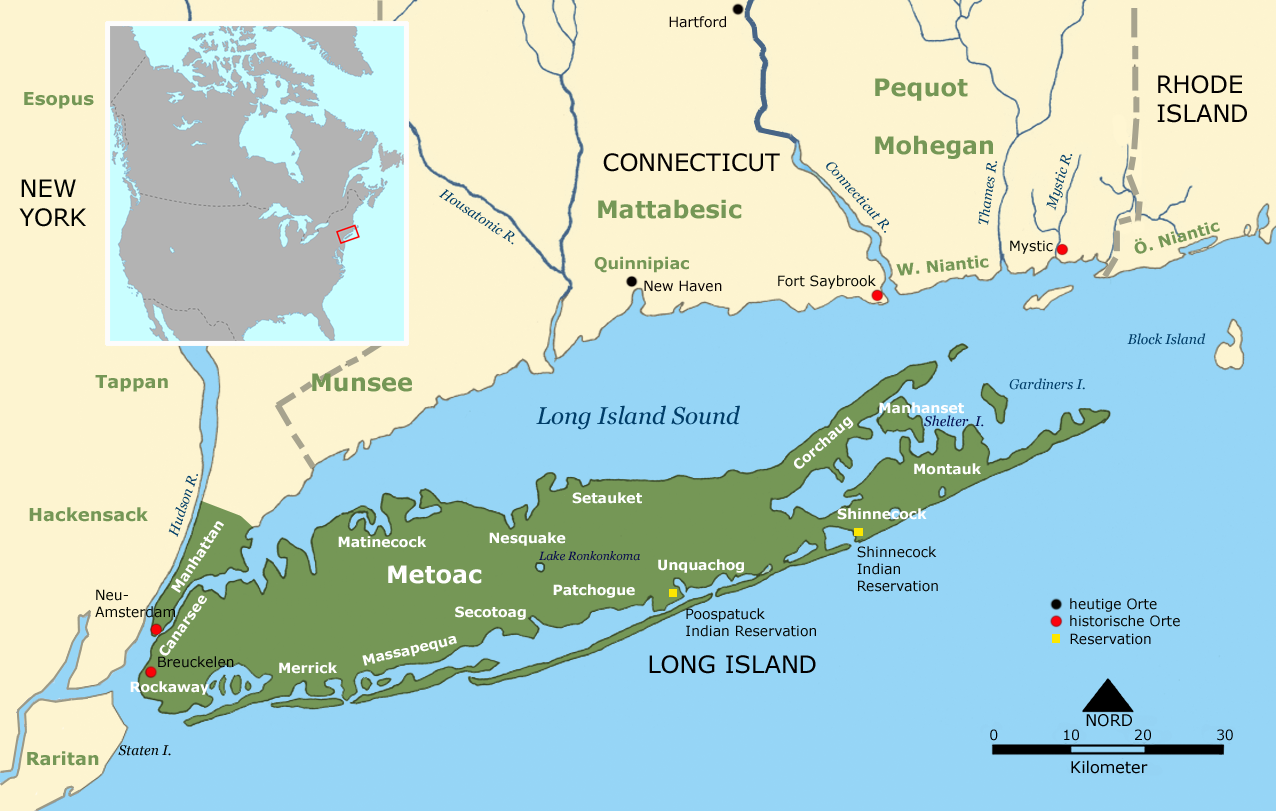
Long Island

The BCALH historic district was designated in 2005 and is an attempt at preserving the history and culture of the people still living in that area. The Christian Avenue community is a "distinct and indigenous way of life that has survived in Setauket for centuries." Threatened in 2007 a community group was formed to get further recognition for the area, aided by preservationists and archeologists at Stony Brook University the documentation needed for its survival was archived and catalogued. The district's predominantly Native and African American homes were not included in any of the Three Village historic districts and was not protected by any preservation laws. Setauket gentrified in the late 20th century, and some homes have been sold and demolished. They are removed from historical memory and subsequently excluded from the historic preservation measures that protect other sites in Old Setauket, the presence of the minority community gets smaller with each decade. The active efforts by community members, local school groups and college students culminated in the historical preservation project called- 'A Long Time Coming'. The goals were to help BCALH resist a common trend of historic minority community displacements across the United States by tax increases and gentrification which caused them to be pushed out from where they have been for generations.

During the period from 1867 to 1960 there were three 'eras' to the community which was then known as Chicken Hill, a one square mile patch of Christian Ave with the A.M.E. Church as the hub. At one point the multi-ethnic blend of Native Americans, African-Americans, Eastern and Western European immigrants made it one of the most diverse communities on Long Island. The presence of the Piano factory which later became the rubber factory led to the employment of the largest labor force in Suffolk county at Brookhaven Rubber Company, consisting mainly of Irish and other European immigrant transplants from the lower east side.

Developments include the Christian Avenue School – Original buildings dating back from earlier part of the century which were used for Kindergarten and 1st grade before closing in late 1970s. They were demolished and redeveloped as residential homes in the 1990s.

The BCALH historic district stood out from other sites in Long Island because it recognized both the historic and the cultural significance of the blended Native and African American community. The district includes the Laurel Hill cemetery, the church, an American Legion building and 30 homes.

The Setalcott tribe is not recognized by the Bureau of Indian Affairs (BIA) due to the size of the remaining tribe members and their self-identification.

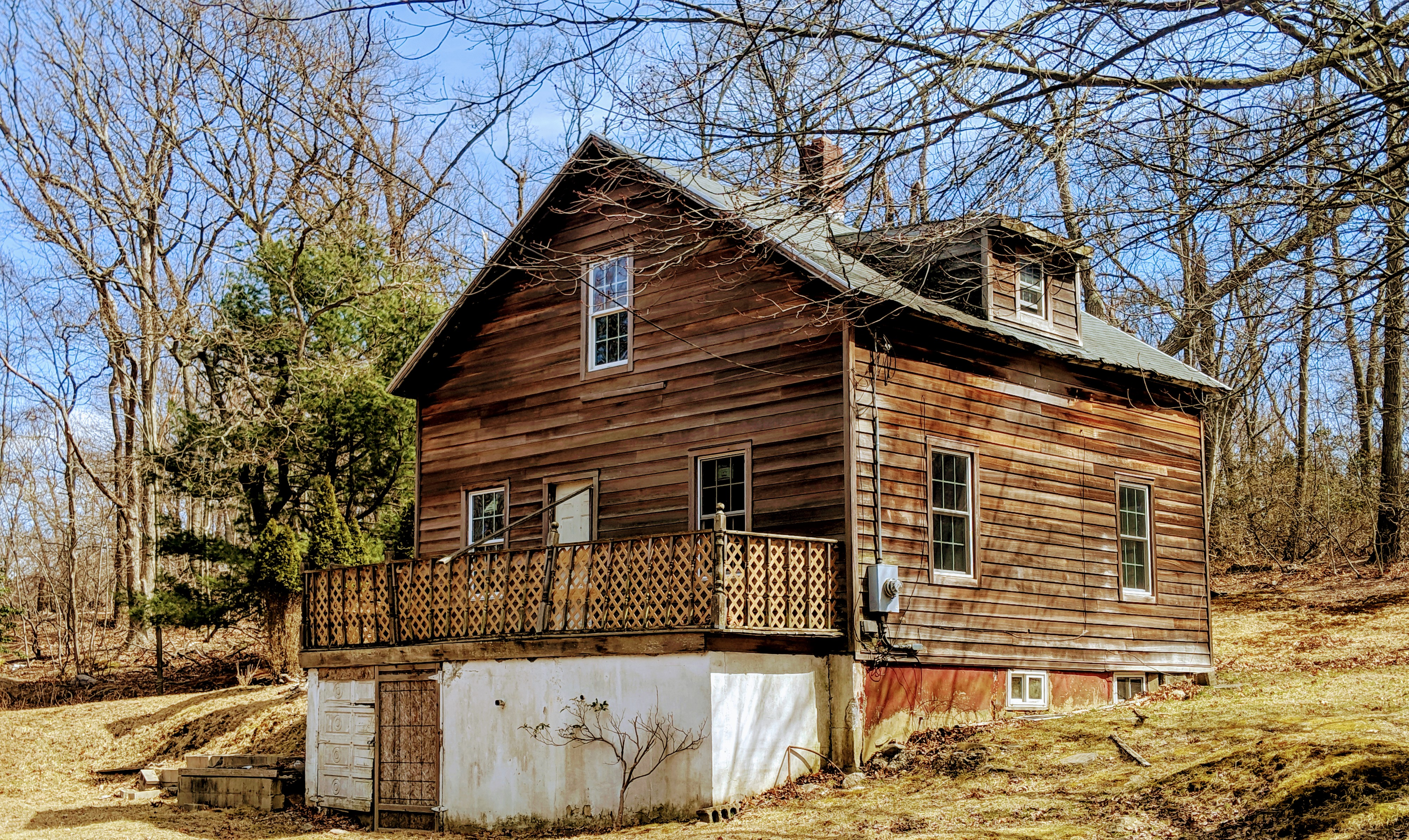
Rev David Eato House

== Eato house ==
The home of one of Bethel AME Church's first pastors has been recently added to the Society for the Preservation of Long Island Antiquities List of Endangered Historic Places. Richard Hawkins, a local resident had owned the property, He was known as a broker for African-American buyers who during the Jim Crow era could not get a loan from traditional sources.

The Rev David Eato's House is located in BCALH's District and is currently owned by the Bethel African Methodist Episcopal Church and was proposed to be restored by the society. Eato, one of the church's first pastors, and his wife Mary Baker, a freed slave from the south lived there until the 1930s. Bethel AME historian, Carlton "Hub" Edwards, said when Mary moved to the North after being freed from slavery she settled in Port Washington where she was an organist at a church. It was there that she met Eato and, after marrying, the couple moved to Setauket and the reverend became one of the first ministers of Setauket's Bethel AME in the early 1900s. Mary took on the role of superintendent of the Sunday school and held the position until the late 1930s.

== The Hawkins Homestead ==
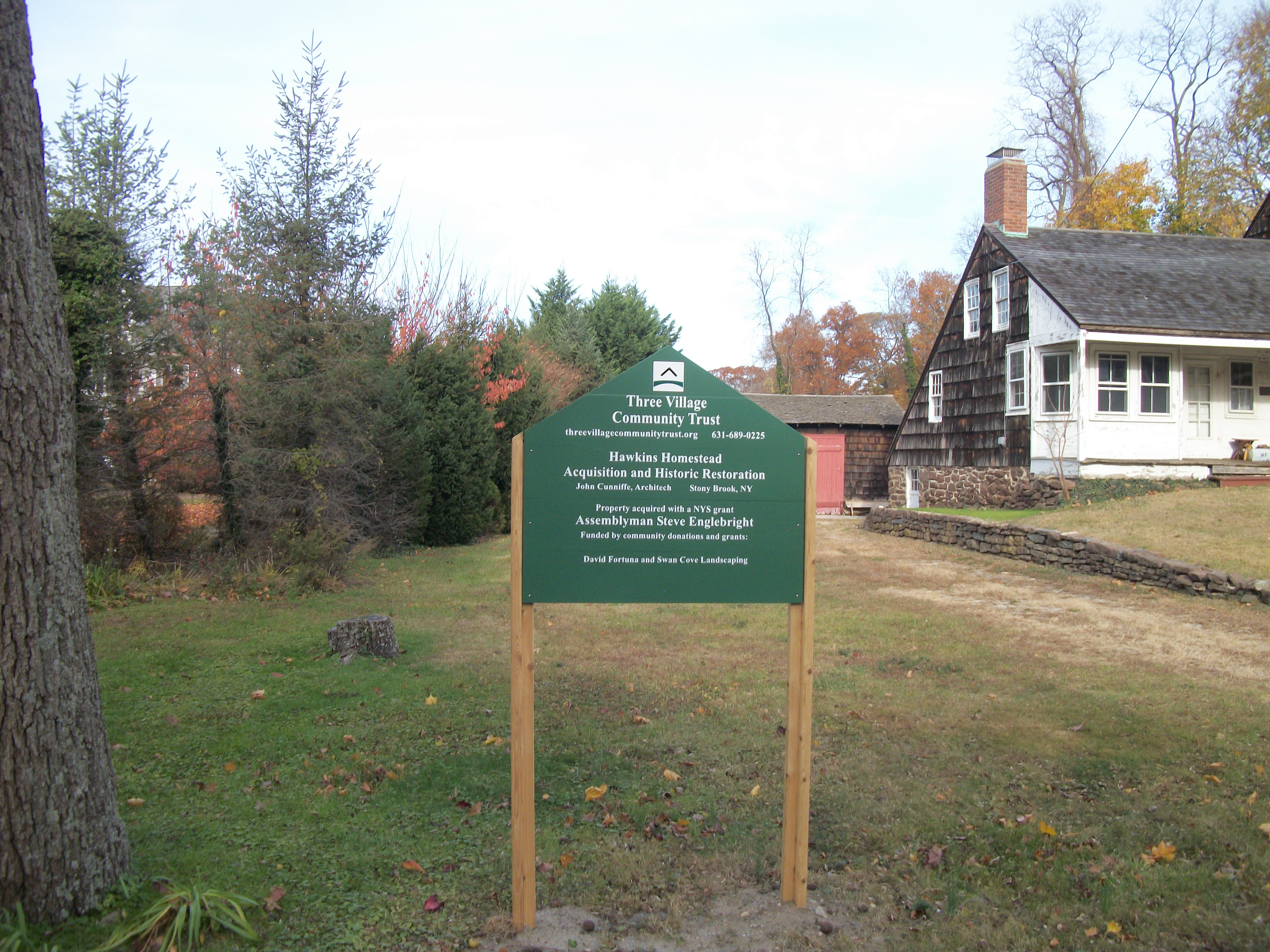

In 2013 the Three Village Community trust acquired the Hawkins Homestead which was listed on the National Register of Historic Places in 1988. It is on Christian Avenue in Setauket.

== Patriots Rock ==
On the other side of Lake Street is the lower half of the Setauket Mill Pond with Main Street on the opposite shore. 1/2 mile down Main Street is Patriots Rock at 108–114 Main Street, East Setauket. It is part of the larger Old Setauket Historical District. There is a plaque memorialising it as the spot where Col. Webb fired his cannons during the Revolutionary War.

== In popular culture ==
- Setauket is the principal setting of the AMC television drama TURN, which premiered in 2014 and tells the story of the Culper Spy Ring and Cato, Mulligan's slave.
- Running Scared, running free (Play) Ward Melville Cultural Organization's Educational and Cultural Center, Stony Brook, New York (February 15 – March 31, 2005) Lynda R. Day — 260
- Quilts and the Underground Railroad, Hidden in Plain View, by Raymond Dobard, Jr., pub 1999 – Setauket and routes thru LI to Canada

== See also ==
- "A Long Time Coming," A Collaborative Public History & Archaeology Initiative of Higher Ground Intercultural and Heritage Association Robert E. Lewis, Christopher N. Matthews, and Judith A. Burgess, ALTC Co-Directors
- Three Village Historical Society (2005). The Setaukets, Old Field, and Poquott. Charleston, SC: Arcadia Publishing. ISBN 978-0-7385-3866-2. OCLC 62781683.
- MAP of adjacent Old Setauket Historic District Definitions
- An illustrated history of Old Setauket thru the Murals of Vince Locke, Bev Tyler 2010, Three Village Historical Society

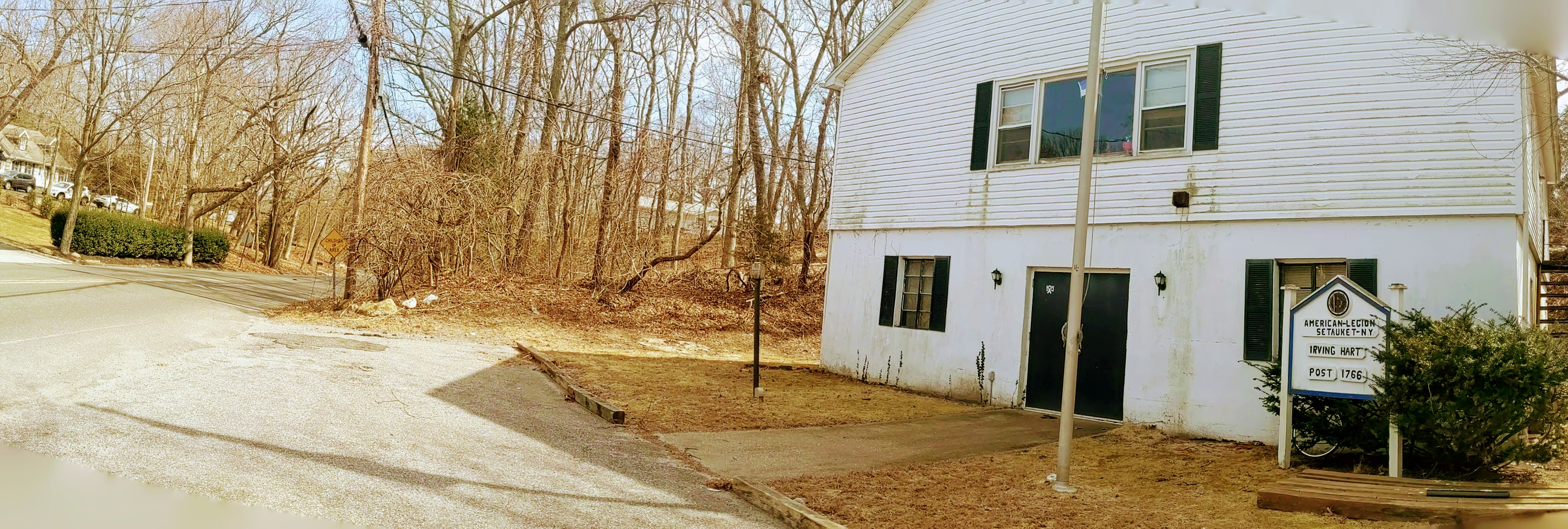
American legion Post Christian Ave

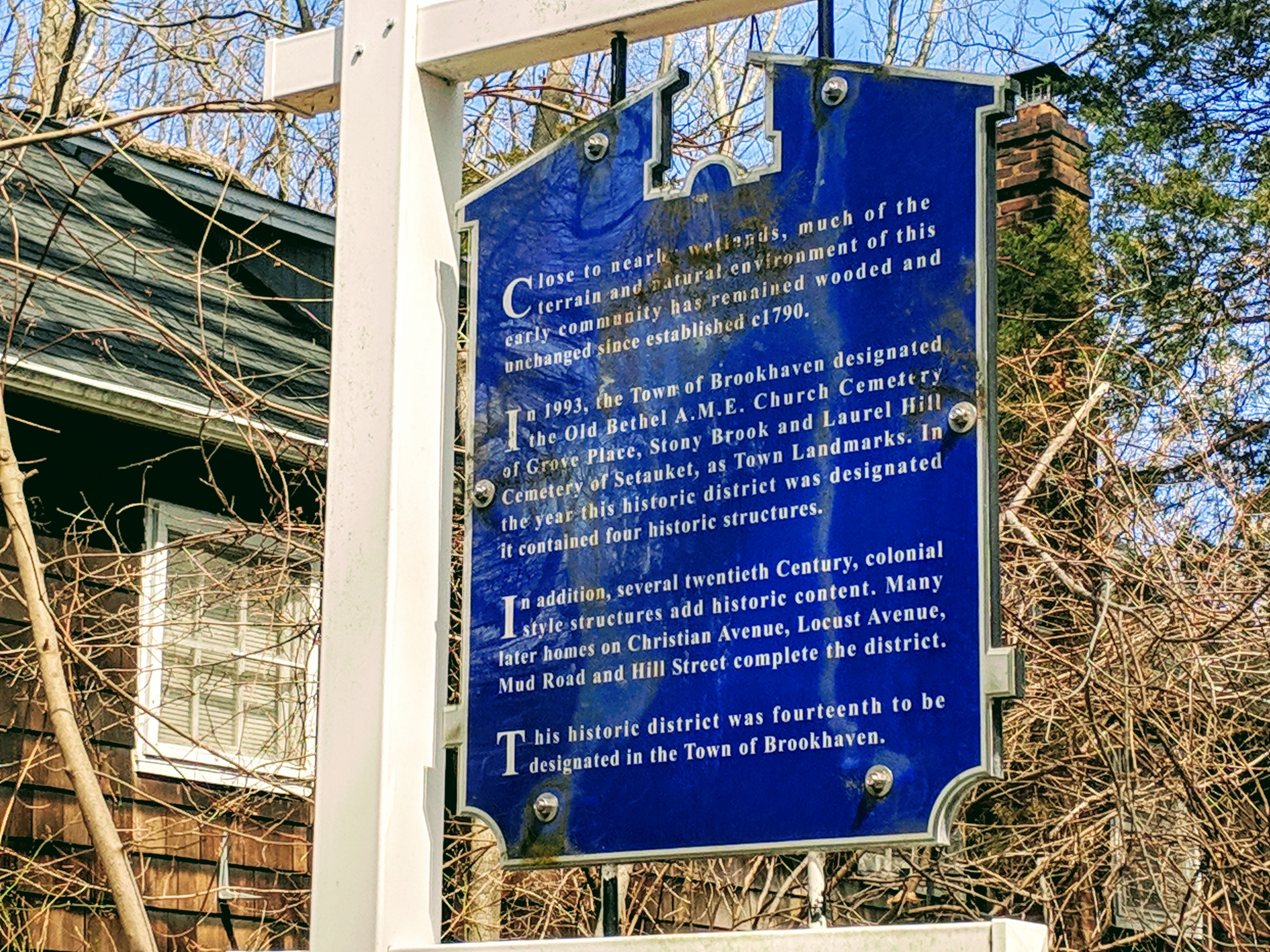
Bethel AME Cemetery BCALH sign rear

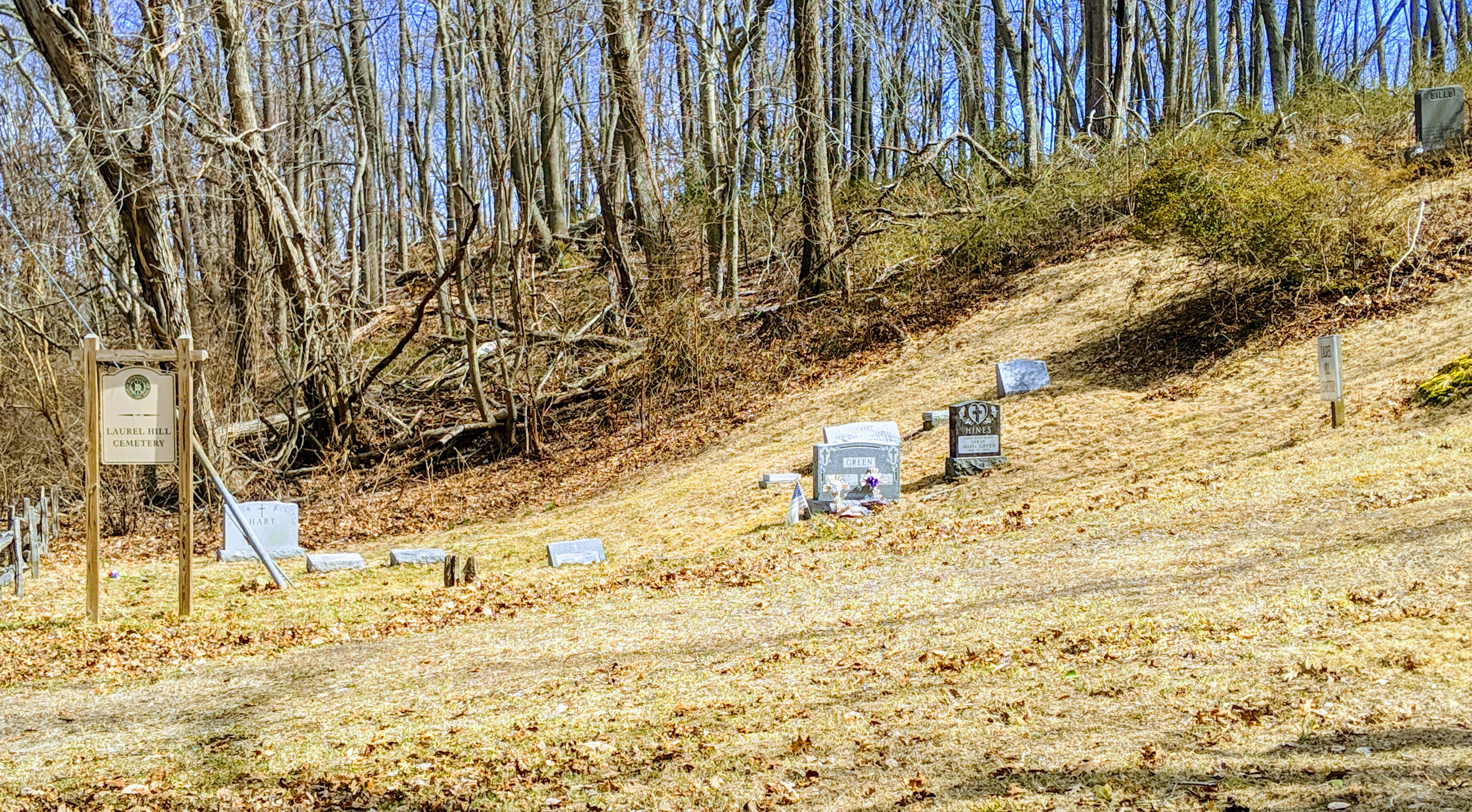
Laurel Hill

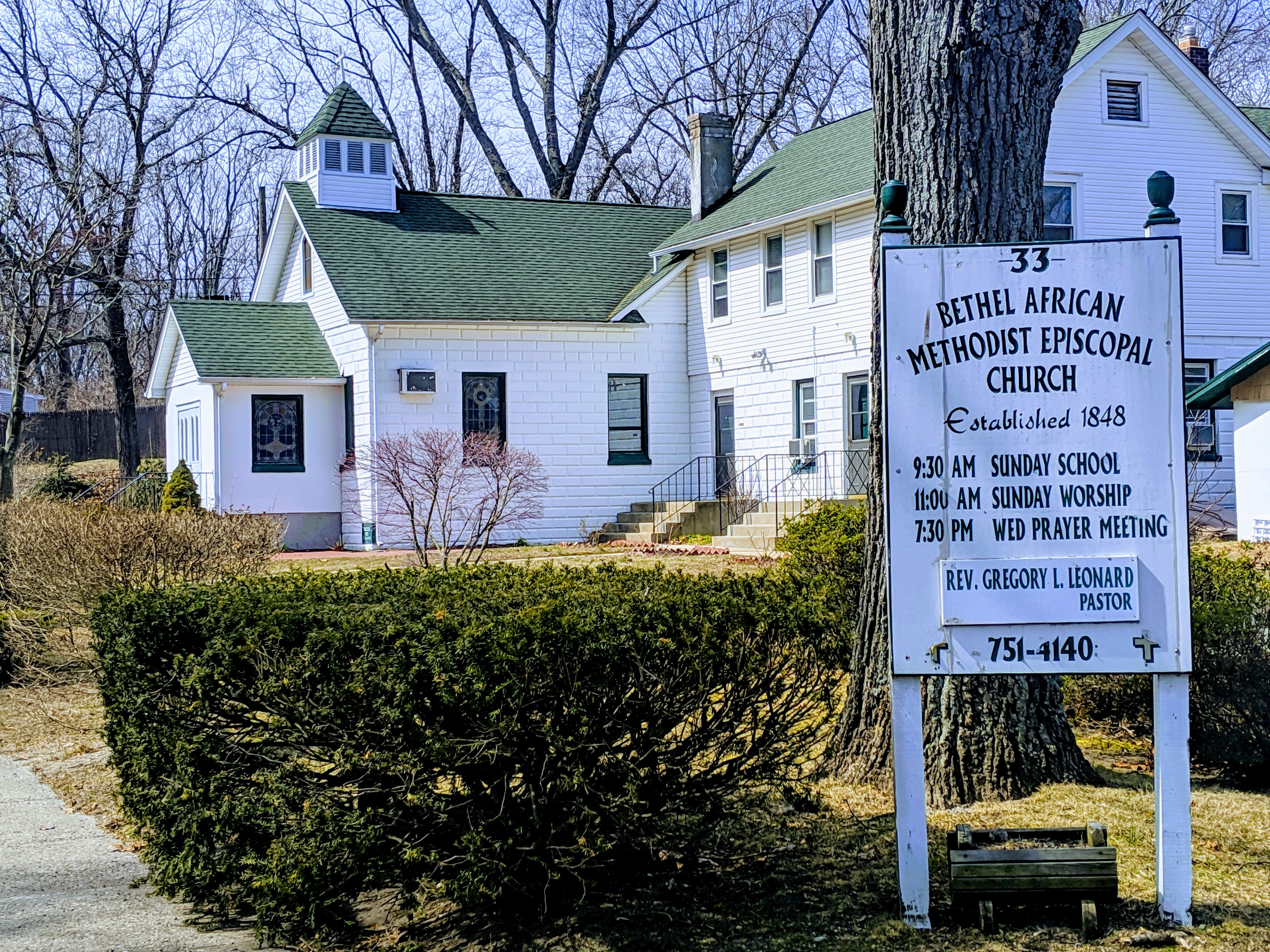
Church Sign front

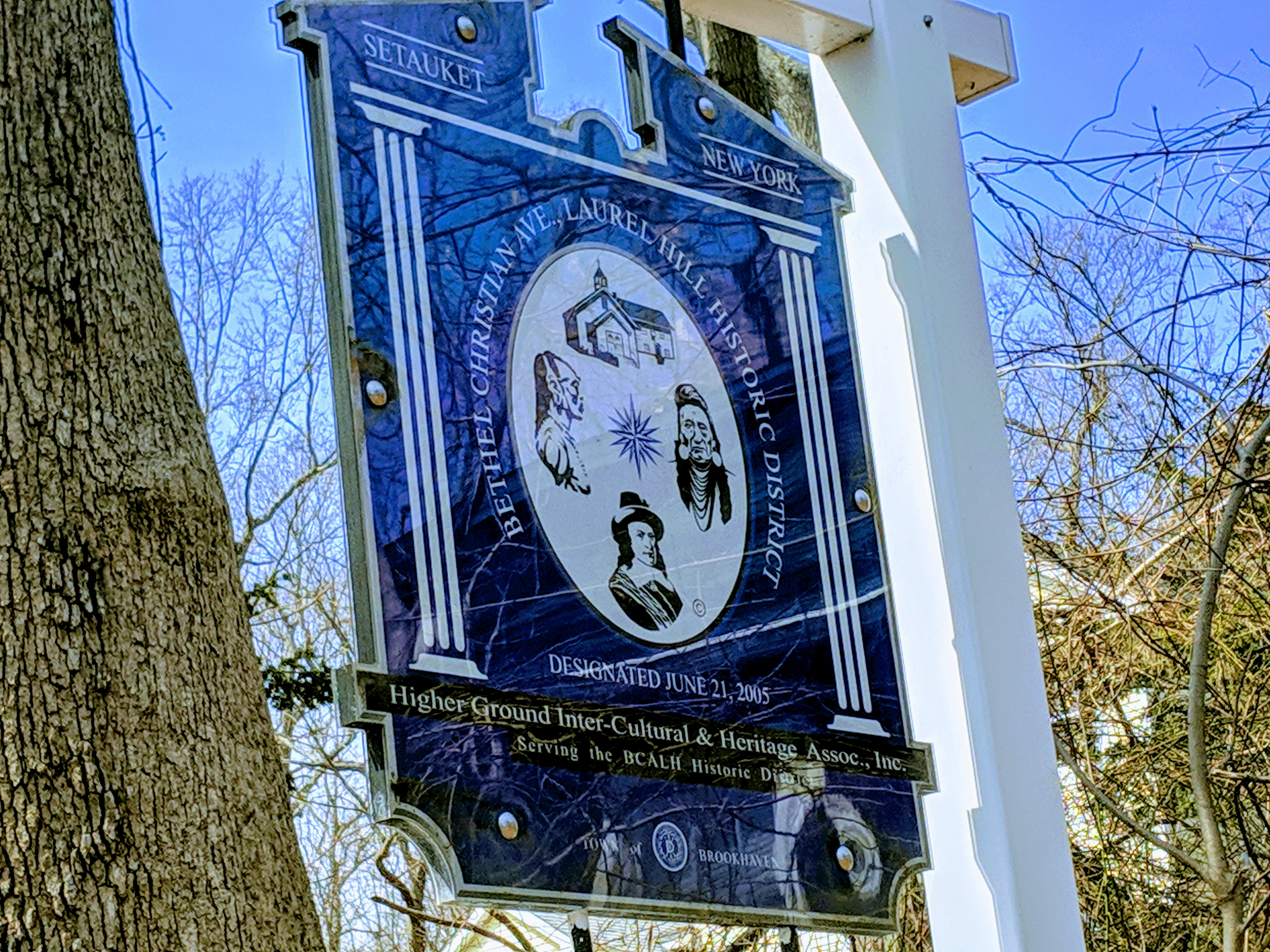
BCALH Sign Front
