= Homan-Gerard House and Mills =

== Description ==
The main residence of the Homan-Gerard complex is a two-and-a-half-story timber-frame structure in Long Island in the US state of New York designed primarily in the Federal style. First documented in the historic town records of Brookhaven in 1762, the residence underwent a major remodeling in 1790 by Daniel Homan Jr., giving it its definitive Federal appearance. The building features a three-bay facade, a gambrel roof, a prominent central chimney, and an attached rear kitchen wing. Notable exterior architectural elements include the original quadrant windows in the attic gable and a round arch placed over the central window; these windows intentionally do not contain glass and were historically backed by dark-painted boards to simulate glazed window panes.

The six-acre property incorporates four contributing support buildings, including three small utility sheds and a large two-story barn constructed during the late 19th century. Following decades of abandonment and severe environmental overgrowth, the primary structure suffered critical structural instability. In 2012 Suffolk County initiated a stabilization effort that included structural interventions in the cellar, a foundation repair, and a new roof. A comprehensive, $700,000 interior and exterior restoration was subsequently executed by the Yaphank Historical Society and Suffolk County Parks, culminating in the project's completion in 2019.

== History ==
The property serves as an index of early industrial development in Yaphank, a hamlet originally named "Millville" due to the high density of water mills established along the Carmans River. During the mid-to-late 18th century, the Homan family established mill operations at the site, harnessing the river's flow to power both a saw mill and a grist mill. These facilities were vital to the local agrarian economy, processing raw timber and grain for residents throughout central Long Island.

Ownership of the site transitioned across multiple families over two centuries, passing from the Homans to the Hawkins, Gerard, and Hard families. By the mid-20th century, commercial milling operations had ceased, and the property functioned primarily as a residential estate known locally as the Hard House. In 1963, Kenneth Hard sold the property to Suffolk County, which integrated the land and its structures into the northernmost boundary of Southaven County Park. Following its restoration, the Robert David Lion Gardiner Foundation awarded a capacity grant to implement interactive software, transforming the house into an actively interpreted historic site.

== Archaeology ==
The complex contains six contributing archaeological zones that preserve material evidence of early American industrial commerce and manufacturing. Subsurface testing and formal archaeological surveys have mapped the structural footprints and subsurface artifact assemblages of the original Homan-Gerard saw mill and grist mill. Situated along the banks of the river, these subterranean resource zones preserve remnants of early timber framing, mill races, and water-management networks.

Surveys also located the architectural remains of the J. P. Mills Store, a 19th-century commercial enterprise that served mill workers and hamlet residents. Excavations across these six zones have recovered material culture spanning from the late 18th century through the mid-20th century. These assemblages provide data regarding localized trade networks, consumer behavior, and the daily lives of mill operators and laborers in Suffolk County.
