= Gamecock Cottage =

Historic house in New York, United States

- U.S. National Register of Historic Places
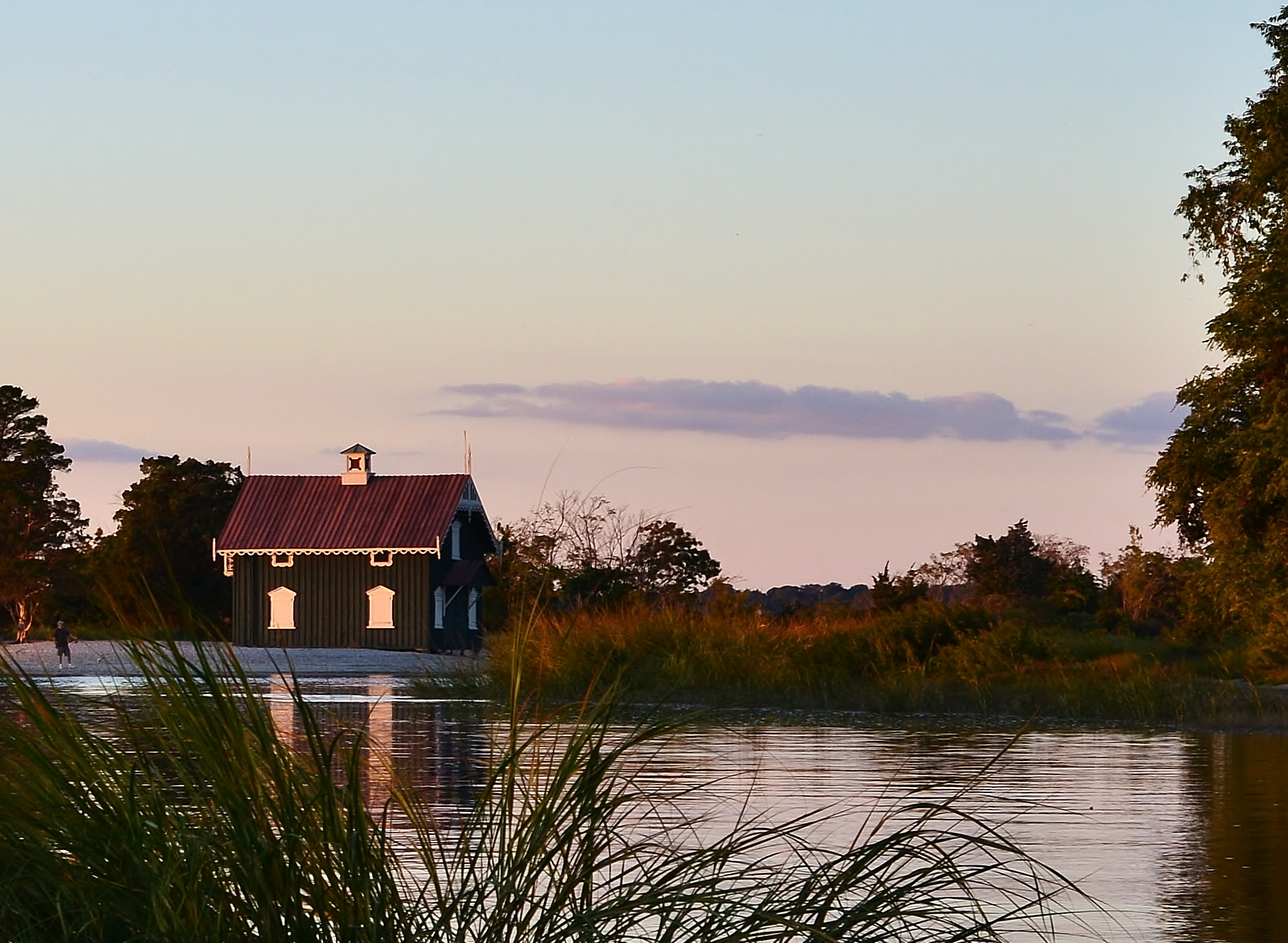

- Location within New York Location within the United States
- Location: Shipman's Point/S end of W. Meadow Beach, Stony Brook, New York
- Coordinates: 40°55′40″N 73°8′50″W
- Area: less than one acre
- Architectural style: Gothic Revival
- NRHP reference No.: 07000886
- Added to NRHP: August 30, 2007

Gamecock Cottage is an historic building located at Stony Brook in Brookhaven Town, in Suffolk County, New York on Long Island. It was built in 1876 for storage of oars and sliding-seat rowboats and is the only remaining wooden beach cottage that was part of West Meadow Beach. It is located at the southernmost point of a peninsula within what is now part of the West Meadow Wetlands Reserve, as the official public beach is now restricted to the north. The Gamecock Cottage sits at the southern endpoint of West Meadow Lane, which was once called Trustees Road.

It is a 1 1/2-story building with a front-gabled roof with a four-sided wooden cupola located in the center of the ridge line in the Gothic Revival style. It is 20 feet, 5 inches wide and 25 feet, 5 inches long and covered with board and batten siding.

It was added to the National Register of Historic Places in 2007.
