= 1809 Connecticut Secretary of the State election =

- April 10, 1809

Nominee	Samuel Wyllys	Henry Seymour
Party	Federalist	Democratic-Republican
Popular vote	8,859	2,873
Percentage	73.80%	23.90%
Secretary of the State before election
Samuel Wyllys
Federalist
Elected Secretary of the State
Samuel Wyllys
Federalist

The 1809 Connecticut Secretary of the State election was held on April 10, 1809, in order to elect the Secretary of the State of Connecticut. Incumbent Federalist Secretary of the State Samuel Wyllys won re-election against Democratic-Republican candidate Henry Seymour in a re-match of the previous year's election.

== General election ==
On election day, April 10, 1809, incumbent Federalist Secretary of the State Samuel Wyllys won re-election by a margin of 5,986 votes against his foremost opponent Democratic-Republican candidate Henry Seymour, thereby retaining Federalist control over the office of Secretary of the State. Wyllys was sworn in for his fourteenth term on May 11, 1809.

=== Results ===
Connecticut Secretary of the State election, 1809
Party	Candidate	Votes	%
Federalist	Samuel Wyllys (incumbent)	8,859	73.80
Democratic-Republican	Henry Seymour	2,873	23.90
	Scattering	279	2.30
Total votes		12,011	100.00
Federalist hold			
