= 1810 Connecticut Secretary of the State election =

- April 9, 1810

Nominee	Thomas Day	Henry Seymour
Party	Federalist	Democratic-Republican
Popular vote	6,383	2,710
Percentage	63.70%	27.10%
Secretary of the State before election
Samuel Wyllys
Federalist
Elected Secretary of the State
Thomas Day
Federalist

The 1810 Connecticut Secretary of the State election was held on April 9, 1810, in order to elect the Secretary of the State of Connecticut. Federalist candidate Thomas Day won the election against Democratic-Republican candidate Henry Seymour and fellow Federalist candidate Thomas Chester.

== General election ==
On election day, April 9, 1810, Federalist candidate Thomas Day won the election by a margin of 3,673 votes against his foremost opponent Democratic-Republican candidate Henry Seymour, thereby retaining Federalist control over the office of Secretary of the State. Day was sworn in for his first term on May 10, 1810.

=== Results ===
Connecticut Secretary of the State election, 1810
Party	Candidate	Votes	%
Federalist	Thomas Day	6,383	63.70
Democratic-Republican	Henry Seymour	2,710	27.10
Federalist	Thomas Chester	471	4.70
	Scattering	450	4.50
Total votes		10,014	100.00
Federalist hold			
