= Richard Hewlett =

Richard Hewlett may refer to:

- Richard G. Hewlett (1923–2015), American historian
- Richard Hewlett (American Revolutionary War) (1729–1789), Royalist soldier
