= Battle of Setauket =

Part of the American Revolutionary War

Coordinates: 40°56′45″N 73°6′41″W

- Part of the American Revolutionary War
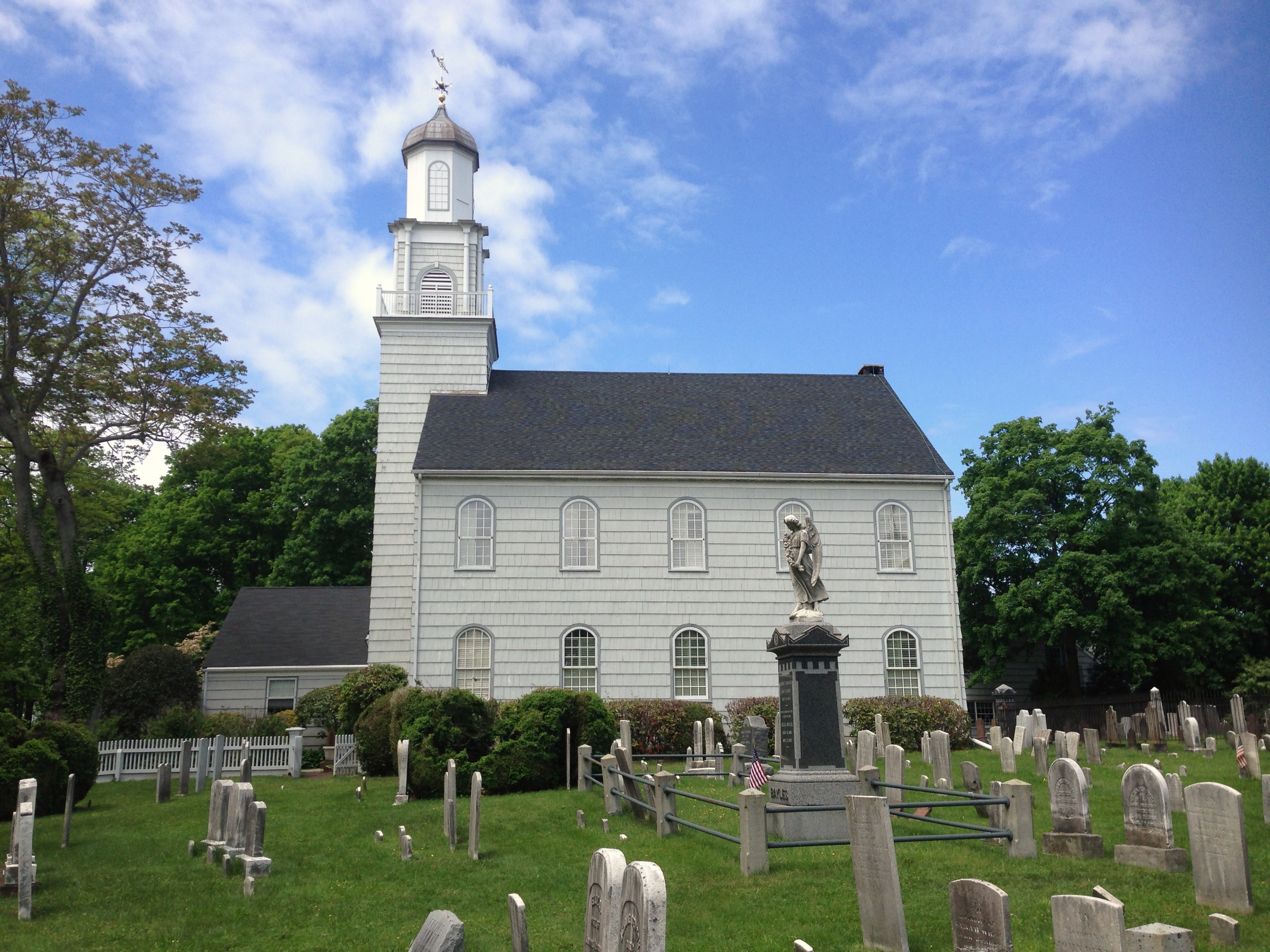
- The current Setauket Presbyterian Church (built 1812), sits on the site of the Loyalist fortifications
Date	August 22, 1777; a Friday
Location	Setauket, New York
Result	British victory

Belligerents
United States	Great Britain

Commanders and leaders
Samuel Holden Parsons	Richard Hewlett

Strength
500 Continental Army infantry	260 Loyalist militia

Casualties and losses
1 wounded	None

Map of New York, annotated to show expedition locations

The Battle of Setauket (August 22, 1777) was a failed attack during the American Revolutionary War on a fortified Loyalist outpost in Setauket, Long Island, New York, by a force of Continental Army troops from Connecticut under the command of Brigadier General Samuel Holden Parsons.

In an attempt to repeat the success of the earlier Meigs Raid against Sag Harbor, Parsons' force crossed Long Island Sound to attack the Loyalist position. Alerted by spies to the planned assault, Lieutenant Colonel Richard Hewlett strongly fortified the local Presbyterian church, surrounding it with a stockade and earthworks. After Hewlett rejected Parsons' demand to surrender, a brief firefight ensued that did no significant damage. Parsons withdrew and returned to Connecticut.

== Background ==
In 1776 the British had qualified success in the American Revolutionary War. After being forced to abandon Boston, they captured New York City, but were unable to hold New Jersey when General George Washington surprised them at Trenton and Princeton. The British consolidated their hold on New York City and Long Island during the winter months of early 1777, while the Continental Army established a land blockade around the city in New Jersey, southern New York, and southwestern Connecticut.

Detail from a 1794 map showing the Setauket area

In the spring of 1777 Lieutenant General William Howe launched raiding expeditions against Continental Army and local militia storage depots near the city. A successful raid against Peekskill, New York in March prompted him to organize a more ambitious expedition to raid a depot in Danbury, Connecticut. This expedition, led by William Tryon, the former royal governor of New York, successfully reached Danbury from a landing point in Westport, Connecticut, on April 26, and destroyed provisions and supplies. The Connecticut militia had mobilized, and over the next two days skirmished with the British as they marched back to their ships, most notably on April 27 at Ridgefield. General Samuel Holden Parsons, leading Connecticut's defenses, decided to organize an act of reprisal.

The raid executed with great success by Colonel Return Jonathan Meigs against Sag Harbor on eastern Long Island prompted Parsons to consider further such actions against other Loyalist positions on the island. On August 16, Parsons, whose brigade was stationed at Peekskill, New York, received orders from Major General Israel Putnam authorizing an expedition against Loyalist targets on Long Island. Parsons immediately ordered Colonel Samuel Blachley Webb to muster his regiment, numbering about 500 men, and march to Fairfield, Connecticut. Parsons followed, reaching Fairfield on August 21.

Loyalists recruited from Queens County, New York by Lieutenant Colonel Richard Hewlett for the 3rd battalion DeLancey's Brigade had established a fortified position in early August on the central north shore of Long Island at Setauket, just across Long Island Sound from Fairfield. Hewlett's force took over the town's Presbyterian meeting house, which they fortified. When spies informed Hewlett that Parsons was mustering troops at Fairfield, he set his force to improving the defenses, building a breastwork six feet (about 2 meters) high at a distance of 30 feet (9.1 m) all around the meeting house. Upon these works he mounted four small swivel guns.

== Battle ==
On the night of August 21, Parsons and Webb set out across Long Island Sound in whaleboats, taking with them a few small brass cannons. Early the next morning they landed at Crane's Neck (in present-day Old Field, just west of Setauket), and marched to Setauket. Finding the Loyalists strongly entrenched, Parsons first sent a truce flag to demand their surrender. Hewlett refused the demand, and the two forces began a three-hour exchange of gunfire. Neither side incurred significant casualties (Colonel Webb reported one man wounded), and the small American cannons failed to make an impression on the fortifications. Concerned that armed British ships in the Sound would hear the battle and come to investigate, Parsons called off the assault and retreated, taking with him a dozen captured horses and some blankets.

== Aftermath ==
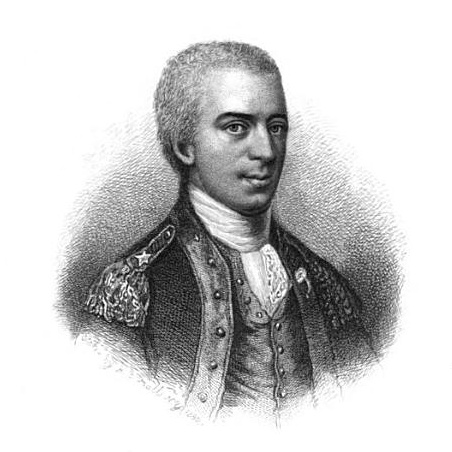
Colonel Samuel Blachley Webb

The attackers successfully recrossed the Sound, and Parsons assigned Webb's regiment to patrol the Connecticut shore. In December 1777 Parsons, Webb, and Meigs were involved in a more elaborate attempt at taking British military stores at Setauket. This one failed, because rough seas prevented Meigs from crossing, and Webb's boat was captured by a British ship.

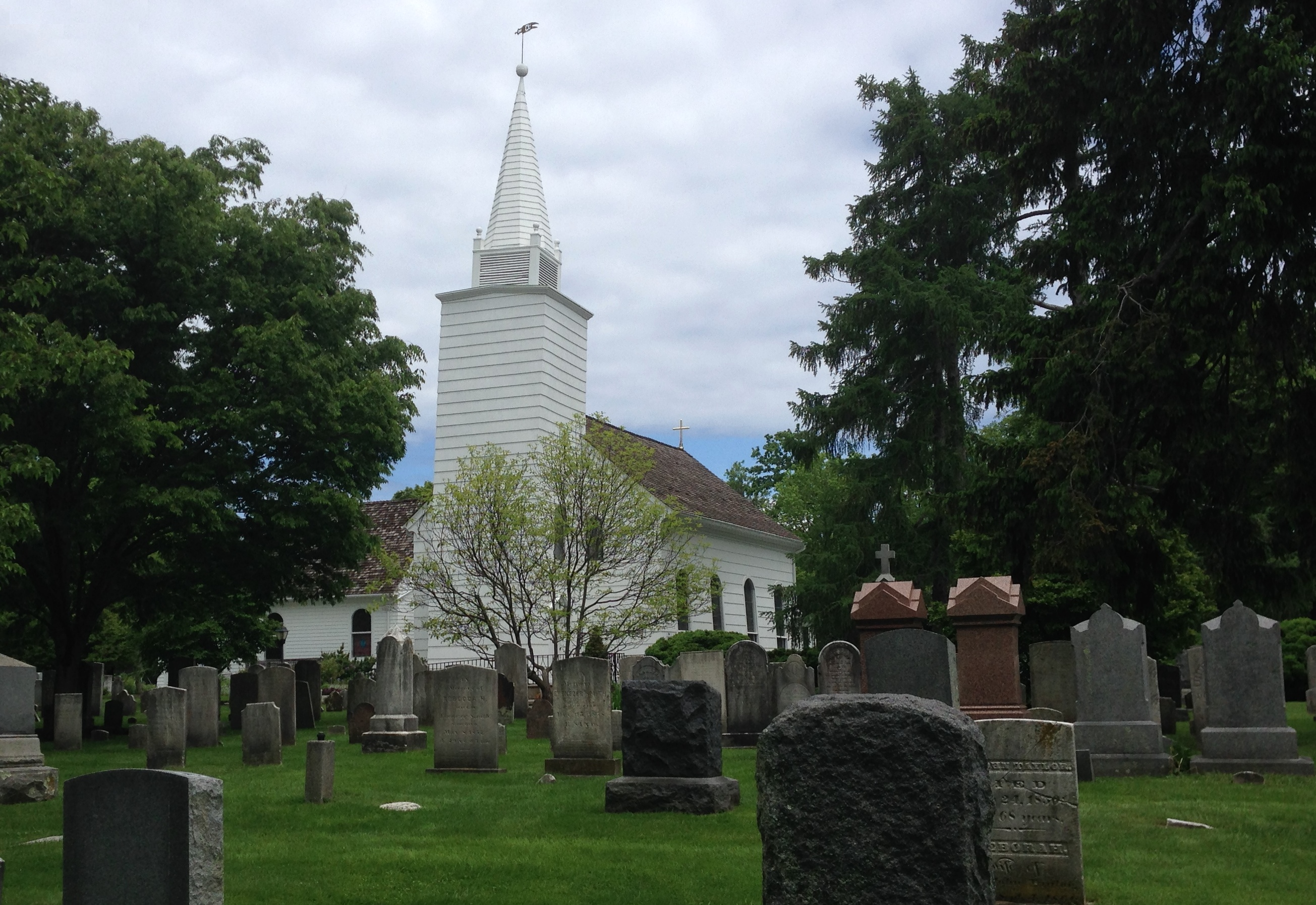
The Caroline Church (Episcopal), built in 1729, still contains bullet holes from the 1777 skirmish

Lieutenant Colonel Hewlett was favorably mentioned in general orders for his defense of the post, although it was abandoned several months later. Although Setauket was never again the target of a major expedition, it was frequently the target of small-scale raids. It was also a significant waypoint for intelligence that made its way from American spies in New York to Washington's spy chief, Benjamin Tallmadge. A Setauket native, Tallmadge operated what has since been called the Culper Ring, in which a number of Setauket residents figured prominently.

A Patriot refugee from Long Island, Zachariah Greene, was a member of Parsons' expedition, and later served as minister to the Setauket Presbyterian congregation. A new building was erected on the site in 1812.

== Portrayal ==
A fictionalized portrayal of the battle appears in the season 1 finale of the series Turn: Washington's Spies. In this portrayal, Major Benjamin Tallmadge led the Continental forces against the British garrison led by a Major Edmund Hewlett.
