= 1808 Connecticut Secretary of the State election =

- April 11, 1808

| Nominee | Samuel Wyllys | Henry Seymour |
| Party | Federalist | Democratic-Republican |
| Popular vote | 8,664 | 4,042 |
| Percentage | 67.60% | 31.50% |
Secretary of the State before election
Samuel Wyllys
Federalist
Elected Secretary of the State
Samuel Wyllys
Federalist

The 1808 Connecticut Secretary of the State election was held on April 11, 1808, in order to elect the Secretary of the State of Connecticut. Incumbent Federalist Secretary of the State Samuel Wyllys won re-election against Democratic-Republican candidate Henry Seymour in a re-match of the previous year's election.

== General election ==
On election day, April 11, 1808, incumbent Federalist Secretary of the State Samuel Wyllys won re-election by a margin of 4,622 votes against his foremost opponent Democratic-Republican candidate Henry Seymour, thereby retaining Federalist control over the office of Secretary of the State. Wyllys was sworn in for his thirteenth term on May 12, 1808.

=== Results ===
Connecticut Secretary of the State election, 1808
| Party | Candidate | Votes | % |
|---|---|---|---|
| Federalist | Samuel Wyllys (incumbent) | 8,664 | 67.60 |
| Democratic-Republican | Henry Seymour | 4,042 | 31.50 |
| | Scattering | 119 | 0.90 |
| Total votes | | 12,825 | 100.00 |
| Federalist hold | | | |
