= 1801 Connecticut Secretary of the State election =

- April 13, 1801
Nominee	Samuel Wyllys
Party	Federalist
Popular vote	7,391
Percentage	82.90%
Secretary of the State before election
Samuel Wyllys
Federalist
Elected Secretary of the State
Samuel Wyllys
Federalist

The 1801 Connecticut Secretary of the State election was held on April 13, 1801, in order to elect the Secretary of the State of Connecticut. Incumbent Federalist Secretary of the State Samuel Wyllys was re-elected unopposed.

== General election ==
On election day, April 13, 1801, incumbent Federalist Secretary of the State Samuel Wyllys was re-elected unopposed, thereby retaining Federalist control over the office of Secretary of the State. Wyllys was sworn in for his sixth term on May 14, 1801.

=== Results ===
Connecticut Secretary of the State election, 1801
Party	Candidate	Votes	%
Federalist	Samuel Wyllys (incumbent)	7,391	82.90
	Scattering	1,524	17.10
Total votes		8,915	100.00
Federalist hold			
