= 1806 Connecticut Secretary of the State election =

- April 7, 1806

Nominee	Samuel Wyllys	Henry Seymour
Party	Federalist	Democratic-Republican
Popular vote	9,508	5,219
Percentage	64.50%	35.50%
Secretary of the State before election
Samuel Wyllys
Federalist
Elected Secretary of the State
Samuel Wyllys
Federalist

The 1806 Connecticut Secretary of the State election was held on April 7, 1806, in order to elect the Secretary of the State of Connecticut. Incumbent Federalist Secretary of the State Samuel Wyllys won re-election against Democratic-Republican candidate Henry Seymour in a re-match of the previous year's election.

== General election ==
On election day, April 7, 1806, incumbent Federalist Secretary of the State Samuel Wyllys won re-election by a margin of 4,289 votes against his foremost opponent Democratic-Republican candidate Henry Seymour, thereby retaining Federalist control over the office of Secretary of the State. Wyllys was sworn in for his eleventh term on May 8, 1806.

=== Results ===
Connecticut Secretary of the State election, 1806
Party	Candidate	Votes	%
Federalist	Samuel Wyllys (incumbent)	9,508	64.50
Democratic-Republican	Henry Seymour	5,219	35.50
	Scattering	5	0.00
Total votes		14,732	100.00
Federalist hold			
