= 9th Connecticut Regiment =

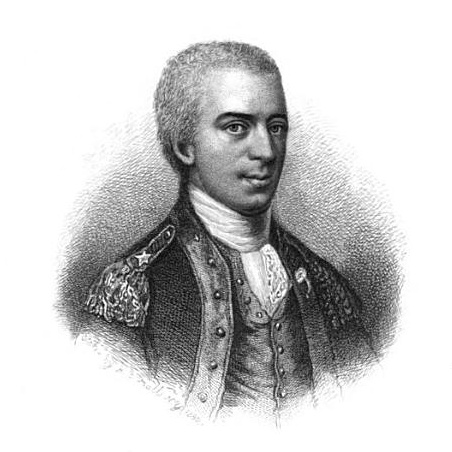
- Colonel Samuel Blachley Webb
- Active: 1777-1781
- Country: United States of America
- Allegiance: Continental Congress
- Type: Infantry
- Part of: Connecticut Line
- Colors: Red coats with yellow facings
- Engagements: Rhode Island; Setauket, NY; Springfield, NJ

Commanders
- Notable commanders: Colonel Samuel Blachley Webb

The 9th Connecticut Regiment was a regiment of the Continental Army during the American Revolutionary War. It was first called Webb's Additional Continental Regiment (after its colonel, Samuel Blachley Webb) before being added to the Connecticut Line in 1780. It saw action at Setauket in 1777, Rhode Island in 1778, and Springfield, New Jersey, in 1780, and was generally active in the defense of Connecticut, southern New York, and northern New Jersey. It was merged into the reorganized 2nd Connecticut Regiment in January 1781.

== Formation ==
The regiment was raised on January 11, 1777, at Danbury, Connecticut, by Colonel Samuel Blachley Webb, a stepson of Connecticut politician Silas Deane. It was one of several so-called "additional regiments" authorized by the Second Continental Congress that were not associated with any particular state quotas.

== History ==
The regiment first saw action at the Battle of Setauket in August 1777 under Brigadier General Samuel Holden Parsons. It was then sent to the Hudson River Valley, where it served under General George Clinton in the aftermath of the October Battle of Forts Clinton and Montgomery. In December 1777 the regiment was involved in a failed expedition to Long Island (a more elaborate attempt on Setauket than that of the previous August) in which Colonel Webb was captured. The regiment spent the winter of 1777–78 at West Point, where it assisted in the construction of fortifications (including the Webb redoubt, probably named for the colonel).

In 1778 the regiment was attached to the brigade of General James Varnum. As part of a combined Franco-American attempt to retake British-occupied Newport, Rhode Island, the brigade marched to Rhode Island, where it was involved in the August 29 Battle of Rhode Island. The battle was tactically indecisive, but the regiment was noted for its performance. The regiment wintered in Rhode Island.

The regiment spent most of 1779 in Rhode Island, but was sent to winter quarters at Morristown, New Jersey. In the spring of 1780, the remnants of Sherburne's Additional Continental Regiment were merged into the unit, and it was formally added to the Connecticut Line as the 9th Connecticut Regiment. That June, the regiment was involved in the Battle of Springfield, in which a British attempt to penetrated from New York City to the Continental Army camp at Morristown was repulsed. Its winter quarters for 1780-81 were in the Hudson valley.

== Disbandment ==
The regiment was merged into the 2nd Connecticut Regiment on January 1, 1781, at West Point, New York, which was disbanded at the end of the war on November 15, 1783. Colonel Webb, who was exchanged in 1781, was then given command of the reorganized 3rd Connecticut Regiment.

== Field officers ==
- Colonel Samuel B. Webb - 1 January 1777 to 1 January 1781
- Lieutenant Colonel William S. Livingston (soldier) - 1 January 1777 to 10 October 1778
- Lieutenant Colonel Ebenezer Huntington - 10 October 1778 to 1 January 1781
- Major Ebenezer Huntington - 1 January 1777 to 10 October 1778
- Major John P. Wyllys - 10 October 1778 to 1 January 1781
