= 1807 Connecticut Secretary of the State election =

- April 13, 1807

Nominee	Samuel Wyllys	Henry Seymour
Party	Federalist	Democratic-Republican
Popular vote	7,956	3,607
Percentage	68.80%	31.20%
Secretary of the State before election
Samuel Wyllys
Federalist
Elected Secretary of the State
Samuel Wyllys
Federalist

The 1807 Connecticut Secretary of the State election was held on April 13, 1807, in order to elect the Secretary of the State of Connecticut. Incumbent Federalist Secretary of the State Samuel Wyllys won re-election against Democratic-Republican candidate Henry Seymour in a re-match of the previous year's election.

== General election ==
On election day, April 13, 1807, incumbent Federalist Secretary of the State Samuel Wyllys won re-election by a margin of 4,349 votes against his foremost opponent Democratic-Republican candidate Henry Seymour, thereby retaining Federalist control over the office of Secretary of the State. Wyllys was sworn in for his twelfth term on May 14, 1807.

=== Results ===
Connecticut Secretary of the State election, 1807
Party	Candidate	Votes	%
Federalist	Samuel Wyllys (incumbent)	7,956	68.80
Democratic-Republican	Henry Seymour	3,607	31.20
Total votes		11,563	100.00
Federalist hold			
