= Arthur S. Tuttle =

American civil engineer (1865–1949)

Arthur Smith Tuttle
- Born: March 26, 1865; Burlington, Connecticut, U.S.
- Died: May 19, 1949 (aged 84); Brooklyn, New York, U.S.
- Resting place: Setauket Presbyterian Burial Ground
- Education: New York University (BS, CE)
- Spouse: Helen Aldridge Smith (m. 1892)
- Children: 3

Arthur Smith Tuttle (March 26, 1865 – May 19, 1949) was an American civil engineer primarily known for his public service on projects in New York City. He was associated with the New York City Board of Estimate for a period of 31 years, rising to the level of chief engineer. Tuttle also became involved with federal agencies later in his career, directing projects in New York State for the Public Works Administration and serving as a consultant to the Works Progress Administration.

== Early life and education ==
Arthur Smith Tuttle was born on March 26, 1865 in Burlington, Connecticut to Theron Tuttle and Jennie E. Tuttle (née Beach). His father was a medical practitioner. Tuttle moved to New York at the age of five. He attended New York University (NYU), where he received bachelor of science and civil engineer degrees in June 1885 from NYU's Department of Arts and Science.

== Career ==
Tuttle had worked on the construction of the Weehawken Reservoir in New Jersey during his summer vacations while he was an undergraduate student at NYU. After graduation, he worked as a rodman and assistant engineer for the Brooklyn Water Works from 1895 to 1901, where he was primarily involved with the development of new sources of groundwater and surface water for the water supply system. Tuttle traveled to Hawaii in 1901, where he spent a year working on an investigation for the trusts of the Bishop Estate and Bishop Museum to develop the water resources of the Waipio Valley.

In 1902, Tuttle returned to New York City and began working for the Board of Estimate, becoming the agency's chief engineer in 1921. He resigned from his position in 1928, but was retained by the Board of Estimate as a consulting engineer until 1933. During his association with the agency, Tuttle was involved with projects including Cross Bay Boulevard across Jamaica Bay, grade crossing eliminations along the Long Island Rail Road's Atlantic Branch in Brooklyn and New York Central's West Side Line in Manhattan, the Manhattan approach to the George Washington Bridge, the Wards Island Water Pollution Control Plant, and the West Side Highway. He was credited as the inventor of an improvement to a valve to remove air from water mains and an improvement to a Venturi tube in 1903 and 1906, respectively. In 1926, when New Jersey claimed that garbage being dumped offshore by New York City was polluting its beaches, Tuttle dropped 7,443 bottles with return post cards at the same ocean dumping grounds (located about 20 miles [32 km] southeast of Scotland Lightship)—and only 491 of them washed up on the Jersey Shore.

In 1933, Tuttle became the New York state engineer of the Federal Emergency Administration of Public Works (PWA), and from 1936 to 1937, he served as the New York State director of the PWA. Major projects launched during this period where Tuttle served as a project engineer included the Lincoln Tunnel, Queens–Midtown Tunnel, and Triborough Bridge. From 1937 to 1941, he served as a consulting engineer to the Works Progress Administration (WPA), after which he served as the director of the New York City Federal Public Works Reserve from 1941 to 1942.

In 1942, Tuttle was awarded an honorary Doctor of Engineering degree from Rensselaer Polytechnic Institute. That same year, he entered into a partnership with structural engineer Elwyn Seelye, mechanical engineer Clyde R. Place and architect Antonin Raymond. The firm of Tuttle, Seelye, Place & Raymond had a staff of 80 employees and prepared construction plans for military and naval installations during World War II, including barracks and staging facilities at Camp Kilmer in New Jersey and Camp Shanks in New York and an airport and housing at Fort Dix in New Jersey. The partnership was dissolved in 1945 after the end of the war. Tuttle then became chairman of the board of the Haller Testing Laboratories, remaining in the role until his death; the firm was involved with testing of materials for the construction of the headquarters of the United Nations.

== Professional societies ==
Tuttle served as president of the American Society of Civil Engineers, Municipal Club of Brooklyn, and Municipal Engineers of the City of New York. He was also a member of the American Institute of Consulting Engineers, American Water Works Association, Regional Plan Association, and the United Engineering Trustees.

== Personal life and death ==
Tuttle married Helen Aldridge Smith on June 1, 1892 in Brooklyn. The couple had three children—one daughter and two sons. His family resided in Brooklyn and also had a home in Stony Brook on Long Island, where Tuttle was a member of the nearby St. George's Golf and Country Club in East Setauket. He served as president of the Pleiades Club and was a member of the Cosmos Club.

Tuttle died on May 19, 1949 at Brooklyn Hospital. His funeral was held at the St. Ann's Protestant Episcopal Church in Brooklyn. Tuttle was buried in the churchyard of the Caroline Protestant Episcopal Church in Setauket, near his other home in Stony Brook.
