= John Wyllys =

18th century United States Army officer

John Palsgrave Wyllys
- Born: 1754
- Died: 1790 (aged 35–36); Kekionga (Fort Wayne, Indiana)
- Spouse: Jerusha Talcott
- Relatives: George Wyllys (father), Mary Woodbridge (mother), Samuel Wyllys (brother)
- Military career
- Allegiance: United States
- Army: Continental Army; United States Army
- Rank: Major
- Commands: 3rd Connecticut Regiment
- Conflicts: American Revolutionary War; Northwest Indian War

John Palsgrave Wyllys (1754-1790) was a United States Army officer from Connecticut. Wyllys was the son of George Wyllys and Mary Woodbridge, and the youngest brother of Samuel Wyllys. He graduated from Yale College with Nathan Hale.

Wyllys began his American Revolutionary War service during the Siege of Boston. Wyllys was captured by the British during the retreat from New York. He was released the following year, and promoted to captain in the 9th Connecticut Regiment. He also participated in the Saratoga campaign of 1777. He was promoted to major in 1780, while serving in Webb's Additional Continental Regiment. During the Yorktown campaign, he commanded the 3rd Connecticut Regiment under General Lafayette.

Wyllys married Jerusha Talcott. They had one child, who died an infant in 1783. Jerusha died a week later.

Wyllys joined the First American Regiment in 1785. He took part in the Harmar campaign of 1790, and was in command of the combined U.S. regular and militia force in the climactic Battle of Kekionga on 22 October 1790. His plan to take the Native American town was foiled when Native American decoys drew away his militia support. After Wyllys and his 60 regulars crossed the St. Joseph River, they were ambushed in an open field. Wyllys died in battle. A non-commissioned officer of the regiment reported seeing a Native American flaunting Wyllys' large hat.

A street in Fort Wayne, Indiana is named for him.
