= William Brent =

William Brent may refer to:

- William Brent Jr. (1783–1848), Virginia politician and U.S. Ambassador to Argentina
- William Leigh Brent (1784–1848), U.S. Representative from Louisiana
- William Lee Brent (1931–2006), American civil rights activist
- William Brent, musician with The Drifters
- William Brent (actor) (born 1995), American actor also known as Billy Unger

== See also ==
- William Brent Bell (born 1980), American screenwriter and film director
- William Brenton Hall (1764–1809), American physician
