= Burn Gorman =

English actor (born 1974)

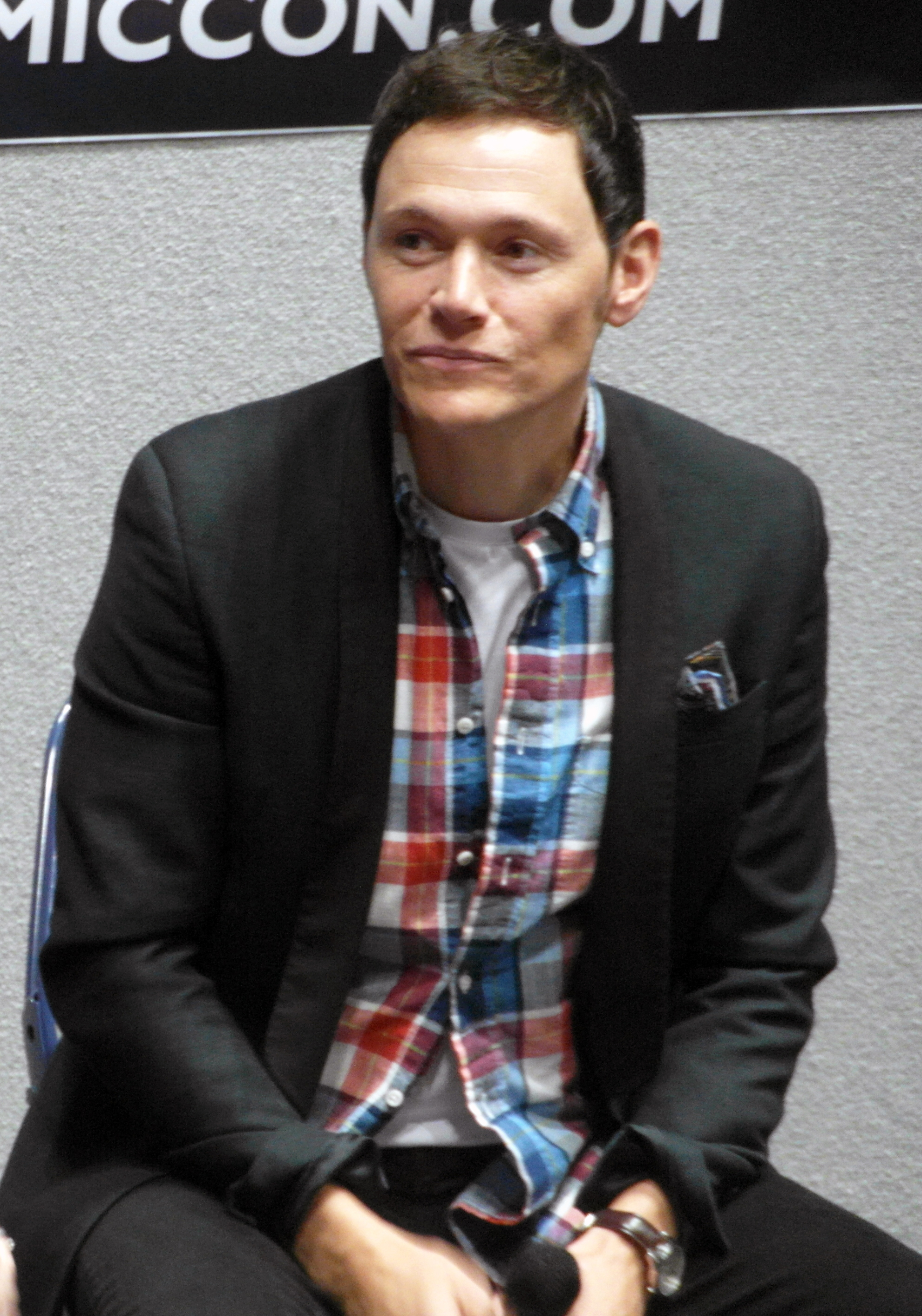
- Gorman in 2014
- Born: Burn Hugh Gorman; 1 September 1974 (age 52); Los Angeles, California, U.S.
- Citizenship: United Kingdom; United States
- Occupation: Actor
- Years active: 1998–present
- Spouse: Sarah Beard (m. 2004; div. 2017)
- Children: 3

Burn Hugh Gorman (born 1 September 1974) is an American-born English actor. He is known for his television roles as Owen Harper in the BBC series Torchwood (2006–2008), Karl Tanner in the HBO series Game of Thrones (2013–14), Major Edmund Hewlett in the AMC series Turn: Washington's Spies (2014–2017), 'The Marshal' in the Prime Video series The Man in the High Castle (2015), and Adolphus Murtry in Prime Video series The Expanse (2019). His film roles include Phillip Stryver in Christopher Nolan’s The Dark Knight Rises (2012), Hermann Gottlieb in Guillermo del Toro’s Pacific Rim (2013) and its sequel Pacific Rim: Uprising (2018), Commander Hoff in The Hunger Games: The Ballad of Songbirds and Snakes, and Father Damien in Tim Burton's Beetlejuice Beetlejuice (2024).

== Early life ==
Burn Hugh Gorman was born on 1 September 1974 in Los Angeles, California, the son of English parents. His father was a professor of linguistics at UCLA. He has three older sisters. He has reportedly claimed to be the nephew of Bartley Gorman, considered "King of the Gypsies". At the age of 7, he moved with his family back to England, where they settled in London. He later trained at the Manchester School of Theatre at Manchester Metropolitan University.

Gorman is also an accomplished beatboxer. He participated in the 2003 International Human Beatbox Convention, where he won the title of Radio 1Xtra's Human Beatbox Champion.

== Career ==
One of Gorman's earliest television roles was in 1998 as Etheric Foundation cult leader Ben Andrews in Granada TV's Coronation Street. He played William Guppy in the 2005 BBC One adaptation of Charles Dickens' Bleak House, before being cast as Owen Harper in the BBC science fiction series Torchwood. Gorman starred in the first two series of the show before his character was killed off in the series 2 finale, "Exit Wounds".

Other BBC television roles include Lark Rise to Candleford, Funland, and Bonekickers; he also appeared in Channel 4's political thriller Low Winter Sun.

Gorman played scriptwriter Ray Galton in the BBC Four television play The Curse of Steptoe. He has also appeared in television series such as Dalziel and Pascoe, Casualty, Merseybeat and The Inspector Lynley Mysteries.

Gorman played Jed on the soap opera EastEnders in March 2007. He starred as Hindley Earnshaw in the ITV adaptation of Emily Brontë's Wuthering Heights. In 2011, he starred in Sky1's second Martina Cole adaptation, The Runaway and in 2014, portrayed Adam, the lead character's stalker and fellow immortal, in ABC's Forever. He played Karl Tanner in seasons 3 and 4 of HBO's Game of Thrones, Major Hewlett in the AMC miniseries Turn and Nicholas Farlow on the BBC miniseries Jamestown.

On film, Gorman has had roles in Layer Cake, The Best Man, Penelope, Fred Claus, Cemetery Junction, and The Dark Knight Rises. He also appeared as Dr. Hermann Gottlieb in the film Pacific Rim and its sequel Pacific Rim: Uprising.

On radio, Gorman played Elizabethan spy Robert Poley in Michael Butt's The Babington Plot (2008) and Unauthorized History: The Killing (2010) and Mike Walker's The Reckoning: The Death of Christopher Marlowe (2022).

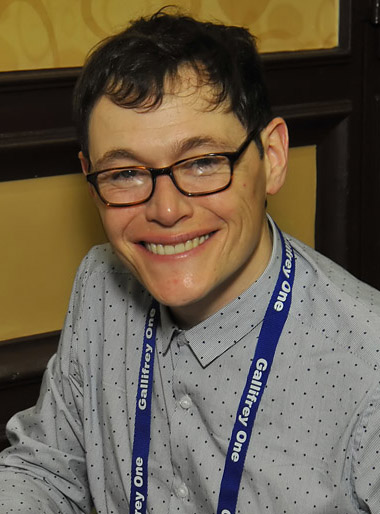
Gorman in 2015

Gorman's stage credits include Ladybird (Royal Court), Flush (Soho Theatre), and Gong Donkeys (Bush Theatre), prompting Michael Billington of The Guardian to write that "Gorman proves that he is one of the best young actors in Britain". He has performed in readings, workshops, and development initiatives with the National Theatre Studio, Young Vic, Royal Court, Oxford Stage Company, Paines Plough and Soho Theatre. Outside London, he has worked with Nottingham Playhouse, the Theatre Royal, Plymouth and the Royal Exchange and Contact Theatres, where he was nominated for a Manchester Evening News Best Newcomer Award.

From 2008 to 2009, Gorman played Bill Sikes in the West End revival of the musical Oliver! for which he was nominated for Best Supporting Actor in a Musical in the 2010 Whatsonstage Theatre Awards.

== Personal life ==
Gorman was married to schoolteacher Sarah Beard from 2004 to 2017. They have three children.

== Filmography ==
Key
†	Denotes works that have not yet been released

=== Film ===
Year	Title	Role	Notes
2004	Layer Cake	Gazza	
2005	Colour Me Kubrick	Willie	
2005	The Best Man	Bus Driver	
2006	Penelope	Larry	
2007	Fred Claus	Elf	
2008	The Oxford Murders	Yuri Podorov	
2010	Cemetery Junction	PC Renwick	
2011	Up There	Martin	
2011	Johnny English Reborn	Agent Slater	
2012	Red Lights	Benedict Cohen	
2012	The Dark Knight Rises	Phillip Stryver	
2013	Jimi: All Is by My Side	Michael Jeffery	
2013	Pacific Rim	Hermann Gottlieb	
2014	Low Down	Wiggenhern	
2014	Walking with the Enemy	Otto Skorzeny	
2014	Alexander and the Terrible, Horrible, No Good, Very Bad Day	Mr. Brand	
2015	Crimson Peak	Mr Holly	
2016	In a Valley of Violence	Priest	
2016	Imperium	Morgan	
2018	Pacific Rim Uprising	Hermann Gottlieb	
2020	Undergods	Tim	
2020	The Good Traitor	Berle	
2020	Enola Holmes	Linthorn	
2022	Watcher	Daniel Weber	
2022	Guillermo del Toro's Pinocchio	The Priest	Voice role
2023	Ghosted	Taxi driver	
2023	Ransomed	Richard Carter	South Korean film
2023	The Hunger Games: The Ballad of Songbirds & Snakes	Commander Hoff	
2024	Lift	Cormac	
2024	Beetlejuice Beetlejuice	Father Damien	
2025	Frankenstein	Executioner	
2025	All the Devils Are Here	Numbers	
2026	Digger	Amos	
2026	Jumanji: Open World †		Post-production
TBA	A Colt Is My Passport †		Post-production
TBA	Brides †		Filming

=== Television ===
Year	Title	Role	Notes
1998	Coronation Street	Ben Andrews	Recurring role, 16 episodes
2000	Casualty	Geoff Simpson	1 episode
2001	Merseybeat	Sean Finnigan	1 episode
2002	A Good Thief	DC Fairchild	Television film
2005	The Inspector Lynley Mysteries	Billy Verger	Episode: "In Divine Proportion"
2005	Funland	Tim Timothy	3 episodes
2005	Bleak House	William Guppy	Main role, 11 episodes
2006	Low Winter Sun	Det. Con. Kenny Morton	2 episodes
2006	Dalziel and Pascoe	Jerry Hart	Episode: "A Death in the Family"
2006–2008	Torchwood	Owen Harper	Main role, 26 episodes
2007	Agatha Christie's Marple	Jacko Argyle	'Ordeal by Innocence'
2007	EastEnders	Jed	1 episode
2008	Bonekickers	Banks	1 episode
2008	The Curse of Steptoe	Ray Galton	Television film
2009	Wuthering Heights	Hindley Earnshaw	Miniseries, 2 episodes
2011	The Runaway	Richard Gates	Miniseries, 5 episodes
2011	The Hour	Thomas Kish	4 episodes
2011	Lark Rise to Candleford	Reverend Marley	1 episode
2013	Spies of Warsaw	Jourdain	Miniseries, 4 episodes
2013	Revenge	Mr Trask	4 episodes
2013	It's Always Sunny in Philadelphia	Scientist	1 episode
2013–2014	Game of Thrones	Karl Tanner	4 episodes
2014–2015	Forever	Adam / Lewis Farber	Recurring role, 8 episodes
2014–2017	Turn: Washington's Spies	Major Edmund Hewlett	Main role, 28 episodes
2015	And Then There Were None	Detective Sergeant William Blore	Miniseries, 3 episodes
2015	The Man in the High Castle	The Marshal	2 episodes
2016	Stan Lee's Lucky Man	Doug	3 episodes
2017–2019	Jamestown	Nicholas Farlow	Main role, 15 episodes
2019	The Expanse	Adolphus Murtry	Recurring role, 10 episodes
2019	Cheat	Ben Jarvis	4 episodes
2022	Halo	Vinsher Grath	Recurring role, 5 episodes
2022	The Offer	Charles Bluhdorn	Miniseries, 10 episodes

=== Video games ===
Year	Title	Role	Notes
2009	Risen	Fincher, Brent, Dwight, Flavio, Tucker	Voice; English dub
2011	Star Wars: The Old Republic	Darth Angral, Darth Tormen, Apprentice Ortosin	Voice

== Radio ==
Year	Title	Role
1998	The Old Man and the Angel	
1999	And Counting	
1999	Glad To Be Back	
1998	The Taming of the Shrew	Grumio
2002	The Go Slow Club	Bob
2002	Fat Campl	Craig
2003	The Wire	Otis
2004	Classic Serial: The Pickwick Papers	Sam Weller
2007	King Trash	Clint
2008	Classic Serial: The Mayor of Casterbridge	Abel
2008	The Babington Plot	Robert Poley
2008	New Metamorphoses	Andre
2009	The Wonderful Wizard of Oz	Tin Man
2010	Unauthorized History: The Killing	Robert Poley
2012	The Odd Job	Clive
2012	The Spy	Harvey Birch
2013	He Died With His Eyes Open	The Detective
2022	The Reckoning: The Death of Christopher Marlowe	Robert Poley
