= Samuel H. P. Hall =

American politician (1804–1877)

Member of the New York Senate from the 23rd district
- In office 1848–1849
- Preceded by: new district
- Succeeded by: Levi Dimmick

Member of the New York Senate from the 4th district
- In office 1847–1847
- Preceded by: Thomas B. Mitchell
- Succeeded by: district abolished

Personal details
- Born: Samuel Holden Parsons Hall; June 28, 1804 Middletown, Connecticut, U.S.
- Died: March 5, 1877 (aged 72) Binghamton, New York, U.S.
- Resting place: Spring Forest Cemetery
- Party: Whig
- Spouses: Emeline Bulkeley (m. 1826, died) Elnora Robbins (m. 1857)
- Children: 5
- Parent: William Brenton Hall (father)
- Relatives: Samuel Holden Parsons (grandfather); Jonathan Parsons (great-grandfather); Nathan Kelsey Hall (cousin)
- Occupation: Politician; merchant

Samuel Holden Parsons Hall (June 28, 1804 – March 5, 1877) was an American merchant and politician from New York.

== Life ==
He was the son of Dr. William Brenton Hall (1764–1809), a physician, and Mehetable (Parsons) Hall (1772–1825), a daughter of Gen. Samuel Holden Parsons (1737–1789). Rev. Jonathan Parsons (1705–1776) was his great-grandfather.

On May 14, 1826, he married Emeline Bulkeley (1798–1855), daughter of Captain Charles and Eunice (Robbins) Bulkeley of Rocky Hill, Connecticut. They had five children: Charles Samuel (1827–1910), William Brenton (1829–1856), Josephine Emeline (1830–1857), Theodore Parsons (1835–1910), and Richard Henry (1839–1872).

Declining the opportunity to attend his father's alma mater (Yale), Hall operated business firms in Middletown and Rocky Hill in partnership with his brother, William Brenton Hall (1798–1824). In 1833, he and his family moved to Buffalo—but the climate proving insalubrious, in 1837, he moved to Binghamton, a growing town at the junction of the Chenango and Susquehanna rivers (and a way station on the Chenango Canal, a branch of the Erie).

Hall served as trustee and president of the village of Binghamton. In 1846, he was elected as a Whig member of the New York State Senate from 1847 to 1849, sitting in the 70th (6th D.), 71st and 72nd New York State Legislatures (both 23rd D.). With the election of Millard Fillmore to the U.S. presidency, Hall's cousin, Nathan Kelsey Hall was named U.S. Postmaster General. Through this connection, he became a member of the board of directors of the Erie Railroad.

Following the death of his first wife, Hall he married her cousin, Elnora Robbins (b. 1812) in 1857.

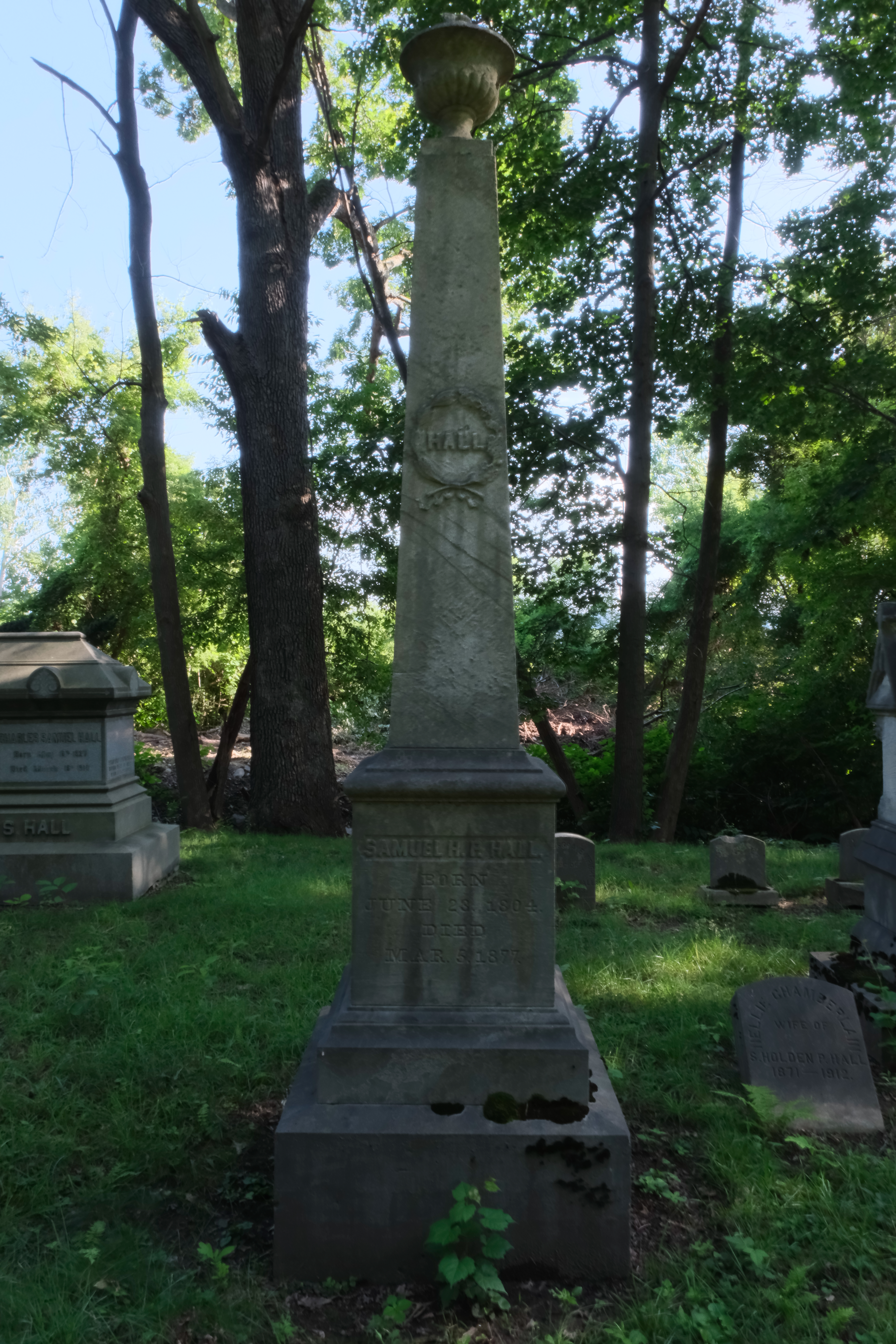
Grave of Hall in Spring Forest Cemetery

Samuel Holden Parsons Hall died in Binghamton on March 5, 1877, and was buried in Spring Forest Cemetery in that city.

Hall's eldest son, Charles Samuel, received a B.A. from Yale College in 1848 and an M.A. and L.L.B. from the Yale Law School in 1850. He became a prominent attorney in Binghamton and a nationally-known genealogist. His brother, Theodore Parsons Hall, graduated from Yale in 1856 and became a leading business man in Detroit, where he married into one of the old French-Canadian families. He too became a well-known genealogist and author of books on local history.

== Sources ==
Theodore Parsons Hall. Genealogical Notes Relating to the Families of Hon. Lyman Hall of Georgia, Hon. Samuel Holden Parsons of Binghamton, N.Y., and Hon. Nathan Kelsey Hall of Buffalo, N.Y. (Albany: Joel Munsell's Sons, 1886). Charles Samuel Hall. Hall Ancestry: A Series of Sketches of the Lineal Ancestors of the Children of Samuel Holden Parsons Hall and His Wife Emeline Bulkeley of Binghamton, N.Y. with Some Account of Nearly One Hundred of the Early Puritan Families of New England (New York: G.P. Putnam's Sons, 1896). "Charles Samuel Hall." Obituary Record of Graduates of Yale University Deceased during the Academical Year Ending June 1910 (New Haven: Yale University, 1910), 1166-1168. "Theodore Parsons Hall." Obituary Record of Graduates of Yale University Deceased during the Academical Year Ending June 1909 (New Haven: Yale University, 1909).

- The New York Civil List compiled by Franklin Benjamin Hough (pages 136 and 141; Weed, Parsons and Co., 1858)
- The American Biographical Sketch Book by William Hunt (1849; pg. 151–154)
- Hall genealogy at Family Tree Maker

New York State Senate
Preceded by Thomas B. Mitchell	New York State Senate; Fourth District (Class 4); 1847	Succeeded by district abolished
Preceded by new district	New York State Senate; 23rd District; 1848–1849	Succeeded by Levi Dimmick
