= 6th Connecticut Regiment =

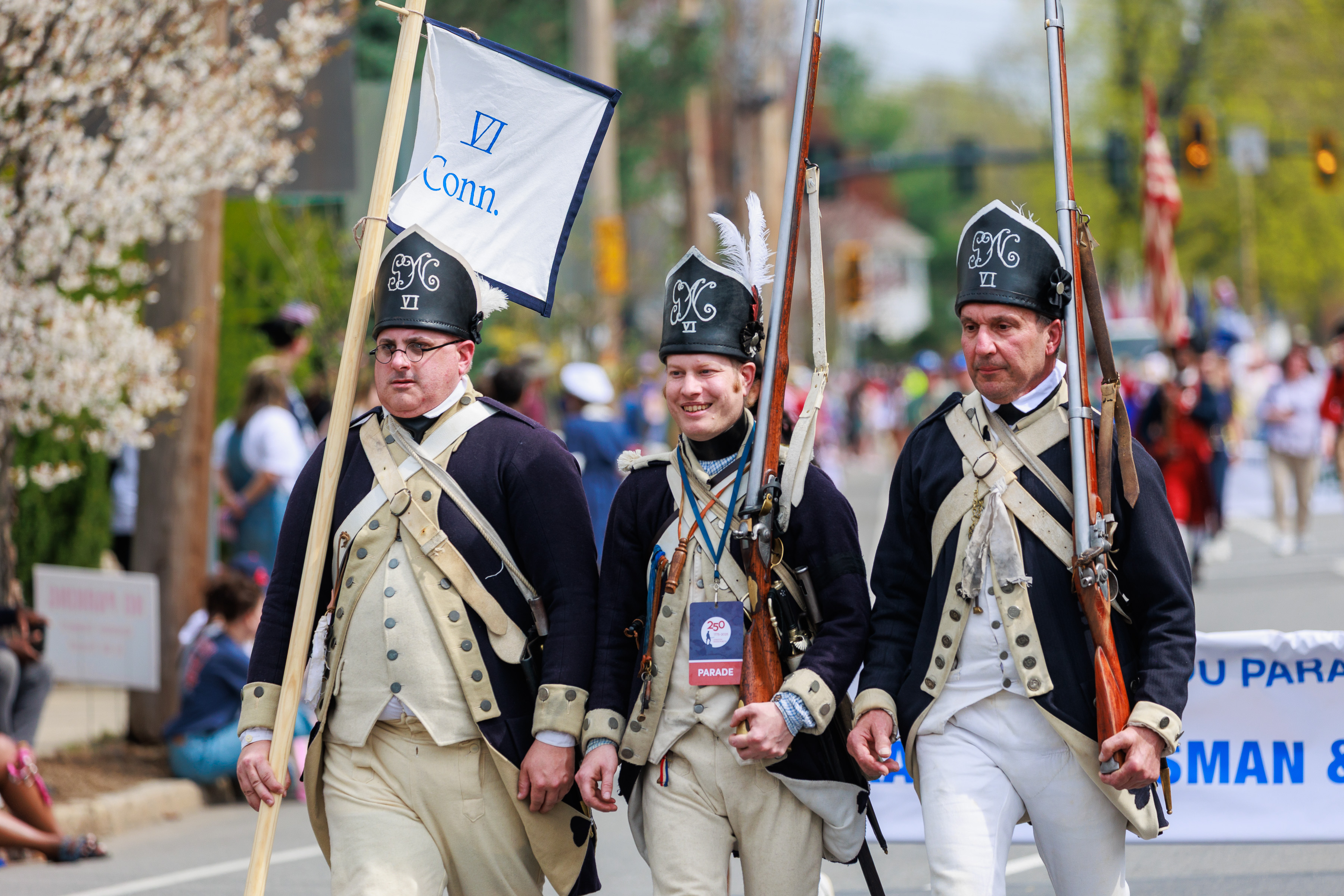
- Re-enactors of the 6th Connecticut Regiment at the 2025 Patriots' Day Parade in Lexington, Massachusetts
- Active: 1775-1783
- Allegiance: Continental Congress of the United States
- Type: Infantry
- Part of: Connecticut Line
- Engagements: New York Campaign

Commanders
- Notable commanders: Colonel Samuel Holden Parsons Colonel Return Jonathan Meigs

The 6th Connecticut Regiment was raised on May 1, 1775, at New Haven, Connecticut, as a provincial regiment for the Continental Army. It then became a regiment of the Continental Line on January 1, 1776, designated the 10th Continental Regiment, and a regiment of the Connecticut Line on January 1, 1777, again designated the 6th Connecticut. The regiment saw action at the siege of Boston, the Battle of Long Island, the New York Campaign, and its colonel and company of light infantry served in the Corps of Light Infantry at the Battle of Stony Point. The regiment was merged into the 1st Connecticut Regiment on January 1, 1783, at West Point, New York, and disbanded on November 16, 1783.

== History ==
The 6th Connecticut Regiment, a provincial regiment, was raised on May 1, 1775, under the command of Col. Samuel Holden Parsons. In June, under the "1st establishment" of the Continental Army, it joined Gen. George Washington at the Siege of Boston. In August, to promote cohesion among the various colonial units, regiments were given precedence by Washington and the 6th Connecticut was also designated the "13th Regiment of Foot." In September, in the "2nd establishment", Congress re-authorized the Continental Army for the year 1776, with Connecticut allocated to supply five regiments, to be numbered in the "Continental Line" as of January 1, 1776, and to serve until December 31, 1776. The 6th Connecticut became the 10th Continental Regiment on January 1, with Parsons as its colonel. On August 9, 1776, Parsons became a brigadier general in the Continental Armyand John Tyler, who had been appointed lieutenant colonel of the 10th Continentals on January 1, became its colonel.

During this period another regiment known as the "Connecticut State Regiment" was authorized by Connecticut on June 20, 1776, for home defense with William Douglas, then a captain of the 1st Connecticut Regiment, appointed as its colonel. The state regiment was raised at New Haven by Douglas and in Middletown by Return Jonathan Meigs, a major of the 2nd Connecticut Regiment then on parole after being captured during Arnold's Invasion of Canada.

The Continental Army was authorized under the "3rd establishment" on January 1, 1777, with enlistments to last for the duration of the war. Connecticut was now allocated to supply eight regiments of infantry. The 10th Continental Regiment became the 6th Regiment of the Connecticut Line on January 1, with Douglas appointed as it new colonel. Meigs, then lieutenant colonel of Sherburne's Additional Continental Regiment, returned to take command of the 6th Connecticut on May 12, 1777, when Douglas became ill. Douglas died on May 28 and Meigs was commissioned as colonel of the 6th Connecticut on September 10, with his date of rank retroactive to May 12.

The Raid on Sag Harbor was launched on May 21, 1777, but due to a storm and rough seas the raiding party put back to shore at Guilford, Connecticut to wait out the storm. Then on May 23, 1777, three weeks after the Battle of Ridgefield, Col. Meigs and 170 men from New Haven left Guilford, Connecticut, in 13 whale boats and two armed sloops, bringing with them an extra sloop in which to bring back prisoners. This raid was planned as a reprisal for the British Brig. Gen. William Tryon's raid on Danbury, Connecticut, whose action had cost the life of General David Wooster of New Haven. Landing on Long Island they marched across to Sag Harbor, surprised the garrison, burned a dozen vessels, destroyed a large quantity of military stores, killed several of the enemy and took 90 prisoners, without losing a man. For this action, Col. Meigs was voted a Sword by Congress, which now hangs in the National Museum of American History in Washington, D.C.

After the Sag Harbor raid, the 6th Connecticut went to Peekskill, New York, to join the other regiments of the Connecticut Line. The Connecticut Line wintered at West Point during the winter of 1777-1778. While there, they constructed the "Meigs Redoubt" and other fortifications in the area.

On 28 February, 1778 four whale boats under the command of Major Humphry landed near Smith-Town, Long Island. The raiding party burned a brig, a schooner and an armed sloop, captured two Captains and several seamen, and taking as many sails and rigging as could be taken off.

In the summer of 1778, the Connecticut Line was encamped with the Main Army under General Washington at White Plains, New York, near the site of the 1776 battle. It was here that the Connecticut Line was divided into two brigades, which stood until January 1, 1781. The 6th Connecticut was placed in the 1st Brigade under Parsons. From White Plains, they took up winter quarters at Redding, Connecticut. The troops built huts and settled in. Maj. Gen. Israel Putnam took command of all forces at Redding.

In the early part of 1779, the 6th Connecticut was encamped on the Highlands across from West Point. When Tryon raided Connecticut in July, the Connecticut Line was sent to defend its own state, but arrived after Tryon and his men had left.

The Connecticut Line was then called on to provide a number of Light Infantry Companies to join with Brig. Gen. "Mad" Anthony Wayne. Being a light infantry regiment, the 6th Connecticut filled the role perfectly and was sent, under Col. Meigs, to join with General Wayne.

On July 15, 1779, this force successfully stormed the British fort at Stony Point on the Hudson River.

From Stony Point, the 6th Connecticut was stationed with the Connecticut Line around West Point where it worked again on fortifications in the area. Maj. Gen. Baron Von Steuben praised the Connecticut Line for their proficiency on performing his manual of arms exercises.

The Morristown huts in New Jersey were the site of winter quarters for the two Connecticut Brigades in the winter of 1779-80. While the troops were in Morristown, the Connecticut troops protested their conditions and mutinied. Col. Meigs quelled this mutiny with reason and affection and with no loss of life. A letter from General Washington commended him for this action.

The Connecticut Line spent the summer of 1780 along the Hudson and while in Orange Town, New Jersey, heard of the treason of Connecticut's own Brig. Gen. Benedict Arnold and his flight to the British on September 25. The 6th Connecticut Regiment was ordered to West Point to defend any attack the enemy might have planned. There was no attack and Connecticut Line went into winter quarters near West Point.

In 1781, the 6th Connecticut was consolidated with part of the 4th as the Continental forces wound down their forces pending the outcome of peace talks in Paris. Peace came two years later in September 1783 with the signing of the Treaty of Paris.

== See also ==
- 1st Connecticut Regiment
