= 1804 Connecticut Secretary of the State election =

- April 9, 1804

Nominee	Samuel Wyllys	Henry Seymour
Party	Federalist	Democratic-Republican
Popular vote	7,369	3,788
Percentage	64.90%	33.40%
Secretary of the State before election
Samuel Wyllys
Federalist
Elected Secretary of the State
Samuel Wyllys
Federalist

The 1804 Connecticut Secretary of the State election was held on April 9, 1804, in order to elect the Secretary of the State of Connecticut. Incumbent Federalist Secretary of the State Samuel Wyllys won re-election against Democratic-Republican candidate Henry Seymour.

== General election ==
On election day, April 9, 1804, incumbent Federalist Secretary of the State Samuel Wyllys won re-election by a margin of 3,581 votes against his foremost opponent Democratic-Republican candidate Henry Seymour, thereby retaining Federalist control over the office of Secretary of the State. Wyllys was sworn in for his ninth term on May 10, 1804.

=== Results ===
Connecticut Secretary of the State election, 1804
Party	Candidate	Votes	%
Federalist	Samuel Wyllys (incumbent)	7,369	64.90
Democratic-Republican	Henry Seymour	3,788	33.40
	Scattering	196	1.70
Total votes		11,353	100.00
Federalist hold			
