= William Brenton Hall =

American physician

William Brenton Hall (May 31, 1764 – June 29, 1809) was an 18th-century physician in Connecticut, United States. He was the father of Senator Samuel H. P. Hall, and son-in-law of Revolutionary War General Samuel Holden Parsons.

== Biography ==
Born in Wallingford, Connecticut, William Brenton Hall was the eldest son of Brenton Hall, a prosperous farmer, and Lament Collins, daughter of Captain Jonathan and Agnes (Linn) Collins of Wallingford. Brenton Hall was son of Rev. Samuel Hall of Cheshire (Yale, 1716). Described by Ezra Stiles as the wealthiest minister in Connecticut, the Rev. Hall owned extensive properties in central Connecticut, as well as land inherited from his mother's prominent Rhode Island family, the Brentons.

Hall was extraordinarily well-connected. His uncle, Jonathan Law (Harvard 1695), served as Governor (1741–1750) and Chief Justice of Connecticut (1724–1741). His great-grandfather, served on the Governor's Council. His cousin, Lyman Hall, would serve as Governor of Georgia and would be signer of the Declaration of Independence. His uncle Elihu Hall (Yale 1731) was King's Attorney for the Colony. The land-rich Halls and their kin were pillars of the Old Light faction of Congregationalists that opposed the Great Awakening and the ascendant commercial interests associated with it.

William Brenton Hall attended local schools and was prepared for Yale by the Rev. Enoch Huntington of Middletown. He entered the college in 1782. On graduating in 1786, he went to Philadelphia to attend medical lectures at Pennsylvania Hospital, then completed his training with Dr. Jared Potter of Wallingford (Yale 1760). He set up practice in Middletown, then the largest city in the state and one of its most prosperous seaports.

In 1796, Dr. Hall married Mehetable Parsons, daughter of Revolutionary hero, Major General Samuel Holden Parsons (Harvard 1756), who had died while serving as Chief Justice of the Northwest Territory. The marriage brought him substantial land holdings in Ohio, as well as a host of distinguished relatives, including brothers-in-law, Stephen Titus Hosmer, who would become Chief Justice of the State of Connecticut, Enoch Parsons, who would head the Middletown branch of the Bank of the United States, and Samuel Holden Parsons, who would long serve as High Sheriff of Middlesex County.

Better prepared than most of his apprenticeship-trained contemporaries, Hall quickly became one of the leading physicians in the state. He pioneered obstetrics, guided by the detailed illustrated manuals, published in Edinburgh, that he brought back from his studies in Philadelphia. He was particularly concerned with epidemic disease, repeatedly petitioning town authorities in Wallingford and Middletown for permission to establish a "pock house" for inoculating against small pox.

Hall's anti-federalist political inclinations may have helped him to develop a relationship with Boston physician Benjamin Waterhouse, a correspondent of British physician Edward Jenner, discoverer of vaccination. Jenner sent samples of cowpox matter to Waterhouse, some of which may have been passed on to Hall, who appears to have been the first physician in Connecticut to practice vaccination.

In 1796, Hall played a heroic role during a yellow fever epidemic at Knowles Landing, south of Middletown on the Connecticut River. When all the village's established physicians had fled, Hall stayed on to care for the sick and bury the dead. His exploits were reported in Miner & Tully's Essays on Fevers (1823), a pioneering study of epidemic disease.

Hall played a leading role in organizing the Connecticut Medical Society and served as its treasurer from 1799 until his death a decade later. He was noted as an educator of physicians and often had as many as six apprentices residing with him in his spacious house on Middletown's Main Street (William Brenton Hall Account Book, 1807–1809).

As Federalists struggled to take control of the Medical Society in 1807, Hall and his Jeffersonian friends, who were officers of the society, became the object of a vicious satirical poem by physician and wit, Mason Fitch Cogswell:

   Next see arise and puff across the stage,
   The learned puppet of this learned age.
   This pious child in Middletown appears,
   With tongue much more supplied, than brains, or ears. . . .
   With him, to make young Doctors rules are vain,
   "Blair's Lectures" only, make the business plain,
   With these in hand, he turns them out as fast
   As tramping tinkers pewter buttons cast.
   Strange, very strange, that in one soul we find
   Such great and numerous offices combined;
   Surgeon, Demagogue, Preceptor, Preacher,
   Dentist, Physician, Midwife, Rhetoric-teacher,
   Moral Philosopher, Schoolmaster, all
   Unite & harmonize in Doctor Hall.

== Death ==
According to his contemporaries, alcoholism was an occupational disease for physicians in this era. Hall, known to be a heavy drinker, began to fail in the spring of 1809. Attempting to visit a patient in June 1809, he fell from his horse and died of his injuries on June 29, aged 45. He was buried in the Liberty Street Cemetery in Middletown. He left a widow and two young sons, William Brenton Hall Jr. and State Senator Samuel H. P. Hall (1804–1877).

== Posthumous ==
Despite the advantages of pedigree and education, Hall was handicapped by the time and place in which he lived. The extensive kinship network of which he was a part would have served him well had the Old Lights been able to maintain their political dominance. Defeats at the polls and in ecclesiastical tribunals pushed them to the margins. Many, like Hall and his father Brenton (who represented Meriden in the legislature for many terms), became anti-federalists and ardent Jeffersonians. Others, like Hall's siblings, abandoned the established Congregational church for dissenting sects. This constituted a major obstacle to success in a state dominated by an oppressive Federalist-Congregationalist political machine.

Had Hall followed his Yale classmate and fellow physician Elihu Hubbard Smith to New York City—where political and religious heterodoxy was tolerated—he might have had a more distinguished career. Smith, who also studied medicine at Pennsylvania Hospital, established himself in New York, where he founded America's first medical journal,The Medical Repository.
