= Meigs Raid =

Military raid by American Continental Army forces

Coordinates: 40°59′48″N 72°17′32″W

- Part of the American Revolutionary War
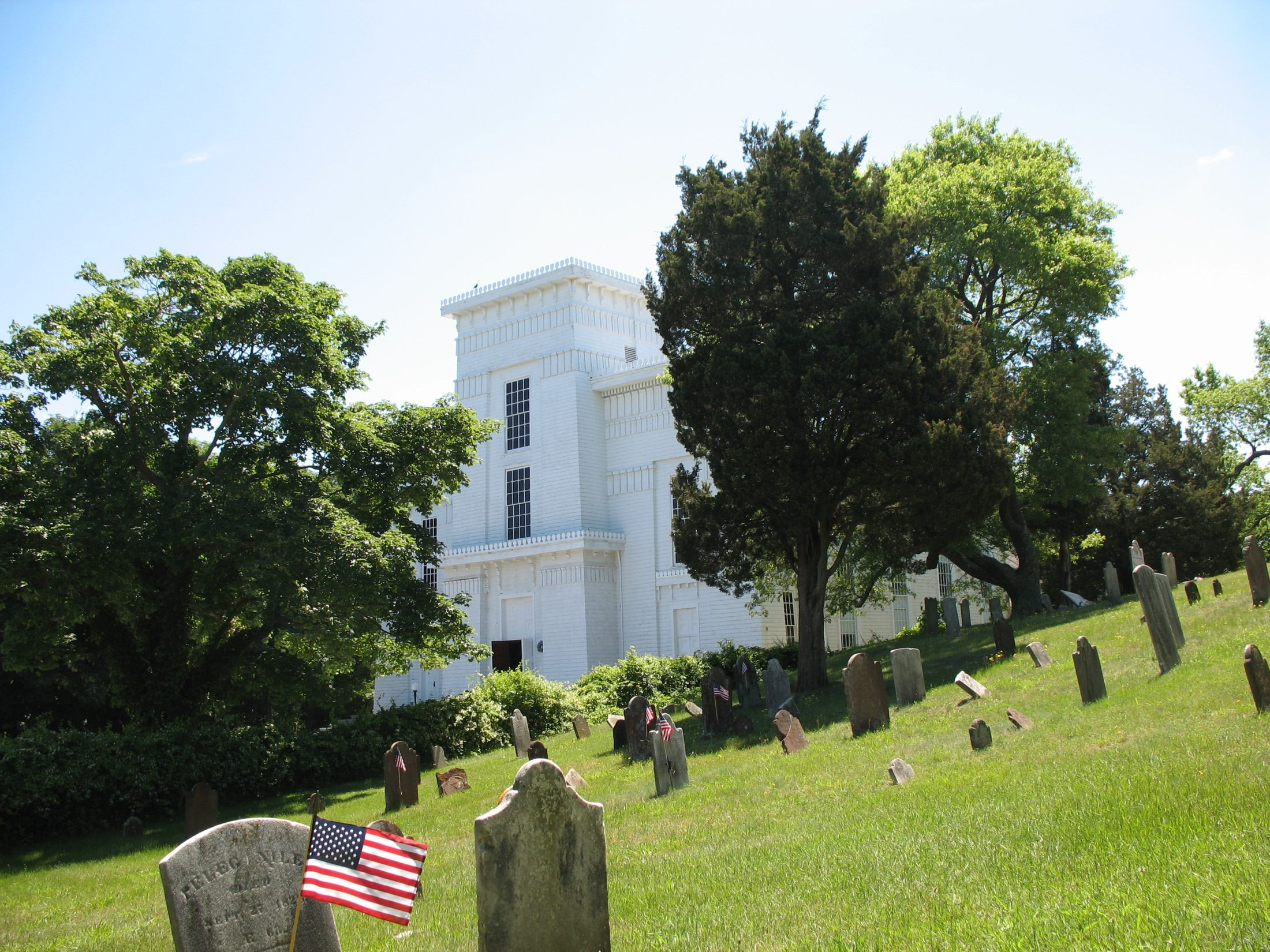
- The "Old Burial Ground", which adjoins the Whaler's Church on Meeting House Hill, was a site of battle in the raid
Date	May 24, 1777; a Saturday
Location	Sag Harbor, New York
Result	American victory

Belligerents
United States	Great Britain

Commanders and leaders
Return Jonathan Meigs	James Raymond (POW)

Strength
Expedition: 234; Assault: 130	Garrison: 70 men 1 armed schooner (personnel unknown) 12 small boats (about 40 men)

Casualties and losses
None	6 killed 90 captured 12 small boats sunk

The Meigs Raid (also known as the Battle of Sag Harbor) was a military raid by American Continental Army forces, under the command of Connecticut Colonel Return Jonathan Meigs, on a British Loyalist foraging party at Sag Harbor, New York on May 24, 1777, during the American Revolutionary War. Six Loyalists were killed and 90 captured while the Americans suffered no casualties. The raid was made in response to a successful British raid on Danbury, Connecticut in late April that was opposed by American forces in the Battle of Ridgefield.

Organized in New Haven, Connecticut by Brigadier General Samuel Holden Parsons, the expedition crossed Long Island Sound from Guilford on May 23, dragged whaleboats across the North Fork of Long Island, and raided Sag Harbor early the next morning, destroying boats and supplies.

== Background ==
The American Revolutionary War was a qualified success for the British in 1776. After being forced to abandon Boston, they captured New York City, but were unable to hold New Jersey when General George Washington surprised them at Trenton and Princeton. The British consolidated their hold on New York City and Long Island during the winter months of early 1777, while the Continental Army established a land blockade around the city in New Jersey, southern New York, and southwestern Connecticut.

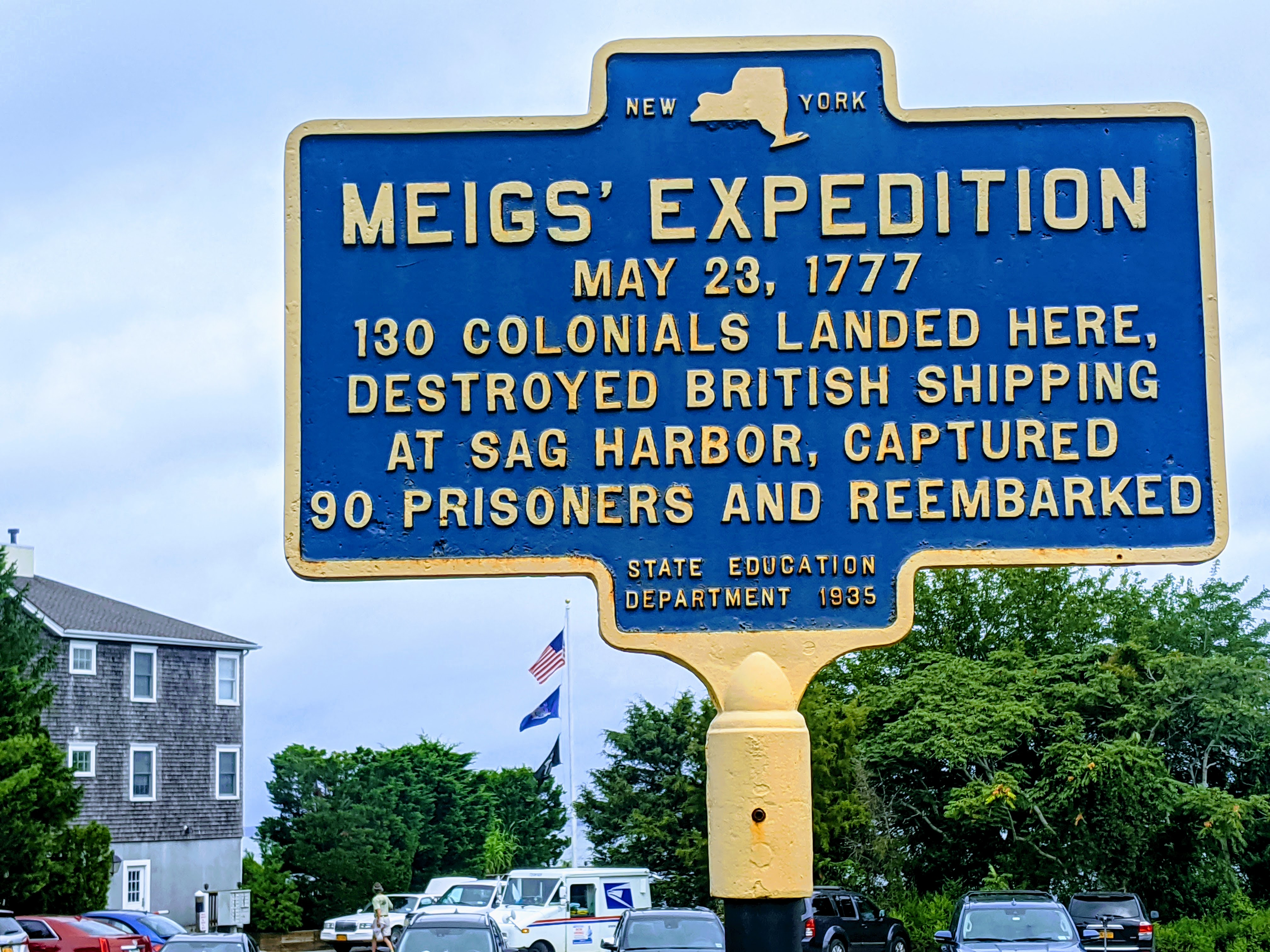
Historical landmark marker Meigs' Expedition

In the spring of 1777, Lieutenant General William Howe launched raiding expeditions against Continental Army and local militia storage depots near the city. A successful raid against Peekskill, New York in March prompted him to organize a more ambitious expedition to raid a depot in Danbury, Connecticut. This expedition, led by the former royal governor of New York, William Tryon, successfully reached Danbury from a landing point in Fairfield, Connecticut on April 26, and destroyed provisions and supplies. The Connecticut militia had mobilized, and over the next two days skirmished with the British as they marched back to their ships, most notably on April 27 at Ridgefield. General Samuel Holden Parsons, leading Connecticut's defenses, decided to organize an act of reprisal.

An opportunity arose when they learned that a British foraging expedition had landed at Sag Harbor, Long Island. Sag Harbor had been occupied by British troops after the August 1776 Battle of Long Island, and they had established a strong defensive position on Meeting House Hill, with earthwork fortifications and palisades. The town was well-situated for providing supplies to the Royal Navy, which used Gardiner's Bay as an anchorage while patrolling the eastern end of Long Island Sound. The forage expedition consisted of 12 smaller boats protected by a schooner mounting 12 guns; the small boats were manned by crews totaling about 40 men. Sag Harbor was at the time garrisoned by 70 men from the Loyalist battalion of Lieutenant Colonel Stephen De Lancey. The detachment was under the command of Captain James Raymond.

== Raid ==
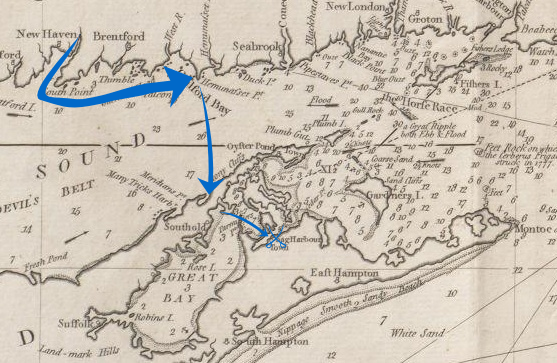
A 1794 map annotated to show the raid's route

Parsons gave command of the expedition to Colonel Return Jonathan Meigs. According to Parsons' report to General Washington, they assembled a force totalling 234 men at New Haven from several regiments, and rowed in 13 whaleboats from New Haven to Guilford on May 21. Rough seas and high winds prevented them from crossing for two days; when they finally left Guilford on the afternoon of May 23, they were accompanied on the crossing by two armed sloops and one that was unarmed. Only 170 made the crossing to the vicinity of Southold, New York, where they arrived around 6 pm. Meigs learned that most of the British forces in the area had been ordered to march to New York City, and that only the small force of Loyalists was left at Sag Harbor. He had his men portage 11 of the whaleboats across the North Fork to the bay, and launched those boats with 130 men to cross the bay to Sag Harbor. By midnight they had crossed the bay and landed about 4 miles (6.4 km) from the harbor. Meigs formed his men up and marched to the harbor, arriving about 2 am.

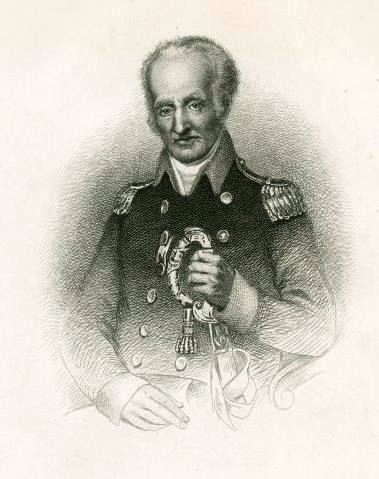
Return Jonathan Meigs

Meigs divided his force in two. One detachment stormed the earthworks, while the other went to the harbor, where they destroyed British boats and collected provisions. The land attack was conducted in silence with fixed bayonets and only one shot was said to have been fired. The schooner opened fire on the attackers as they burned the boats, but sources are unclear if the schooner itself was taken and destroyed. Twelve boats were destroyed, and the raiders took 53 prisoners at the earth works and another 37 at the wharf, suffering no casualties in the process. The prisoners were taken back to Connecticut.

== Aftermath ==
Long Island's Loyalist communities organized their own response to the raid. In May 1779, nine Loyalists crossed the sound and captured Connecticut militia general Gold Selleck Silliman at his home, and took him back to Long Island. Connecticut Patriots captured a judge on Long Island in November 1779, who they exchanged for General Silliman in May 1780.

Parsons organized another expedition across Long Island Sound in August 1777. This one, against a Loyalist outpost at Setauket, was unsuccessful. Colonel Meigs was rewarded by the Second Continental Congress with "an elegant sword". A stone commemorating the battle was placed on the site on May 23, 1902.

== See also ==
- Whaleboat War
