= Setauket Presbyterian Church and Burial Ground =

Historic church in New York, United States

- U.S. National Register of Historic Places
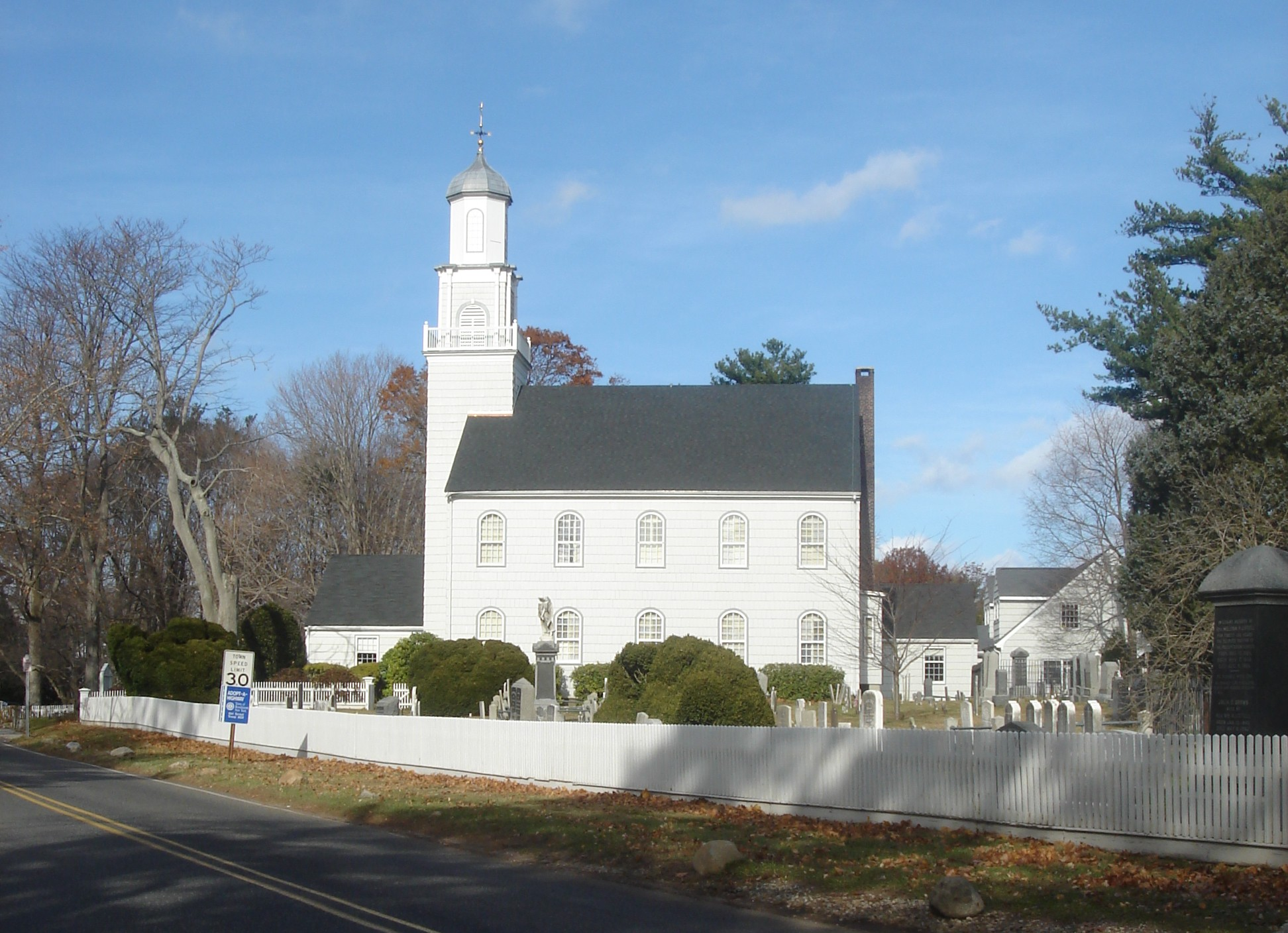
- The church as seen from Caroline Avenue in December 2007

- Location within New York Location within the United States
- Location: 5 Caroline Ave., Village of Setauket, New York
- Coordinates: 40°56′46″N 73°06′39″W
- Area: 6 acres (2.4 ha)
- Built: 1812
- Architect: Satterly, William S.; Tooker, Clark
- Architectural style: Federal
- NRHP reference No.: 96001023
- Added to NRHP: September 27, 1996

Setauket Presbyterian Church and Burial Ground, also known as First Presbyterian Church of Brookhaven, is a historic Presbyterian church and cemetery at 5 Caroline Avenue in the hamlet of Setauket, New York, United States.

== History ==
The church was built in 1812 in the Federal style and is a three-by-five-bay, heavy timber framed, 38-by-40-foot (12 by 12 m) building sheathed in wood shingles and covered by a gable roof. The center bay features an 11-by-8-foot (3.4 by 2.4 m) bell tower / narthex. The burial ground was established in the 1660s and contains approximately 800 gravesites. The church grounds were the site of a Loyalist fortification that was attacked by Continental Army forces from Connecticut in August 1777.

Prior to this, existed an earlier presbyterian church on the village green, which was later burned down after being struck by lightning. The present church was rebuilt in 1812.

The burial ground contains the remains of some of the earliest pastors of the church including Nathaniel Brewster (1600–1690), George Phillips (1660–1739) (grandson of Rev. George Phillips), and Benjamin Talmadge (1723–1786) (father of Benjamin Tallmadge), among others. Also many of the founding families of the area are buried here including the Bayles, Davis, Dickinsons, Floyds. Hawkins, Jaynes, Jones, Satterlys, Smiths and Woodhulls, including the resting place of Abraham Woodhull, leader of the Culper spy ring against the British during the American Revolution. As Setauket was his home town, artist William Sidney Mount (1807–1868) is buried here too.

The church and burial ground were added to the National Register of Historic Places in 1996.

== Images ==
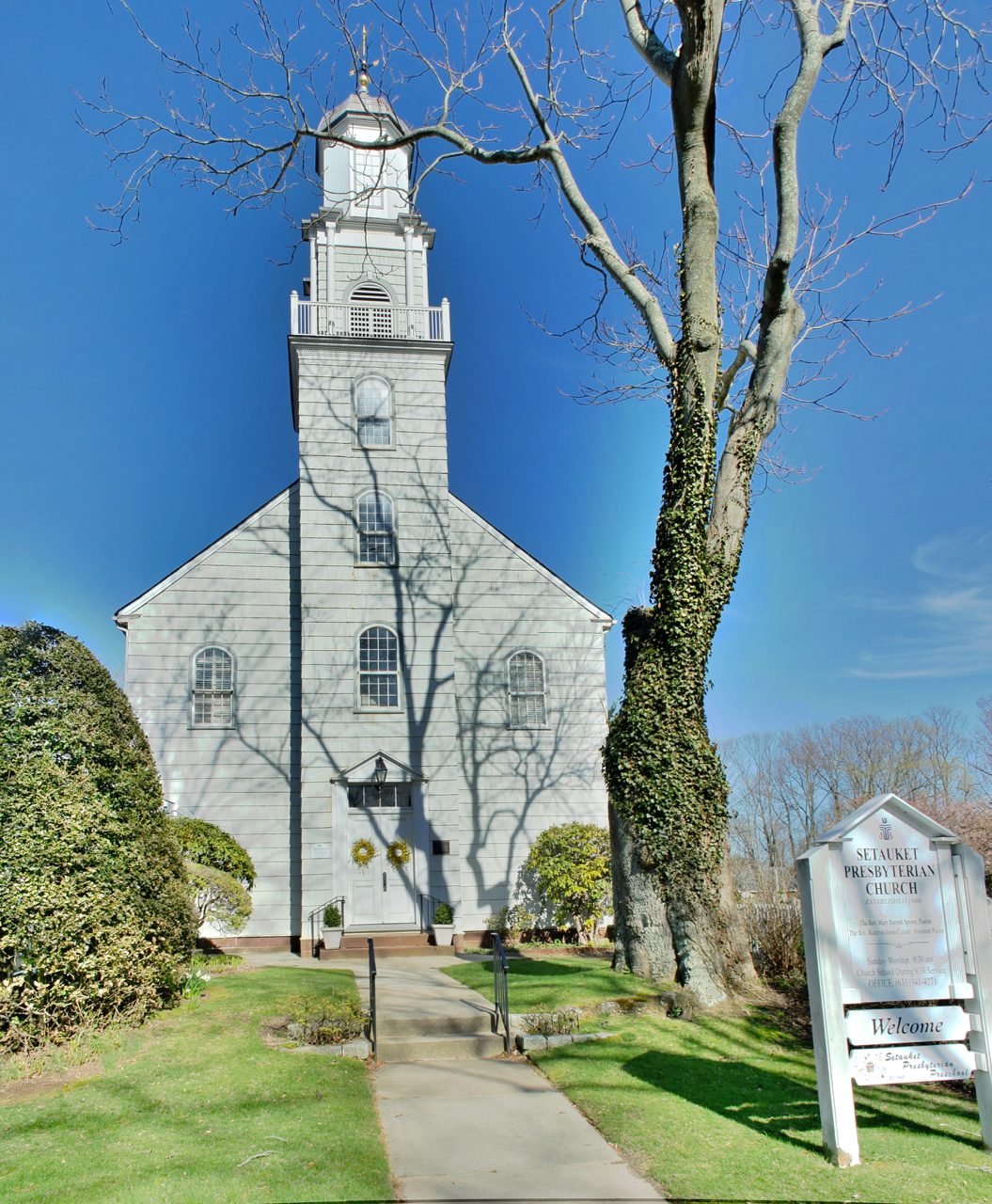
Setauket Presbyterian Church in 2015, from Caroline Street
