= Samuel Holden Parsons =

American lawyer, jurist, and general in the Continental Army

- Born: May 14, 1737; Lyme, Connecticut
- Died: November 17, 1789 (aged 52); Beaver River (Pennsylvania)
- Military career
- Allegiance: United States of America
- Branch: Continental Army
- Rank: Major General
- Conflicts: American Revolutionary War
- Other work: pioneer to the Ohio Country

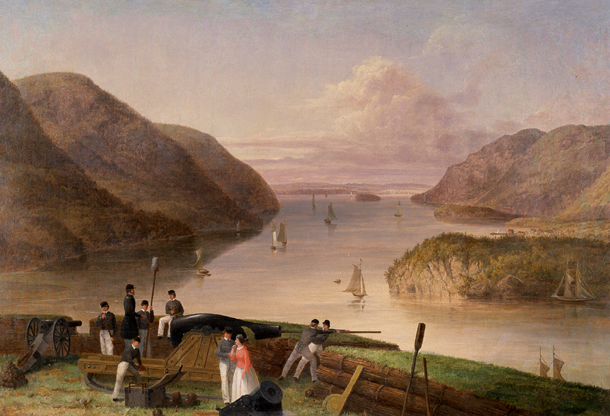
The Fort of West Point, New York, Gen. Holden Parsons was its commander

Samuel Holden Parsons (May 14, 1737 – November 17, 1789) was an American lawyer, jurist, general in the Continental Army during the American Revolutionary War, and a pioneer to the Ohio Country. Parsons was described as "Soldier, scholar, judge, one of the strongest arms on which Washington leaned, who first suggested the Continental Congress, from the story of whose life could almost be written the history of the Northern War" by Senator George F. Hoar of Massachusetts

Parsons was born in Lyme, Connecticut, the son of Jonathan Parsons and Phoebe (Griswold) Parsons. At the age of nine, his family moved to Newburyport, Massachusetts, where his father, an ardent supporter of the First Great Awakening, took charge of the town's new Presbyterian congregation.

Parsons graduated from Harvard College in 1756 and returned to Lyme to study law in the office of his uncle, Connecticut governor Matthew Griswold (governor). He was admitted to the bar in 1759, and started his law practice in Lyme. In 1761, he married Mehitabel Mather (1743–1802), a great-great-great-granddaughter of Rev. Richard Mather. Well-connected politically, he was elected to the General Assembly in 1762, where he remained a representative until his removal to New London.

== Revolutionary activist ==
Actively involved in Patriot circles on the eve of the American Revolutionary War, he was a member of New London's Committee of Correspondence. In March 1772, he wrote to Massachusetts leader Samuel Adams, suggesting a congress of the colonies: "I take the liberty to propose for your consideration", he wrote, "whether it would not be advisable in the present critical situation to revive an institution which formerly had a very salutary effect – I mean an annual meeting of commissioners from the colonies to consult on their general welfare."

Parsons went on to suggest that the time for discussing colonial independence from Britain was at hand: "The idea of inalienable allegiance to any prince or state, is an idea to me inadmissible; and I cannot but see that our ancestors, when they first landed in America, were as independent of the crown or king of Great Britain, as if they hade never been his subjects; and the only rightful authority derived to him over this people, was by explicit covenant contained in the first charters."

== Military career ==
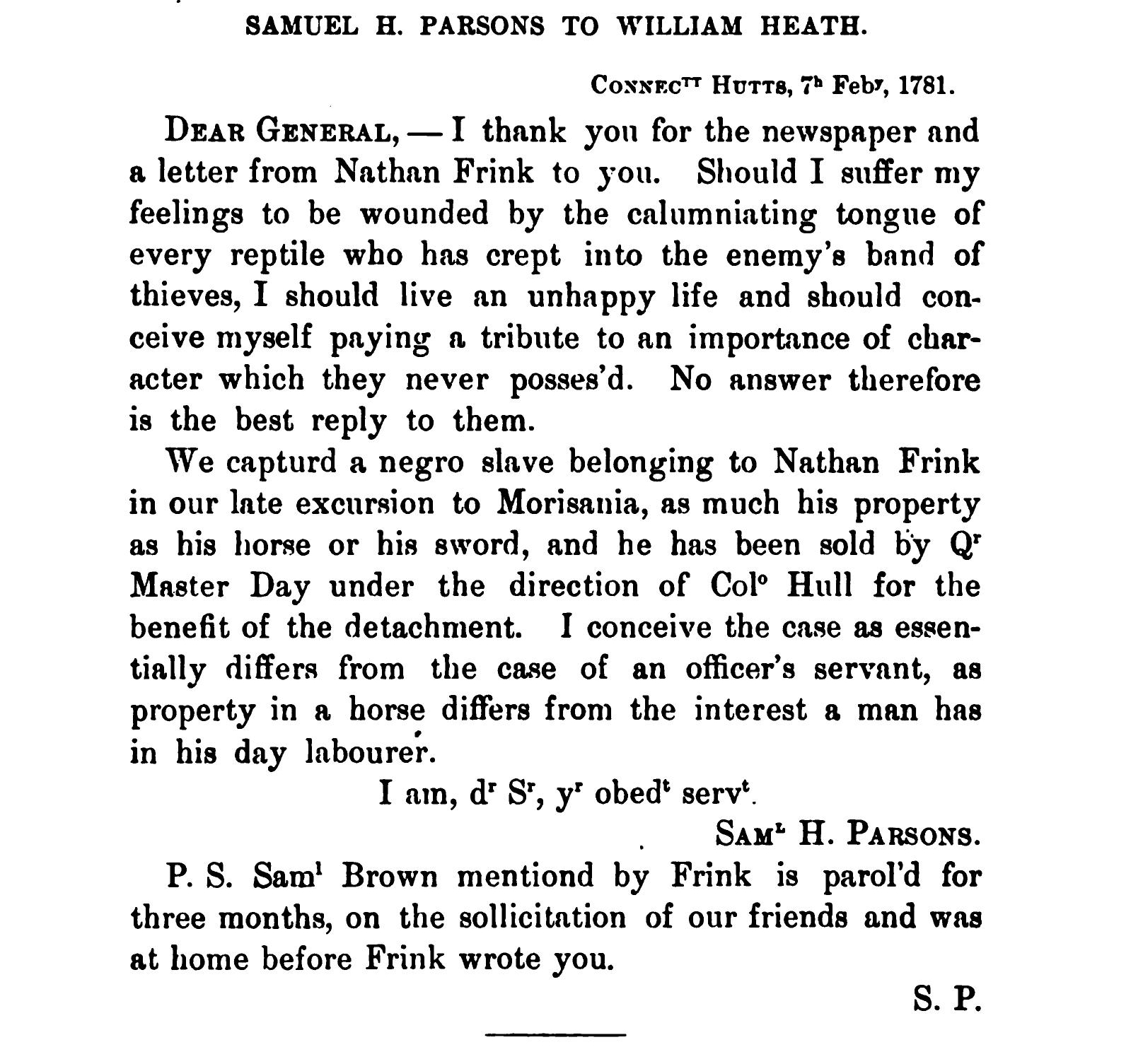
In February 1781, Gnl. Parsons wrote to Gnl. Heath, referencing a letter that Nathan Frink had written to Heath insulting Parsons. Parsons notes that they have captured "a negro slave" belonging to Frink and sold him to raise funds for to benefit the soldiers involved.

In April 1775, immediately after the battles of Lexington and Concord, Parsons, along with colleagues in the Connecticut legislature, began promoting a project to take Fort Ticonderoga from the British, securing commitments of both public and private funds to underwrite the expedition.

Like most active politicians of the period, Parsons served as a militia leader. He was appointed Major of the 14th Connecticut, Militia Regiment in 1770. In 1775, he was commissioned Colonel of the 6th Connecticut Regiment, a new regiment raised "for the special defence and safety of the Colony". In June he was ordered to lead his regiment to Boston, where he fought in the Battle of Bunker Hill. He remained in Boston until the British evacuated the city in March 1776.

In August 1776 Congress appointed Parsons Brigadier General in the Continental Army. He was ordered to New York with his brigade of about 2,500 men. Stationed in Brooklyn, Parsons, under Lord Stirling, was in the thick of the fighting against the British at Battle Hill on August 27, 1776. He took part in the Council of War on August 29, at which it was decided to retreat from New York. Parsons successfully transported his men from Long Island, joining the main body of the army as it withdrew from the city.

While in New York, Parsons played a central role in the American efforts to attack the Royal Navy. David Bushnell, an inventor from Connecticut, had devised a submarine called Turtle which he planned to use to attach torpedoes to British warships. Parsons selected his brother-in-law, Sergeant Ezra Lee, to undertake this risky mission. Lee succeeded in reaching the British flagship HMS Eagle undetected, but was unable to attach the torpedo to its hull. The torpedo exploded, much to the consternation of the British, but without causing any harm to Eagle.

After the retreat from New York, Parsons' brigade was assigned to General Israel Putnam's division north of the city. He fought in the battle of White Plains. In January 1777, he returned to Connecticut to help recruit the Connecticut Line to bolster depleted Continental forces. He led raids on Loyalist enclaves on Long Island, and took part in efforts to defend Connecticut towns against raids by British forces under General William Tryon. He organized the raid led by Return J. Meigs Sr. against Sag Harbor in retaliation for Tryon's raid on Danbury, and led a failed assault on Setauket, New York in August 1777.

In the winter of 1777–78, Parsons took command of West Point, and began building its fortifications. At the end of 1778, he joined Connecticut troops at winter quarters in Redding. In December 1779, Parsons took command of Putnam's Division, and spent the following months recruiting, training, and trying to engage British General Sir Henry Clinton in battle. The high point of this period was the discovery, in September 1780, of Benedict Arnold's plan to surrender West Point to the British. Parsons served on the board of officers which tried Arnold's accomplice, Major John André, and ultimately sentenced him to death.

On October 23, 1780 Parsons was promoted to Major General. In the winter of 1781 he helped suppress the mutinies of soldiers in Pennsylvania and New Jersey, and took part in efforts to clear out Tory militias in Westchester, north of New York. After months of containing British forces in New York, American troops, now bolstered by French reinforcements, departed for Virginia. Parsons and his troops were left behind to keep the British contained.

In July 1782, following the Franco-American victory at the siege of Yorktown at Yorktown, Virginia, Parsons – broken physically and financially – tendered his resignation to Congress. Forty-five years old, he had served continuously since the Lexington Alarm of 1775.

== Civilian life ==
On the eve of the war, Parsons had moved his family to Middletown, Connecticut, which was then a prosperous port on the Connecticut River. He returned there during the summer of 1782, hoping to revive his law practice, his political career, and his depleted finances. Something of a celebrity, Parsons was elected to the legislature, became involved in organizing the Connecticut branch of the Society of the Cincinnati, and was appointed by Congress to help with Indian diplomacy on the western frontier.

In 1785 Parsons made a trip along the Ohio River valley and discovered ancient fortifications near the confluence of the Muskingum River and the Ohio, at what is today Marietta, Ohio. The fortifications, a complex of pyramidal mounds and walled enclosures, today referred to as the Marietta Earthworks, had apparently been abandoned long before Europeans arrived in North America. Parsons wrote a detailed description of the site in a letter in 1786 to Ezra Stiles, the president of Yale University, who was so interested that he forwarded the letter to Thomas Jefferson, who was equally fascinated by the topic.

In March 1787, Parsons became a director of the Ohio Land Company, a scheme that enabled ex-Revolutionary officers to trade their pay certificates for Ohio lands. Parsons played a leading role in persuading Congress to sell land to the company, and then jockeyed for appointment to a leading position in the territory. Though aspiring to the governorship—which was later awarded to General Arthur St. Clair—Parsons was appointed Chief Justice. In the midst of this, Parsons was also an active member of the Connecticut Convention for adopting the U.S. Constitution.

== Frontier jurist ==
In March 1788, Parsons and his son Enoch, who had been appointed Registrar and Clerk of Probate, set out for the Northwest Territory. They arrived at Marietta, Ohio—a settlement of some fifty houses—in May 1788. Parsons was one of the early pioneers to the Northwest Territory. Lacking a clergyman, Parsons filled in as leader of sabbath services. During the following months, Parsons busied himself with surveying the Ohio Company's lands and purchasing choice parcels for himself and his family.

On November 1, 1789, Parsons wrote to his wife in Connecticut from Pittsburgh, stating that he was about to "set out for Lake Erie to survey the Connecticut lands (Connecticut Western Reserve)." It was on this trip that he was killed trying to shoot the rapids in a canoe on the Beaver River.

A letter written by Richard Butler, dated November 25, 1789, relates the circumstances of Parsons' death:

I am sorry to inform you that I have every reason to fear that our old friend, General Parsons, is no more. He left this place [Pittsburgh] in company with Captain Heart, (who is sent to explore the communication by way of the Beaver to Cuyahoga and the Lake), on the 5th instant, he had sent a man with his horses from the place where he had encamped the night before, and directed him to tell Lieut. McDowell, who commanded the Block House below the falls of Beaver, that he (General Parsons) would be there to dinner. A snow had fallen in the night which had retarded the progress of the man with the horses. At one place on the Beaver shore he saw where a canoe had landed, and a person got out to warm his feet by walking about, as he saw he had kicked against the trees and his tracks to the canoe again. The man did not get down till evening, but about noon the canoe, broken in pieces, came by the Block House, and some articles known to belong to General Parsons were taken up and others seen to pass. Lieut. McDowell has diligent search made for the body of the General, but made no discovery.

Parsons' body was found the following May and was buried with the expectation that it would be more suitably interred. Because of the series of mishaps, the location of his burial was lost. The General now lies in an unknown/unmarked grave on the banks of the Beaver River near the vicinity of New Brighton, Pennsylvania and Beaver Falls, Pennsylvania in Pennsylvania. He has a cenotaph memorial in Middletown Connecticut. After his death, due to the depreciation of currency values, after Letters of Administration were sent in 1789 to his son Enoch, "..His estates, both in Middletown and Marietta, were found to be insolvent.."

== Parsons' children ==
Parsons' surviving children included:

- William Walter Parsons (1762–1802). Served as a midshipman during the Revolution, wherein he was taken prisoner by the British during the disastrous Penobscot Expedition. He eventually settled in Bangor, Maine.
- Enoch Parsons (1769–1846). Accompanied his father to Ohio, where he served as Registrar and Clerk of Probate. Returning to Connecticut after his father's death, he served as High Sheriff of Middlesex County for 28 years and as President of the Middletown Branch of the Bank of the United States from 1818 to 1824.
- Samuel Holden Parsons (1777–1811). Middletown merchant in West Indies trade.
- Lucia Parsons (1764–1825). Married Stephen Titus Hosmer, Chief Justice of Connecticut. Her daughter, Sarah Mehitabel Hosmer (1793–1834), married Major Andre Andrews (1792–1834), second Mayor of Buffalo.
- Mehetable Parsons (1772–1825). Married William Brenton Hall, Middletown physician.
- Margaret Parsons (1785–1853). Married 1st Stephen Hubbard of Middletown; married 2nd Alfred Hubbard Lathrop-a grandson from her marriage to Alfred Lathrop was the author George Parsons Lathrop married to Rose Hawthorne daughter of Nathaniel Hawthorne

== See also ==
- Battle of Norwalk

== Bibliography ==
- Baker, Mark (2104). Connecticut Families of the Revolution, American Forebears from Burr to Wolcott, The History Press, Charleston, SC (2014).
- Hall, Charles S.: Hall Ancestry. G.P. Putnam's Sons, New York, New York (1896).
- Hall, Charles S.: Life and Letters of Samuel Holden Parsons, Major General in The Continental Army and Chief Judge of the Northwestern Territory, Otseningo Publishing Co., Binghamton, New York (1905).
- Heitman, Francis B.: Officers of the Continental Army during the War of the Revolution, Rare Book Shop Publishing Co., Washington, D.C. (1914).
- Hildreth, Samuel P.: Biographical and Historical Memoirs of the Early Pioneer Settlers of Ohio, H. W. Derby and Co., Cincinnati, Ohio (1852).
- Hinman, Royal R.: A Historical Collection of the part sustained by Connecticut during the War of the Revolution, printed by E. Gleason, Hartford, Connecticut (1842).
- Leiter, M. T.: Biographical Sketches of the Generals of the Continental Army of the Revolution, University Press: John Wilson and Son, Cambridge, Massachusetts (1889).
- McCullough, David (2019). The Pioneers: The Heroic Story of the Settlers who Brought the American Ideal West. New York: Simon & Schuster. ISBN 978-1501168680.
- Shipton, Clifford K.: Harvard Graduates: Biographical Sketches of Those Who Attended Harvard College, Harvard University Press, Cambridge, Massachusetts (1968).
