= Richard Hewlett (military officer) =

British American officer

- Born: November 1, 1729; Merrick, New York
- Died: July 26, 1789 (aged 59); Queenstown, New Brunswick, Canada
- Burial place: St. Stephen's Anglican Church, Queenstown, New Brunswick
- Spouse: Mary Townsend (m. 1753)
- Children: 11
- Military career
- Allegiance: (Kingdom of Great Britain) Great Britain
- Royal Provincials: 3rd Battalion (later 2nd), DeLancey's Brigade
- Service years: 1776–1783
- Rank: Lieutenant Colonel
- Conflicts: American Revolutionary War: Battle of Setauket

Richard Hewlett (November 1, 1729 – July 26, 1789) was an American Loyalist officer of the 3rd Battalion, DeLancey's Brigade, a Royal Provincial Regiment based in New York. He is most notable for leading the British side in the Battle of Setauket. He married Mary Townsend on December 6, 1753, at St. George's Church. Together, they had 11 children.
