= Return J. Meigs Sr. =

American military officer (1740 - 1823)

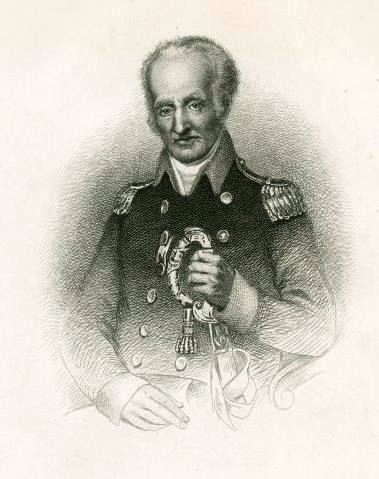
- Born: Return Jonathan Meigs; December 28, 1740; Middletown, Connecticut, British America
- Died: January 28, 1823 (aged 82); McMinn, Tennessee, U.S.
- Burial place: Rhea County, Tennessee
- Spouse(s): Joanna Winborn (m. 1764; died 1773) Grace Starr (m. 1774)
- Relatives: Josiah Meigs (brother)

Return Jonathan Meigs (December 28, 1740 – January 28, 1823) (Note: Old style: December 17, 1740) was a colonel in the Continental Army during the American Revolutionary War, and an early settler of the Northwest Territory. From 1801 until his death in 1823, he served as an Indian agent to the Cherokee Indians in the southern Appalachian Mountains. Meigs was a conscientious and efficient agent in some respects, but also persuaded and bribed Cherokee leaders to cede much of their land to the United States. The land cessions were controversial, opposed by most Cherokee, and were a prelude to the Trail of Tears when the Cherokee were forced to leave their homeland and settle in Oklahoma.

== Early life ==
Meigs was born in Middletown, Connecticut, on December 28, 1740, to Jonathan Meigs and Elizabeth Hamlin Meigs. Their 13 children included his brother Josiah Meigs. His father was a hatter. As a young man, Meigs entered a mercantile business. He married Joanna Winborn in 1764. Before her death in 1773, they had four children, including Return Jonathan Meigs Jr. In 1774, Meigs married Grace Starr, with whom he had three children, of whom two survived.

== American Revolutionary War ==
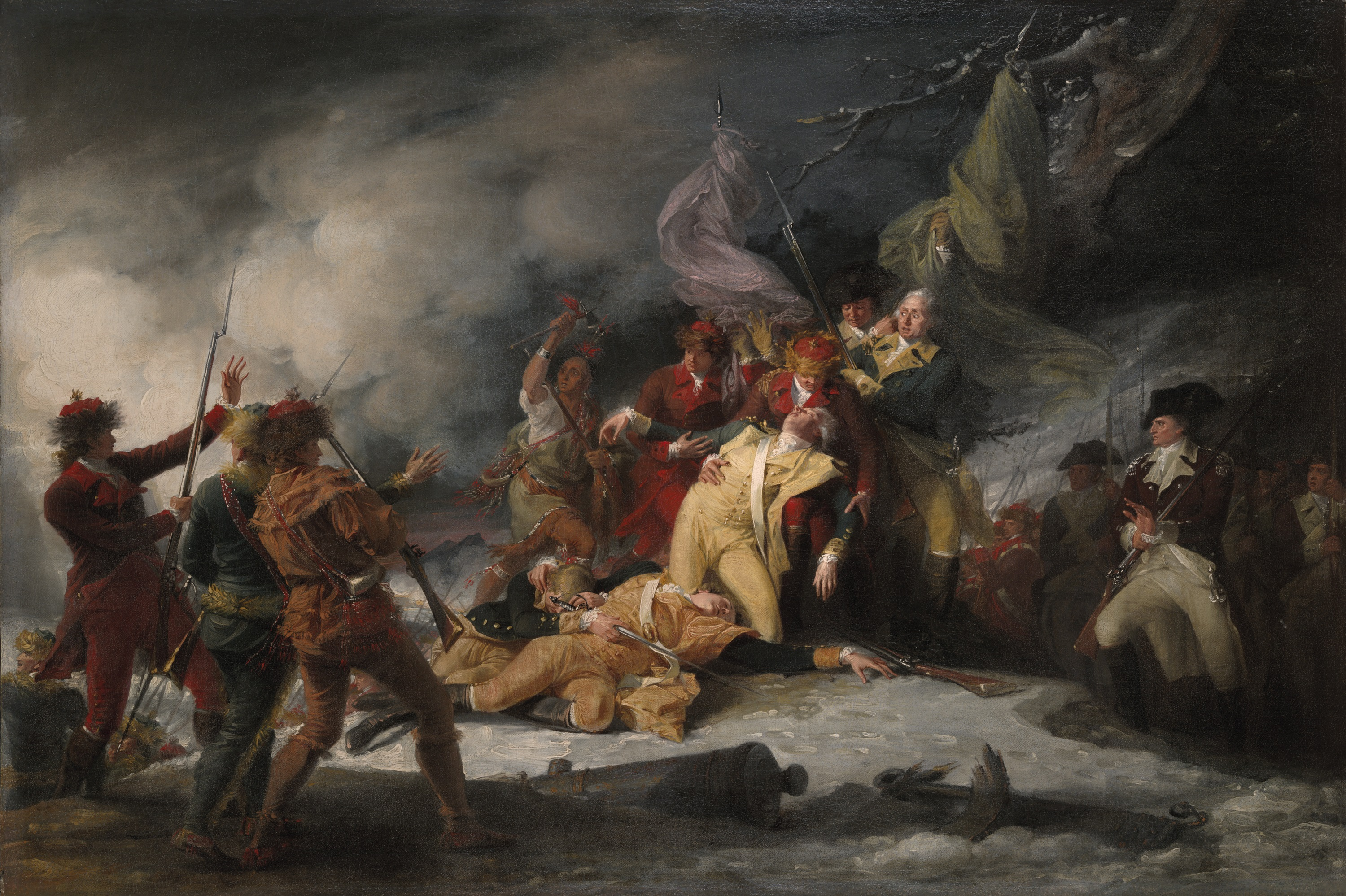
Meigs is shown in the left foreground of The Death of General Montgomery in the Attack on Quebec, December 31, 1775 John Trumbull, 1786

Meigs served in the local militia, achieving the rank of lieutenant in 1772 and promoted to captain in 1774. On April 19, 1775, after the Battle of Lexington, he led a company of light infantry to Boston. There he was appointed major in the 2nd Connecticut Regiment, a provincial regiment of the Continental Army. Later that year, serving as a division (battalion) commander under Colonel Benedict Arnold, he accompanied Arnold on his 1,100-man expedition through Maine to Canada. He kept a journal of the expedition, making the ink by mixing powder and water in the palm of his hand. Meigs was captured by the British in the assault on Quebec City and imprisoned; he was paroled on May 16, 1776, by British General Guy Carleton. He was acknowledged to have given decent treatment to a British prisoner, Captain Law, Carleton's chief engineer.

After Meigs was formally exchanged on January 10, 1777, he returned to active service as major of the 3rd Connecticut Regiment of the newly organized Connecticut Line. Meigs was appointed lieutenant colonel of Sherburne's Additional Continental Regiment on February 10, 1777. On May 12 he was sent to command the 6th Connecticut Regiment when its colonel, William Douglas, became incapacitated by ill health.

One of his most important achievements during the war was leading the Meigs Raid against the British forces in Sag Harbor, New York, in May 1777. With just 220 men in a fleet of 13 whaleboats, he crossed Long Island Sound from Connecticut to Long Island to attack British forces at night. The raid succeeded in burning 12 small boats and taking 90 prisoners without losing a single man. The U.S. Congress awarded Meigs a presentation sword for his heroism. After Colonel Douglas died on May 28, Connecticut Governor Jonathan Trumbull appointed Meigs as colonel of the 6th Connecticut.

When a corps of light infantry was formed under General Anthony Wayne in July 1779, Meigs was given command of its 3rd Regiment, which he led at the Battle of Stony Point. Following its disbandment in December, he returned to the 6th Connecticut and became acting commander of the 1st Connecticut Brigade. In that capacity, he put down an incipient mutiny and received the written thanks of General George Washington. In January 1781 the Continental Army was reorganized, and many of its regiments were consolidated. As a result, the Connecticut Line was reduced from eight to five regiments; four colonels, including Meigs, were retired.

== Northwest Territory ==
After the Revolutionary War, Meigs was appointed surveyor of the Ohio Company of Associates. In April 1788, at age 47, he was one of a party of pioneers to the Northwest Territory from New England. They reached the confluence of the Muskingum and Ohio rivers, where he participated in the founding of Marietta, Ohio. Meigs drafted the code of regulations used for governance until the formal creation of the Northwest Territory the following year.

Subsequently, he entered political life, being appointed as a territorial judge, a justice of the peace, and clerk of the Court of Quarter Sessions. In 1795, he served the army under General Anthony Wayne, as a commissary of clothing in the western country. In 1799, Meigs was elected as a member of the Ohio territorial legislature, serving until 1801.

== Indian agent ==
In 1801, President Thomas Jefferson appointed 60-year old Meigs to the combined position of US Indian agent to the Cherokee and military agent for the United States War Department. The government's trading or factory operations were linked with Indian relations in the War Department during these years.Initially Meigs' office and the Cherokee Agency were at Fort Southwest Point in what is now Kingston, Tennessee. In 1807 he relocated these operations to a new post further south, named Hiwassee Garrison. It was near the mouth of the Hiwassee River, at its confluence with the Tennessee River. Charles R. Hicks, a mixed-race (European and Cherokee) and bilingual Cherokee, worked as his interpreter for some time. Hicks later became a chief of the Cherokee. Meigs' role as military agent ended in 1813 when the Federal soldiers stationed at Hiwassee Garrison were withdrawn. He continued as Cherokee agent on the Hiwassee River until his death on January 28, 1823.

The job of an Indian agent was multi-faceted. He was to prevent wars between the Indian tribes and the United States, eliminate any influence by other countries over the Indians, foster agriculture and the "arts of civilization", distribute annuities granted tribes by treaties, regulate commerce between Indians and white traders, and prohibit whites from settling on Indian land. In exchange for these benefits, the Indians were to sell or cede excess land they owned to the United States. It was the issue of land that characterized Meig's tenure as agent to the Cherokees. During his 22 years as agent, Cherokee land cessions to the United States totalled 25,665 sq mi (66,470 km^{2}) leaving the Cherokee in possession of 12,316 sq mi (31,900 km^{2}) of land, mostly in northern Georgia.

The Cherokee at this time were divided by dissention, although the majority opposed land sales or cessions to the United States. Meigs worked with tribal leaders favorable to ceding land, providing them "special considerations" (bribes) for their cooperation. Meigs believed that the Cherokee should move west of the Mississippi River, as some were doing. In 1808, he said, "It is my opinion that there will never be quietness on any of these frontiers until the Indians are removed over the Mississippi." Removal across the Mississippi was envisioned by many as a permanent solution to the Indian problem. Thomas Jefferson believed that white settlement of the trans-Mississippi region would take 1,000 years. In reality, it was only two decades later, in 1828, before the Cherokee in Arkansas were surrounded by white settlers.

His promotion of Cherokee land cessions notwithstanding, Meigs was in some respects a competent and dedicated agent. He was diligent in attempting to have U.S. the government prosecute crimes, of which there were many, by whites against Cherokee and expelling squatters on Cherokee land. "Meigs endeavored honestly and fairly to support the rights of the Indians." In 1823, he died of pneumonia after giving his quarters to a visiting Cherokee chief and sleeping outside in a tent. Meigs is buried in the Garrison Cemetery in Rhea County, Tennessee, near the site of the former Hiwassee Garrison.

== Legacy ==
His son Return J. Meigs Jr. was elected as Ohio governor and later, by the legislature, as U.S. Senator. A grandson, Return J. Meigs IV, married Jennie Ross, daughter of principal Cherokee chief John Ross. They emigrated with her father to Indian Territory in 1838, forced out on the Trail of Tears.

Two Tennessee place names honor Meigs: Meigs County, which was formed in 1836 from part of Rhea County, and Meigs Mountain in the Great Smoky Mountains.
