= Samuel Wyllys =

12th Secretary of the State of Connecticut
- In office 1796–1809
- Governor: Oliver Wolcott; Jonathan Trumbull Jr.
- Preceded by: George Wyllys
- Succeeded by: Thomas Day

Personal details
- Born: January 4, 1739 Hartford, Connecticut
- Died: June 9, 1823 (aged 84) Hartford, Connecticut
- Parent: George Wyllys (father)
- Education: Yale College

Samuel Wyllys (January 4, 1739 – June 9, 1823) was an American military officer in the American Revolution, Connecticut politician, and a member of the Wyllys–Haynes family.

== Early life ==
Wyllys was born on January 4, 1739, and baptized on January 7, 1739. He graduated from Yale College in 1758. In 1764, Wyllys sailed to England and remained there for six years.

== Military career ==
In October 1771, Wyllys led the successful petition to the Connecticut General Assembly to create the Governor's Guard. Wyllys was then elected as the unit's first captain.

In 1775, he was appointed lieutenant colonel in Colonel Joseph Spencer's 2nd Connecticut Regiment. on July 1, he was promoted to Colonel, and commanded the regiment until January 1, 1776, when the 2nd Connecticut was reorganized as the 22nd Continental Regiment. Wyllys remained in command of the regiment, serving in the Siege of Boston until the British evacuation on March 17, and then marched with George Washington to New York. He saw action in the Battle of Long Island and served in the New York vicinity until the end of the year.

From 1777 to 1781, Colonel Wyllys commanded the 3rd Connecticut Regiment in the Connecticut Line, serving under General Samuel Holden Parsons. His regiment served in the New York area throughout the remainder of its service.

Wyllys was discharged from the Army, along with his regiment, on January 1, 1781. He later served as a Major General of the Connecticut Militia from 1793 to 1796.

== Political career ==
Following the war, Wyllys served as a representative in the Connecticut General Assembly and town clerk of Hartford. Wyllys also succeeded his father, George Wyllys, as the Secretary of the State of Connecticut, serving from 1796 to 1809. He was the third consecutive member of the Wyllys family to hold the office, as his father had succeeded his grandfather Hezekiah Wyllys in 1735. Wyllys resigned his position as a result of some kind of paralytic affliction.

== Personal life ==
On February 3, 1777, Wyllys married his first cousin, Ruth Belden. Ruth died on September 11, 1807.

== Death ==
Wyllys died on June 9, 1823, and was buried in Hartford's Ancient Burying Ground. Wyllys's funeral procession included members of the First Company Governor's Foot Guard, of which he had served as the first commanding officer. Like all members of the Wyllys family buried in the Ancient Burying Ground, Wyllys's grave is unmarked because "if Connecticut could not remember the Wyllyses without monuments, their memory might rot."

Political offices
Preceded by George Wyllys	Secretary of the State of Connecticut; 1796–1810	Succeeded by Thomas Day
