= LGBTQ historic places in the United States =

The following is a list of LGBT historic places in the United States. It includes sites that are recognized at the federal, state, county, or municipal level as important to the history of the LGBT civil rights movement. They represent the achievements and struggles of the community and provide context to understand these events and people. The National Park Service is amid an effort to chronicle LGBT sites across the nation, and have identified almost 400 of interest.

== Historic sites ==
Name	Image	City	State	Designation	Level of designation	Date first designated	Description	Ref
Alice Austen House aka Clear Comfort		Staten Island	New York	NRHP; NHL; NYCL	Federal	August 2, 1967	Birthplace of photographer Alice Austen (1866-1952) and later of her partner Gertrude Tate	
Carrington House	—	Cherry Grove	New York	NRHP	Federal	January 8, 2014	Oldest house in the gay town of Cherry Grove; where Truman Capote wrote Breakfast at Tiffany's	
The Castro Camera and the Harvey Milk Residence	—	San Francisco	California	SFDL	Local	July 2, 2000	Home and studio of Harvey Milk, the first openly gay person to win an election. Lenient sentencing following his assassination in 1978 led to the White Night riots.	
Charlton–King–Vandam Historic District		New York City	New York	NRHP; HD; NYCL	Federal	August 16, 1966	The John V. Gridley House, 37 Charlton Street, was Marianne Moore's childhood home	
Cherry Grove Community House and Theatre	—	Cherry Grove	New York	NRHP	Federal	June 4, 2013	Oldest continually-operating gay summer theater	
Cinema Follies	-	Washington	District of Columbia	HABS	Federal	-	37 L St. SE, Washington, DC, was the Cinema Follies, adult film theater for gay men	
The Clubhouse	-	Washington	District of Columbia	HABS	Federal	-	1296 Upshur St. NW, Washington, DC, was the Clubhouse of the Metropolitan Capitolites, a social club for African American LGBTQ Washingtonians	
Earl Hall at Columbia University		New York City	New York	NRHP	Federal	March 14, 2018	The Student Homophile League was the first gay student organization in the US, founded at Columbia University in 1966.	
Edificio Comunidad de Orgullo Gay de Puerto Rico		Pueblo	Puerto Rico	NRHP	Federal	May 2, 2016	Founded in 1974, also known as "Casa Orgulllo", meeting place for the first LGBT organization in Puerto Rico	
Elks Athletic Club		Louisville	Kentucky	NRHP	Federal	July 16, 1979	The Beaux Arts Cocktail Lounge was a club for gay men from 1947 to 1955	
Federal Building		San Francisco	California	HD	Federal	June 5, 2017	In 1985 a protest took place at this location with AIDS activists chaining themselves to the door of the building, asking for an increase in funding for AIDS-related research, social services, and medical care	
The Furies Collective		Washington	District of Columbia	NRHP	Federal	February 5, 2016	House of the Furies Collective, a lesbian feminist separatist collective active from 1971 to 1973	
Henry Gerber House		Chicago	Illinois	CL; NRHP; NHL	Local	June 6, 2001	Apartment of Henry Gerber, who founded the first gay rights organization.	
Barbara Gittings Way	-	Philadelphia	Pennsylvania	-	-	October 1, 2012	A section of Locust Street, Philadelphia, is named "Barbara Gittings Way" in Gittings' memory. Gittings' house was at 236 S 21st Street.	
Great Wall of Los Angeles	-	Los Angeles	California	NRHP	Federal	September 18, 2017	Represented themes are also gay and lesbian rights	
Harleigh Cemetery, Camden		Camden	New Jersey	NJRHP	Local	1995	Burial place of Walt Whitman	
Hull House		Chicago	Illinois	NRHP; NHL; CL	Federal	June 23, 1965	Settlement house co-founded by Jane Addams and Ellen Gates Starr	
Julius' Bar		New York City	New York	NRHP	Federal	April 20, 2016	Julius’ Bar is the oldest gay bar in New York City and one of the oldest bars in the city in continuous operation	
Dr. Franklin E. Kameny Residence		Washington	District of Columbia	NRHP	Federal	November 2, 2011	Home of gay rights activist Frank Kameny	
James Merrill House		Stonington	Connecticut	NRHP; NHL	Federal	August 28, 2013	Home of poet James Merrill and his partner David Noyes Jackson	
Pauli Murray Family Home		Durham	North Carolina	NRHP; NHL	Federal	December 23, 2016	Home of civil rights advocate Pauli Murray	
Nob Hill	-	Washington	District of Columbia	HABS	Federal	-	1101 Kenyon St. NW, Washington, DC, was the Nob Hill, a bar for African American gay men	
Bayard Rustin Residence		New York City	New York	NRHP	Federal	August 3, 2016	In 1962, Bayard Rustin (1912-1987) bought apartment 9J in Building 7 of the Penn South Complex, West Chelsea, Manhattan	
Phase One		Washington	District of Columbia	HABS	Federal	-	525 8th St. SE, Washington, DC, was the Phase 1, a bar for lesbian women	
Pier 9 Bar	-	Washington	District of Columbia	HABS	Federal	-	1824 Half St., SW, Washington, DC, was the Pier 9 Bar, a disco for gay men	
Stonewall Inn		New York City	New York	NRHP; NHL; NM	Federal	June 28, 1999	Site of the Stonewall riots of 1969. First recognized National Historic Landmark and National Monument.	
Sunny Slope Cemetery	-	Saunemin	Illinois	-	-	-	Jennie Hodgers, woman soldier who served in Union army, is buried at Sunny Slope Cemetery	
Trinity Episcopal Church	-	St. Louis	Missouri	NRHP	-	2020	Episcopal church that hosted the first LGBT advocacy group in Missouri	
Walt Whitman House		Camden	New Jersey	NRHP; NHL	Federal	October 15, 1966	House of Walt Whitman from 1884 till death	
Whiskey Row Historic District		Louisville	Kentucky	NRHP; HD	Federal	June 4, 2010	105 West Main Street was The Downtowner, a gay bar, from 1975 to 1989	
Williams Building	—	San Francisco	California	-	-	-	The Williams Building, 689-93 Mission St, was the national headquarters of the Mattachine Society and Daughters of Bilitis	
The Women's Building		San Francisco	California	SFDL	Local	-	The Women's Building was founded in 1971 among others, by San Francisco lesbian leader Roma Guy, featured in the ABC mini-series "When We Rise".	
