= Water Island =

Water Island may refer to:

- Water Island, New York, a hamlet in Suffolk County, on Fire Island
- Water Island, U.S. Virgin Islands, island in the Caribbean
- Water Island, an island in the video game My Singing Monsters
