= Carrington House =

- U.S. National Register of Historic Places
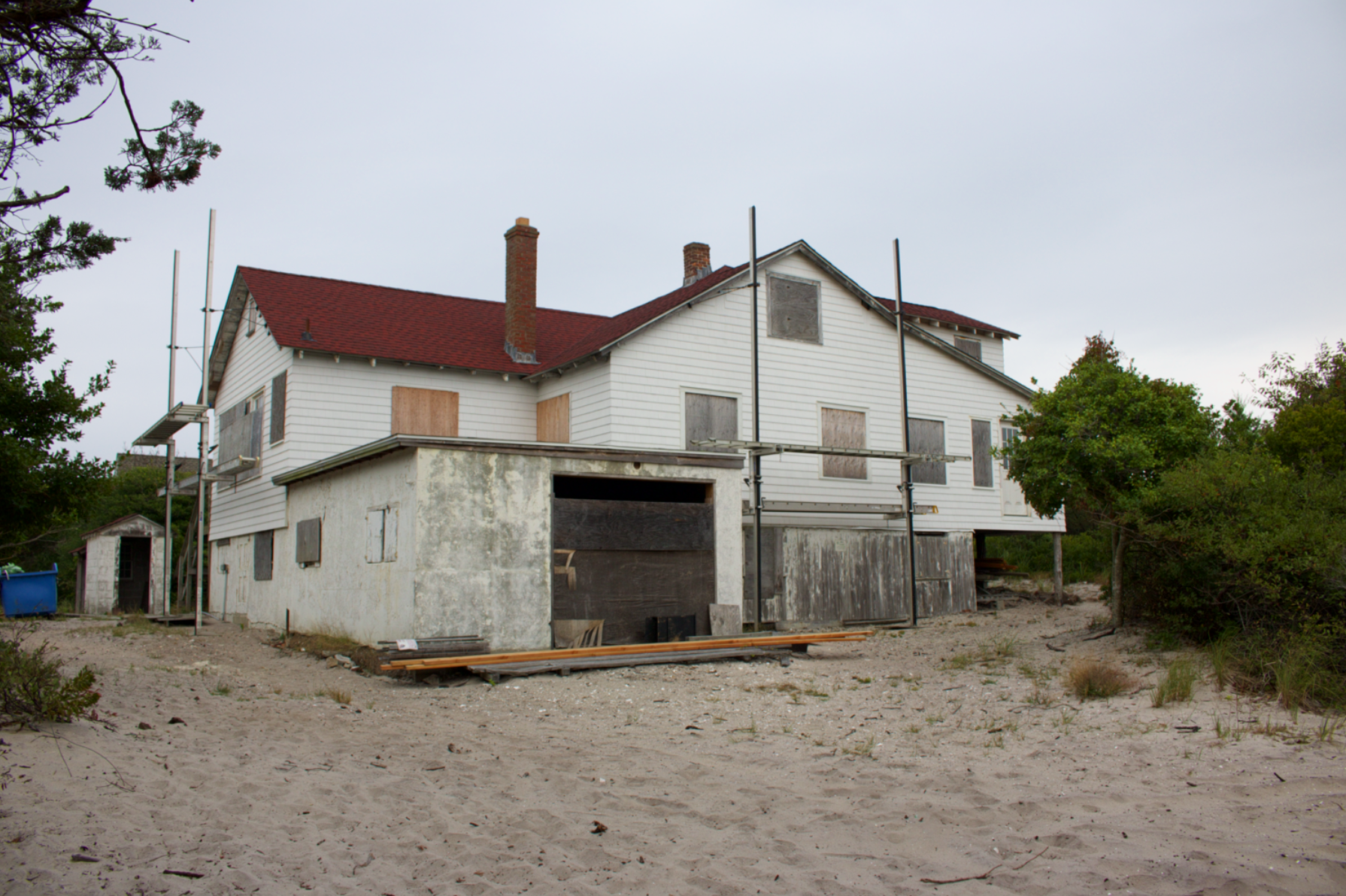

- Location within New York Location within the United States
- Location: Lewis Walk, Cherry Grove, New York
- Coordinates: 40°39′43″N 73°04′39″W
- Built: c. 1912
- Architectural style: Bungalow
- NRHP reference No.: 13001057
- Added to NRHP: January 8, 2014

The Carrington House is a bungalow located in the hamlet of Cherry Grove, New York. Built around 1912, it was one of the first buildings in Cherry Grove and constructed for Frederick Marquet. It is typical of early buildings on Fire Island. It was acquired by theater director Frank Carrington in 1927, who enlarged the house. Under his ownership, the house was a popular refuge for LGBT artists like Truman Capote; Breakfast at Tiffany's was written there.

== History ==
Fire Island is a barrier island off the southern shore of Long Island in New York. In 1869, the Long Island Rail Road expanded to Patchogue, across the bay from Fire Island. The first settlement on the island was Cherry Grove. Ferries were built to accommodate visitors, and by the early twentieth century, Fire Island hosted several resorts. Middle-class families built small vacation cottages like the Carrington House. In the 1920s, Fire Island became a popular destination for the gay population of New York City. The isolation of the island made it an ideal retreat to escape the crowds of the city.

Frank Carrington was born in 1894 and had been interested in the theater from a young age. He became a theater director and co-founded the Cherry Lane Theatre in New York City. He began his greatest work, the creation of Millburn's Paper Mill Playhouse, in 1934. In 1927, he purchased this cottage on Fire Island from Frederick Marquet, a fellow resident of Millburn, New Jersey. At the time, the cottage was a rectangular, three bay bungalow. Carrington made two wood-frame additions around 1940. In the 1940s, he allegedly purchased two outbuildings from a nearby Lifesaving Station and added them to the property.

Carrington was active in the growing arts community of Cherry Grove. He rented the property to his friends in the community, including Truman Capote. In 1957, Capote developed a novella there that would become Breakfast at Tiffany's. Other guests included New York City Ballet co-founder Lincoln Kerstein, fashion designer Bill Blass, actor Henry Fonda, actress Gertrude Lawrence, and actress Katharine Hepburn.

Carrington owned the house for almost fifty years, then sold it to the US government as part of Fire Island National Seashore under the condition that he be able to live there for the rest of his life; he died on July 3, 1975. National Park Service Ranger Bob Freda lived there for the next twenty years. The Carrington House is probably the oldest surviving building in Cherry Grove. It was recognized with a listing on the National Register of Historic Places on January 8, 2014. It is one of five sites so recognized due for its role in LBGT history, although almost 400 other candidates have been identified.

== See also ==
- Cherry Grove Community House and Theatre
