= Invasion of the Pines =

Annual event at Fire Island Pines, New York, United States

Coordinates: 40.6595°N 73.0900°W

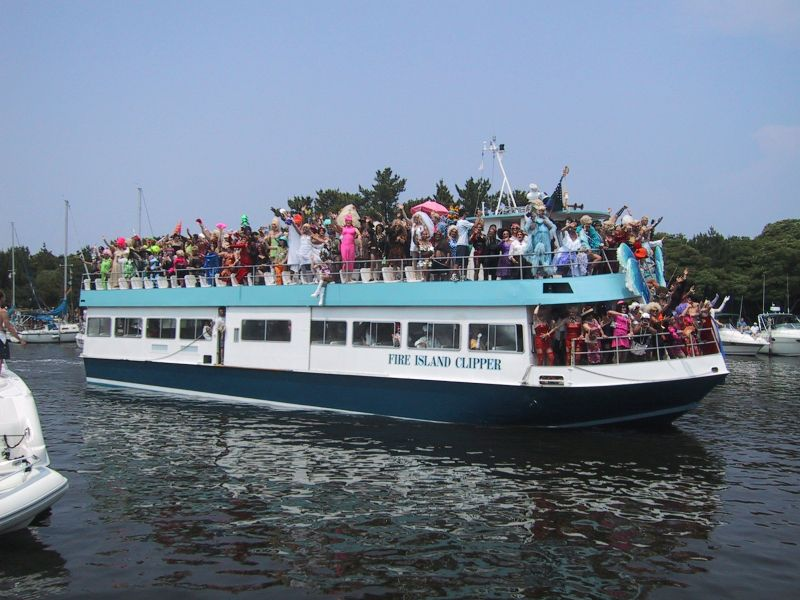
The ferry arrives at the Fire Island Pines Harbor

The Invasion of the Pines is an annual event on the Fourth of July in Fire Island Pines, New York. The Invasion of the Pines attracts hundreds of drag queens and thousands of spectators.

== History ==
During the summer of 1976, a restaurant in Fire Island Pines, New York, denied entry to a visitor in drag named Terry Warren. Fire Island Pines is a beach community on Fire Island east of New York City with a gay majority population that was at the time more affluent and conservative than the population of nearby Cherry Grove. When Warren's friends in Cherry Grove heard what had happened, they too dressed up in drag, and, on July 4, 1976, with Cherry Grove's 1976 Homecoming Queen Thom Hansen (a.k.a. Panzi) in the lead, sailed to the Pines by water taxi. The boatload of drag queens that stormed into the Pines that day—to a surprised but exuberant welcome—was the first "invasion," an event now repeated each year.

== Current annual event ==
Now, many years later, the annual Fourth of July Invasion of the Pines attracts hundreds of drag queens and thousands of spectators to what has become an annual Independence Day event.

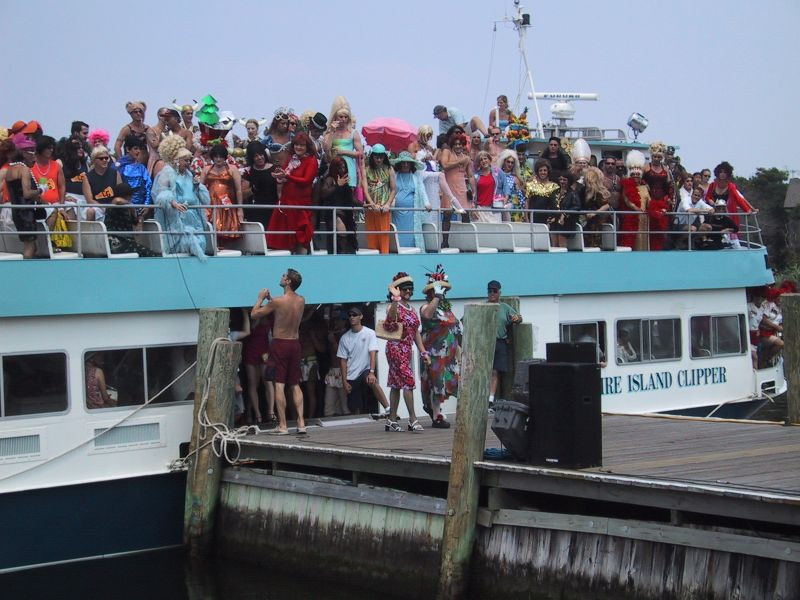
The queens arrive at the Fire Island Pines Harbor

On the afternoon of July 4 each year, drag queens from both Cherry Grove and the Pines gather at the Ice Palace Bar at the Cherry Grove Hotel in Cherry Grove; after parading through the street of Cherry Grove, they board a chartered ferry boat and sail to the Pines Harbor, where they are greeted by thousands of cheering residents and visitors. As each drag queen leaves the ferry and marches onto the dock, she is announced by Panzi, the original 1976 invasion leader, now mistress of ceremonies.

Jon Morrow, a film maker and gynecologist from New York City, produced a short documentary film titled Invasion of the Pines on the annual celebrations.

== Sources and external links ==
- Gay Travel Guide For Fire Island Pines and Cherry Grove
- Fire Island Invasion: history and photos
- Fire Island Men: Gay Men of Cherry Grove and Fire Island Pines
- Fire Island Q News: "Tales of the Beach: A Historical Review"
- "Invasion of the Pines": a documentary film by Jon Morrow
