= Cherry Grove Community House and Theatre =

Historic place in New York, US

- U.S. National Register of Historic Places
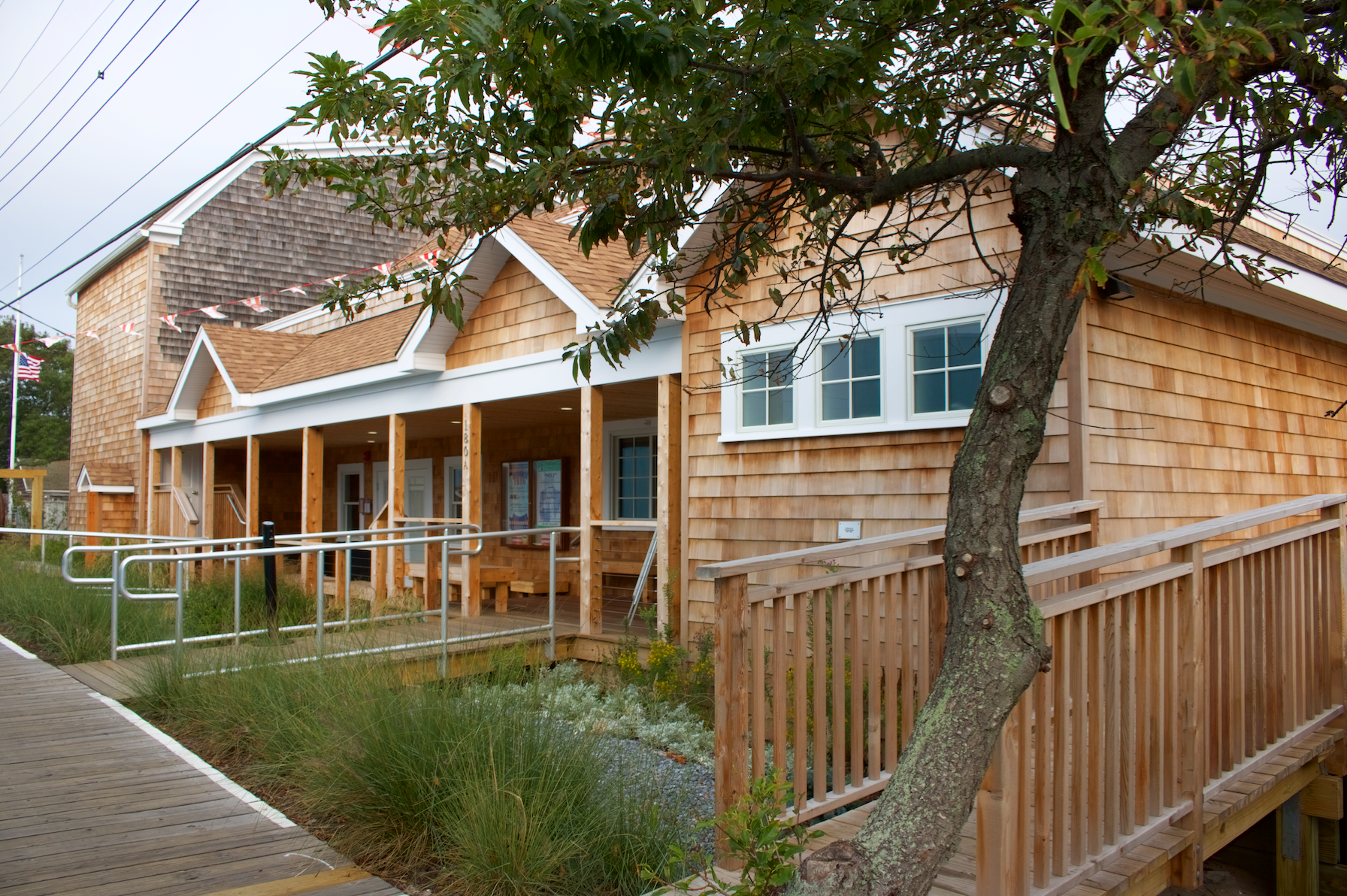

- Location within New York Location within the United States
- Location: 180 Bayview Walk, Cherry Grove, New York
- Coordinates: 40°39′36″N 73°05′26″W
- Built: 1947
- NRHP reference No.: 13000373
- Added to NRHP: June 4, 2013

The Cherry Grove Community House and Theatre is a historic building in Cherry Grove, New York. It played an important part in the development of Cherry Grove as an LGBT town.

== History ==
Fire Island is a barrier island off the southern shore of Long Island in New York state. In 1869, the Long Island Rail Road expanded to nearby Patchogue, initiating settlement on Fire Island. Ferries were built to accommodate visitors, and by the early nineteenth century, Fire Island hosted several resorts, including Cherry Grove. By the late 1920s, the island was a popular and welcoming destination for the LGBT community.

Cherry Grove formed a homeowners' association as a de facto government of the unincorporated community. In 1944, this group met at Duffy's Hotel to become the Cherry Grove Property Owners Association, which featured committees on finance, art, the beach, and fire prevention. At a meeting of this group on September 29, 1945, members agreed to a plan to purchase a carriage house to convert to a community house. Following renovations, a meeting on January 25, 1946 established a board of directors, including association president Earl Blackwell. The community house was used for municipal government, including elections. It also hosted social activities, such as religious functions and fairs. Residents donated goods for use in the building.

At a September 1948 board meeting, the Property Owners Association founded an "Artistic Activity Group." This group held theatrical performances at the community house; at the time, live theater was otherwise absent from the island. Saturday night shows became regular to meet demand. Veteran theater performers and directors such as Frank Carrington (founder of the Paper Mill Playhouse), Cheryl Crawford (co-founded the Actors Studio), and novelist Carson McCullers provided creative direction. Broadway and Hollywood actors and actresses such as Peggy Fears, Nancy Walker, and Betty Garde performed at the shows. Another fundraiser in 1948 financed a large addition to the theater. The theater provided a creative haven for the homosexual residents of Cherry Grove and their guests, where productions would openly address homosexual community issues.

The Cherry Grove Theatre is the oldest continually operating gay summer theater in the United States. It was recognized by the National Park Service with a listing on the National Register of Historic Places on June 4, 2013. It is one of only five sites listed because of its association with LGBT history. However, almost 400 other such sites have been identified as candidates.

== See also ==
- Carrington House
