= Davis Park, New York =

Davis Park
- Hamlet
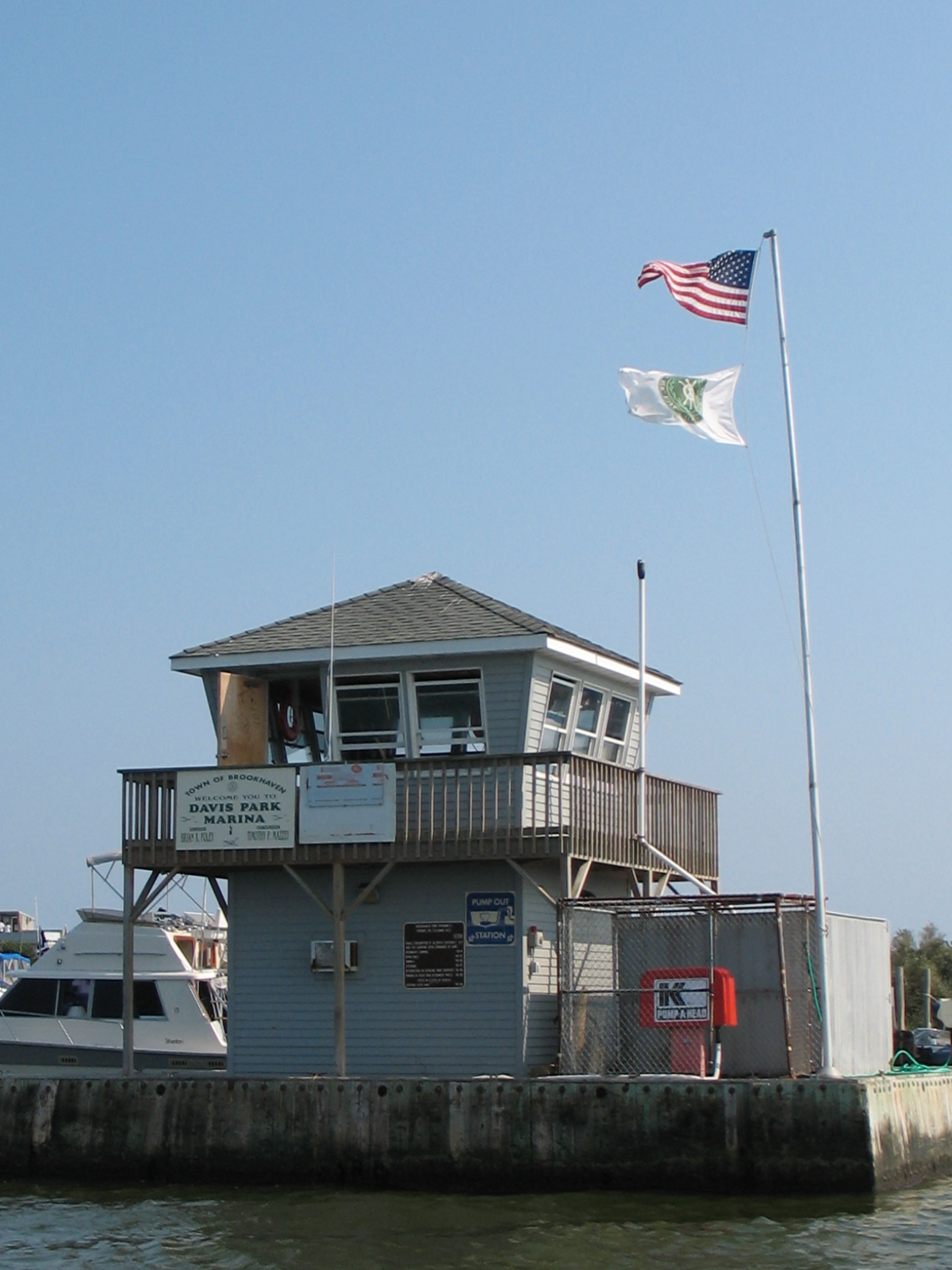
- Davis Park Dockmaster Tower, Ferry Port and Marina

- Location in the United States Location in New York
- Coordinates: 40°41′02″N 73°00′19″W
- Country: United States
- State: New York
- County: Suffolk
- Time zone: UTC−05:00 (Eastern Time Zone)
  - Summer (DST): UTC−04:00
- ZIP Code: 11772
- Area codes: 631, 934
- GNIS feature ID: 948069

Davis Park is a hamlet in the Town of Brookhaven, Suffolk County, New York, United States. It is located on Fire Island, a barrier island separated from the southern side of Long Island by the Great South Bay off the South Shore village of Patchogue. It lies within the Fire Island National Seashore.

Davis Park is a Fire Island beach community which acts as a destination for families and singles alike, who are home owners, renters, boaters, and ferry goers.

Davis Park is commonly used to refer to three contiguous areas in the hamlet of Davis Park, namely, Davis Park, Leja Beach, and Ocean Ridge. The three areas share services and social life, and are separated from other communities on Fire Island.

Technically, Davis Park refers to the business and public part of the community on both sides of Trustees' Walk, in contrast to the sections known as Leja Beach (to the west of Trustees Walk bounding Center Walk to the North and South) and Ocean Ridge (to the east).

Davis Park is the easternmost private community on Fire Island (formerly, there were other communities to the east that were removed by the National Park Service after the creation of Fire Island National Seashore in 1964, they included Bayberry Dunes, Whalehouse Point and Long Cove).

The community extends along approximately3/4 mile (1.2 km) of beachfront, and is approximately 330 yards (0.30 km) wide at its widest and 190 yards (0.17 km) wide at its narrowest point (dune to bay, excluding ocean beach width). Davis Park is bordered by extensive wilderness areas to both east and west. The Watch Hill facility of the National Park Service (with a small marina, restaurant, campground, nature trail and seasonal tours and activities) is approximately 1/2 mile (0.80 km) east, and Water Island (a community, not a separate island) is approximately one mile (1.6 km) to the west. Davis Park lies approximately 13.9 miles (22.4 km) from the eastern end of Fire Island at Moriches Inlet and 16.3 miles (26.2 km) from the western end of Fire Island at Democrat Point (in Robert Moses State Park).

The United States Post Office at Davis Park (open July and August only) lies at approximately 40°41′04″N 73°00′15″W.

Location of Davis Park on Long Island

To reach Davis Park, one must travel by boat. A ferry (seasonal, mid-March to end of November) is available which departs from Sandspit Park in Patchogue on the mainland of Long Island and travels approximately for 15–20 minutes across the Great South Bay.

Davis Park has approximately 350 homes (130 in Ocean Ridge and 220 in Davis Park), one general store and grill, one restaurant and one bar. The restaurant and bar are the only ones on Fire Island with a clear view of the bay and the ocean. There is one unpaved road, commonly called the Burma Road, and wooden boardwalks. There are no cars (except for emergency, utility and construction vehicles and a very limited number of private vehicles, which are only allowed through a strict permit process regulated by the National Park Service). There are no street lights except in the marina area, resulting in fine night time star-gazing. There are a Brookhaven town public marina, a (seasonally) lifeguarded section of beach and public restrooms and showers.

Davis Park is protected by the all-volunteer Davis Park Fire Department and by Suffolk County Police. The non-for-profit Davis Park Medical Association owns a house, "Bedside Manor," on the dune in Ocean Ridge, which is rented in season to doctors and nurse practitioners at a below-market rate in exchange for their agreement to provide basic medical services through scheduled office hours and on-call availability. Bedside Manor is equipped with basic medical equipment and supplies. A helipad provides emergency evacuation capability.

== History ==
The origins of Davis Park can be tracked back to the 1940s. It all started with Mr. Davis of Blue Point who owned a tract of land of Fire Island. When he died he left some of the land to his sons. One of those sons sold his share of the land to four friends (Lee Coffin, Ed Sembler, Joe Gerard, and Al Brown) who would later go on to build the Davis Park Casino. The first letters of their first names were used to create the name of LEJA Beach.

== 2009 Beach Renourishment ==
In the winter and spring of 2009, a beach renourishment project was undertaken on Fire Island, with the cooperation of the National Park Service, the U.S. Army Corps of Engineers, the towns of Brookhaven and Islip and Fire Island residents. The renourishment program involved dredging sand from an offshore borrow area, pumping it onto the beach and shaping the sand into an approved beach face and dune template in front of the communities of Davis Park, Corneille Estates, Dunewood, Fair Harbor, Fire Island Pines, Fire Island Summer Club, Lonelyville, Ocean Bay Park, Ocean Beach, Saltaire, and Seaview. Fire Islanders agreed to a significant property tax increase to help pay for the project, which was estimated to cost between $23 and $25 million, including the cost of environmental monitoring, and was expected to add 1.8 million cubic yards of sand in front of the participating communities. The towns of Brookhaven and Islip, in which the communities are located, issued bonds to pay for the project, backed by the new taxes levied by community Erosion Control Taxing Districts. Fire Island has been named by the American Shore and Beach Preservation Association a winner of its 2009 Best Restored Beach award.

In November 2009, the remnants of Hurricane Ida, by then nicknamed the "nor' Ida," did substantial damage to the beachfront in Davis Park, carrying away much of the sand of the previous spring's beach renourishment project. New York Governor David A. Paterson asked President Barack Obama to declare a major federal disaster for the counties of Nassau, Queens and Suffolk (including Fire Island) for the severe erosion and damage to the protective barrier beaches.

== Tourism ==
Like all Fire Island hamlets, Davis Park's main attraction is its beach, and the idyllic nature of a boardwalk based waterfront community which is surrounded by vegetation and wildlife, and undisturbed by cars.

There is a single store named “The Harbor Store” near the Davis Park marina. It consists of a general market, a grill and ice cream stand, as well as a wine store.

- On the oceanside of Davis Park there is a restaurant known as the "Casino Cafe" which is one of the few oceanfront restaurants on the entire island. It has two distinctly separate areas, one area provides sit down dining, and a second area which serves as a bar with food services and music entertainment.

There are public bathrooms and showers available near the marina and ferry dock.

There used to be a baseball field, but a helipad was built on top of it a few years ago.

Davis Park has one of the largest marinas on Fire Island; it can hold up to 250 boats.

== See also ==
- Outer Barrier
- Robert Moses State Park
- Watch Hill
- Patchogue Bay

== Photo gallery ==
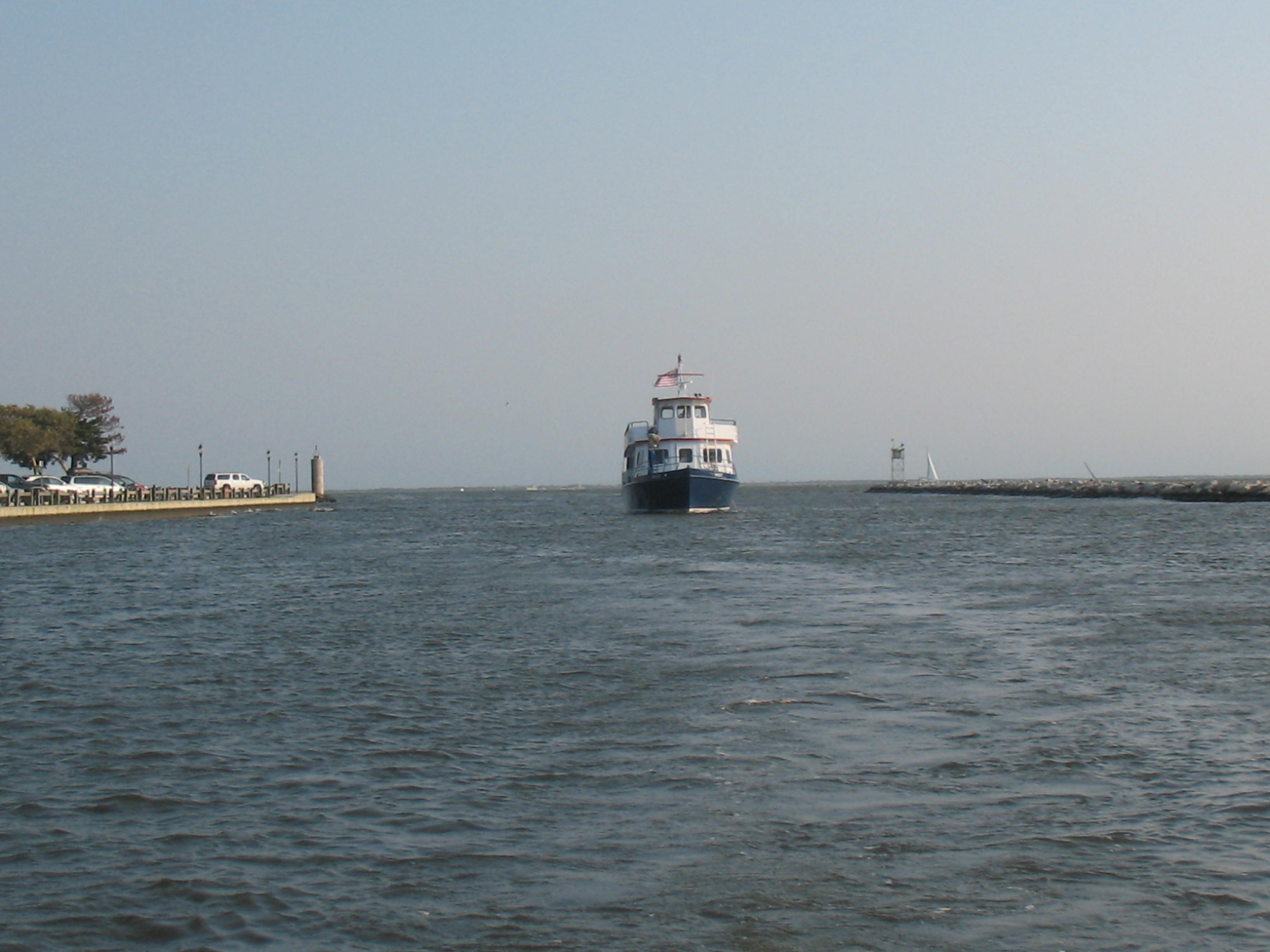

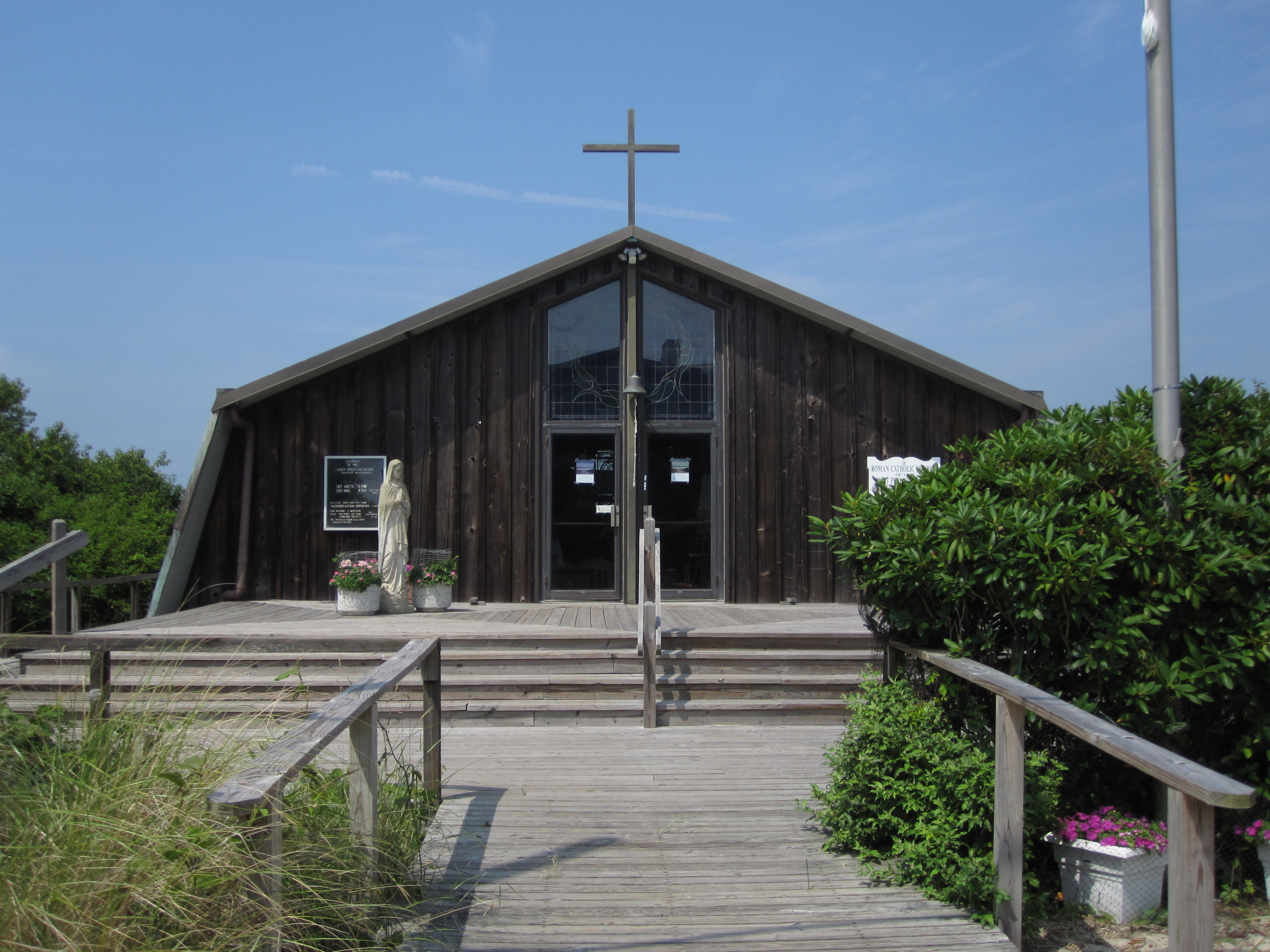

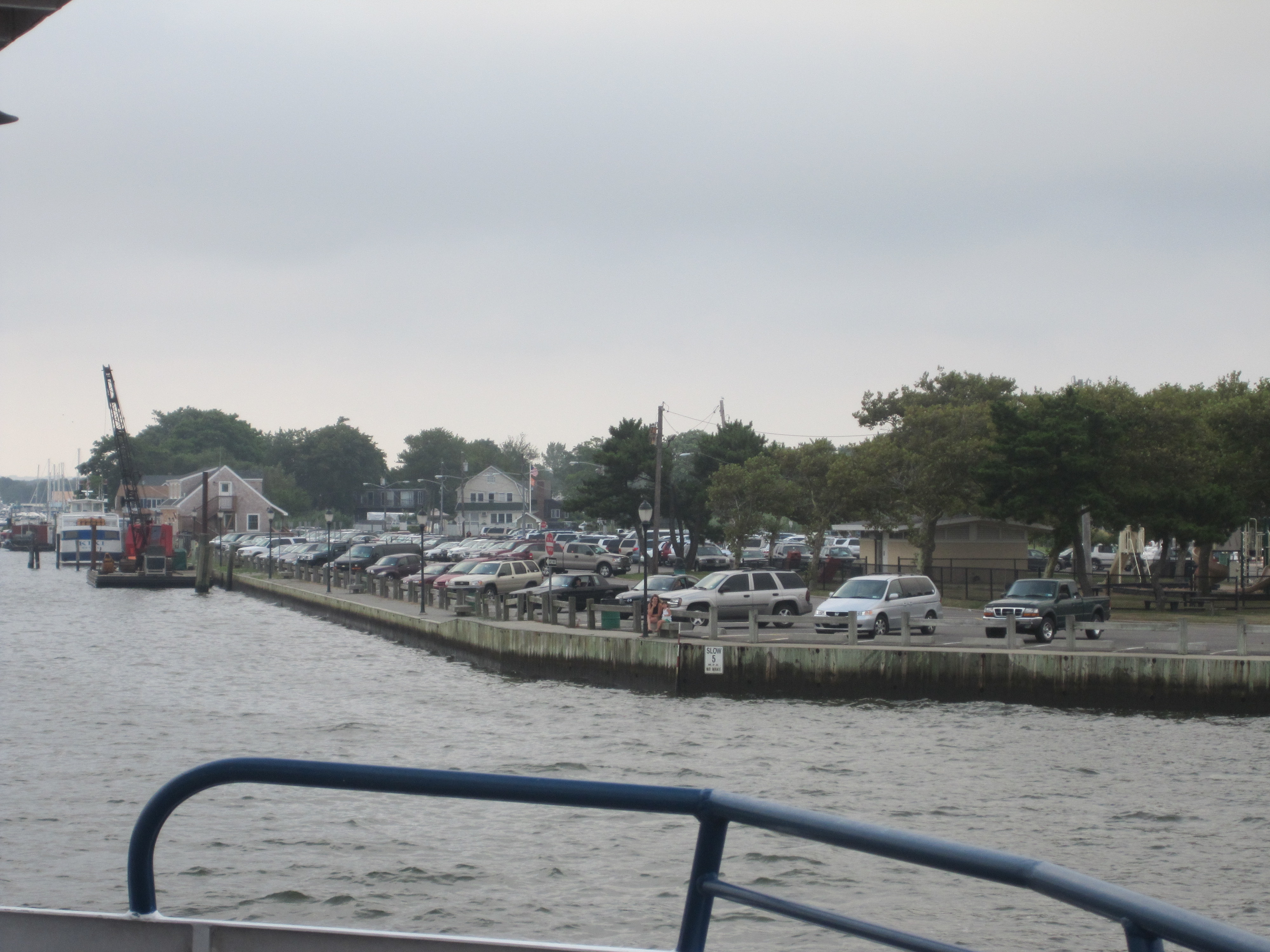

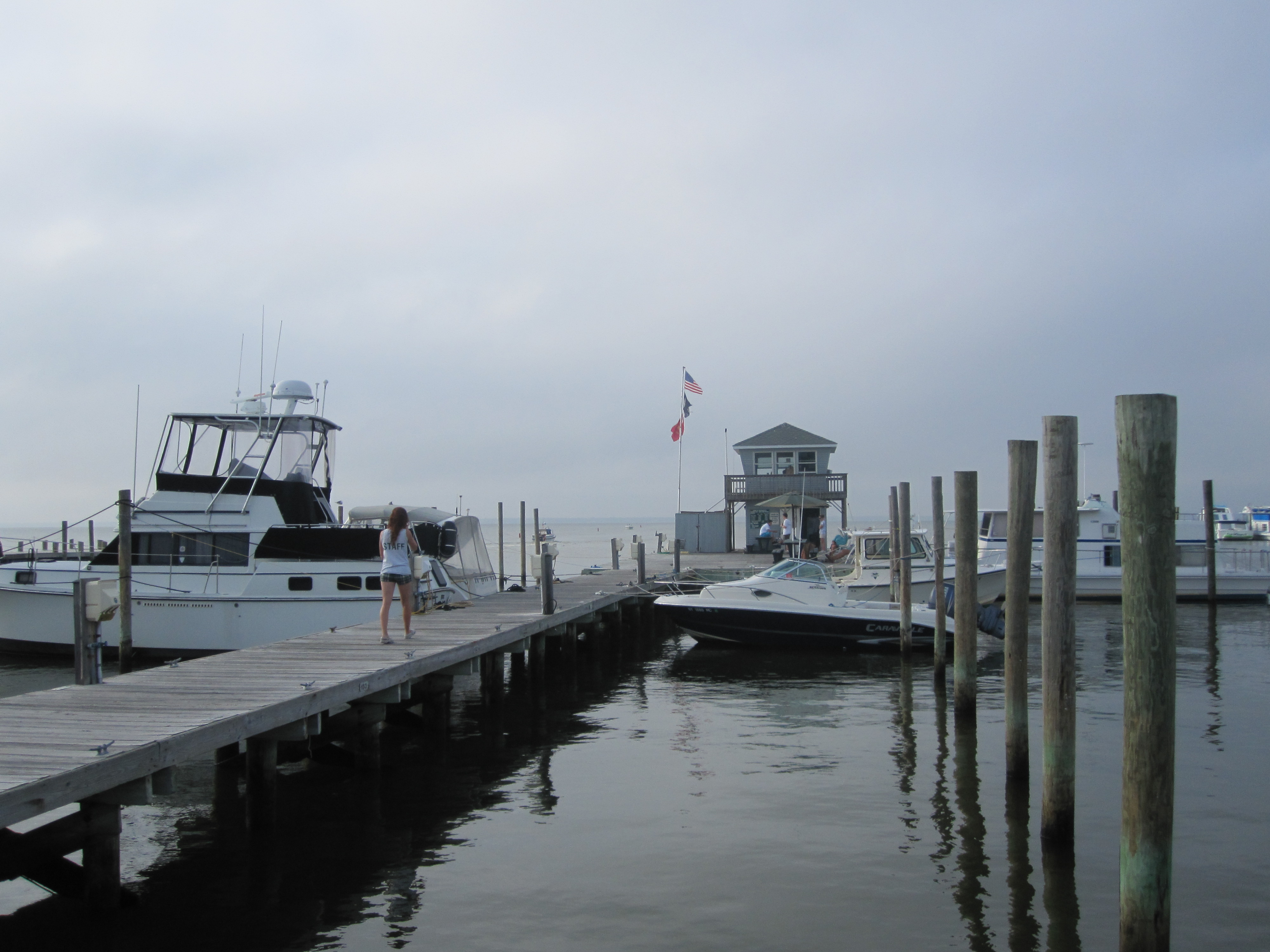

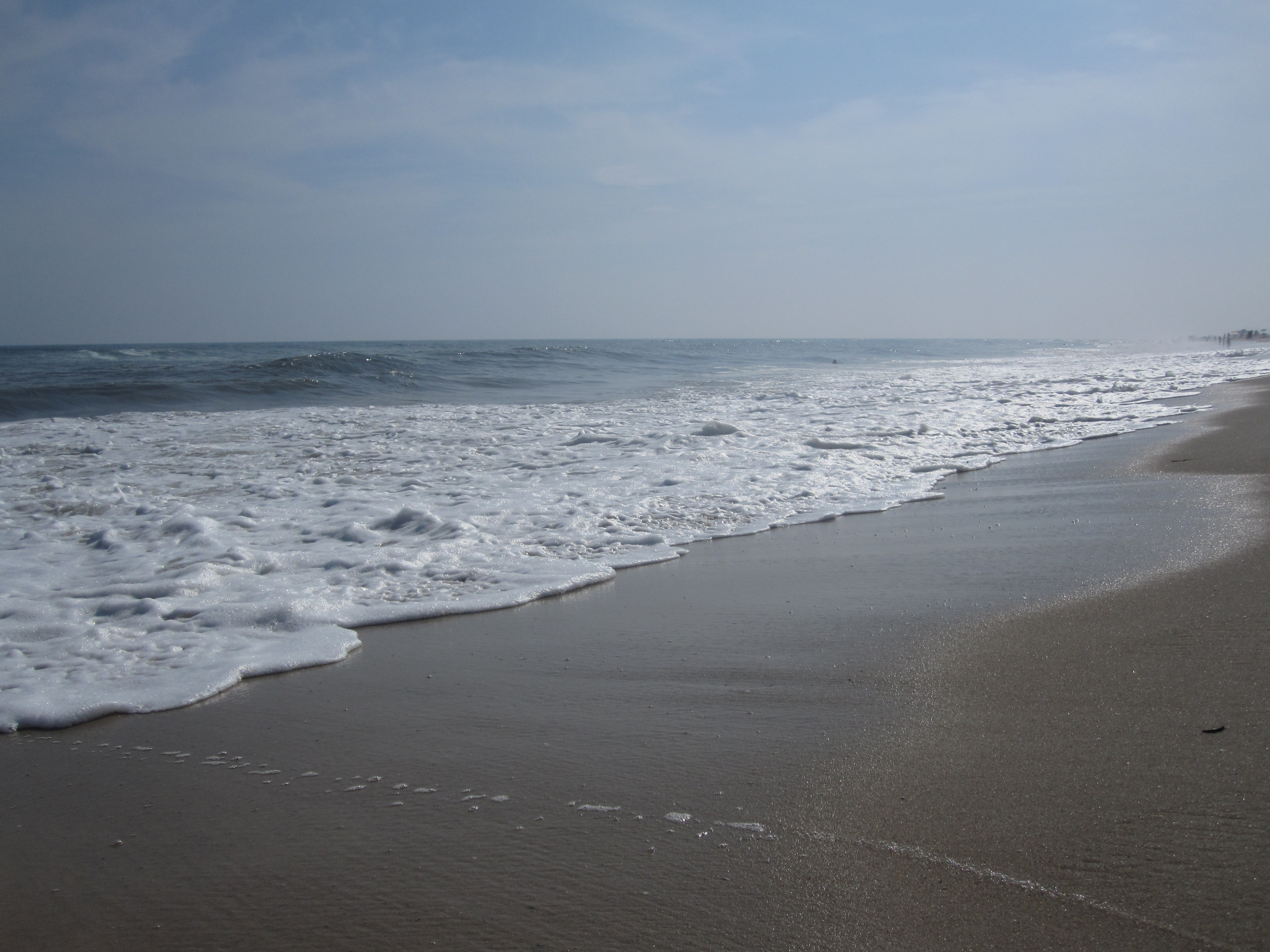

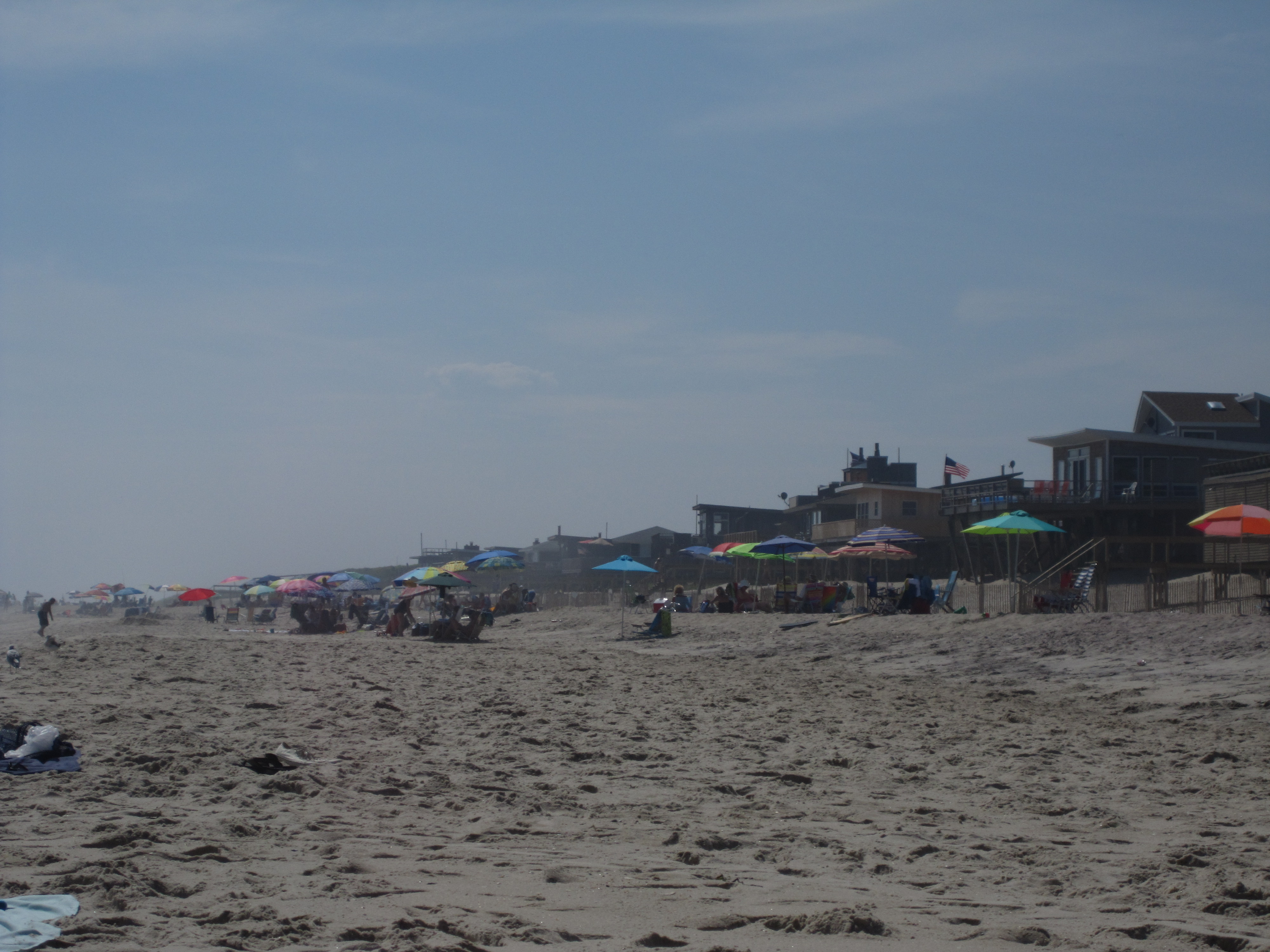

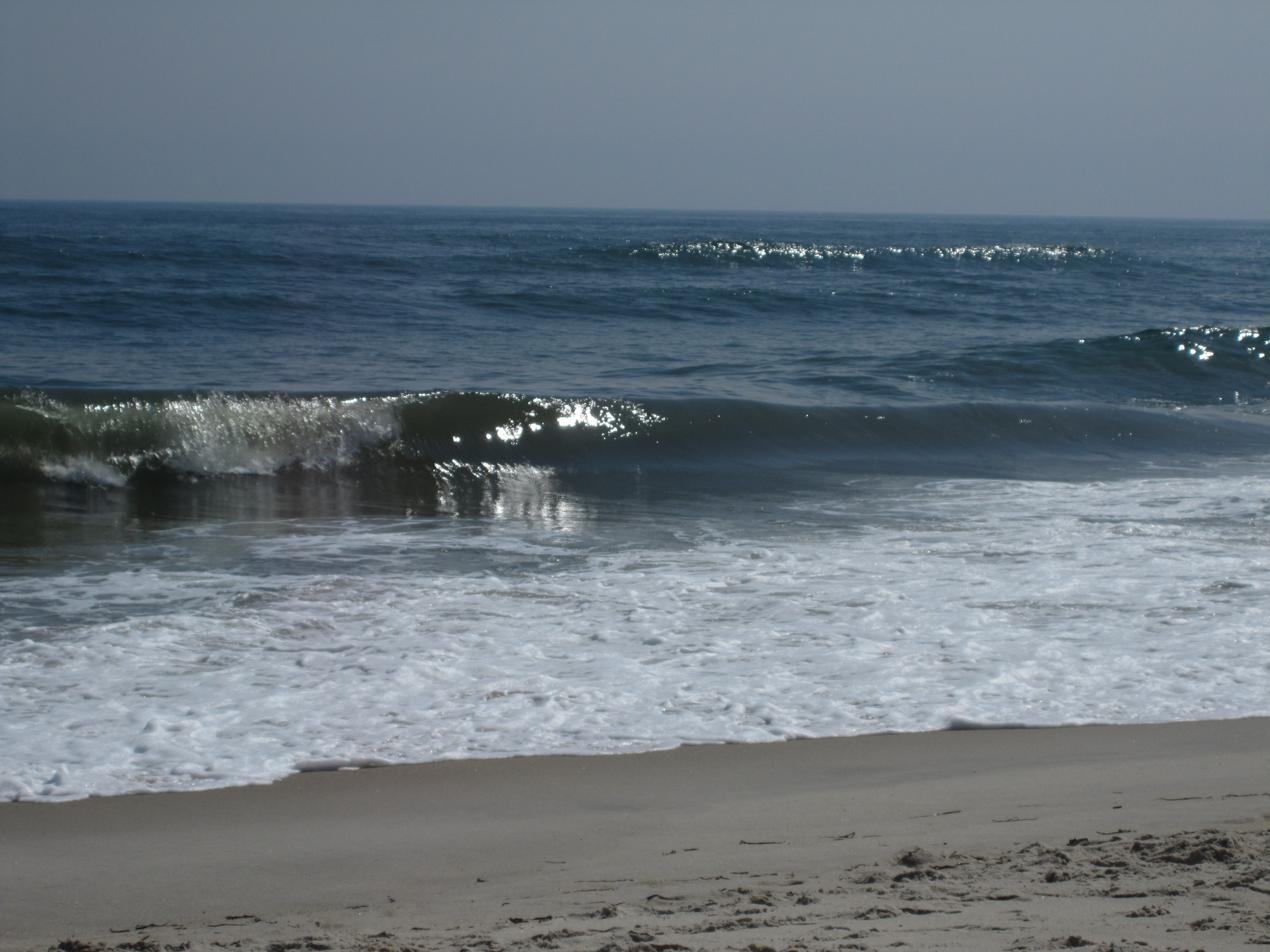

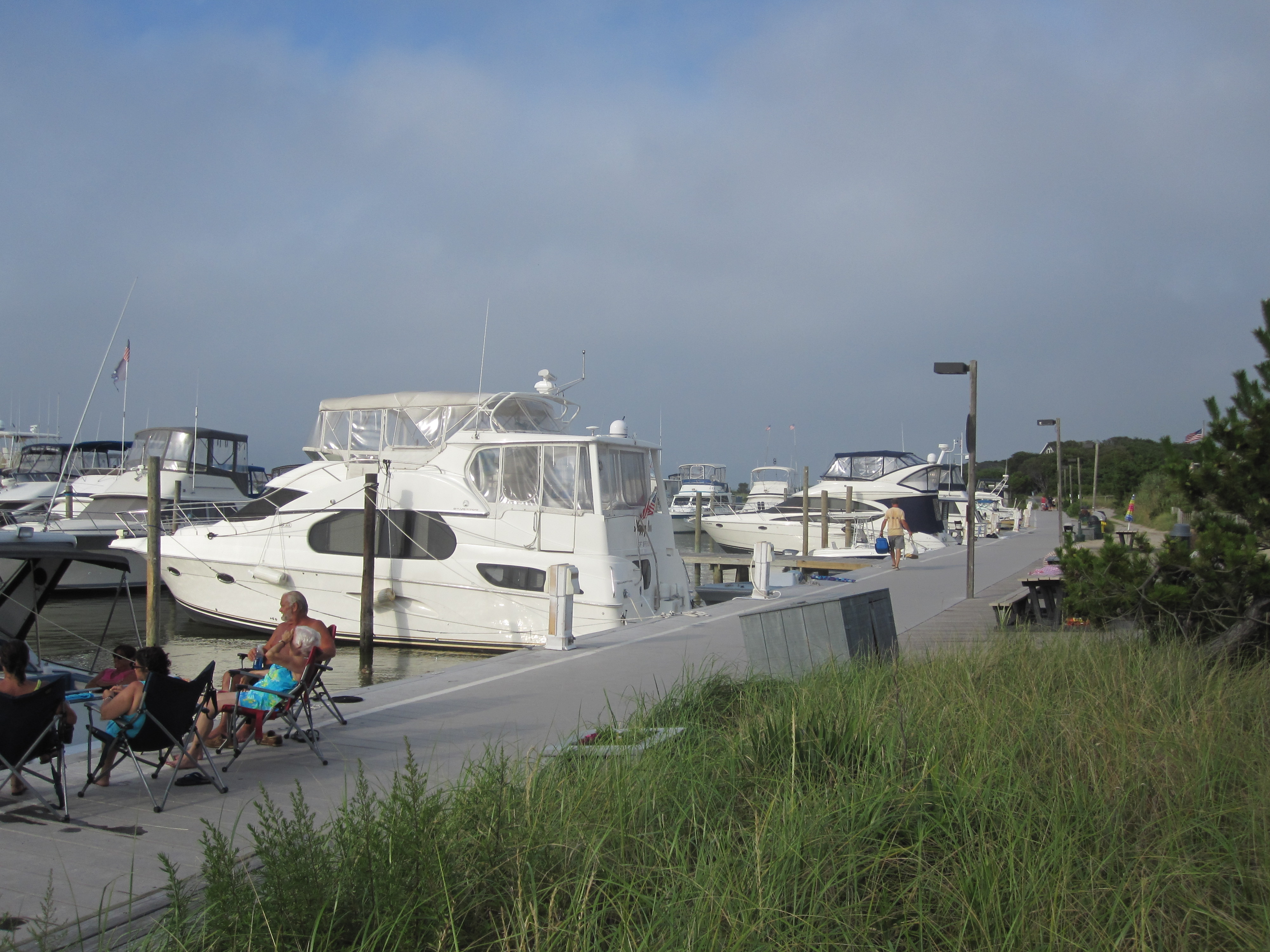

Preceded by High Dune Wilderness	Beaches of Fire Island	Succeeded by Water Island
