= John B. Whyte =

American businessman (1928–2004)

John Burlingame Whyte (May 22, 1928 – March 22, 2004) was an American model and real estate entrepreneur who developed Fire Island Pines, New York.

== Biography ==
Whyte was born in Milwaukee, Wisconsin and attended Washington University in St. Louis for two years before moving to New York City.

In the 1960s, Whyte bought the rebuilt Botel Pines and Dunes Yacht Club in Fire Island Pines. He bought the property after a May 31, 1959, fire destroyed the entire complex. Whyte encouraged the community's reputation as a gay destination. In 1967, artist Joseph Glasco spent the early part of the summer on Fire Island with Whyte. Whyte later became a collector of Glasco’s paintings. The Botel, which was known as The Hotel Ciel from 2004 - 2012, is still the central landmark and only hotel in the Pines.

He co-founded The Pines Conservation Society in 1970. In 1984, he founded From the Pines With Love which recruited celebrities to perform at fundraisers for AIDS research. In 2002, the Fire Island Pines Community House was named Whyte Hall. Shortly before his death in 2004, Whyte sold his Fire Island Pines properties. Funded largely by his estate, a completely reconstructed Whyte Hall was completed during 2007.

Whyte died on March 22, 2004, at the age of 75.

== See also ==
Fire Island Pines, New York
