= Point O' Woods, New York =

Point O' Woods
- Hamlet
- Nickname: POW
- Location within the state of New York Point O' Woods (New York)
- Coordinates: 40°39′05″N 73°07′43″W
- Country: United States
- State: New York
- County: Suffolk
- Town: Brookhaven
- Time zone: UTC−05:00 (Eastern Time Zone)
  - Summer (DST): UTC−04:00
- Area codes: 631, 934

Point O' Woods is a hamlet that consists of a private vacation retreat on Fire Island, New York, United States. Although it has services such as a ferry port, a general store, church and fire department, only members and their guests are allowed in through the hamlet's gate or on the private ferry that runs to Point O' Woods from Bay Shore, New York.

== History ==
Point O' Woods is said to have been the first European-American settlement on Fire Island, though Cherry Grove also makes that claim. The settlement was originally organized in 1894 for religious retreats, some from the Chautauqua assemblies. In approximately 1898, the Chautauqua group went bankrupt, and ownership passed to the Point O' Woods Association. This group still administers it today.

Today Point O' Woods serves as a summer vacation retreat for association members and their families. Many members are from the east coast, but there are also members and guests from the west coast, as well as a handful of families coming from outside the United States. The hamlet is opened by the association in mid-spring, and closed in early autumn each year.

=== Wreck of the Elizabeth ===
On July 19, 1850 the English barque Elizabeth sank after running aground on the Fire Island sandbar just off of Point O' Woods. Famed feminist author Margaret Fuller died in the wreck, along with her infant child. Three days after the sinking, Fuller's friend Henry David Thoreau arrived at Point O' Woods to search for her remains. Her body was never recovered.

== Geography ==
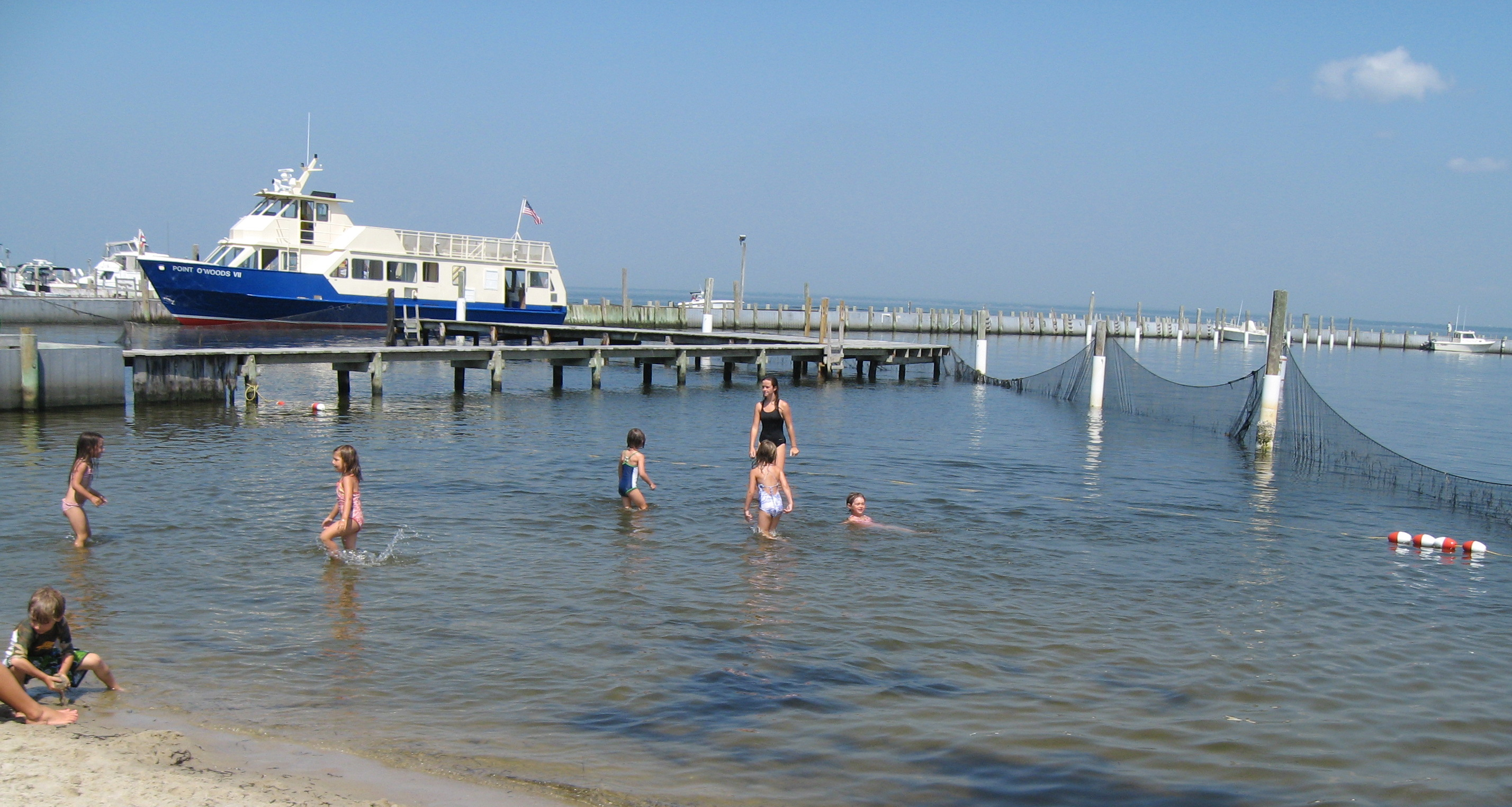
The hamlet's bay harbor includes a swimming area.

Point O' Woods is located within the Town of Brookhaven, between Ocean Bay Park and Oakleyville. The hamlet is separated from its nearest western neighbor, Ocean Bay Park, by a six-foot chain-link barrier known simply as "the Fence". The Sunken Forest, a park situated below mean high tide level serves as a natural barrier to the east. Tourists are not welcome; the ferry from Bay Shore is privately owned. Uninvited visitors who board may well be met by an association member when they arrive at the Point O' Woods dock and directed to return to Bay Shore.

== Demographics ==
Essentially a village-sized private club, Point O' Woods is noted for its insularity and exclusivity. The land on which the cottages are built are technically owned by the association, which offers long-term leases to the members who reside in them. Many members' families have summered there for generations.

== Government ==
Point O' Woods is not a municipality and has no government as such. Like a few other Fire Island enclaves, it is a privately owned parcel of land. It is subject to the political jurisdiction of the Town of Brookhaven in Suffolk County; local law enforcement is the duty of the Suffolk County Police Department's marine bureau. The beaches are (a) open to the public, and (b) regularly patrolled by state and local police, as well as by the National Park Service and United States Coast Guard.

== Education ==
Residents are zoned to the Fire Island School District. Students attend the Woodhull School (PK-6), and then may choose either Bay Shore School District or Islip School District for secondary education. Their respective high schools are Bay Shore High School and Islip High School.

== Infrastructure ==
As on much of Fire Island, cars are not permitted in Point O' Woods and bicycles are the principal means of wheeled transport. The community uses its private railroad, a half-mile long, 3 ft (914 mm) narrow gauge line to transport freight from the dock to key buildings in the community. It is not used for passenger service. In addition, the community operates a small fleet of motor vehicles to conduct maintenance, recycling and pest control.

Point O' Woods has its own church and volunteer fire department. It operated a post office until journalist Nat Hentoff, who was not a member of the community, protested because club rules denied him access to the federally funded U.S. post office located within the Point O' Woods grounds. Eventually, the hamlet resolved the dispute by giving up its federal post office; it now has no separate ZIP Code. Mail is delivered to the Bay Shore Post Office by the United States Postal Service and taken by ferry to Point O' Woods, where it is distributed privately.

== In popular culture ==
- In the television series Mad Men season 2, episode 6, "Maidenform", Trudy and Pete tell Bud and Judy Campbell they'll summer at Point O' Woods, so Pete can stay near the office. He says his presence there is important.

Preceded by Cherry Grove	Beaches of Fire Island	Succeeded by Ocean Bay Park
