= Ian Reisner =

American entrepreneur, and hotel and real estate developer

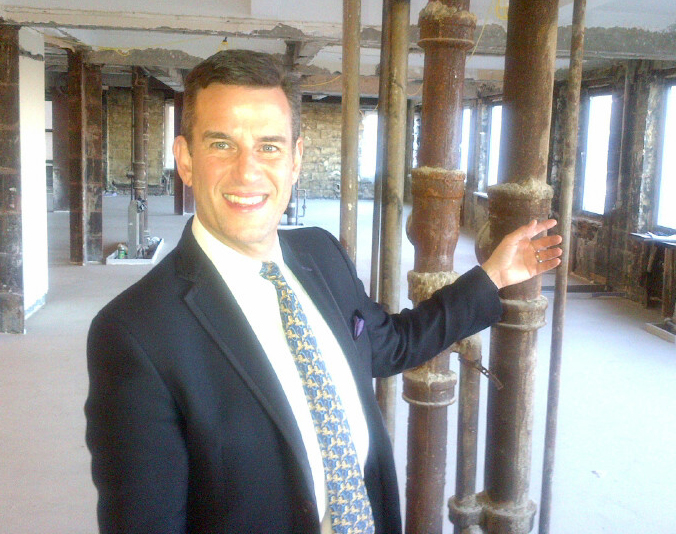
- Born: June 27, 1968 (age 58); New York, NY
- Education: Cornell University
- Occupations: Entrepreneur; Real estate developer
- Years active: 1990–present
- Partner: Mati Weiderpass (1993-2012)
- Website: parkviewdevelopers.com

Ian Simpson Reisner (born June 27, 1968) is an American entrepreneur, and hotel and real estate developer. He is the founder of Parkview Developers, and co-founder of Watch World International and The Out NYC hotel & resort.

== Early life and education ==
Reisner was born and raised in a Jewish family in New York City. He graduated from Cornell University in 1990,.

== Career ==
=== Watch World ===
In 1994, while still working at Salomon Brothers, Reisner, his partner Mati Weiderpass and Paul Dominguez founded Watch World International, opening the first Watch World store in New York City's SoHo neighborhood that year. By July 1997, they had opened nine New York locations. By 2000, Watch World had become a national chain of 119 stores. On June 8, 2000, Sunglass Hut International announced that it had purchased Watch World for $30 million in cash, stock and debt.

=== Parkview Developers and The 505 ===
Reisner is the founder, managing partner and president of Parkview Developers, a developer of residential and hotel properties, primarily in New York City, which he founded with Mati Weiderpass in 2000.

In 2007, Reisner and Weiderpass launched a 109-unit luxury condominium constructed on the site originally built for the New York Central Railroad in the 1930s.

Parkview Developers owns 20 units in the 230 Central Park South building in New York City. Starting in the early 1990s, Reisner and Weiderpass bought roughly half of the apartment units in the 19-story building. They combined, renovated and sold many of the units, including a penthouse sold for $11.9 million in 2014. Reisner lives in one of the penthouses in the building. Parkview Developers formerly owned and operated the Carnegie Hotel in Manhattan, near Columbus Circle.

=== The Out NYC ===
In 2007, after spending a few nights at the Axel Hotel Barcelona, part of a small chain of upscale hotels aimed at a gay clientele, Reisner decided to open a similar type of hotel in New York. He located a vacant space in Manhattan's Hell's Kitchen neighborhood and secured a 49-year lease. The property was originally home to a Travelodge in the 1960s, and was later used as a Red Cross homeless shelter.

The hotel opened on March 1, 2012. The $30 million entertainment complex consists of a three-story, 70,000 square-foot hotel with 105 rooms, the 11,000 square-foot XL/BPM Nightclub, the Mediterranean-inspired KTCHN Restaurant, an art gallery, outdoor gardens, a spa and a bar. The Out NYC was built after five years of planning. It won a Trendsetter Hotel Award from Fodor's in 2012, and in 2014 Fodor's named its garden one of the world's 10 most beautiful hotel gardens. Past performers at The Out NYC and the XL/BPM Nightclub include Alan Cumming, Cyndi Lauper and Ariana Grande; celebrity guests include Lady Gaga, Perez Hilton, James Franco and Nick Jonas.

Reisner was sued by architect Paul Dominguez in 2013 for his failure to properly compensate Dominguez for work on the Out NYC.

=== Fire Island Pines ===
On January 22, 2015, Reisner and Sip-N-Twirl nightclub owner P.J. McAteer purchased a strip of commercial real estate along the harbor on Fire Island Pines, a gay destination on Long Island, New York, for $10.1 million at auction.

== Television and film ==
Reisner appeared on season 3 of Million Dollar Listing New York on Bravo. His penthouse duplex at 230 Central Park South has appeared on 30 Rock and in the film Did You Hear About the Morgans? The Out NYC was featured on the sitcom Happily Divorced.

== Controversy ==
On October 29, 2014, 23-year-old Sean Verdi died of an apparent drug overdose at St. Luke's Hospital in Manhattan after being found unconscious in a Manhattan apartment owned by Reisner.

On April 20, 2015, Reisner and Weiderpass hosted a private discussion with U.S. Senator Ted Cruz at Reisner’s apartment. Cruz’s positions on LGBTQ+ rights prompted criticism from some in the LGBTQ+ community after news of the meeting became public. In response, Broadway Cares/Equity Fights AIDS canceled a planned fundraiser at XL Nightclub. Reisner later issued a statement on his Facebook page expressing regret, calling the decision to host the meeting “a terrible mistake” and acknowledging “poor judgment.” Some additional attention followed remarks he made in an interview, where he described parts of his clientele as “frugal” and “entitled.”

== Personal life ==
Reisner's brother, equestrian Ross Reisner, was murdered in September 2013 by Brett C. Knight. Knight was sentenced to 22 years in prison for the crime.
