= Trinity Episcopal Church (St. Louis, Missouri) =

Historic church in Missouri, United States

Trinity Episcopal Church is an Episcopal parish in the Central West End neighborhood of St. Louis, Missouri. It is distinguished by its history of LGBTQ advocacy, beginning in 1969 with its association with the Mandrake Society. For this, the building was listed on the National Register of Historic Places in 2020.

== History ==
The Episcopal Church built a small church at the corner of Euclid and Washington Streets in St. Louis, Missouri in the late 1800s. This church, the Episcopal Church of the Redeemer, merged with another congregation, the St. James Memorial Church, and moved the latter's building to the Euclid & Washington site. The congregation, renamed the Church of the Redeemer, worshiped here until 1935. In that year, the congregation of the Trinity Episcopal Church, founded in 1855, purchased the Church of the Redeemer's building and began to use it.

By the time the church expanded with a parish hall in 1954, the demographics of the surrounding area had changed, with African-American and LGBTQ communities replacing upscale residents. Trinity focused its outreach on these two communities. The Mandrake Society, the first LGBTQ organization in St. Louis, was founded in 1969, and by the summer, Trinity was hosting its meetings in its building. The organization financially supported the legal defense of nine men who were arrested on anti-LGBTQ measures on October 31, 1969. By the end of the year, the 18-member group had grown to more than 150 people. Trinity financed the publication of the organization's newsletter in exchange for promotion of the congregation. In the 1970s, Trinity hosted the St. Louis chapters of the Gay Liberation Front and Integrity.

The city's first AIDS social service organization was founded in 1984 by gay activists in Central West End and soon moved into the church's North Parish Hall. Trinity became a haven for stigmatized HIV positive individuals. These included Rev. Charles Bewick, who was ousted from his position, and died from AIDS in 1989. That year, many of the church congregation marched in the St. Louis Pride Parade to honor Bewick. Trinity also performed burials of AIDS victims who were refused services elsewhere.

Rev. Bill Chapman began to privately bless same sex partnerships in 1987. Rev. Susan Nanny, who was openly lesbian, joined as co-rector in 1990. On July 27, 1991, Chapman publicly performed a same-sex ceremony for the first time in front of the congregation. Though these actions were initially controversial in the Diocese of Missouri, the diocese approved same-sex unions in 1996. The church hosted a Mayoral forum on gay and lesbian rights on February 8, 1993, the first of its kind in the city.

In 2020, the church became the first site in Missouri to be recognized for its LGBTQ significance; it was approved by the State Historic Preservation Office and listed by the National Park Service on the National Register of Historic Places.

== See also ==
- LGBT historic places in the United States
