= Fire Island Pines, New York =

Fire Island Pines
- Hamlet
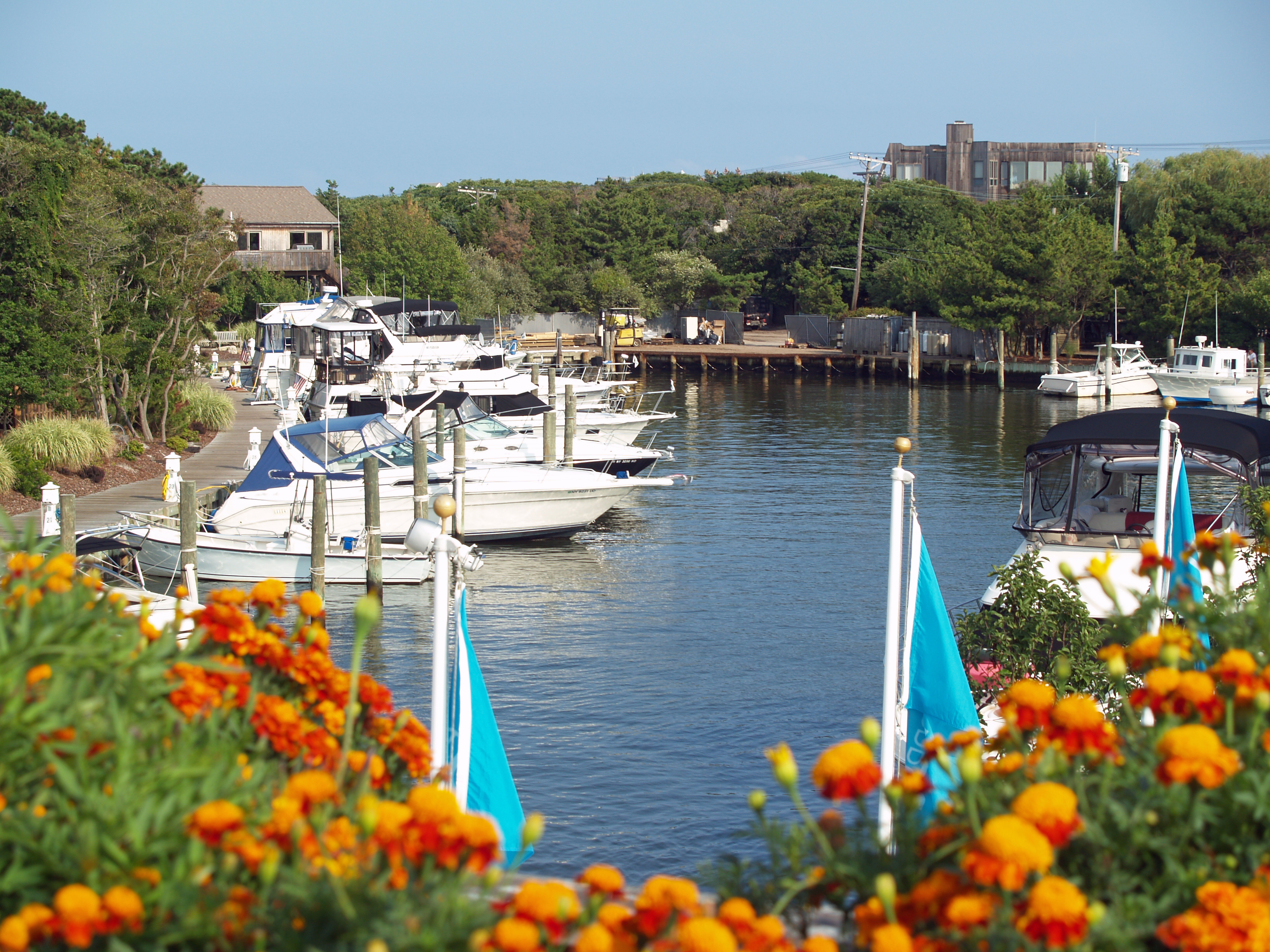
- The marina from the west side shops area looking east
- Nicknames: The Pines, Pines, FIP
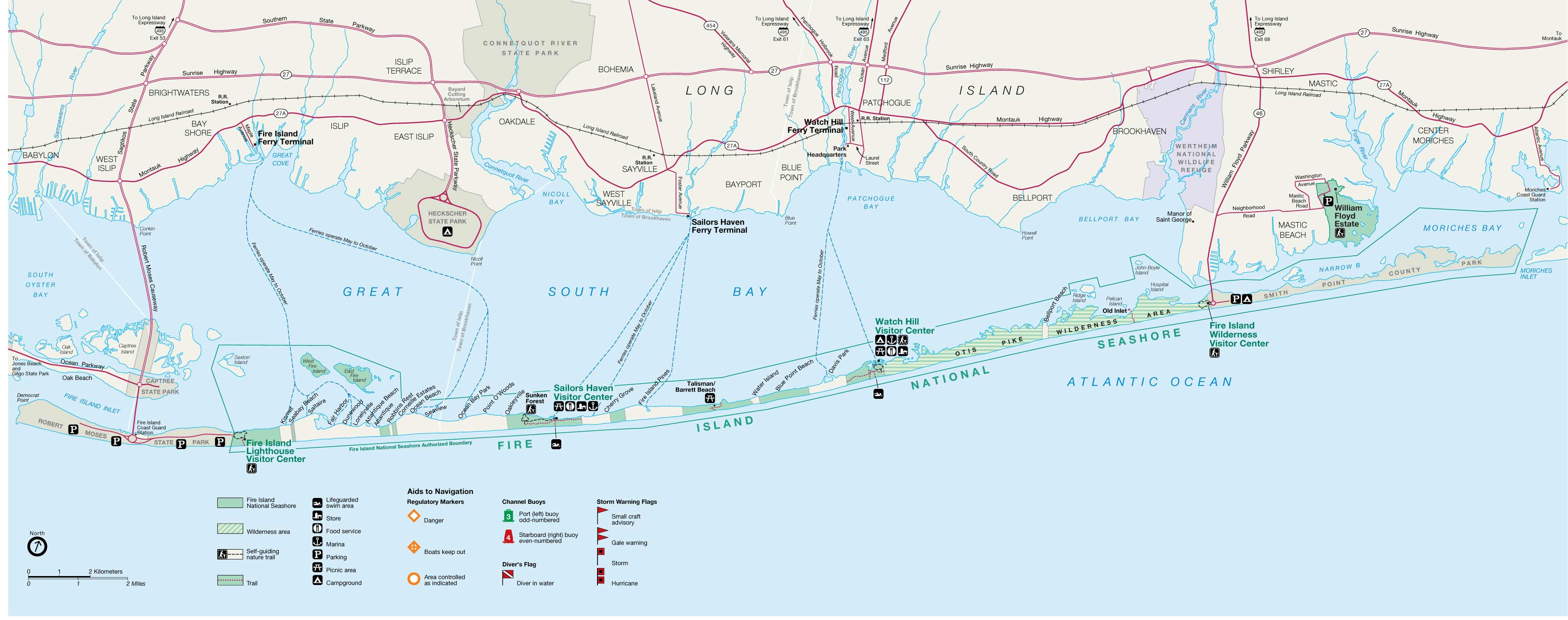
- Location within the state of New York Location on Fire Island
- Coordinates: 40°39′55″N 73°4′6″W
- Country: United States
- State: New York
- County: Suffolk
- Lots first sold: 1952

Population (2004)
  - Total: 12 (full-time)/2,500 to 3,000(seasonal)
- Time zone: UTC−05:00 (Eastern Time Zone)
  - Summer (DST): UTC−04:00
- ZIP Code: 11782
- Area codes: 631, 934
- Website: Fire Island Property Owners Association

Fire Island Pines (often referred to as The Pines, simply Pines, or FIP) is a hamlet in Brookhaven, New York, United States. It is located on Fire Island, a barrier island separated from the southern side of Long Island by the Great South Bay.

Fire Island Pines and the adjoining Cherry Grove are the areas most strongly associated with the gay community on Fire Island. The island has been referred to as America's first gay and lesbian town and served since the 1920s and 1930s as a refuge for vacationers and others who desired the more liberal attitude the island's occupants allowed.

The Pines, which has the most expensive real estate on Fire Island, has about 600 houses and a 100-unit condominium complex on its square mile of location. It has two-thirds of the swimming pools on Fire Island. Its summer seasonal population is between 2,500 and 3,000. In 2004, 12 people listed it as their full-time residence.

Transportation is via foot on the boardwalks. If a person wishes to carry groceries, the traditional way to do so is to pull red wagons (commonly the Radio Flyer).

== History ==
Fire Island Pines derives its name from the scrub pine trees in the area, which, according to legend, started growing after a ship with Christmas trees and holly foundered off its coast in the late 19th century.

The Pines was originally the site of a Coast Guard station built in 1876 and known as Lone Hill Saving Station. The area was purchased by the Home Guardian Company in 1924. As no development occurred, the area became a popular nude beach. Squatters erected temporary buildings. The "harbor" is the area where all the commercial buildings are located, including docks for yachts, the passenger ferry from Sayville, and freight operations.

In the 1960s, the Sandpiper gay dance club opened; it is now called the Pavilion.

=== Fires ===
There have been two major fires in Fire Island Pines' business area. The first was on May 31, 1959, after which John B. Whyte purchased the burnt-out hotel for redevelopment.

On November 14, 2011, a fire destroyed the Pavilion, including its commercial tenants. That iteration of the building had been built in 1980. Forty-three Long Island fire companies responded to the blaze, which began around 8 p.m. Some 400 firefighters worked in shifts through the night to extinguish the fire.

== Developers and real estate owners ==
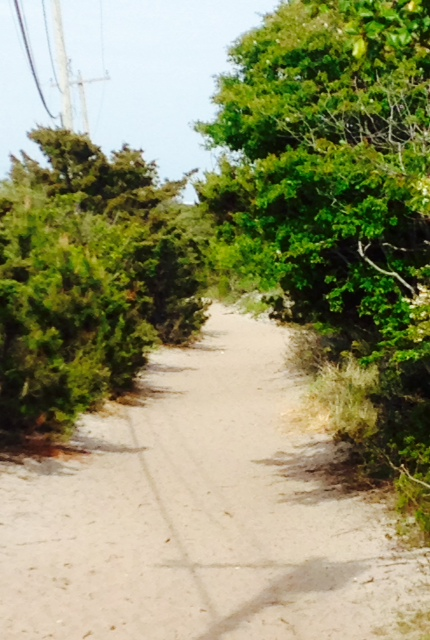
The path linking the communities of Cherry Grove and Fire Island Pines, officially the Carrington Tract, has been known as Judy Garland Memorial park and the Meat Rack.

=== The Smadbecks ===
Plans for development began in 1952 when Warren and Arthur Smadbeck, doing business as the Home Guardian Company, announced plans to sell 122 lots in the new subdivision while building a private harbor for yachts, a large landing dock, and a private park facing the harbor. The Smadbecks, who sold more than 700,000 lots around the country, had purchased the property from the Sammis family, which had owned it since buying most of Fire Island in 1855 when they built the Surf Hotel near the Fire Island Lighthouse, in what is now the community of Kismet.

The basic Smadbeck layout of the Pines remains to this day, including the Botel, which was designed to be a simple, no-frills, dormitory-style accommodation for those who docked their yachts in the harbor.

Among the earliest property owners were Pola Negri, Xavier Cugat, Mary Martin and Joan McCracken. A 15-year-old Jane Fonda taught dance classes.

=== Peggy Fears ===
Peggy Fears, a Broadway showgirl, had discovered Lone Hill on an outing to a neighboring Fire Island community. Fears built the original yacht club. Part of the construction was a cinderblock hotel which still stands today. She invested $10,000 and bought an inlet on Great South Bay. In 1959, she paid off the last of her debt on her property. It was then valued at $350,000.

Today's Fire Island Pines took shape after the Botel and associated yacht club buildings burned on May 31, 1959. Fears rebuilt Botel.

While a resident of Fire Island, Fears had a stormy romantic relationship with Tedi Thurman, famed in the 1950s as the sexy voice of Miss Monitor on NBC's Monitor. Thurman was interviewed about her life with Fears for Crayton Robey's documentary film When Ocean Meets Sky (2003), which features Sara Ramirez as the voice of Peggy Fears. In 1966 she sold her interest to Whyte.

=== John B. Whyte ===
Former model John B. Whyte encouraged its reputation as a gay destination after buying the rebuilt Botel Pines and Dunes Yacht Club in the 1960s (Cherry Grove was already a gay destination when Whyte developed the Pines). The Botel, which was known as The Hotel Ciel from 2004 to 2012, is still the central landmark and only hotel in the Pines.

The conversion to a gay destination proved divisive among the initial owners. A large sign near the dock read, "Welcome to Fire Island Pines A Family Community." It also proclaimed "We believe in a community that is clean both morally and physically."

Whyte bent rules to accommodate the gay crowd. "We had a Hully Gully line right here in the restaurant. I would put a girl at each end—men weren't allowed to dance with men back then—and everyone would have a good time."

Visitors in the 1960s included Hedy Lamarr, Betty Grable and Zachary Scott.

Whyte, who owned 80 percent of the commercial property in the Pines, instituted the community's central social activity schedule of "Low Tea" (drinks—particularly the "Blue Whale" cocktail of Curaçao liqueur and gin that turned patrons' tongues blue—at the Blue Whale from 5 pm to 8 pm) followed by "High Tea" (drinks at the Pavilion from 8 pm to 10 pm) followed by an evening of dancing at the Pavilion (all of which were Whyte establishments).

=== Eric von Kuersteiner ===
For three decades, John B. Whyte helped attract a celebrity crowd and developed the area with a more sophisticated cachet. In 2003, Whyte decided to sell all of his commercial holdings and sought out a specific buyer: Eric von Kuersteiner, who had been frequenting the Pines since the late 1980s. Whyte had an asking price of $11 million. His broker negotiated the sale for $9 million.

=== Matthew Blesso, Seth Weissman & Andrew Kirtzman ===
In 2009, Matt Blesso, Andrew Kirtzman, and Seth Weissman were a trio of investors known as FIP Ventures.

=== Ian Reisner and P. J. McAteer ===
In January 2015, the majority of the commercial properties and operating businesses, including the Pavilion and Blue Whale, were purchased at auction by Ian Reisner for $10.1 million in debt and equity. At that time, competing operator P. J. McAteer contributed three businesses (Sip & Twirl, Pines Pizza, Pines Bistro & Martini Bar) to the purchasing entity, Outpost Pines, in exchange for a minority equity stake in the new company. McAteer is the current operator of the Outpost Pines harbor businesses (Canteen, Pool Bar, Botel, Blue Whale, Bistro, Pizza, Sip & Twirl) with Reisner providing additional financial support.

== Life in the Pines ==
Fire Island has an official year-round population of 310. The summer population is far larger, especially on weekends. In the Pines, the large houses are filled with summer shares; a four-bedroom house can contain eight people at a time. The population is primarily gay men 20 to 50 years old. It is affectionately referred to as "Chelsea with sand", alluding to one of Manhattan's gayer neighborhoods.

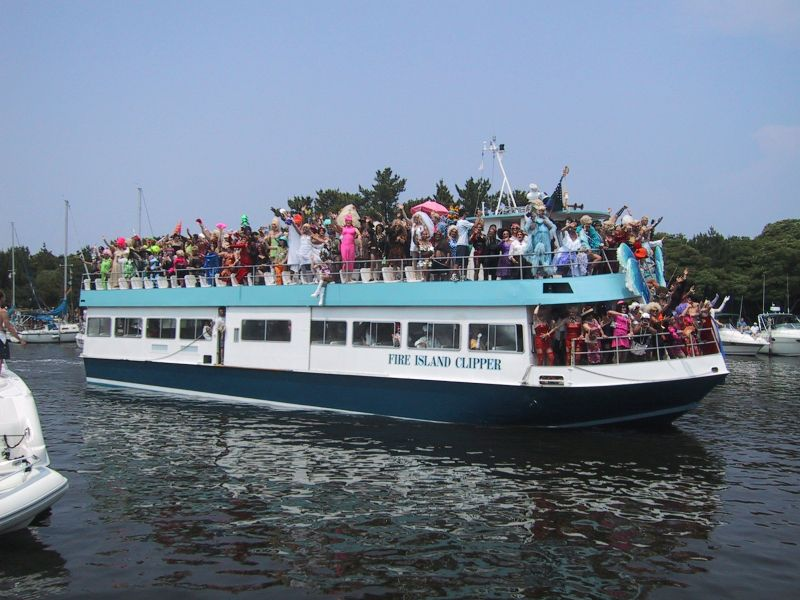
A ferry with drag queens during the Invasion of the Pines arrives at Pines Harbor

The summer sees high-profile events and fundraisers. Fire Island Dance Festival, a program of Broadway Cares/Equity Fights AIDS, is produced by Dancers Responding to AIDS.

The Invasion of the Pines is a drag-queen parade held each July 4, commemorating when Whyte refused service to drag queen Terry Warren. After promenading through the Pines, the drag queens from Cherry Grove proclaim victory and return to Cherry Grove.

Pines Party is an all-night dance party held on the last weekend of July on the beach. It is the reincarnation of GMHC's Morning Party fundraiser, which from 1983 to 1998 had become a major circuit party and GMHC's biggest fundraising event. But the party had also developed a reputation for recreational drug-use that contradicted GMHC's mission statement, so the organization announced the end of the event on December 30, 1998, after a death and 21 arrests at that year's event. Proceeds from the successor Pines Party go to lower-profile organizations of the Stonewall Community Foundation (which uses the money to help those with HIV) and the Fire Island Pines Property Owners Association Charitable Foundation (which uses the funds to make improvements to the common areas).

Von Kuersteiner started Ascension Weekend, a not-for-profit charitable three-day weekend event, to serve as a travel and tourist attraction in the historically lackluster month of August. Since 2006, it has played host to award-winning DJs such as Freemasons. Its parent charity, the Fund in the Sun Foundation, has donated more than $750,000 to LGBT charities such as Hetrick-Martin Institute, The Trevor Project, National LGBTQ Task Force, Live Out Loud, Standing Tall, and Friends In Deed.

== Transportation ==
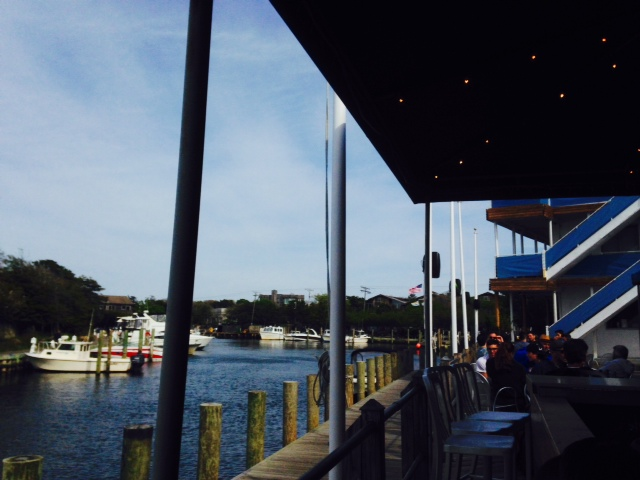
View of the Fire Island Pines Marina from a nearby bar

Fire Island Pines is only accessible by water with most residents and visitors using a passenger ferry or private water taxi. A small marina is also available. There are no private vehicles in this part of Fire Island, although police and service vehicles are seen on the beach from time to time. The Pines has no paved roads and the cottages and beach are only accessible using a series of wooden boardwalks.

=== Sayville Ferry ===
Fire Island Pines can be accessed via the Sayville Ferry Service departing from Sayville, New York, across the Great South Bay. The Long Island Rail Road connects Sayville to New York City.

Passengers connecting between the Sayville LIRR station and the Sayville Ferry service can pay for a shuttle van or taxi ride, or may walk or ride their bicycle the mile and a half distance. People driving cars may park in large, gravel parking lots across the street from the ferry dock.

=== Fire Island Water Taxi ===
Visitors arriving by car may park at the Robert Moses State Park "Field Five" parking lot. After reaching the Fire Island Lighthouse, the Fire Island Water Taxi will ferry paying customers to the Pines. A water taxi provides short-distance transportation for those moving from place to place along the coast of Fire Island. The fare and schedule for the taxi service varies by season.

== Health care ==
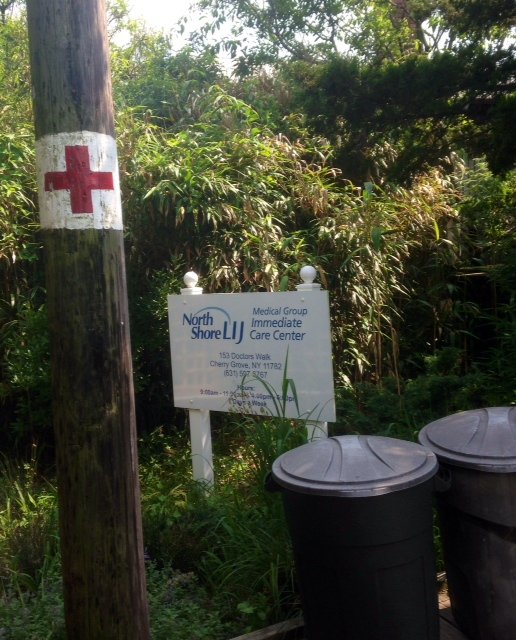
Northwell Urgent Care on Fire Island (Locations in Ocean Beach and Cherry Grove)

Northwell Health operates two urgent care facilities on Fire Island (one in Cherry Grove and the other in nearby Ocean Beach). These centers operate during the summer from Memorial Day through Labor Day, and are open for walk-in patient visits seven days a week from 9 to 11 AM and 4 to 6 PM. If patients require medical treatment outside of those hours, the Immediate Care Center's physician can be reached on call by contacting local police.

Good Samaritan Hospital, South Shore University Hospital, and Long Island Community Hospital (formerly Brookhaven Hospital) are located directly across the Great South Bay from Fire Island in the Long Island hamlets of West Islip, Bay Shore, and East Patchogue, respectively. A heliport for medevac helicopter use is adjacent to Good Samaritan Hospital. Specially equipped boats provided by the Suffolk County Police Department Marine Bureau docked at the various communities on Fire Island provide emergency transportation to individuals in need of dire medical care. In many cases, Long Island based ambulances will meet the boats once they cross the Bay (roughly 4.5 miles) and then drive individuals the short distance to one of the three hospitals. Also, one emergency access road connects Long Island (West Islip) to Fire Island (Kismet). However, the road ends there and does not extend the full length of the island into the other communities.

== Notable people ==
- Harold Baer Jr., former resident, deceased
- Josh Barro, current resident
- Robin Byrd, current resident
- Sam Champion, former resident
- David Geffen, former resident
- Horace Gifford, former resident, deceased
- Dennis Kenney, current resident
- Calvin Klein, former resident
- Joan McCracken, early resident, deceased
- Tommy Tune

== See also ==
- Boys in the Sand
- Dancer from the Dance
- Fire Island
- Fire Island (TV series)
- Longtime Companion (1989) — The first wide-release theatrical film to deal with the subject of HIV/AIDS has locations filmed in Fire Island Pines.
- The Normal Heart (film) — A 2014 HBO film also regarding the early years of the HIV/AIDS crisis in the United States

Preceded by Water Island	Beaches of Fire Island	Succeeded by Cherry Grove
