= Brini Maxwell =

American drag queen

Sabrina “Brini” Maxwell is the drag persona of Ben Sander, described as the "prototypical, pre-feminist, 1960s homemaker." Maxwell has also been described as a composite of Doris Day, Mary Tyler Moore, Auntie Mame, That Girl, and Donna Reed; the character came to prominence in the late '90s as the host of her eponymous television show on public access in Manhattan, and later on the national cable television Style Network.

The name Brini came from a Stefanie Powers mini-series called "Deceptions" while Maxwell originated from Barbara Streisand's character in "What's Up, Doc?"

== Television ==
=== Cable access show ===
The pilot for the original Brini Maxwell Show debuted on Manhattan Neighborhood Network on January 1, 1998. The program originally started out as At Home with Tigs and centered on a drag character called Tigs Vanderveer, but the character and the show quickly morphed into the Brini Maxwell Show. The show aired for five years featuring tips, recipes, entertaining ideas, craft projects, home renovation and interior design schemes. It was produced by Sander's production company, V.R.U.S.P. Inc., and directed by Sander's mother, the actress Mary Jane Wells. Sanders cast many of the drag queens he met at the Imperial Court - one of the oldest and largest LGBT organizations in the world - as characters on the show, such as Thom Hansen (aka Panzi) and Philip Stoehr (aka Philomena). The show had a diverse, cult following: "Brini (rhymes with teeny) has received hundreds of letters and e-mail messages since the show began ... Brini has a wide following that extends beyond gay viewers. Many of those who write in are straight fans who say they tape the show for friends around the country."

In 1999, Maxwell was nominated for the Glam Award for Best TV Performer along with three other drag queens - Cookie, Hedda Lettuce, and Cherry Jubilee - and on December 2 she won the honor. It was reported that "some 300 drag queens and their guests burst into sustained applause as Brini, dressed in an ivory floor-length skirt with a side slit, a black sweater and a Mongolian lamb's wool wrap, swooshed through the crowd at Life at 158 Bleecker Street and onto the stage to accept the award."

=== Charming, Needs Work ===
In 2001 Sander was contacted by Amy Briamonte, east coast director of development for west coast based Termite Art Productions, a division of Lionsgate Television. Briamonte and Sander developed a pitch for the show for the Bravo network and received an order for a pilot. The pilot was produced in the summer of 2002 for a show titled Charming, Needs Work.

==== Premise ====
The premise for the show was Maxwell lived in an apartment that she redecorated every week. This concept was difficult to show in a pilot because it's based on the cumulative experience of seeing the changes each week. The pilot showed the transformation from un-remodeled apartment to finished and decorated space with segments about painting a super-graphic, having a piece of furniture reupholstered, making a stuffed dog using a new crafting technique featuring old concert T-shirts and a location segment with Kim Cattrall in her apartment.

=== The Brini Maxwell Show ===
After Bravo passed on the show Briamonte, Sander, and Termite Art pitched it to Stephen Schwartz and Heather Moran, newly named VP's of programming for the Style network, then a sister network to E! Entertainment Television. The pitch resulted in an order for a 13-episode season.

==== Production ====
The first season of The Brini Maxwell Show for the Style network was taped in the summer of 2003 with studio production taking place on the main stage at Unitel Studios on west 57th St. in New York City. Location shoots for the season were taped over a period of six months in New York City, Los Angeles, and Las Vegas. The Brini Maxwell Show debuted on the Style network on Thursday, January 1, 2004 at 10 p.m.

The second season went into production in the summer of 2004 and debuted in November 2005.

==== Episodes ====
Season	Episodes	Originally released	
Season	Episodes	First released	Last released
1	13	January 1, 2004	March 25, 2004
2	13	November 4, 2005	January 20, 2006

==== Cancellation ====
The show was cancelled after two seasons when Comcast hired Ted Harbert to helm the E! family of networks.

== Publications ==
=== Brini Maxwell's Guide to Gracious Living ===
In 2004, Sander was contacted by Ron Longe, then a publicist at Stewart, Tabori & Chang, a division of Abrams Books about publishing a Brini Maxwell book. The resulting book, Brini Maxwell's Guide to Gracious Living is divided into four sections - Daily Life, dealing with the basics of life, including eating well, creating a nice environment for yourself and defining your personal style; Entertaining, preparing for hosting parties and events and menus for them; Travel, making your forays into the world smoother and more organized and Life's Happy Milestones, how to mark the important moments in your life with style and panache.

Production on the book commenced in late 2004 with dedicated photo shoots done by photographer, Bradford Noble. The design was done by Tamar Cohen with original illustrations done by Karen Hsu. The book was published on October 1, 2005, with an initial printing of 15,000 copies. It was promoted with a book tour of the east and west coasts, including book launch parties at Phyllis Morris in Los Angeles and Trina Turk in Palm Springs.

==== Reception ====
The book was featured in the New York Magazine approval matrix for November 14th, 2005 with the blurb "Buy it for the irony, keep it for the truly good advice" in the position of just below the midline between highbrow and lowbrow and almost half way past the midline between brilliant and despicable. The Advocate (LGBT magazine) said "You'll flip your wig over this indispensable guidebook from the Style network's fiercest hostess"

== Ben Sander ==
Early Life

Sander was born on July 23, 1969, at Boston Lying In Hospital in Boston, Massachusetts, to Peter and Mary Jane. The first seven years of his life were spent in Wellesley, MA with his father teaching theater at Brandeis University and his mother alternately keeping house and acting in professional productions in Boston and New York as well as touring with her own one-woman adaptation of Pride and Prejudice. In 1976 the family moved to the small college town of Athens, Ohio, home of Ohio University. Ben attended elementary and middle school in Athens while his father taught in the graduate theater program there. In 1980 Peter Sander received a Pell grant and moved the family to Cleveland, Ohio, where he acted as a dramaturge for The Cleveland Play House. The Playhouse offered Ben his first opportunity to act professionally. He was cast as Bodo in a production of Lillian Hellman's Watch on the Rhine. The family returned to Athens in 1981 for two years. In 1983 Peter took a job with The University of Missouri in Kansas City, where Ben attended Center Senior High School. Ben performed in high school theatrical productions, but eventually forsook the stage for the costume room, becoming the costume designer during his senior year, using his extensive collection of vintage clothing as costumes for the productions that year. After graduating high school in 1987, Sander attended the Kansas City Art Institute foundations program.

In 1988 the family again moved; this time to Hempstead, Long Island, where his father had been hired as the chair for the theater department of Hofstra University. Ben worked at various jobs in New York City and also studied fashion illustration with Veronica Galati. He then applied to, and was accepted into the fashion design program at Fashion Institute of Technology in 1989. After four years of study, Sander graduated in 1993, and obtained a job at moderate dress house, BGB as an assistant designer. His job was making patterns for the samples; the company reorganized nine months after he was hired and he was let go. After that he worked at a bridal boutique, and two furriers before moving into Manhattan and developing The Brini Maxwell Show for television.
