= Water Island, New York =

Water Island
- Hamlet
- Location within the state of New York
- Coordinates: 40°40′32″N 73°1′45″W
- Country: United States
- State: New York
- County: Suffolk
- Time zone: UTC-5 (Eastern (EST))
  - Summer (DST): UTC-4 (EDT)
- GNIS feature ID: 968892

Water Island is a hamlet in Suffolk County, New York, on Fire Island in the Town of Brookhaven.

Water Island is a small private Fire Island beach community of about 50 houses on modest plots of Fire Island real estate. With Davis Park to the East and Barrett Beach to the west, Water Island is afforded a space cushion from Fire Island beach civilization – giving it a privacy that for its residents. Sayville Ferry Service of Sayville, NY provides scheduled ferries to the community.

== See also ==
- Fire Island, New York

| Preceded by Davis Park | Beaches of Fire Island | Succeeded by Fire Island Pines |
