= Panzi =

American LGBTQ rights activist

Panzi (b. Thom Hansen in 1953) is an American gay activist.

== Education and career ==
Hansen was educated at Pace University, where he studied business and accounting; thereafter he began working as a financial analyst, a business manager in the textile industry and an actor. He went on to establish his own real estate management firm which he ran for 10 years and is currently a vice president in the International Division of a major direct marketing firm. Hansen is openly gay and has been involved in the LGBT community since the early 1970s.

== Imperial Court System ==
Panzi joined the Imperial Court of New York in 1993 and was elected to serve as its Empress XII "The Empress of Loyalty and Laughter" between 1998–99 and President of the Board of Directors from 2003 to 2006. Panzi also served as the Executive Secretary on the International Court Council, which oversees over 70 local Imperial Courts in the United States, Canada and Mexico from 1997 to 2007. In August 2007 he was elected President of the Council at the Hamilton-Wentworth, Canada meeting of the International Court Council.

== LGBT activities ==
Since the early 1970s, Thom (Panzi) has been an LGBT activist with various organizations including the Christopher Street Liberation Day Committee (known as Heritage of Pride today); GMHC and the Arts Project of Cherry Grove. In the early 1990s, Thom was the executive director of the Community Research Initiative (an HIV/AIDS Research Organization). He also has participated in almost every March on Washington, D.C. and most demonstrations in New York City. Panzi continues to raise money for the LGBTQ community.

== Film and television ==
Panzi has appeared in several films, several Off-Broadway Shows and most notably on Cable Television, as the wacky neighbor, Mary Ellen on the Brini Maxwell Show.

The Panzi Invasion (2016) (watch now)
