= Frank Carrington =

Co-founder of Paper Mill Playhouse

Frank Carrington (September 13, 1893 – July 3, 1975) was the co-founder with Antoinette Scudder in 1938 of the Paper Mill Playhouse in Millburn, New Jersey, United States.

He had a sister, Gene Carrington, a resident of Millburn, near the Playhouse.

== Legacy ==
The Frank Carrington Excellence in the Arts Award is given in his honor.
