= Cherry Grove, New York =

Cherry Grove
- Hamlet
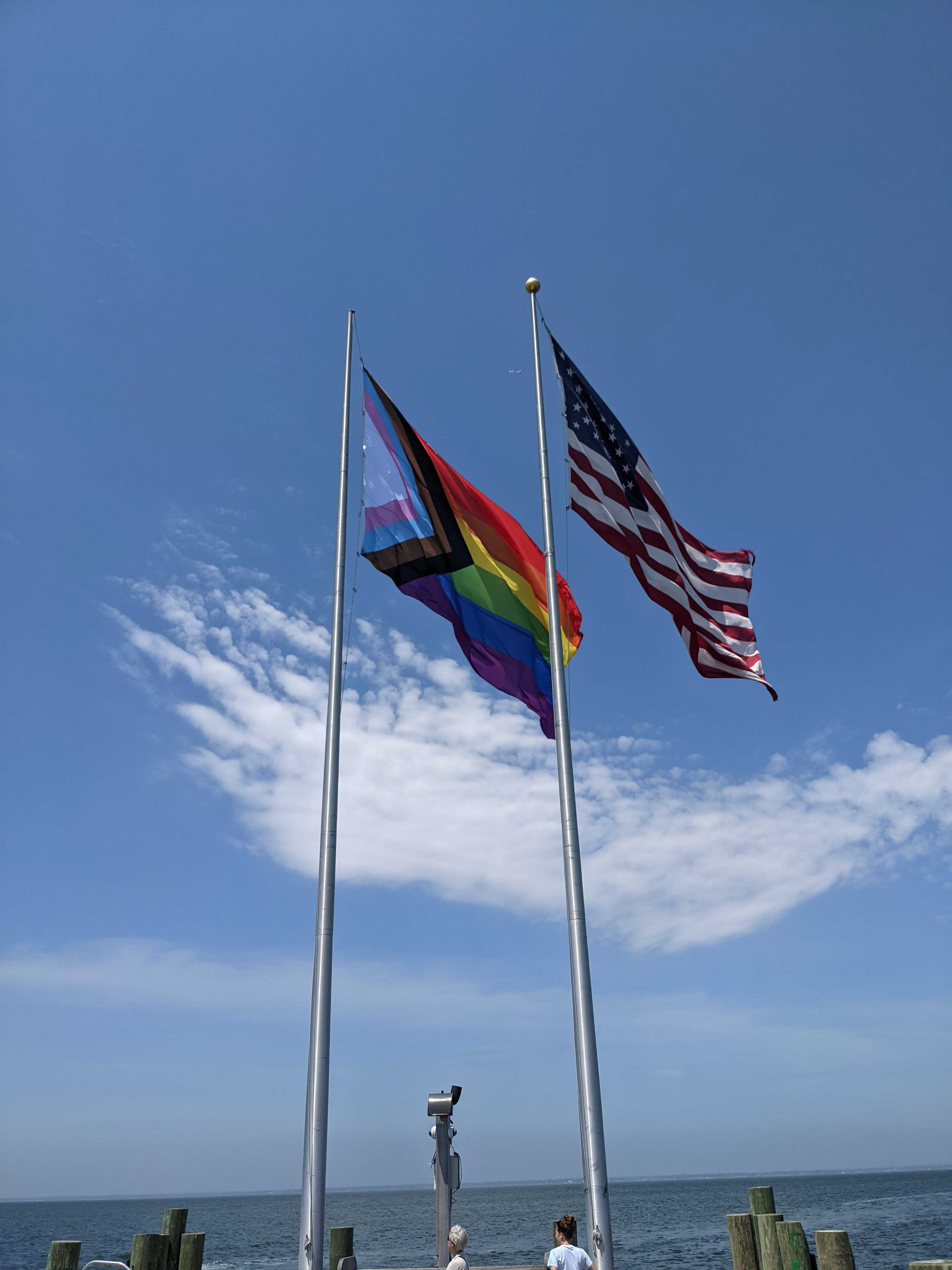
- Nickname: The Grove
- Location within the state of New York Cherry Grove (the United States)
- Coordinates: 40°39′38″N 73°5′17″W
- Country: United States
- State: New York
- County: Suffolk
- Town: Brookhaven
- Time zone: UTC−05:00 (Eastern Time Zone)
  - Summer (DST): UTC−04:00
- ZIP Code: 11782
- Area codes: 631, 934
- GNIS feature ID: 946512

Cherry Grove (often referred to locally as the Grove) is a hamlet in the Town of Brookhaven, Suffolk County, New York, United States. It is located on Fire Island, a barrier island separated from the southern side of Long Island by the Great South Bay. The hamlet has approximately 300 houses on 41 acres (17 ha), a summer seasonal population of 2,000 and a year-round population of 15.

Cherry Grove, along with nearby Fire Island Pines, is considered one of the most popular lesbian, gay, bisexual, and transgender (LGBT)–accepting resort communities in the United States.

== History ==
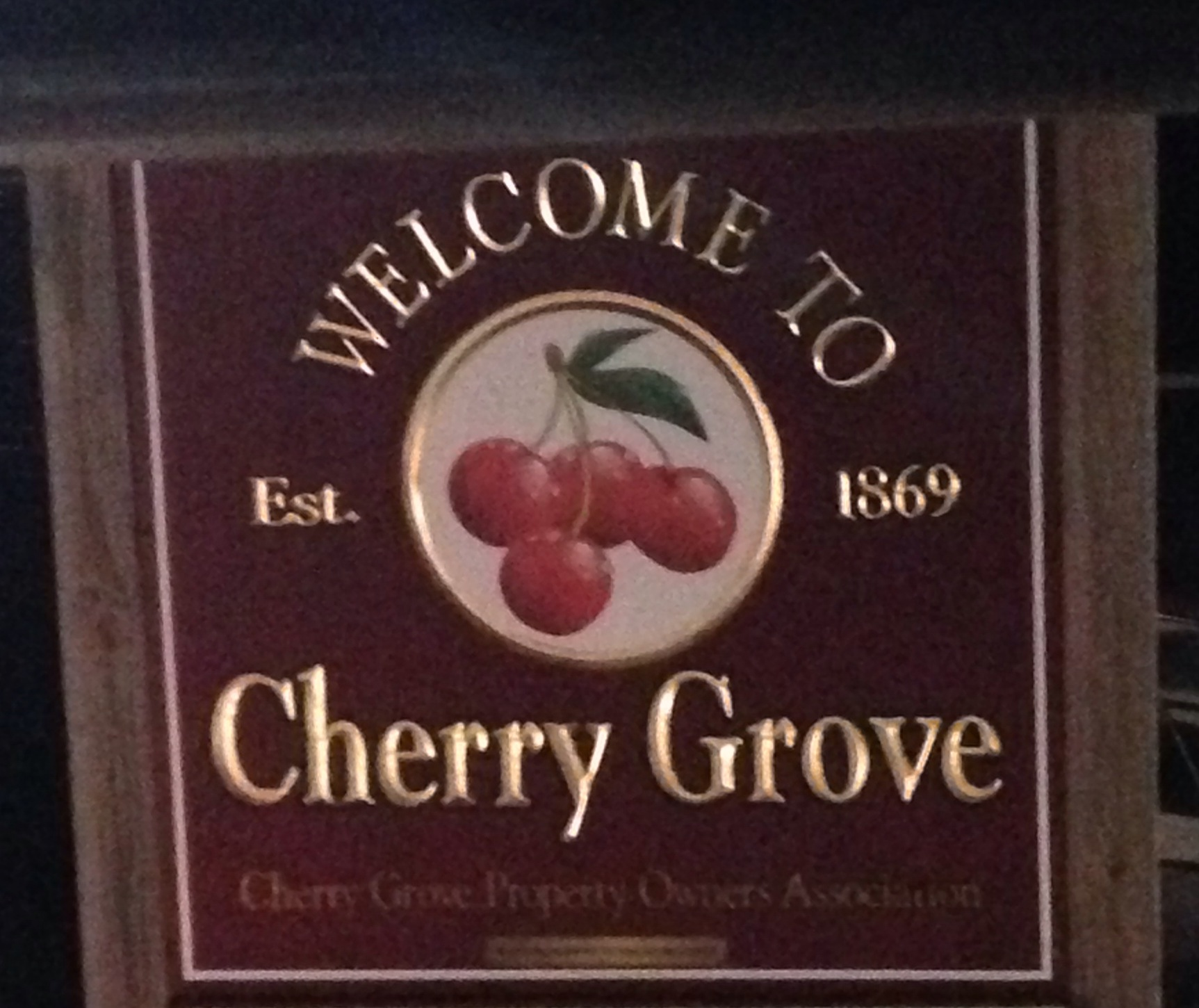
"Welcome to Cherry Grove" sign

=== 19th century ===
Cherry Grove dates its modern history to the 1868 purchase by Archer and Elizabeth Perkinson. They bought the land between Lone Hill (now Fire Island Pines) and the Cherry Grove Hotel from the ocean to the bay for 25 cents per acre and named the area for the black-cherry trees in the area. The Perkinsons opened a hotel in 1880. According to local legend Oscar Wilde stayed at the Perkinson Hotel.

=== 20th century ===
In 1921, the Perkinson family sold all the land east of Duryea Walk to Lone Hill, and then divided what was left into 109 building lots. A lot 50 × 80 feet (24 m) could be purchased for $250 or less, and ocean-front lots cost no more than a dollar a front foot. Buildings from the newly deactivated Camp Upton in Yaphank, were ported over to form the core of the new colony. A post office was established in 1922 at the site of where "Tides" (formerly "The Monster") is today; the first boardwalks were built in 1929. In 1930, Duffy's Hotel replaced the original hotel and was the only place with electricity and a phone.

The 1938 Long Island Express Hurricane destroyed much of Cherry Grove and discouraged mainlanders from coming. In their stead, the gay community that already frequented the island settled there moving from Ocean Beach, with figures such as Antoine de Paris and W. H. Auden leading the way.

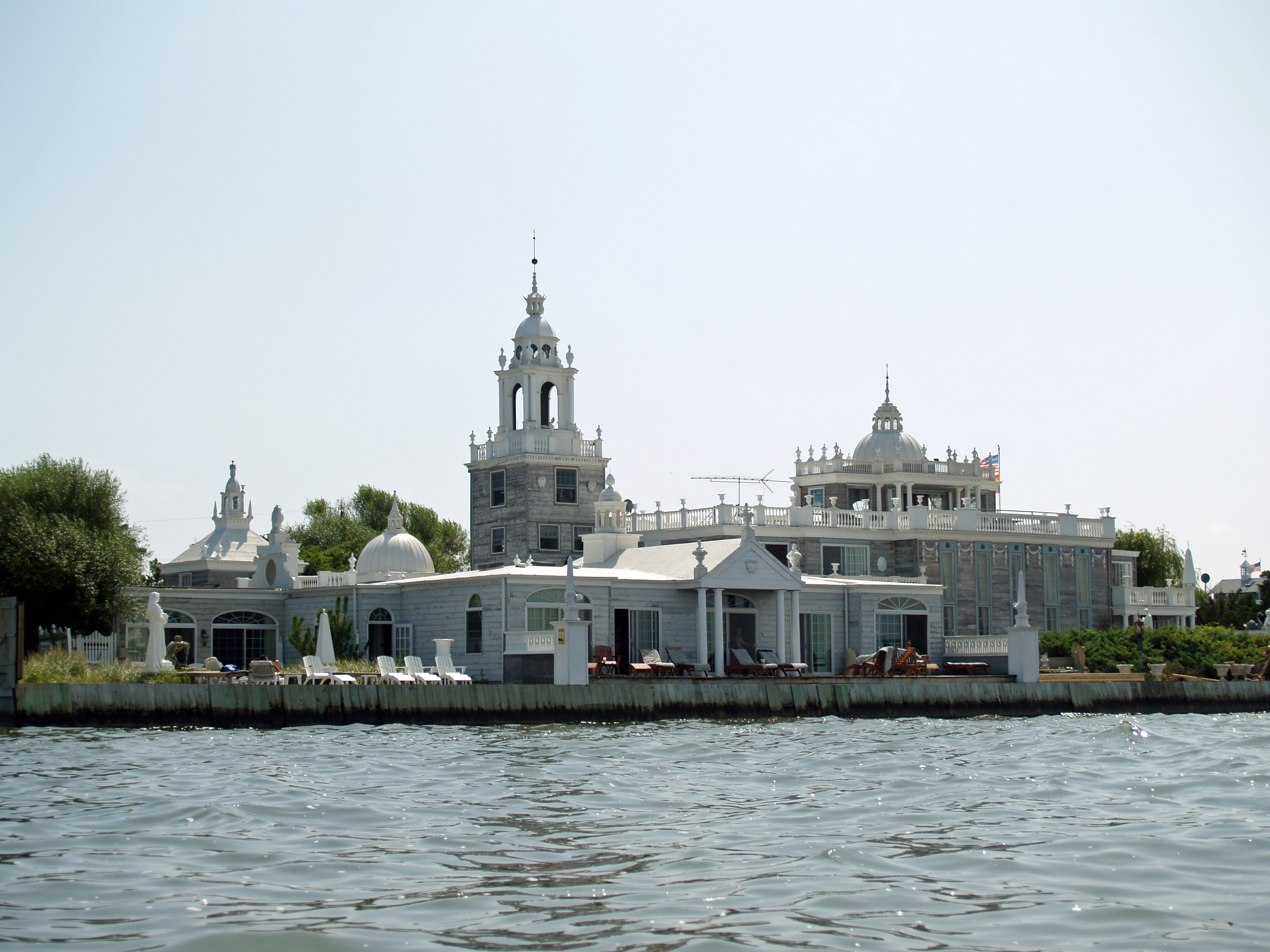
Belvedere

In the 1950s, Cherry Grove was already known as a "safe haven" one of three that included Provincetown, Massachusetts, and Key West, where they "could only fleetingly enjoy a carefree, 24-hour-a-day queer life by running off to a handful of destinations comfortably removed from a homophobic America." Only 60 miles from New York City, it was isolated because of its location off Long Island that required access by a ferry or, at the time, seaplane. The gay aura of the town supposedly arose when Christopher Isherwood and W. H. Auden arrived dressed as Dionysus and Ganymede, carried aloft on a gilded litter by a group of singing followers.

Truman Capote stayed at the Carrington House, just east of Cherry Grove, where in 1957, he completed his groundbreaking novella, Breakfast at Tiffany's.

The hamlet's major hotel and lounge in the 1950s was Duffy's, which burned on September 27, 1956, and was replaced by the Ice Palace Hotel. John Eberhardt, a developer who died in 2014, was credited for building the Belvedere Hotel and many other properties in the hamlet, from 1956 to the 1970s.

In early May 1959, James Baldwin visited Cherry Grove, staying in the Grove Hotel, where he wrote part of his intersectional novel, Another Country.

=== 21st century ===
While the Grove has its charms, several residents in 2005 expressed concerns about the lack of any services and population in the winter, the high cost of food and beverages, some "disrespectful visitors who come to party ... 'Day trippers'" (especially on the 4th of July), over-regulation of zoning by the town of Brookhaven, and a large population of voracious deer who eat up both beach grass and private gardens. A new generation of entertainers and socialites call Cherry Grove their summer home, including Hedda Lettuce, Michael Musto, Panzi, and Wanda Sykes and her wife and children.

In 2013, the Cherry Grove Community House and Theatre was listed on the National Register of Historic Places, one of only a few sites so far listed for their role in American LGBT history.

A "pop-up" urgent care center opened in 2014, which is part of Northwell Health; a golf cart for emergency medical services was also purchased for the Grove, for the new 24/7 paramedic services. Local residents "raised about $90,000 from donors to hire locally based paramedics, which have responded to more than 30 calls since May as of mid-August and will remain staffed through the end of September, when bustling crowds thin out at the beach."

In the early morning hours of March 27, 2015, an epic fire of historic proportions "destroyed" the Grove Hotel, Holly House, and two residential homes nearby; 23 fire companies responded from Fire Island and the south shore of Long Island and three firefighters were injured. The fire "engulfed" the surrounding properties, but the fire departments were able to put out the blaze, in this, "one of the most popular LGBTQ destinations." According to its social media accounts, the Ice Palace, a famous nightclub, "had negligible damage", but was not destroyed along with the hotel. The hotel has since been rebuilt.

== Neighborhoods ==
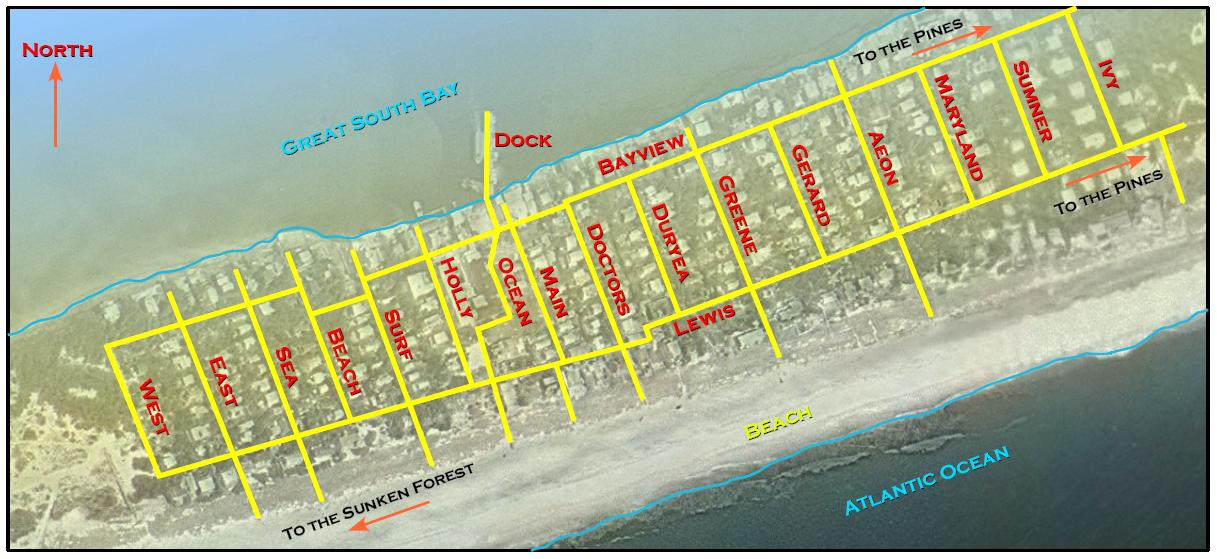
Map including the names of the two major walks (Bayview and Lewis), which are generally parallel to the beach, and 16 minor walks (Ivy, Sumner, Maryland, Aeon, Gerard, Greene, Duryea, Doctors, Main, Ocean, Holly, Surf, Beach, Sea, East, and West), which are generally perpendicular to the beach. (South Walk is between Surf and Beach.)

The entire community has a single seasonal post office, on Bayview Walk near the main dock, open from about May 1 to October 12, which is a popular place to congregate. Full services, such as money orders, are available at the Sayville, New York, post office, reachable from the ferry. The ZIP Code is 11782.

Despite the small size of the hamlet, at about 41 acres, the community is further divided into three or four neighborhoods, from west to east:

- The quiet, residential West End, also called Cherry Grove Estates, where the few year-round residents live in about 100 houses marked by stone chimneys, runs across the island from West Walk to Holly Walk. This was formerly the home of artist Paul Cadmus. Originally, the area between East and West Walks was called Cherry Grove Estates.
- The central business district, or Town, from Holly Walk to Doctor's Walk, and the beach to the bay, includes the Fire House, Community Center/Arts Project, The Ice Palace Resort, a clinic, and the public ferry dock, as well as a few cooperatives, bars, grocery store, gift shops, realtors, and restaurants. It is more densely settled than the rest of the hamlet. Several major structures in the center were "destroyed" by a large fire in March 2015, including the Grove Hotel (since rebuilt) and Holly House.
- The residential East End, from Doctor's Walk to Ivy Walk, and south of Bayview Walk, consists exclusively of about 100 private homes, almost all of which are seasonal.
- The northeastern section of the East End, north of Bayview Walk, has a few private homes and the 33-room Belvedere Guest House for Men, which was built in 1957 and first came into the real estate market in 2025.

Cherry Grove is accessible via two major walks (Bayview and Lewis), which are generally parallel to the beach, and sixteen minor walks (Ivy, Sumner, Maryland, Aeon, Gerard, Greene, Duryea, Doctors, Main, Ocean, Holly, Surf, Beach, Sea, East, and West), which are generally perpendicular to the beach. South Walk (not shown in the map at right) is parallel to the beach and extends between Surf and Beach Walks.

== Recreation and sites of interest ==
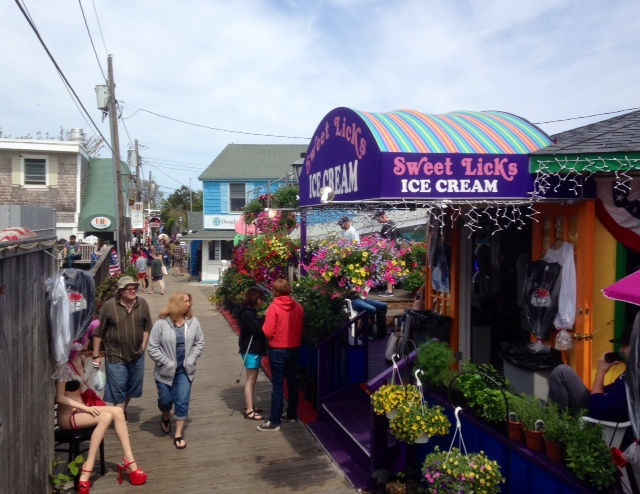
"Downtown" Cherry Grove, Fire Island

The Community House, located near the intersection of Holly and Bayview Walks, provides a wide variety of public services to the Grove. Generally speaking, gay couples and activities are the norm. In 2013, the Cherry Grove Community House and Theatre was named to the National Register of Historic Places for "the enormous role it played in shaping what gradually evolved into America's First Gay and Lesbian Town."

=== Outdoor activities ===
The main outdoor attraction is the beach and the surrounding protected portions of the Fire Island National Seashore. Clothing-optional sunbathing is common at the beach. The hamlet's easternmost dunes have been nicknamed the "Meat Rack". The legal name of that area is the Carrington Tract, where Truman Capote famously completed Breakfast at Tiffany's.

=== Entertainment and dining ===
There are at least six restaurants that operate within Cherry Grove, varying from pizza and breakfast to seafood and fine-dining. Also, there are at least four entertainment venues hosting plays, art shows, dancing, underwear parties, drag shows, and various community events.

As of 2005, there were five bars, but one closed during the Great Recession of the late 2000s.

=== Civic activities ===
Civic activities in the Grove include charity events and an Awards Night, during which votes are taken and titles bestowed upon residents and local businesses. The Arts Project of Cherry Grove hosts the Homecoming Queen show, variety and drag shows, and a gala dinner and dance in late September.

There is a sense of civic virtue in The Grove; people volunteer at CGFD, the Cherry Grove Community Association, on environmental projects, and even painting the edges of the boardwalks.

=== Annual events ===
A big event on the Cherry Grove social calendar is the Fourth of July weekend "Invasion of the Pines", which dates back to July 4, 1976, when a resident of the Grove showed up wearing drag in Fire Island Pines and was refused service. In the 1970s, the Pines was a more-conservative, more-heterosexual community than the Grove.

There are two annual drag show contests in Cherry Grove: the Homecoming Queen show over Memorial Day weekend, and the Miss Fire Island the longest running contest the weekend of, or after, Labor Day.

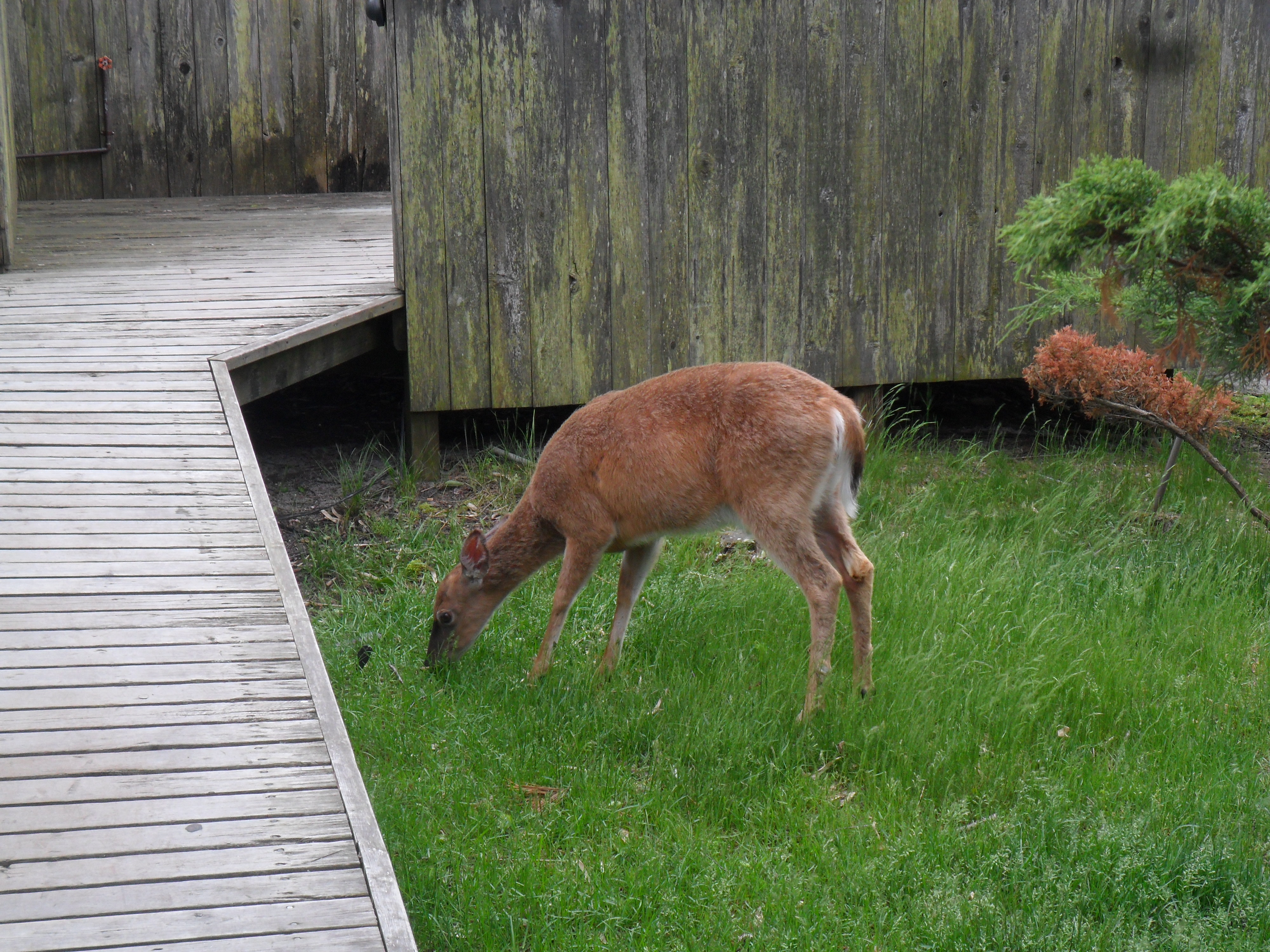
Deer grazing in Cherry Grove, Fire Island, New York.

=== Fauna and flora ===
The ecosystem of Cherry Grove is primarily pine barrens; however, there are several microclines and ecological niches. Raccoons, foxes, squirrels, and many species of birds can be seen throughout the summer.

Deer are common and quite tame on Fire Island. Some residents consider deer to be a nuisance, while others enjoy seeing wildlife close to their summer homes.

Cherry Grove is named for the many wild cherry trees that bloom each June in the area.

== Transportation ==
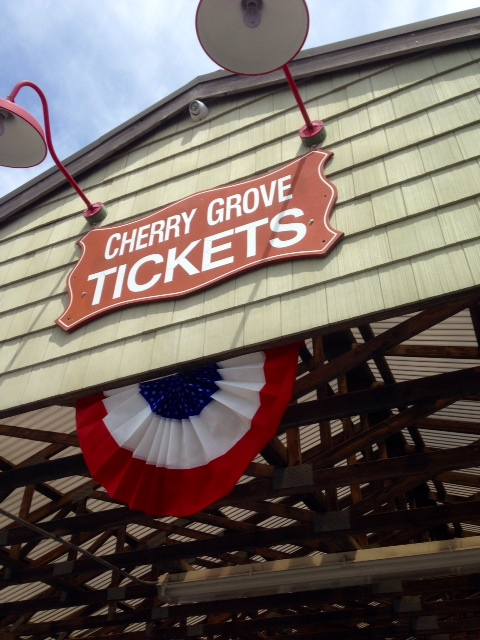
Entrance to board the ferry to Cherry Grove, Fire Island

Cherry Grove is only accessible by water with most residents and visitors using a passenger ferry or private water taxi. A small marina is also available. There are no private vehicles in this part of Fire Island, although police and service vehicles are seen on the beach from time to time. The Grove has no paved roads and the cottages and beach are only accessible using a series of wooden boardwalks.

=== Sayville Ferry ===
Cherry Grove can be accessed via the Sayville Ferry Service departing from Sayville, New York, across the Great South Bay.

The Long Island Rail Road connects Sayville to New York City. Passengers connecting between the Sayville station and the Sayville Ferry service can pay for a shuttle van or taxi ride, or may walk or ride their bicycle the mile and a half distance. People driving cars may park in large, gravel parking lots across the street from the ferry dock.

=== Fire Island Water Taxi ===
Visitors arriving by car may park at the Robert Moses State Park "Field Five" parking lot. After reaching the Fire Island Lighthouse, the Fire Island Water Taxi will ferry paying customers to the Grove. A water taxi provides short-distance transportation for those moving from place to place along the coast of Fire Island. The fare and schedule for the taxi service varies by season.

== Emergency services ==
=== Fire department ===
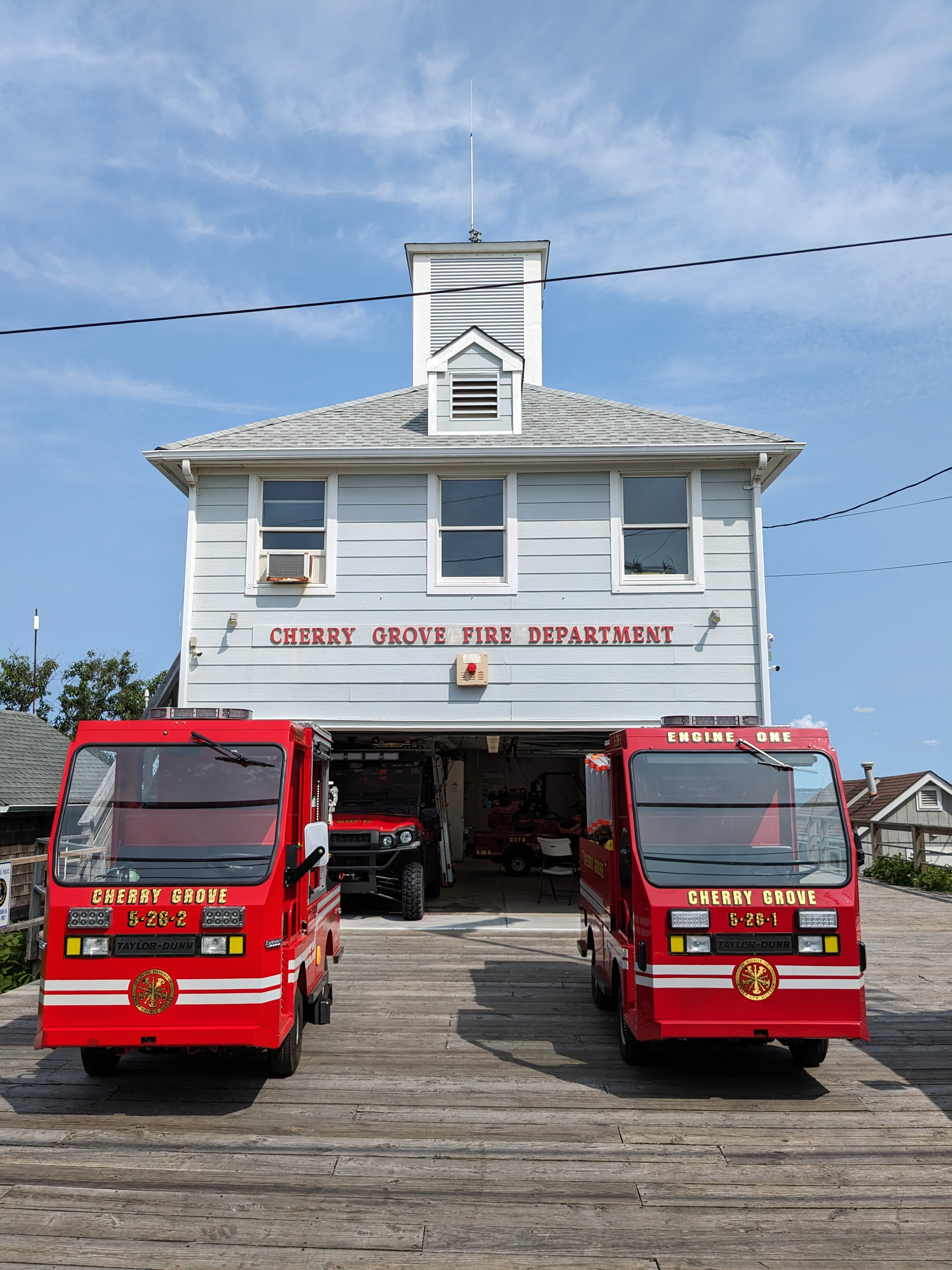

The Cherry Grove Fire Department (CGFD) is an all-volunteer department that has an Insurance Services Office (ISO) class 3 rating. Adjacent each of the community's 18 fire hydrants are hose sheds containing firefighting hose, hydrant adapters, and appliances that would be needed by the members to suppress a fire; this is due to the unique nature of Cherry Grove. There are no roads, only 6-foot wide boardwalks that change with the island's topography, and a typical fire engine would exceed the boardwalk's weight rating. If a fire or emergency is spotted, one should call 911. A fire siren is activated, which along with pagers, alerts the members to respond.

CGFD is a Basic Life Support First Response (BLSFR) agency, and as such has New York state certified emergency medical technicians that operate in conjunction with Cherry Grove EMS and the Suffolk County Police Department's marine bureau officers, to mitigate medical emergencies and patient transport. CGFD receives assistance from both neighboring Fire Island fire departments as well as mainland departments via ferry or fire boat (such as Sayville Fire Department) in case of large fires, as happened in March 2015 when a fire destroyed several commercial properties in the business district.

=== Health care ===
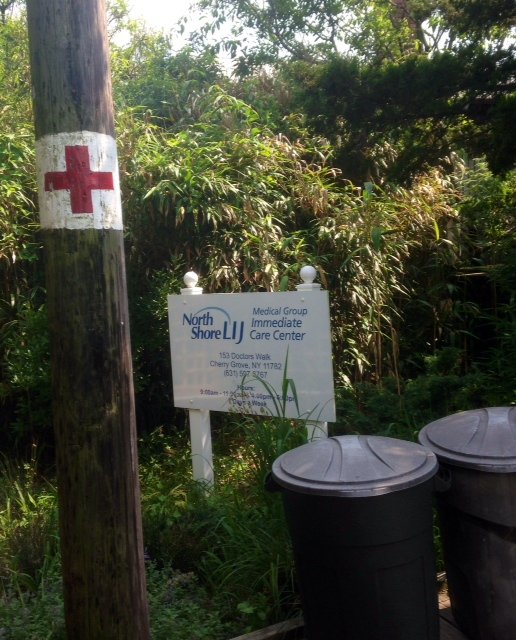
Northwell Urgent Care on Fire Island (Locations in Ocean Beach and Cherry Grove)

Northwell Health operates two urgent care facilities on Fire Island (one in Cherry Grove and the other in nearby Ocean Beach). These centers operate during the summer from Memorial Day through Labor Day, and are open for walk-in patient visits seven days a week from 9 to 11 a.m. and 4 to 6 pm. If patients require medical treatment outside of those hours, the Immediate Care Center's physician can be reached on call by contacting local police.

Good Samaritan Hospital, South Shore University Hospital, and Long Island Community Hospital are located across the Great South Bay from Fire Island in the Long Island hamlets of West Islip, Bay Shore, and East Patchogue, respectively. A heliport for medevac helicopter use is adjacent to Good Samaritan Hospital. Specially equipped boats provided by the Suffolk County Police Department Marine Bureau docked at the various communities on Fire Island provide emergency transportation to individuals in need of dire medical care. In many cases, Long Island based ambulances will meet the boats once they cross the Bay (roughly 4.5 miles) and then drive individuals the short distance to one of the three hospitals. Also, one emergency access road connects Long Island (West Islip) to Fire Island (Kismet). However, the road ends there and does not extend the full length of the island into the other communities.

== See also ==
- Dancer from the Dance

== Further reading (most recent first) ==
- McShane, Julianne (July 1, 2021). "Cherry Grove, Where Gay New Yorkers Became 'Their Real Selves'". The New York Times.
- Brett Beemyn (ed.), Creating a Place For Ourselves: Lesbian, Gay, and Bisexual Community Histories. Routledge, 2013. ISBN 9781135222406.
- Marc Lallanilla, Neil Edward Schlecht, and Brian Silverman, Frommer's New York State, Edition 5, unabridged, pp. 164–169. John Wiley & Sons, 2011. ISBN 9781118204290.
- Esther Newton, Cherry Grove, Fire Island: Sixty Years in America's First Gay and Lesbian Town. Beacon Press, 1993. On Google Books. ISBN 9780807079270.

Preceded by Fire Island Pines	Beaches of Fire Island	Succeeded by Point O' Woods
