= Budweiser Clydesdales =

Anheuser-Busch promotional horse teams

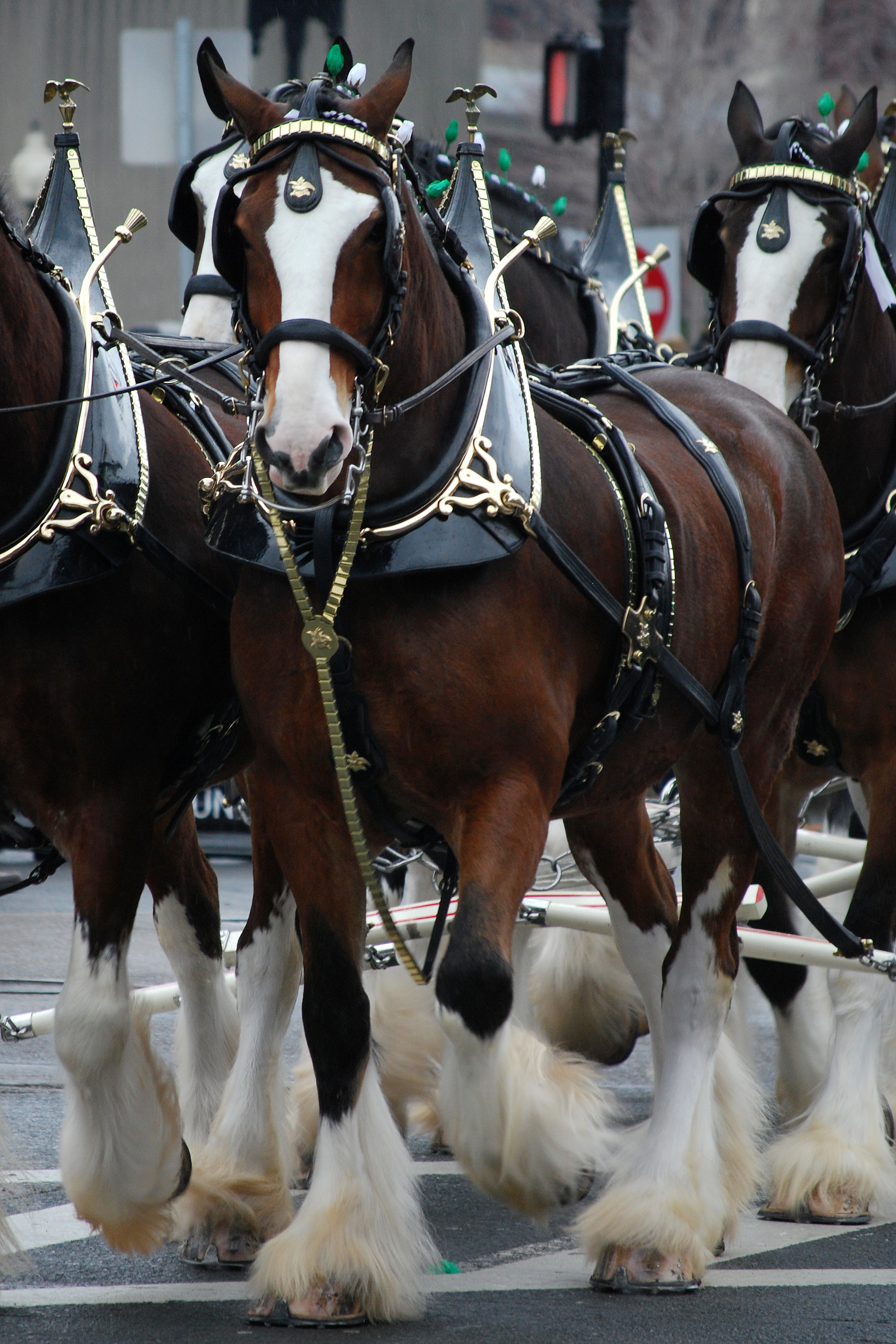
Budweiser Clydesdales, in harness

The Budweiser Clydesdales are a group of Clydesdale horses used for promotions and commercials by the Anheuser-Busch Brewing Company. There are several "hitches" or teams of horses, that travel around the United States and other countries or remain in their official homes at the company headquarters at the Anheuser-Busch brewery complex in St. Louis, Missouri. At St. Louis, they are housed in a historic brick and stained-glass stable built in 1885. There are eight horses driven at any one time, but ten horses are on each team to provide alternates for the hitch when needed. Assorted Clydesdales are also used as animal actors in television commercials for Budweiser beer, particularly in Super Bowl ads.

== Location ==
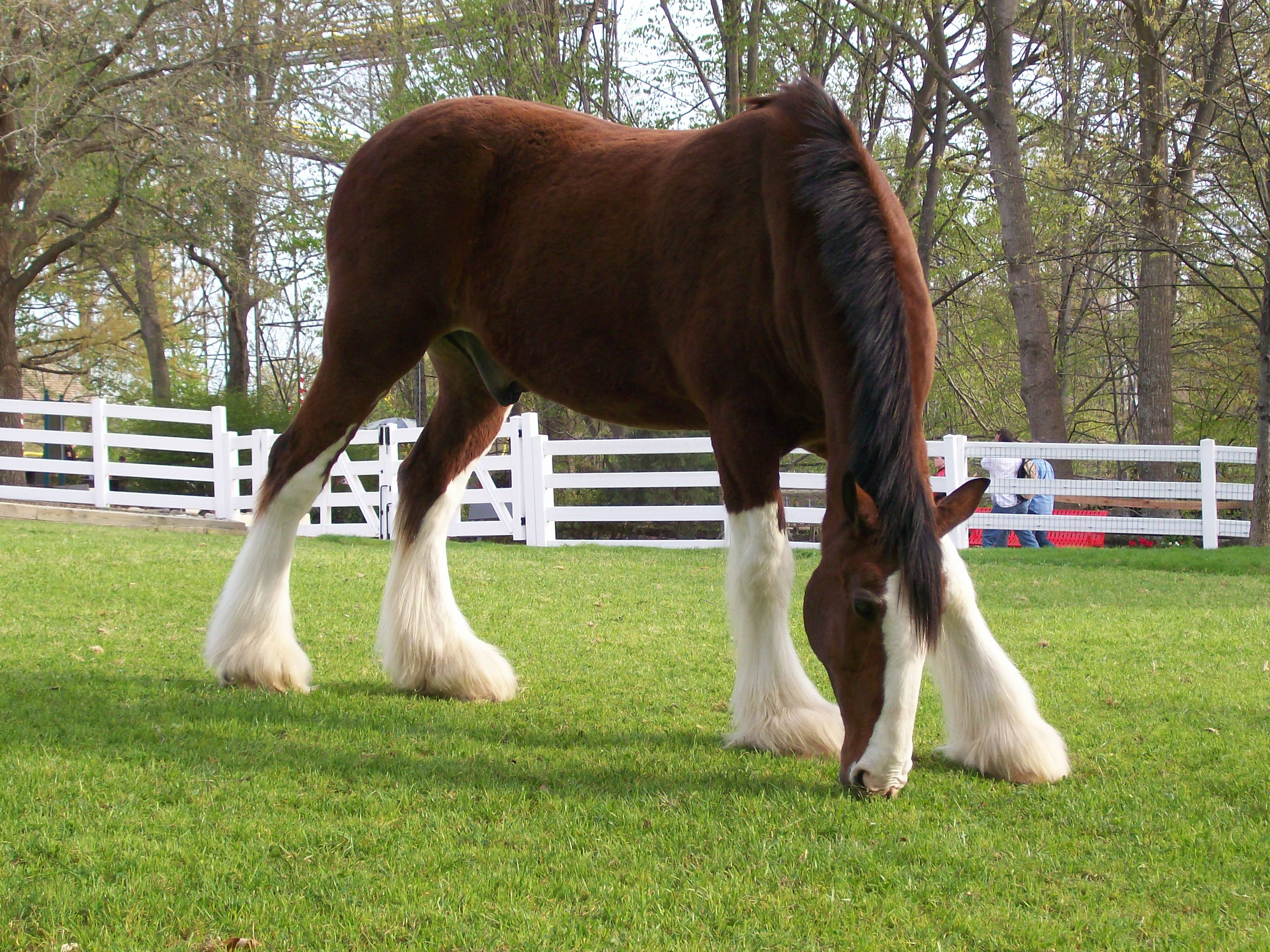
A Clydesdale grazing at Busch Gardens in Williamsburg, Virginia

Many of the Clydesdales owned by Anheuser-Busch are raised at Grant's Farm near St. Louis. The Budweiser Clydesdale Stables at Grant's Farm house approximately 35 mares, stallions and foals, with an average of 15 foals produced each year. Anheuser-Busch owns a total of about 250 Clydesdales, kept at various locations throughout the United States, one of the largest herds of Clydesdale horses in the world.

The largest breeding facility is at Warm Springs Ranch near Boonville, Missouri, which is about 150 miles west of St. Louis. InBev consolidated operations there in 2008. More than half of the company's herd is kept there. The Ranch offers tours of its facilities. Another breeding ranch was near Romoland, California, about 60 miles southeast of Los Angeles, but it was closed.

The three Clydesdale teams that tour internationally are based near the company's brewing facilities in St. Louis, Fort Collins, Colorado, and Merrimack, New Hampshire. The company also buys high-quality Clydesdales from other sources on occasion.

The Clydesdales were fixtures at Busch Gardens. However, after InBev sold the amusement parks, the link to the Budweiser Clydesdales ended in 2009. The new owners have brought back Clydesdales but they are not the "Budweiser Clydesdales".

== Origins ==
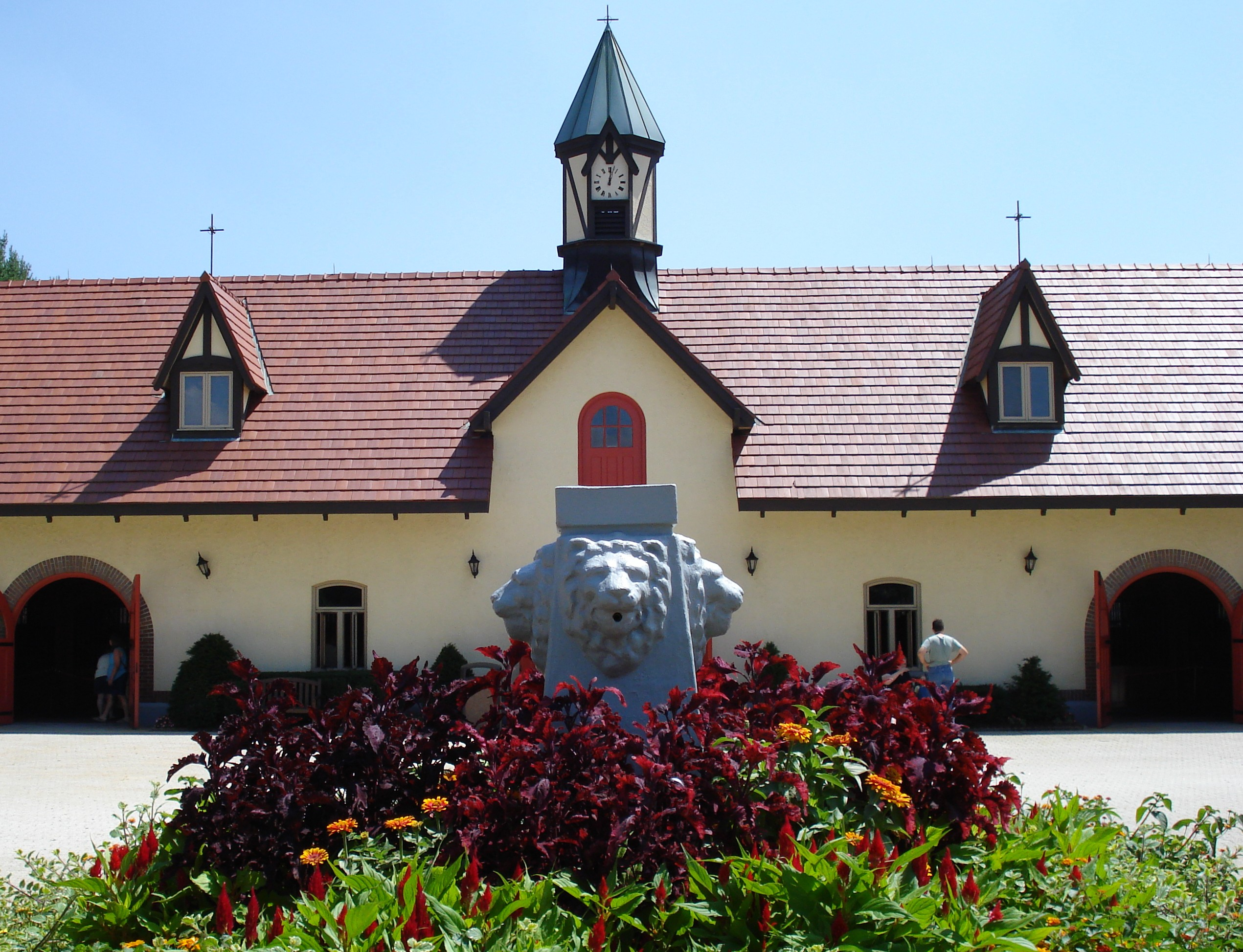
The historic stables in St. Louis, 2007

The original Budweiser Clydesdales were purchased from Patrick Shea, owner of Shea's Brewery in Winnipeg, Manitoba, Canada who had also used them for promoting his brewery. Rebranded for Budweiser, the horses were first introduced to the American public on April 7, 1933, to celebrate the repeal of Prohibition. August A. Busch Jr. presented the hitch as a gift to his father, August Anheuser Busch, Sr., who was guided outside the brewery by the ruse of being told his son had purchased him a new car, but instead was greeted by the horses, pulling a red, white and gold beer wagon. The hitch proceeded to carry the first case of post-Prohibition beer from the St. Louis brewery in a special journey down Pestalozzi Street in St. Louis.

Recognizing the advertising and promotional potential of a horse-drawn beer wagon, Busch, Sr. had the team sent by rail to New York City, where it picked up two cases of Budweiser beer at New Jersey's Newark Airport, and presented it to Al Smith, former governor of New York and an instrumental force in the repeal of Prohibition. From there, the Clydesdales continued on a tour of New England and the Mid-Atlantic States, a journey that included the delivery of a case of beer to President Franklin D. Roosevelt at the White House.

== Qualifications ==
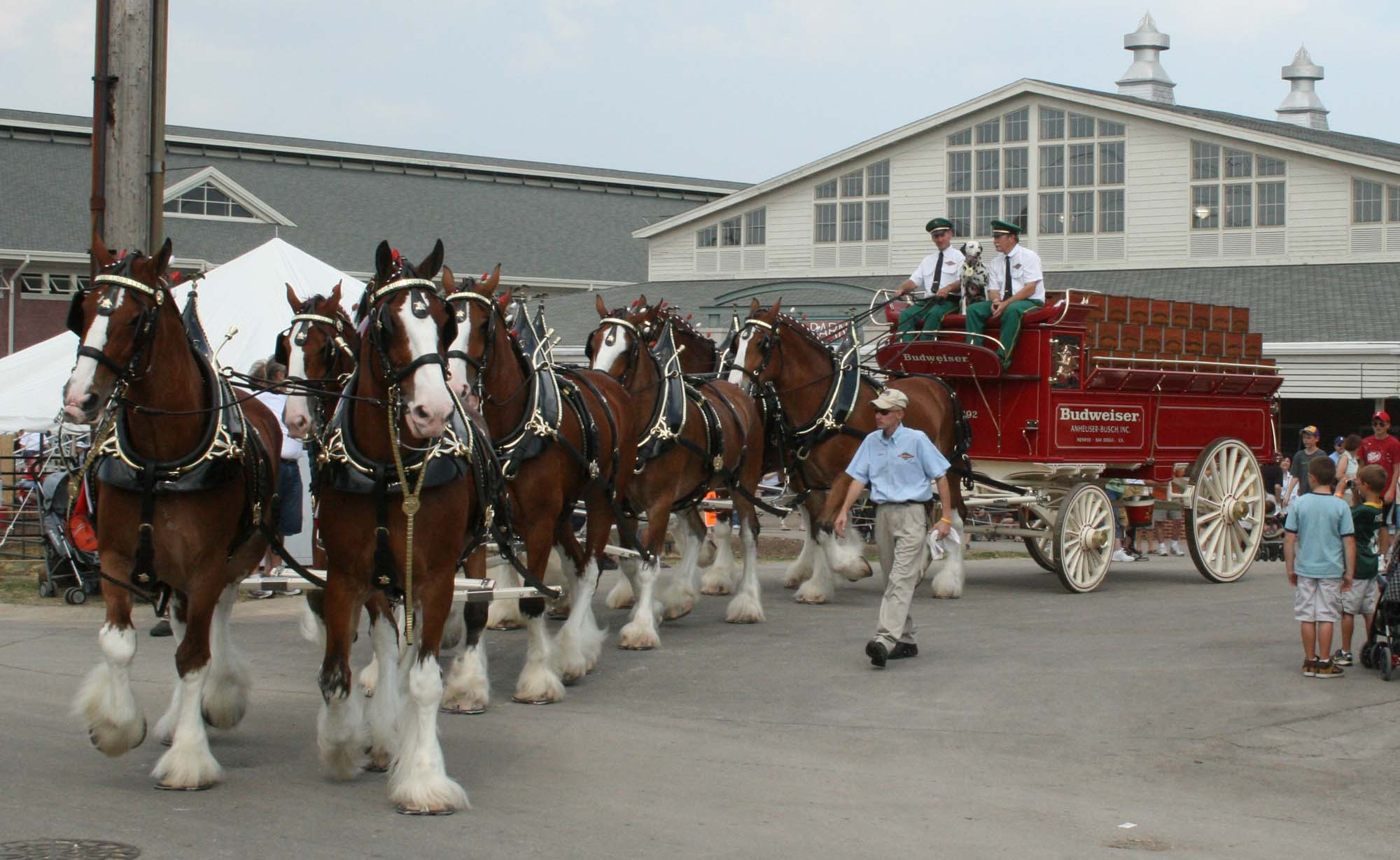
The full hitch, including a seated Dalmatian, at Wisconsin State Fair in 2009

To qualify for one of the hitches, a Budweiser Clydesdale must be a gelding with an even temperament and strong, draft horse appearance, be at least four years old, stand at least 18 hands (72 inches, 183 cm) at the withers when fully mature, and weigh between 1,800 and 2,300 pounds (820 and 1,040 kg). In addition, each horse must be bay in color (a reddish-brown coat with a black mane and tail), have four white stocking feet, and a blaze of white on the face.

== Traveling hitches ==
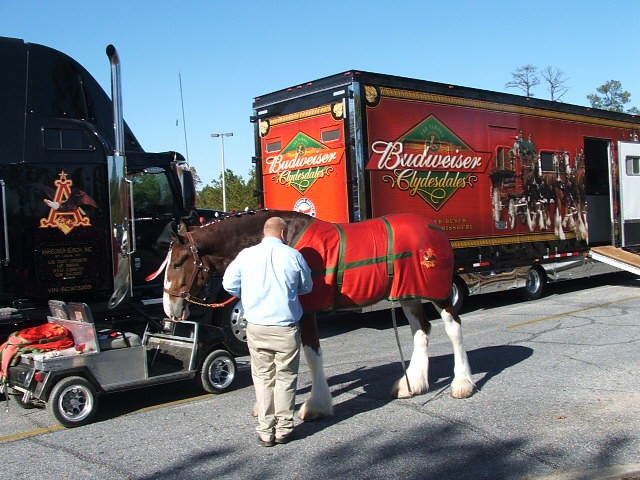
A Clydesdale by one of the semi-trailers used to transport the team

Originally the Clydesdales were transported by train. Cross-country truck transport was introduced in 1940. Today, the traveling hitches are on the road at least 10 months every year, based in St. Louis, Missouri, Merrimack, New Hampshire, and Fort Collins, Colorado. At St. Louis, there are several tours that provide a visit to the Budweiser Clydesdale Paddock and Stables. The first Clydesdale hitch was based in Merrimack, New Hampshire. Horses no longer reside there, but the stables are open for viewing. Fort Collins is the home to the Clydesdales West Coast Team. When the horses are not touring, they can be seen as part of a tour and visitors can have a picture taken with them. There are ten horses that travel on each team. Eight are in harness when performing at any one time and the other two horses provide alternates for the hitch as needed. Several professional handlers accompany each team. Often, one handler has night duty to provide round-the-clock care for the horses. Transportation for each hitch requires three 50-foot semis. Two carry the horses, the third transports a red, white and gold beer wagon and other equipment. The horses' comfort is enhanced with "air-cushioned suspension and thick rubber flooring", and cameras in the trailers enable the drivers to watch the horses during transport. The team stops each night at local stables.

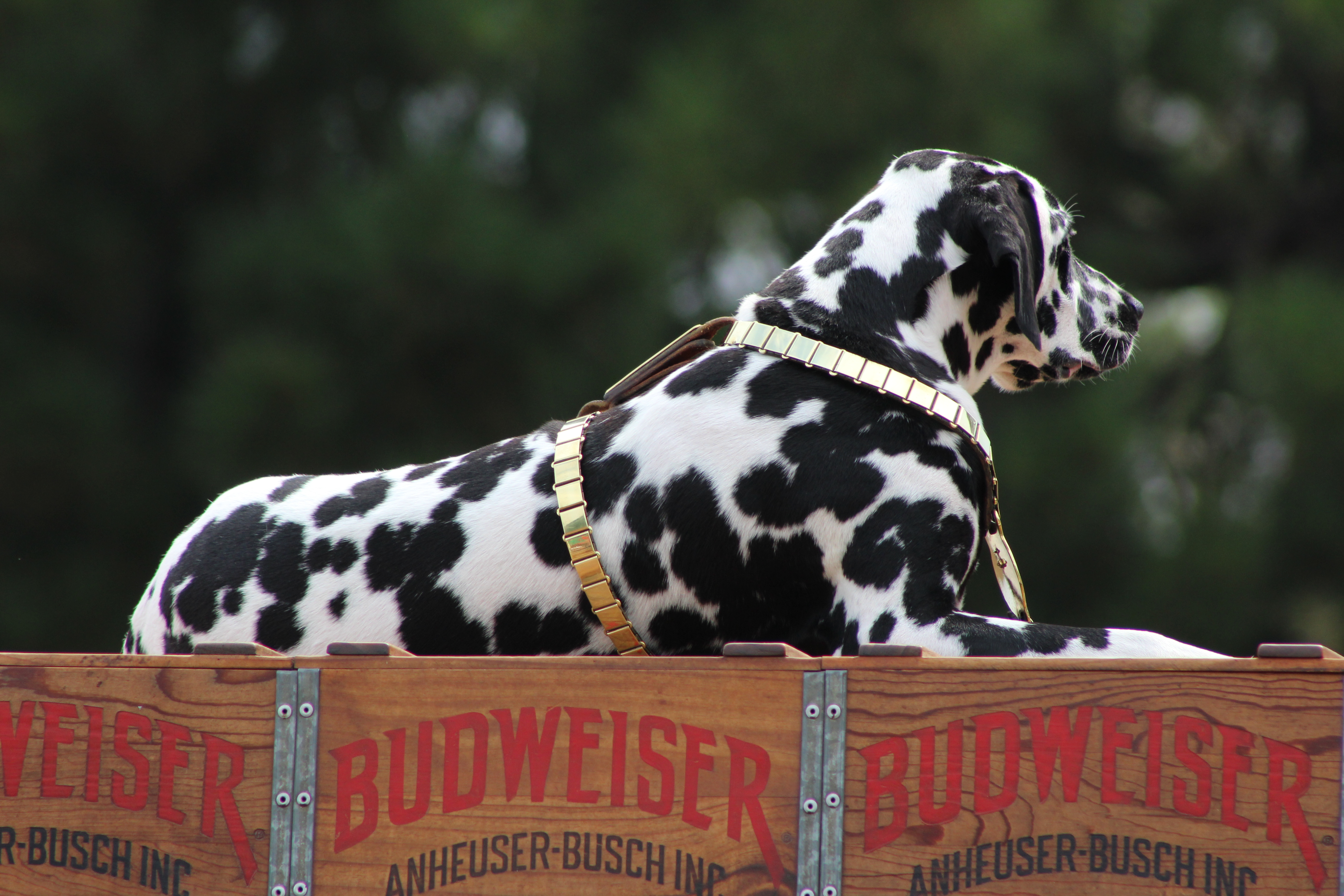
Budweiser Clydesdale Dalmatian

An obedience-trained Dalmatian dog also travels with each hitch, a Budweiser tradition since the 1950s. Historically, the role of the dogs was to guard the wagon and protect the team while the driver went inside buildings to make deliveries. When the team performs today, the Dalmatians sit on the wagon, seated next to the driver. The wagons are Studebaker wagons modified to carry water, originally manufactured c. 1900.

== Super Bowl tradition ==
Television advertising featuring the Budweiser Clydesdales had been a longstanding Super Bowl tradition, beginning with an ad during Super Bowl XX in 1986. In 2010, the new parent company, Anheuser-Busch InBev, announced that there would not be a Clydesdales ad aired during the 2010 Super Bowl. However, the company reversed its position after asking fans to vote on Facebook whether to include the horses in an ad, compared against two other potential spots. As a result, the company aired a Clydesdale-focused ad during the fourth quarter, one of nine ads aired by the company during the game.

== Rose Parade ==
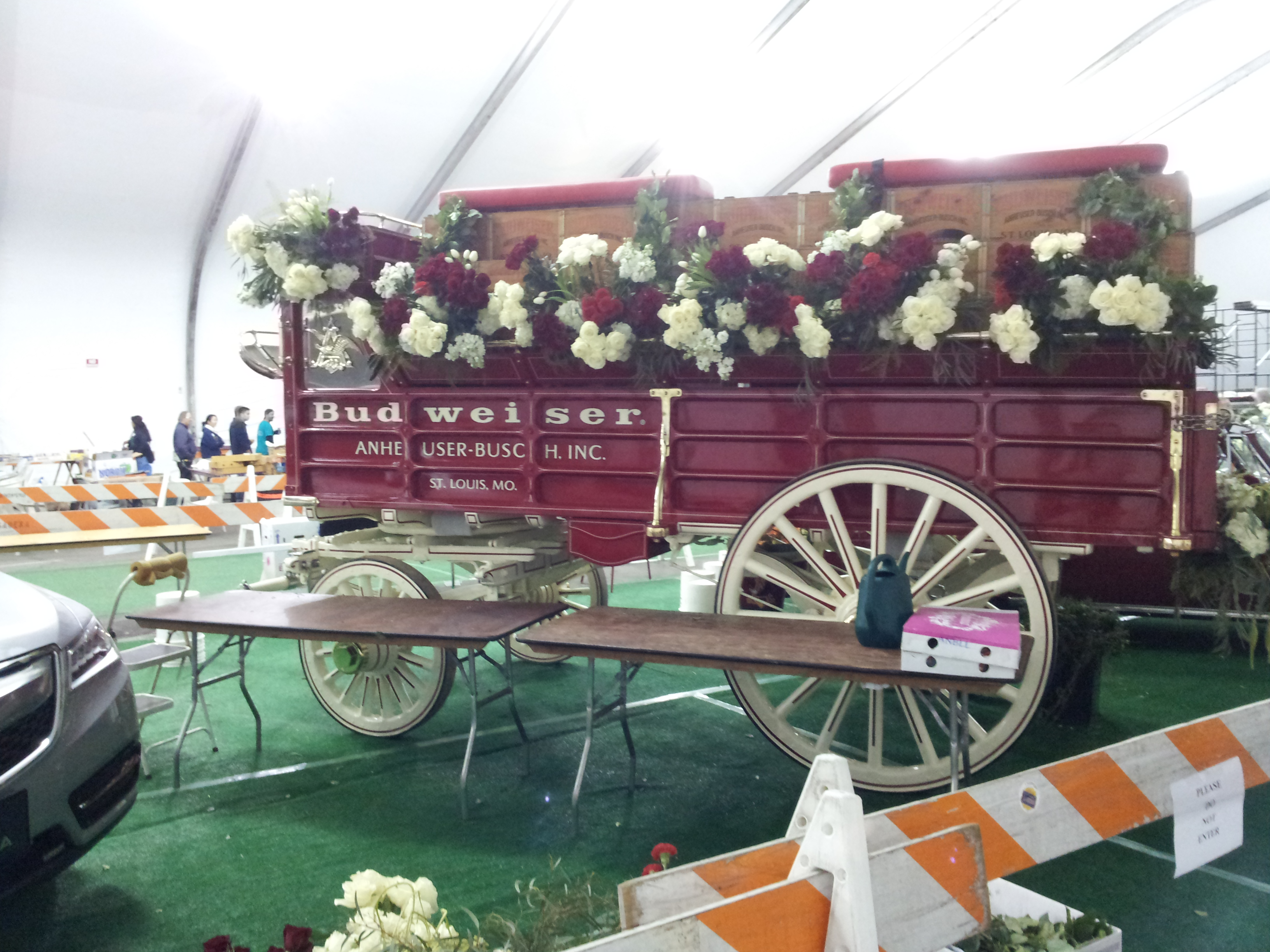
AB Beer Wagon, partially decorated in Brookside Pavilion, for 2014 Rose Parade

A hitch of Clydesdales pulled the City of St. Louis' float, co-sponsored by Budweiser, in the Tournament of Roses Parade from 1954 to 2011. In 2014 the Clydesdales returned to the Rose Parade, this time pulling their beer wagon. The President of the Tournament of Roses rode on the beer wagon instead of the usual classic car.

== Tail docking ==
In early 2023, PETA accused Anheuser-Busch of disfiguring their horses for cosmetic reasons by docking their tails, a partial tailbone amputation which is condemned by the American Association of Equine Practitioners and the American Veterinary Medical Association. By September, Anheuser-Busch announced they had discontinued the practice.
