= Adolphus Busch (disambiguation) =

Adolphus Busch was the founder of Anheuser Busch.

Adolphus Busch may also refer to:

- Adolphus Busch III, grandson of the founder
- Adolphus Busch Hall, a Harvard University building

== See also ==
- Adolf Busch, German-born violinist and composer
- Adolphus Buschbeck, American army commander
