= Boardroom coup =

Sudden ouster of a company's incumbent management

A boardroom coup is a sudden and often unexpected takeover or transfer of power of an organisation or company. The coup is usually performed by an individual or a small group usually from within the corporation in order to seize power. A boardroom coup draws upon the ideas of a coup d'état in the same way that a corrupt, dysfunctional or unpopular group is pushed out of power.

== Examples ==
=== Paramount and DuMont ===
In 1940, Paramount Pictures took control of DuMont after failed attempts to work with other established companies in its field, including CBS, RCA and AT&T. Preceding these failures Paramount decided to obtain stocks in another television company, DuMont. After their purchase Allen DuMont, the owner of DuMont television, began to see his powers within the company flagging as Paramount now owned a large proportion of his company. Paramount with its newfound power proceeded to appoint its own directors amongst DuMont's. The company established their coup by giving crucial financial positions to those they had hired, which stopped DuMont from having any financial input into the company and effectively becoming its owners.

=== Anheuser–Busch ===
Following the death of his youngest daughter in a freak car accident in late 1974, the aging Anheuser–Busch CEO Gussie Busch, who had already become unusually wary of spending company money on new projects, was so consumed with grief that he could no longer effectively manage the company's affairs. In May, 1975, his oldest son, August Busch III, put into action a plan he had been working on with executives close to him for several years. The board was persuaded to remove the elder Busch and install his son as CEO. Gussie Busch was allowed to retain some of his company perks and continue running the St. Louis Cardinals, a baseball team that the company owned, but only on the condition that he acknowledge his departure from the company leadership was voluntary. It wasn't until the after the death of Gussie Busch in 1989, that the truth of his removal as CEO was made public.

=== Apple (1985) ===
In 1985, Steve Jobs was stripped of his title as Apple’s chief visionary after a boardroom meeting in which Apple's representatives sided with then-CEO John Sculley. Despite the success of a new advertising campaign release in 1984, there was significant backlog of unsold stock, which was worth millions in revenue. Demand for the products dropped significantly between 1984 and 1985, which led to rising tensions between the CEO and Jobs. In an attempt to raise confidence in the company and his own ability, he launched a new computer, the Turbo Mac. His new piece of technology featured a multitude of different features from previous Mac models including a faster operating system, customised internal parts exclusively for the Turbo and the ability to store data from within.

The project, however, was unsuccessful due to problems in the physical technology of the system. After that failure, with no sign of improvement in profits at the corporation, a boardroom meeting was set up to decide Apple's and, unknowingly to him, Jobs's future as well. No concrete solutions were made, and a few months later, in 1985, Jobs and Sculley had a showdown. Sculley ousted his rival, diminished his former title, and forced Jobs to leave the company.

=== Apple (1997) ===
After Jobs's removal, Apple had been faltering in its market position once again and was being overtaken by the other technological powerhouses. Sculley, in an attempt to save the company, began a search for a buyer. A multitude of companies were offered the corporation, but none accepted. In 1996, Gil Amelio took over the helm at Apple, and with the bad publicity the corporation was receiving, Amelio struggled in reinstating any hope for the future. He was fighting a losing battle for Apple and was considered by many to be worsening its struggle for survival. In June 1997 a meeting was set up with senior board members of Apple. The executives intended to discuss, exactly as had been the case nearly 10 years earlier, the state of the company and of Amelio. However, this time a clear decision was reached and a couple of weeks later Woolard, a member of the Board of Directors, delivered the news to Amelio by telephone that he would no longer be the head of Apple. Jobs, who had been busy after his resignation with his new company, NeXT Inc., was reinstated as interim CEO after Apple bought his business in 1996 and was formally restored to the board in July 1997, just days after Amelio was ousted.

=== General Motors ===
In 1990, Robert Stempel was appointed as CEO of General Motors, a company that he had worked for since 1962. He had started in its Oldsmobile Division and gradually climbed the various ranks of the company until he was given the position. An economic recession hit the globe in the late 1980s and into the early 1990s which significantly impacted on GM and the automotive industry in general. The pressure to keep the company profitable came upon Stempel. He, alongside the board of directors, looked for ways to cut costs in every division. Particularly, they looked to restructure the makeup of the company so that it would bear the brunt of the recession less forcefully than his rivals. However, in 1992 the board took action against Stempel. With a vote the managing directors, as well as external directors, fired him. They believed that he was responsible for the level of GM's losses, and they also accused him of doing little to return the company to the success they expected.

=== Rangers Football Club ===
In May 2013, an attempt was made to threaten the position of the Rangers Football Club's chairman, Malcolm Murray. The club had gone into liquidation a year before but after an agreement was reached and the club was repurchased, their prospects began to improve and confidence amongst shareholders was raised. Despite a prosperous looking future, a group of these shareholders decided in May to have Murray removed with other senior members of the board. Fans and investors alike were uncertain of the exact financial state of the club since little information had been released since their liquidation. Therefore, tensions rose between the board and shareholders, despite directors trying to assure investors that the club was financially secure. The shareholders, who owned 6.1% of the business, then successfully managed to oust Murray from his position and appointed Walter Smith, a previous manager of the club, in his place.

== Attempt ==
=== Blackberry ===
In 2012 an attempt was made by Robin Chan for a complete overhaul of Blackberry in an attempt to save it. Chan was not an employee of Blackberry but instead a technological entrepreneur who set up his own business, the XPD Media Inc group. After Blackberry's share prices plummeted to $16 in 2012 Chan began to plan a takeover of the company with a team of specialists in finance and technology. His aim was to save the flagging company from having to be sold out or going bankrupt. He created a slideshow, which he named Project BBX to present to the board. Within the slides there were details of Blackberry's current losses in a number of graphs and how he envisaged, with his team, to turn the company around. Some of the changes included completely overhauling Blackberry's operating system and ensuring the phone's security system was the best available to buy. In the end, the board's opposition to major changes, coupled with his lack of funding due to the size of his project, meant that Chan was never able to succeed in Project BBX, and his boardroom coup failed.

== See also ==
- Coup d'état
- Takeover
- Buyout
- Workplace politics
