= Dave Peacock (businessman) =

American businessman (born 1968)

- Born: May 26, 1968 (age 58); Webster Groves, Missouri, United States
- Education: University of Kansas; Washington University in St. Louis
- Employer: Advantage Solutions
- Title: CEO
- Term: 2023-

Dave Peacock (born May 26, 1968) is the chief executive officer of Advantage Solutions. He is the former president of the Anheuser-Busch InBev subsidiary, Anheuser-Busch and President of Schnuck Markets in St. Louis. He also was COO of Continental Grain.

== Career ==
He earned his undergraduate degree in journalism (advertising) from the William Allen White School of Journalism and Mass Communications at the University of Kansas in 1990 and an MBA from the Olin Business School at Washington University in St. Louis.

He succeeded August Busch IV as president of Anheuser-Busch in 2008 after the acquisition of Anheuser-Busch was completed by InBev on November 18, 2008. He stepped down as Anheuser-Busch president in 2012.

He formerly is owner of Vitaligent, LLC, the largest Jamba Juice franchisee with stores in California, Washington and Missouri. He is on the board of directors of Stifel Corp and Wayne Sanderson Farms. He was chairman of the St. Louis Sports Commission from 2012 through 2017.

In the fall of 2014, he was tasked by Missouri Governor Jay Nixon to lead an effort to keep the St. Louis Rams, a team in the National Football League, that was based in St. Louis at the time in anticipation of owner Stan Kroenke's plans to build a football stadium in Inglewood, California. On January 9, 2015, he produced a plan to build an open-air stadium on the north side of downtown St. Louis he also led the stadium effort (along with Bob Blitz) until the Rams moved back to Los Angeles in 2016. This project ultimately resulted in a settlement between the NFL and the St Louis region for $790 million paid to the region. Peacock also helped organize a group to secure an MLS expansion franchise in 2016–2017.

In May 2017, Peacock was appointed president and chief operating officer of Schnuck Markets, a grocery chain operating in five states headquartered in St Louis. The same year, he also joined the board of directors for Stifel Corp, a leading brokerage and investment bank.

Peacock stepped down from Schnucks in the Fall of 2021 to join as Chief Operating Officer for Continental Grain, a company invested in food and agribusiness located in New York. On January 18, 2023, Peacock was announced as chief executive officer for Advantage Solutions, a St. Louis-based business solutions provider serving retailers and consumer packaged goods companies.

Peacock has become involved in the St. Louis startup scene. He is an investor in Lockerdome - now called Decide.
