= Mounted corkscrew =

Mounted device to remove corks from bottles

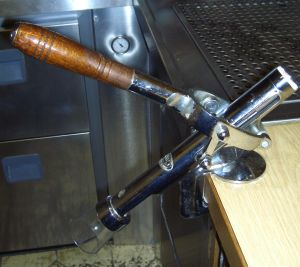
A mounted corkscrew

A mounted or bar corkscrew is a device screwed or clamped to a wall or counter top, used to draw corks from beer, wine or other bottles.

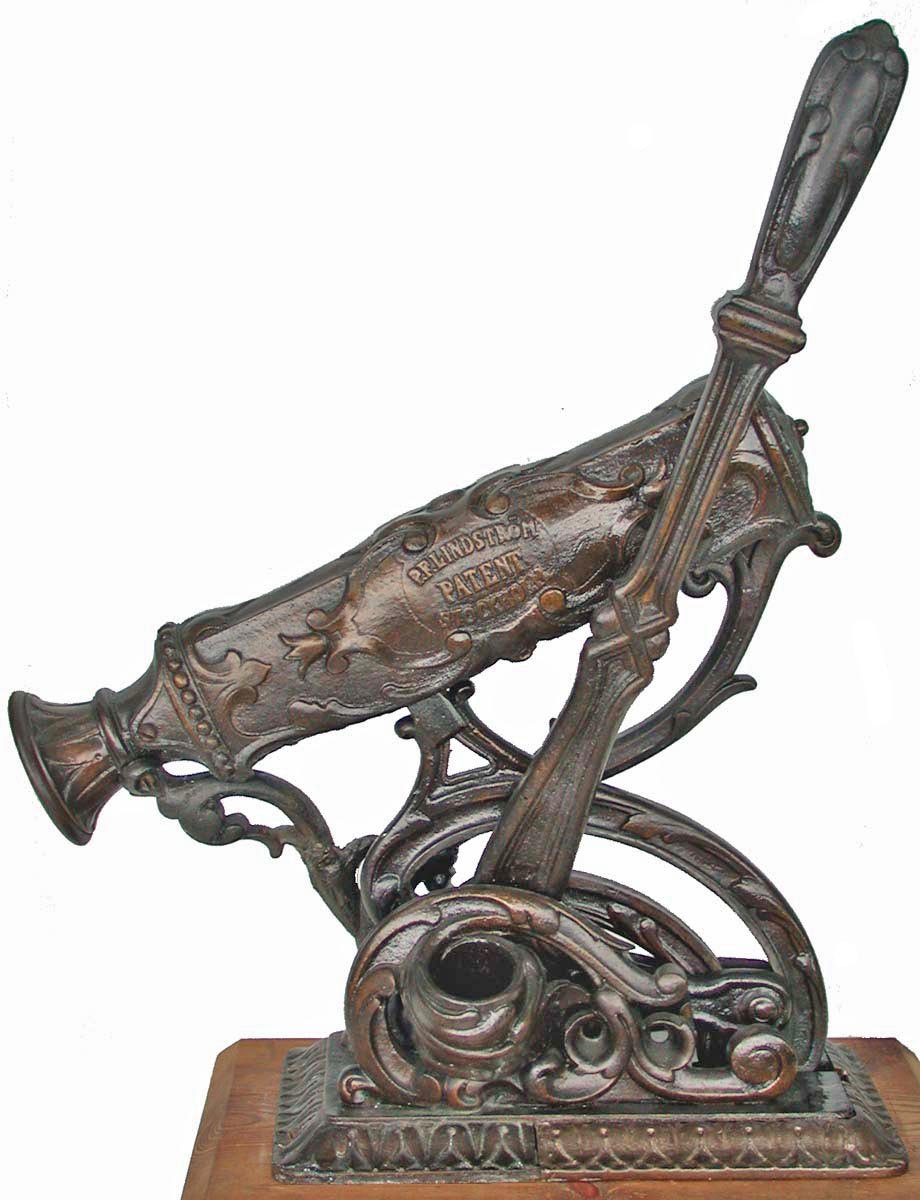
1870 Lindstrom patent from Sweden

== History ==
Corks have been used to seal jars and bottles for over 400 years. (Modern, machine made bottles with threaded tops for screw caps date from the 1920s.) Early glass bottles were cumbersome (and possibly dangerous, being hand-blown) to hold, and the simple “T” corkscrew required strength to use. The first mounted corkscrews, made some time in the mid 1800s, were very simple, consisting of a frame incorporating a bracket that held the bottle down and a metal hook that pulled almost any “T” handled corkscrew up. The helix or worm was turned into the cork, then the bottle was held with the protruding corkscrew in the frame, with the lever hooked onto it. Pulling the lever extracted the cork. The mechanical advantage incorporated into these frames consisted of various types of rack and pinion, gear or lever mechanisms.

Turning the worm into the cork and then turning the cork off the worm was a time-consuming process. Eventually, the popularity of bottled beer stopped with corks would necessitate the invention of a faster, simpler method of removing the corks.

== Mechanical mounted corkscrews ==
The first mounted mechanical corkscrews are known as “coffee grinder” or “crank and pump” types. Introduced in the late 1800s, this invention combined the corkscrew and mechanical advantage in one device. In most examples the worm was attached to a stem, with a crank, inserted through a frame with a lever. In most examples the worm was cranked into the cork, and then a lever was pressed or pulled to extract the cork. Then, the cork was held by hand, and the crank operated in reverse, turning it off the worm. For the most part, this style of corkscrew was confined to the home consumer market. John Bloeser of St. Louis, Missouri patented a floor-stand model of the crank and pump in 1886.

== Automatic bar corkscrews ==
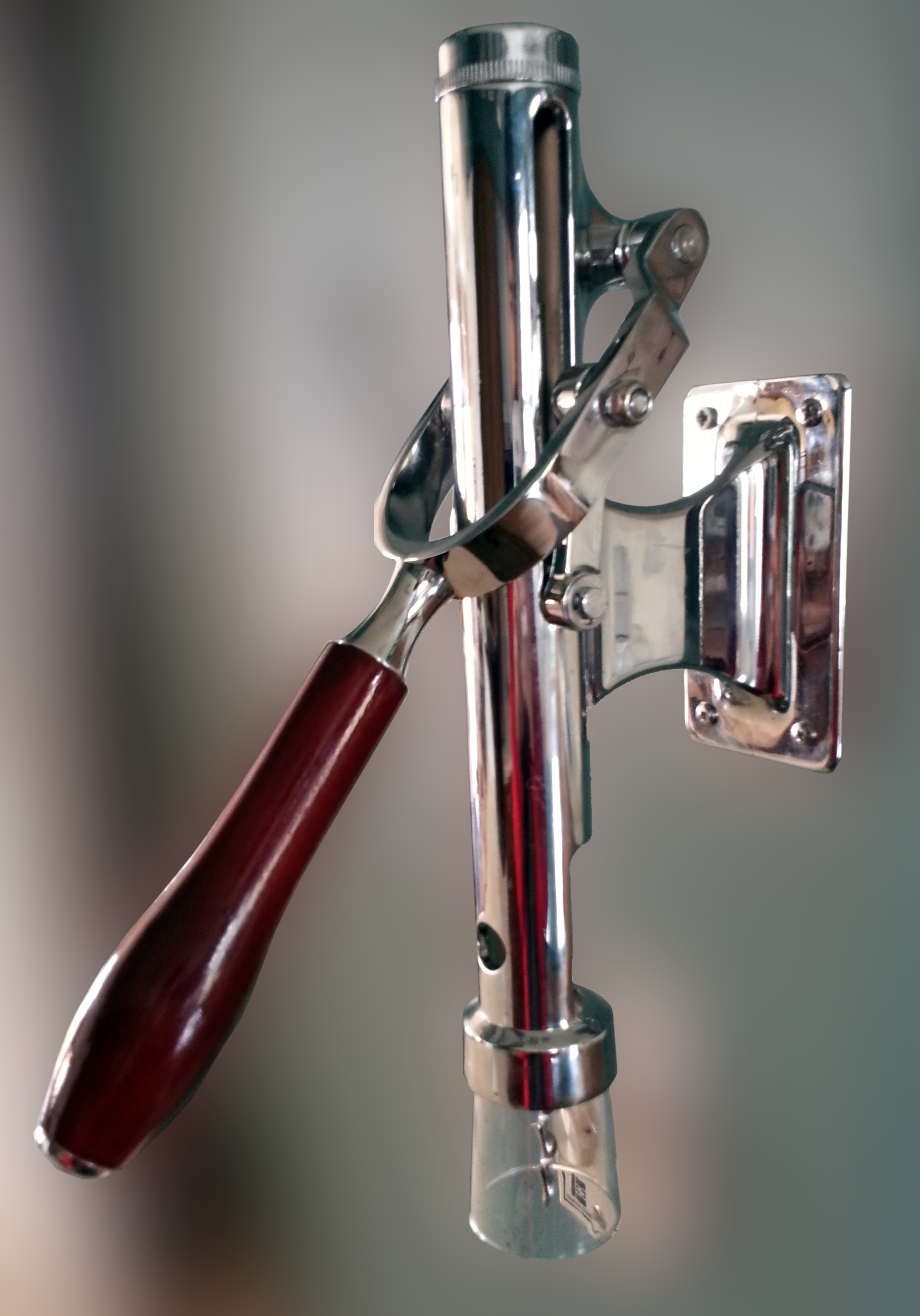
A wall-mounted corkscrew.

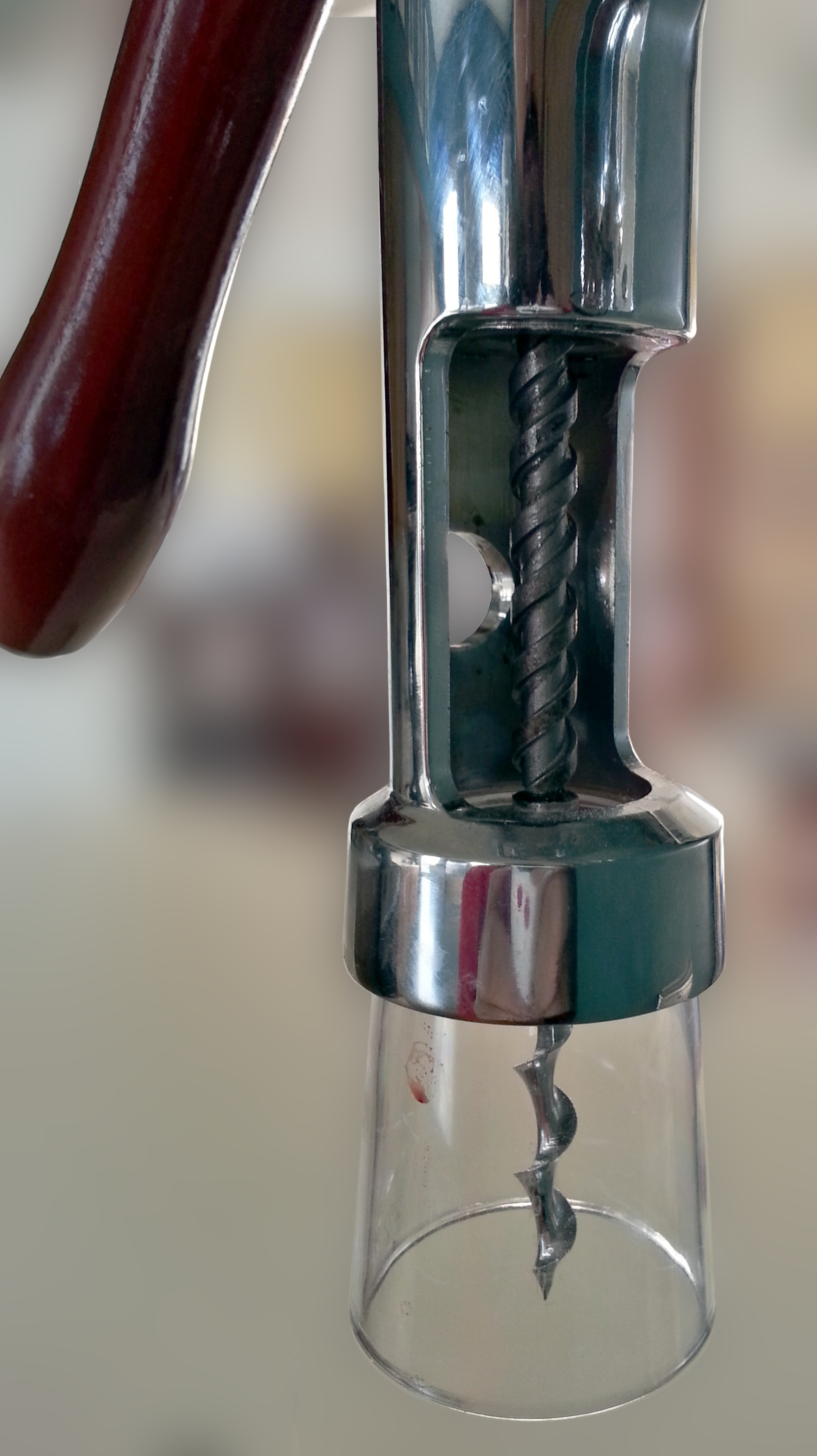
The screw enters the cork below. When the lever is lifted, the screw is pulled directly up, and then unscrewed from the cork. The freed cork falls out of the hole on the side.

Until many years after the invention in 1892 of crown corks, beer bottles were stopped with corks. The increasing popularity of bottled beer created a need for a faster corkscrew. This led to the invention of a variety of “automatic” corkscrew mechanisms patented in the late 1800s and early 1900s in the United States, England and several European countries.

In 1865, Henry John Sanders of England patented a machine that would hold the bottle, turn the worm into the cork, remove the cork and release it “by one up-and-down motion of a lever or treadle, or by turning a handle or cam.” No example of this invention is known to exist. The first automatic mounted corkscrew still in existence (two are known) was patented in 1870 by P.F. Lindstrom of Stockholm, Sweden. Weighing over thirty pounds (14 kg), with 144 different components, it was not commercially viable.

== Mounting methods ==
Mounted corkscrews were originally screwed to a wall (wall mount), clamped to a counter (clamp mount), or screwed to a counter top (top mount). In recent years, some have been adapted to operate from floor stands.

== Mechanisms: Stem nut and worm nut ==
The challenge for inventors of automatic corkscrews was to devise a method of turning the worm in both directions, while preventing it from turning during the cork extraction phase of the operation. There are only two practical mechanisms that have been manufactured to cause the worm to turn in an automatic bar corkscrew.

=== Stem Nut ===
A stem is fastened to the worm and causes the stem to turn by attaching a gear, rack or stem carrier to the threading of the stem and pushing it through a stem-nut. This is the method used by Sanders in his 1865 patent.

=== Worm Nut ===
The worm is pushed or pulled through a worm nut, causing it to rotate. The first patent for a worm nut was awarded to an American inventor M. Redlinger in 1893.

== Patents ==
A vast number of utility and design patents were registered for mechanical and automatic mounted and bar corkscrews. These were manufactured in many countries, but mostly in the United States. Arcade Manufacturing Co. of Freeport, Illinois held forty-five different patents, from R. Gilchrist’s “Lightning” and #384,839 (both 1888) to C. Morgan’s “Pix” (1913). Next came Edwin Walker’s Erie Specialty Co. with sixteen different patents, including three crank and pump variations.

== Manufacturers and distributors ==
American, German and French bar corkscrews were made of cast iron, often plated with nickel. The British favoured brass, as did the Spanish.

- United States: Manufacturers clustered in Freeport, Illinois (Arcade Manufacturing Co., Freeport Novelty Co., Stover Mfg. Co.) Meriden, Connecticut (Bradley & Hubbard Mfg. Co., Landers, Frary & Clark, Manning, Bowman & Co., Meriden Malleable Iron Co.) and Erie, Pennsylvania (Erie Specialty Co., E. Walker Tool Co., F.F. Adams Co., Lovell MFG. Co. Ltd.); others of note were Gilchrist Mfg. Co and Albert Pick & Co. in Chicago, Enterprise Mfg. Co. in Philadelphia and Scoville Mfg. Co. in Waterbury.
- England: Gaskell & Chambers Ltd. in Dale End; Farrow & Jackson Ltd. in London; W.R. Loftus Ltd. in London; Parnall & Sons in Bristol; Samuel Mason Ltd. in Dale End; Merritt & Chambers in Dale End.
- Ireland: Box & Coy in Dublin; W.G. Edmonds & Co. in Dublin.
- France: d’Acier Poli, in Vieux Moulin; Barraud & Lerenard in Paris; Camion Frêres in Vivier; Markt & Co. in Paris; E. Martenet; Wintenberger.
- Belgium: Maison Ruben in Brussels.
- Germany: Alexanderwerk in Essen; Drehteile und Korkenzieher in Steinbacht; Erste Mainzer Metalkapsel-Fabrik in Mainz; Frings & Co. o. H. G. in Hurth; Helmut Gebel in Berlin; Paul Hammerschmidt in Remscheid.
- Spain: B. Olaneta Juaristi, S. A. in Eibar; JUMA in Gijon; Perez-Quintanilla in Gijon, F.R. Sucesores in Gijon.
- Sweden: Eskilstuna Järnmanufaktur Aktiebolag in Eskilstuna.
- Switzerland: ELVAmac SA in Denges.
- United Arab Emirates: BarPros, Bespoke Trading LLC, 22nd Street, Al Quoz Industrial Area 3, Dubai.

== Advertising and Names ==
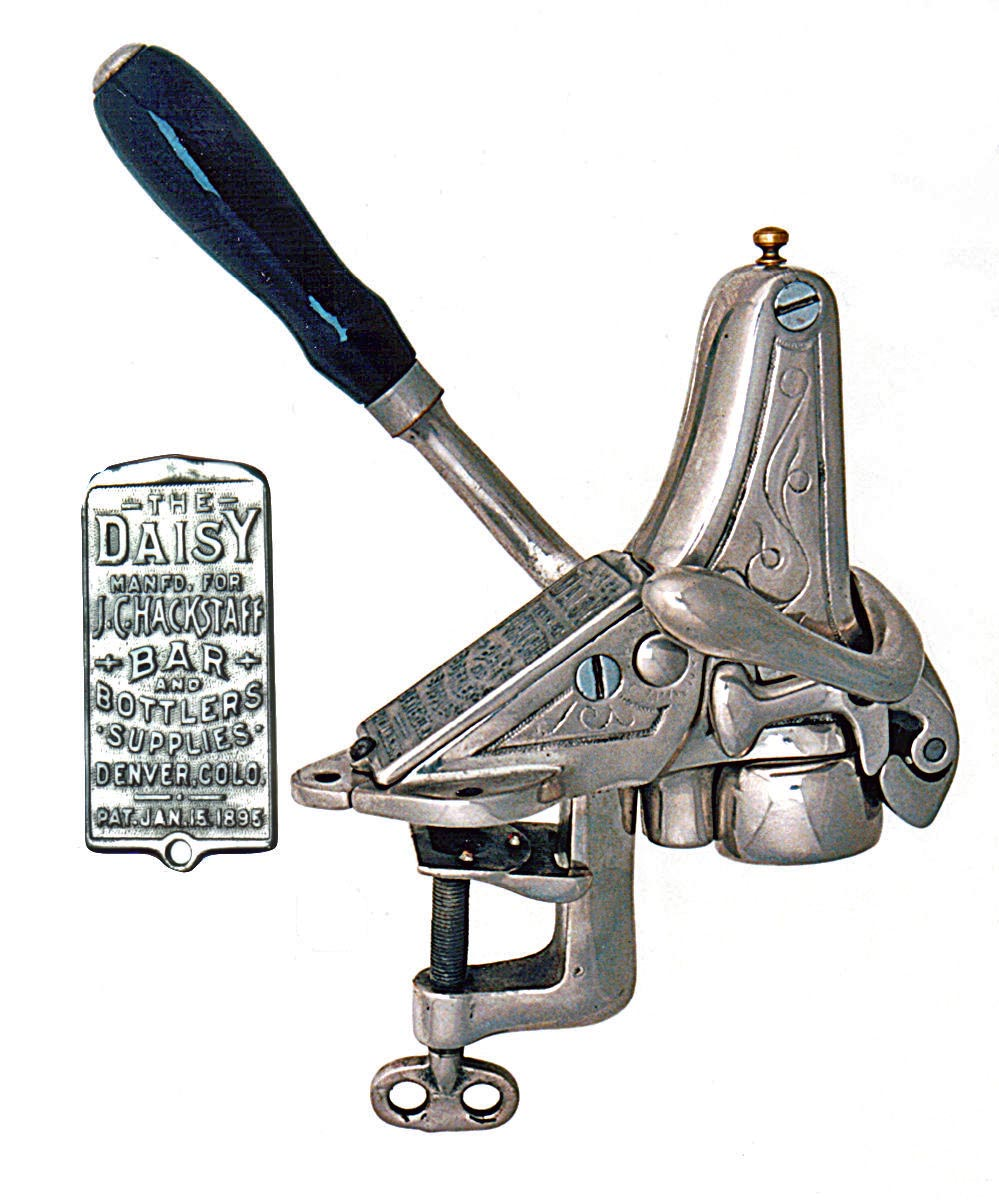
Daisy corkscrew with plate advertising J.C. Hackstaff Bar & Bottlers

Because the bar corkscrews were mounted on counters in full view of customers, they offered a point of sale advertisement for breweries, such as Anheuser-Busch, and cigar makers who affixed private label advertising plates to them.

Like the marketing departments of the auto makers who followed them, the bar corkscrew sales gurus came up with model names to appeal to customers. Some gave an indication of function (Extractee, Pullmee, Yankee), some of size (Midget, Little Giant, Jumbo) some of strength (Champion, Hero, Invincible, Titan), some of how slickly they worked (Quick & Easy, Simple, Express, Safety, Perfect, Presto, Little Quicker, Schnell, Swift) and some of class (Ritz, Luxury, L’Élégant). Some were named in a spirit of celebration (New Century, Jubilee, Triumph, Victor).

== Literature ==
- Ellis, Frank and Barbara Ellis (2007). Corkscrews: British Registered Designs. Bedfordshire: Cod Beck Publishing. ISBN 978-0-9555264-0-4.
- Meadows, Wayne (2001). The Compendium of Bar Corkscrews. Vancouver: Kitsilano Cellars. ISBN 0-9689294-0-0.
- O’Leary, Fred (1996). Corkscrews (1000 Patented Ways to Open a Bottle). Atglen: Schiffer. ISBN 0-7643-0018-0.
- Olive, Guy (1995). Tire-Bouchons Français Brevets 1828 - 1974. France.
- Peters, Ferd. (1999). Mechanical Corkscrews. Heel: Beheermy Pintex B.V. ISBN 90-805058-1-1.
- Wallis, Fletcher (1997). British Corkscrew Patents from 1795. Brighton: Vernier Press. ISBN 1-898825-05X.
