= National Car Rental Field =

Proposed stadium in St. Louis, Missouri

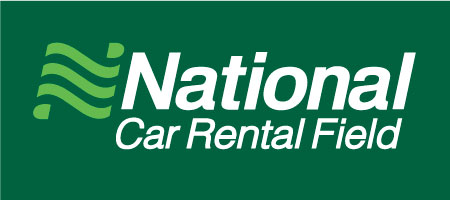
- Interactive map of National Car Rental Field
- Location: St. Louis, Missouri, U.S.
- Coordinates: 38.638865°N 90.181956°W
- Owner: St. Louis Regional Sports Authority
- Capacity: 62,110 (expandable to 72,000 for Super Bowls and other events)
- Executive suites: 113
- Public transit: MetroBus

Construction
- Cost: $1.1 billion
- Architect: HOK
- Project managers: Clayco, Hunt Construction Group, Kai and Legacy Building Group (HCKL)

National Car Rental Field was a proposed multipurpose stadium in St. Louis, Missouri. It was proposed to become the home of St. Louis Rams of the National Football League (NFL) before their move back to the Greater Los Angeles Area to play at SoFi Stadium in Inglewood, California was announced. The stadium cost was estimated at $1.1 billion.

== Background ==
When the Rams moved from Los Angeles to St. Louis in 1995, the contract stated that The Dome at America's Center had to be a "top tier" stadium by 2015, or the Rams had the option to stop leasing the stadium. When this requirement was not met, the city and the team both proposed renovations to the 20-year-old building. In 2012, the two sides went to arbitration, which sided with the Rams. On January 5, 2015, the Rams owner, Stan Kroenke announced a $1.86 billion stadium in Inglewood, California.

== Original proposal ==
On January 9, 2015, former President of Anheuser-Busch Dave Peacock and Bob Blitz announced a $985 million open-air football stadium on the St. Louis riverfront. The stadium would've had an NFL team (either the Rams or another team) and soccer pitch that would meet FIFA and CONCACAF regulations. The stadium task force presented the proposal to the Committee on Los Angeles Opportunities in April. MLS commissioner Don Garber also met with the taskforce, and claimed that the stadium's multi-use potential was “very attractive for us.”

This initial proposal called for the stadium to be paid for by a combination of $250 million from Rams, a $200 million loan from the NFL, $130 million from personal seat license sales, $55 million in tax credits and other public incentives, $350 million from extending the state bonds originally issued for the construction of the Edward Jones Dome.

== Lawsuits ==
=== Regional Convention and Sports Complex Authority v. City of St. Louis ===
A lawsuit was filed on April 10, 2015, by the St. Louis Regional Convention and Sports Complex Authority, which operates the Edward Jones Dome. The RSA sued the city of St. Louis to overturn a city ordinance approved by the voters in 2002, requiring all new stadium financing to be approved by the voters.

On August 3, St. Louis Circuit Judge Thomas Frawley ruled in favor of the RSA, voiding the 2002 city ordinance and allowing the stadium to proceed without a public vote.

=== Schaaf v. Nixon ===
A separate lawsuit was filed on May 27, 2015, by on behalf of Missouri taxpayers by six state senators, led by Senator Robert Schaaf against governor Jay Nixon and the RSA calling the financing plan "illegal". At issue was whether the governor had the legal authority to extend the original bonds without either a public vote or the approval of the legislature.

On August 14, Nixon was dismissed from the lawsuit, although the judge allowed the case to proceed with the RSA as defendant. Stadium backers claimed a victory, but Schaaf said he would continue to fight the plan.

== Revised proposal ==
In July 2015, the estimated cost was increased from $985 to $998 million.

On October 6, 2015, it was announced that National Car Rental (a Clayton, Missouri based company and subsidiary of St. Louis-based Enterprise Holdings) had signed a 20-year, $158 million naming rights deal, giving the stadium the National Car Rental Field name.

On October 13, 2015, the stadium task force presented its term sheet to the NFL. The NFL expressed concern over the proposed funding for the stadium, which included an additional $100 million from the league above its regular maximum contribution. In a letter to the Stadium Task Force, NFL Commissioner Roger Goodell called the financing "fundamentally inconsistent with the NFL's program of stadium financing". He reminded the Task Force that any funds over $200 million had to first be requested and then approved by a three-quarters vote of NFL owners before those additional funds could be included in a stadium proposal, and that neither had been done.

On December 10, 2015, the Ways and Means Committee approved the bill for the stadium 7-2. That same day, Missouri Senator Rob Schaaf went on Los Angeles radio to insist that the legislature would not honor bonds issued for the stadium's construction. He claimed there were majorities in both the state House and Senate who would refuse to pay the bonds when due, and that he had explained this to a representative of the NFL.

On December 16, 2015, the Board of Estimate and Apportionment approved the stadium bill 2-1. Two days later, the Board of Aldermen approved the financing package of the stadium.

== Final proposal and decision ==
On December 29, 2015, the task force presented the nearly 400-page stadium proposal document to the NFL before the December 30 deadline which included a financial term sheet, the approved St. Louis city ordinance and financing plan, detailed descriptions of the state tax credits to be used, plus architectural designs, support letters, market information, and a land acquisition update. The proposal sought $100 million more from the NFL than the standard $200 million provided by the league. Commissioner Goodell notified the task force by letter several weeks earlier that the additional funding from the league could not be guaranteed.

On January 4, 2016, the Rams officially filed their request to the league for relocation to Greater Los Angeles Area, which required a 2/3 majority vote from the other owners. As part of the relocation request, the Rams rejected using National Car Rental Field.

On January 9, the NFL distributed a report to team owners calling the St. Louis stadium plan "unsatisfactory and inadequate" to keep the Rams in St. Louis.

The NFL approved the Rams' Inglewood proposal with a 30-2 vote by the owners on January 12, 2016. Following the vote, Houston Texans owner Bob McNair expressed some concern with the proposed funding for National Car Rental Field, and that requiring the extra $100 million from the league "certainly did not help their proposal". In that same meeting, the owners voted to allocate an additional $100 million in league financing to the Oakland Raiders and San Diego Chargers, should they have elected to stay in their respective cities. The Chargers elected to join the Rams in Los Angeles to play at SoFi Stadium with the Raiders electing to relocate to Las Vegas to play at Allegiant Stadium.

== Aftermath ==
Following the decision, it was announced that the task force spent $16.2 million on their unsuccessful proposal, which included design fees totaling $10.5 million to HOK. The Missouri House introduced legislation that would tighten reporting requirements for private citizens working on behalf of taxpayers, as lawmakers criticized the governor's decision to proceed without a public vote or legislative approval.

On January 28, 2016, two St. Louis Alderwomen introduced an ordinance, Board Bill 282, to repeal the stadium funding authorization.

On April 12, 2017, it was reported that the City of St. Louis, St. Louis County, and the Regional Convention and Sports Complex Authority filed a 52-page lawsuit against the NFL and all 32 NFL clubs as defendants (including Stan Kroenke) and seeks damages and restitution of profits. On July 12, 2017, the Los Angeles Rams filed three motions seek to: dismiss the case for failure to state a claim, dismiss the case for lack of personal jurisdiction, and appeal to have the case determined through arbitration rather than in front of a St. Louis based jury. On November 24, 2021, after four years of litigation, it was announced that the NFL and the various St. Louis parties had agreed to a $790 million dollar settlement to end the lawsuit.

After exploring the site proposed for National Car Rental Field for a possible MLS Stadium in February 2016, a plot of land next to Union Station in the city's Downtown West neighborhood was ultimately chosen instead and MLS granted St. Louis a team in August 2019 that played their first game in 2023.
