= Adolphus Busch III =

American brewing magnate (1891–1946)

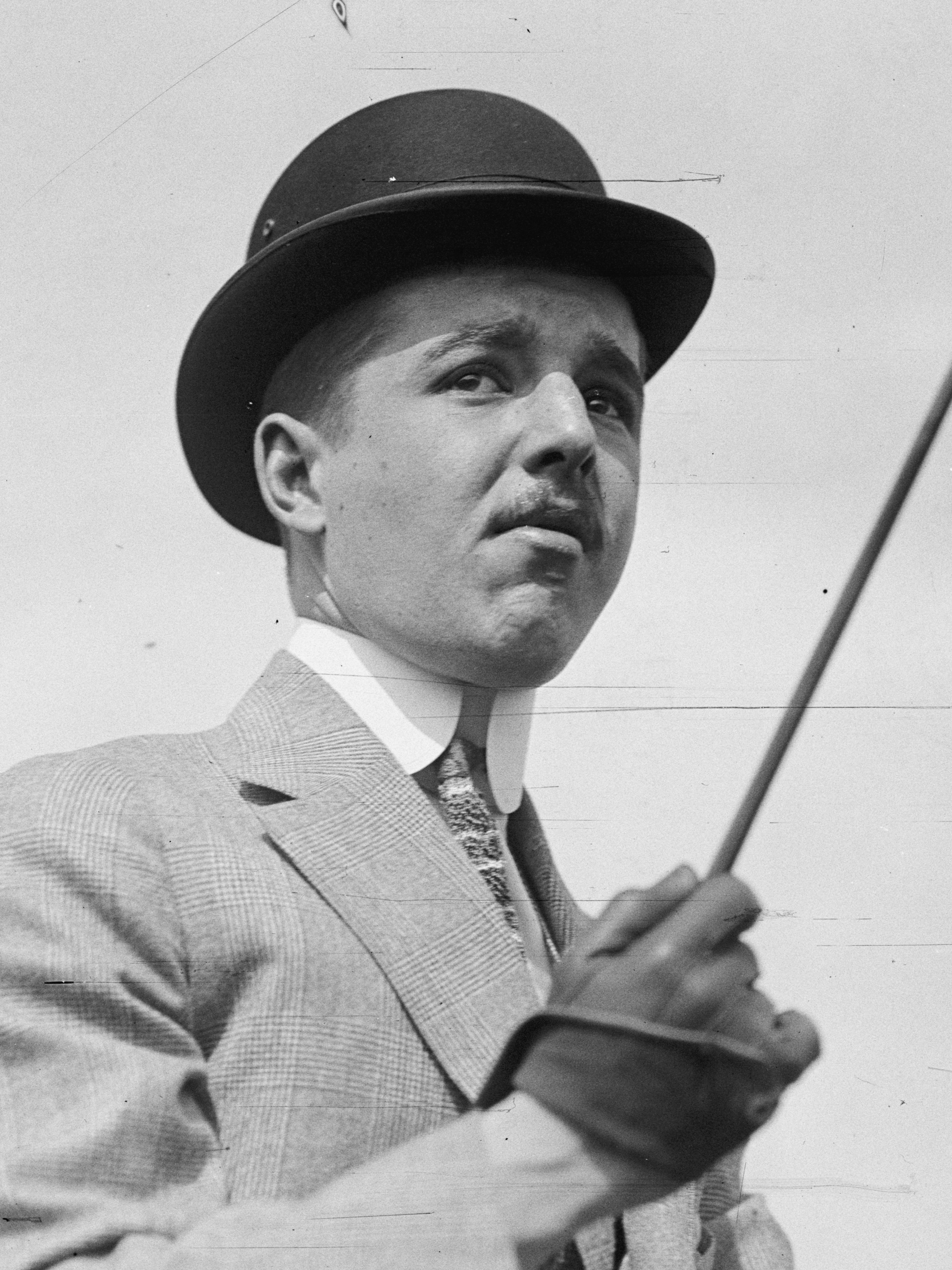
- Busch at a horse show, 1911
- Born: February 10, 1891; St. Louis, Missouri, U.S.
- Died: August 29, 1946 (aged 55); St. Louis, Missouri, U.S.
- Occupation: Brewing Executive
- Spouse: Florence McRhea Lambert (divorced)
- Children: 2 daughters
- Parent(s): August A. Busch Sr. Alice Ziesemann
- Relatives: Adolphus Busch (paternal grandfather)

Adolphus Busch III (February 10, 1891 – August 29, 1946) was an American brewing magnate based in St. Louis, Missouri, who was the president and CEO of Anheuser-Busch from 1934 to 1946 during World War II.

== Early life ==
Adolphus Busch III was born on February 10, 1891. His father, August A. Busch Sr., served as the chief executive officer of Anheuser-Busch from 1913 to 1934. His mother was Alice Ziesemann. He was the grandson of Adolphus Busch, the founder of the company, and his namesake. He had four siblings, including August A. "Gussie" Busch Jr.

== Career ==
Busch joined the family business of the Anheuser-Busch Company and developed its baker's yeast operations into the nation's leader. He served as its president from 1934 to 1946.

== Personal ==
Busch was married twice. He and his first wife Florence McRhea Lambert (née Parker) had a daughter Marie Eleanor Busch (married Herbert D. Condie Jr.). He and his second wife Catherine Milliken Bowen had a daughter Sallie Marie Busch (married Kenneth M. Wheeler Jr.). He died on August 29, 1946, at Barnes Hospital in St. Louis, Missouri, of a cerebral hemorrhage.
