= Anheuser-Busch =

Belgian-owned American brewing company

Coordinates: 38°35′57″N 90°12′52″W

Anheuser-Busch Companies, LLC
- Formerly: Bavarian Brewery (1852–1860); E. Anheuser & Company (1860–1875); E. Anheuser Company Brewing Association (1875–1879); Anheuser-Busch Brewing Association (1879–1919); Anheuser-Busch, Inc. (1919–1979); Anheuser-Busch Companies, Inc. (1979–2013)
- Type: Subsidiary
- Traded as: NYSE: BUD
- Industry: beverages; beverage packaging
- Founded: 1852; 174 years ago (as Bavarian Brewery)
- Founder: Eberhard Anheuser; Adolphus Busch
- Headquarters: St. Louis, Missouri, U.S.
- Number of locations: 12 breweries & 9 can plants
- Area served: North America
- Key people: Brendan Whitworth (president and CEO)
- Products: beer; malt beverages; energy drinks; bottled water
- Revenue: US$15.588 billion (2018)
- Net income: US$9.811 billion (2018)
- Parent: AB InBev
- Website: anheuser-busch.com

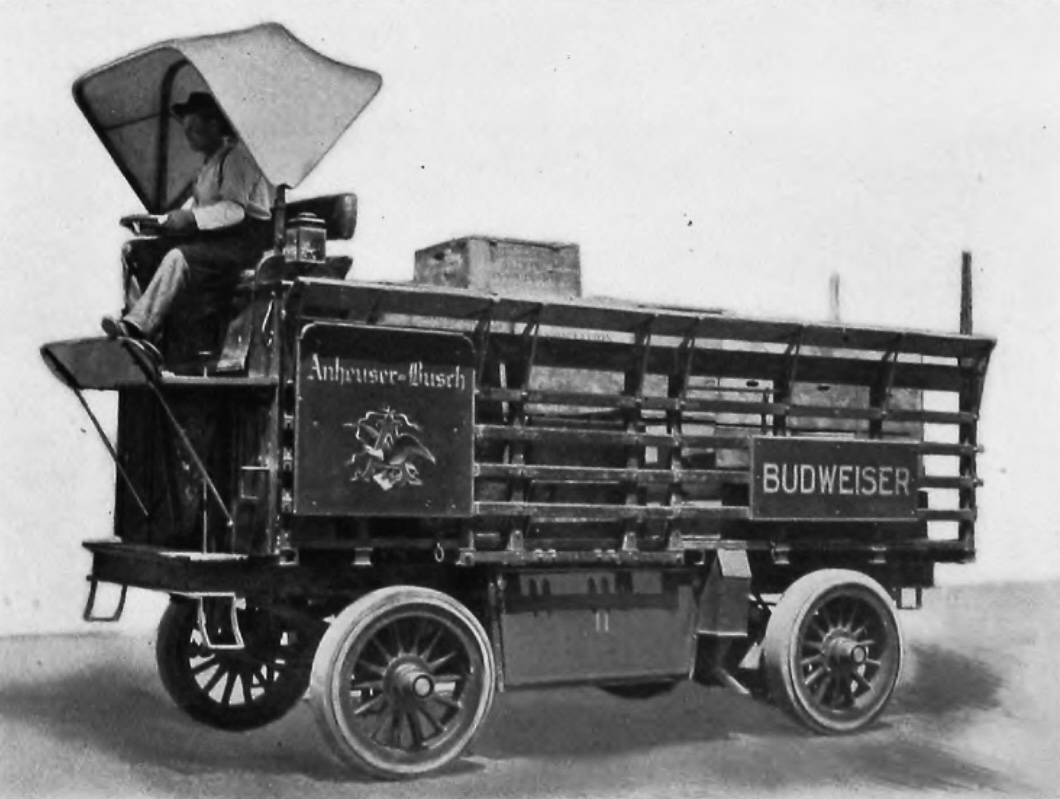
Anheuser-Busch delivery Truck (1905)

Anheuser-Busch Companies, LLC (/ˈænhaɪzər ˈbʊʃ/ AN-hy-zər BUUSH) is a Belgian-American brewing company headquartered in St. Louis, Missouri. Since 2008, following the hostile takeover by AB Inbev of Belgium, it has been wholly owned by Anheuser-Busch InBev SA/NV (AB InBev), the world's largest brewing company, which owns global brands such as Budweiser, Michelob, Stella Artois, and Beck's.

The company employs over 19,000 people, operates 12 breweries and nine aluminum can plants in the United States, and until December 2009, was one of the largest theme park operators in the United States, with ten theme parks through the company's family entertainment division Busch Entertainment Corporation.

== History ==
=== Beginnings and national expansion ===
In 1852, German American brewer and saloon operator George Schneider opened the Bavarian Brewery on Carondelet Avenue (later known as South Broadway) between Dorcas and Lynch streets in South St. Louis. Schneider's Brewery expanded in 1856 to a new brewhouse near Eighth and Crittenden streets; however, the following year, financial problems forced the sale of the brewery to various owners during the late 1850s. In 1860, the brewery was purchased on the brink of bankruptcy by William D'Oench, a local pharmacist, and Eberhard Anheuser, a prosperous German-born soap manufacturer. D'Oench was the silent partner in the business until 1869 when he sold his half-interest in the company to Anheuser's son-in-law Adolphus Busch. From 1860 to 1875, the brewery was known as E. Anheuser & Co., and from 1875 to 1879 as the E. Anheuser Company's Brewing Association.

Busch, a wholesaler who had immigrated to St. Louis from Germany in 1857, had married Eberhard Anheuser's daughter, Lilly, in 1861. Following his service in the American Civil War, Busch began working as a salesman for the Anheuser Brewery. Busch purchased D'Oench's share of the company in 1869, and he assumed the role of company secretary from that time until the death of his father-in-law.

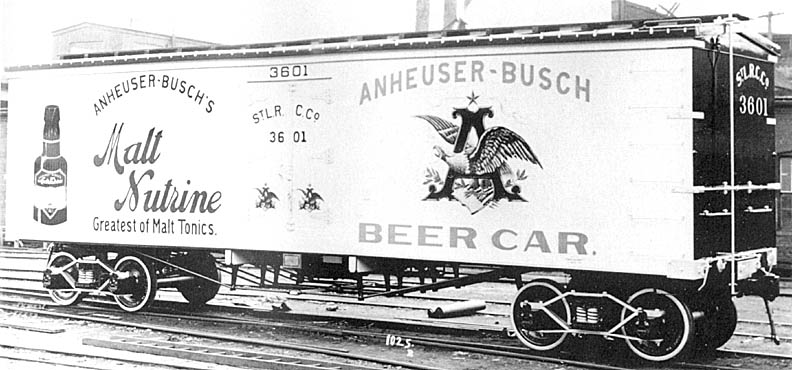
Anheuser-Busch was one of the first companies to transport beer nationwide using railroad refrigerator cars.

Adolphus Busch was the first American brewer to use pasteurization to keep beer fresh; the first to use mechanical refrigeration and refrigerated railroad cars, which he introduced in 1876; and the first to bottle beer extensively. By 1877, the company owned a fleet of 40 refrigerated railroad cars to transport beer. Expanding the company's distribution range led to increased demand for Anheuser products, and the company substantially expanded its facilities in St. Louis during the 1870s. The expansions led production to increase from 31,500 barrels in 1875 to more than 200,000 in 1881.

To streamline the company's refrigerator car operations and achieve vertical integration, Busch established the St. Louis Refrigerator Car Company in 1878, which was charged with building, selling, and leasing refrigerator cars; by 1883, the company owned 200 cars, and by 1888 it owned 850. To serve these cars and switch them in and out of their St. Louis brewery, Anheuser-Busch founded the Manufacturers Railway Company in 1887. The shortline operated until 2011, when Anheuser-Busch shut down its operations.

During the 1870s, Adolphus Busch toured Europe and studied the changes in brewing methods which were taking place at the time, particularly the success of pilsner beer, which included a popular Budweiser beer brewed in Budweis. In 1876, Busch took the already well-known name Budweiser and used it for his new beer, even though his product had no connections to the city of Budweis. His company's ability to transport bottled beer made US Budweiser the first national beer brand in the United States, and it was marketed as a "premium" beer.

The company was renamed Anheuser-Busch Brewing Association in 1879; in 1880, Adolphus Busch became company president upon Anheuser's death. The Busch family fully controlled the company through the generations until Anheuser-Busch's sale to InBev in 2008.

During the 1880s and 1890s, Busch introduced a series of advertisements and marketing giveaways for the company, including bottle openers, calendars, corkscrews, pocketknives, postcards, and prints. Among the most well-known of these giveaways was Custer's Last Fight, a lithograph print of a painting by St. Louis artist Cassilly Adams. As a marketing tactic, Busch distributed thousands of copies of the print to bars in 1896, the same year Anheuser-Busch introduced its new "super-premium" brand, Michelob. Eventually, more than one million copies of the print were produced, and it became "one of the most popular pieces of artwork in American history."

At the turn of the 20th century, Anheuser-Busch continued to expand its production facilities to keep up with demand. In 1905, the company built a new stockhouse in St. Louis, and by 1907 it produced nearly 1.6 million barrels of beer. As demands for the prohibition of alcohol in the United States grew, Anheuser-Busch began producing non-alcoholic and low-alcoholic beverages (known as near beer); the most successful of these was Bevo, a malt beverage introduced in 1908. After the death of Adolphus Busch in 1913, control of the company passed to his son, August Anheuser Busch Sr., who continued to combat the rise of prohibitionists. As part of an effort to improve the respectability of drinking, August Busch built three upscale restaurants in St. Louis during the 1910s: the Stork Inn, the Gretchen Inn (now known as the Feasting Fox), and the Bevo Mill.

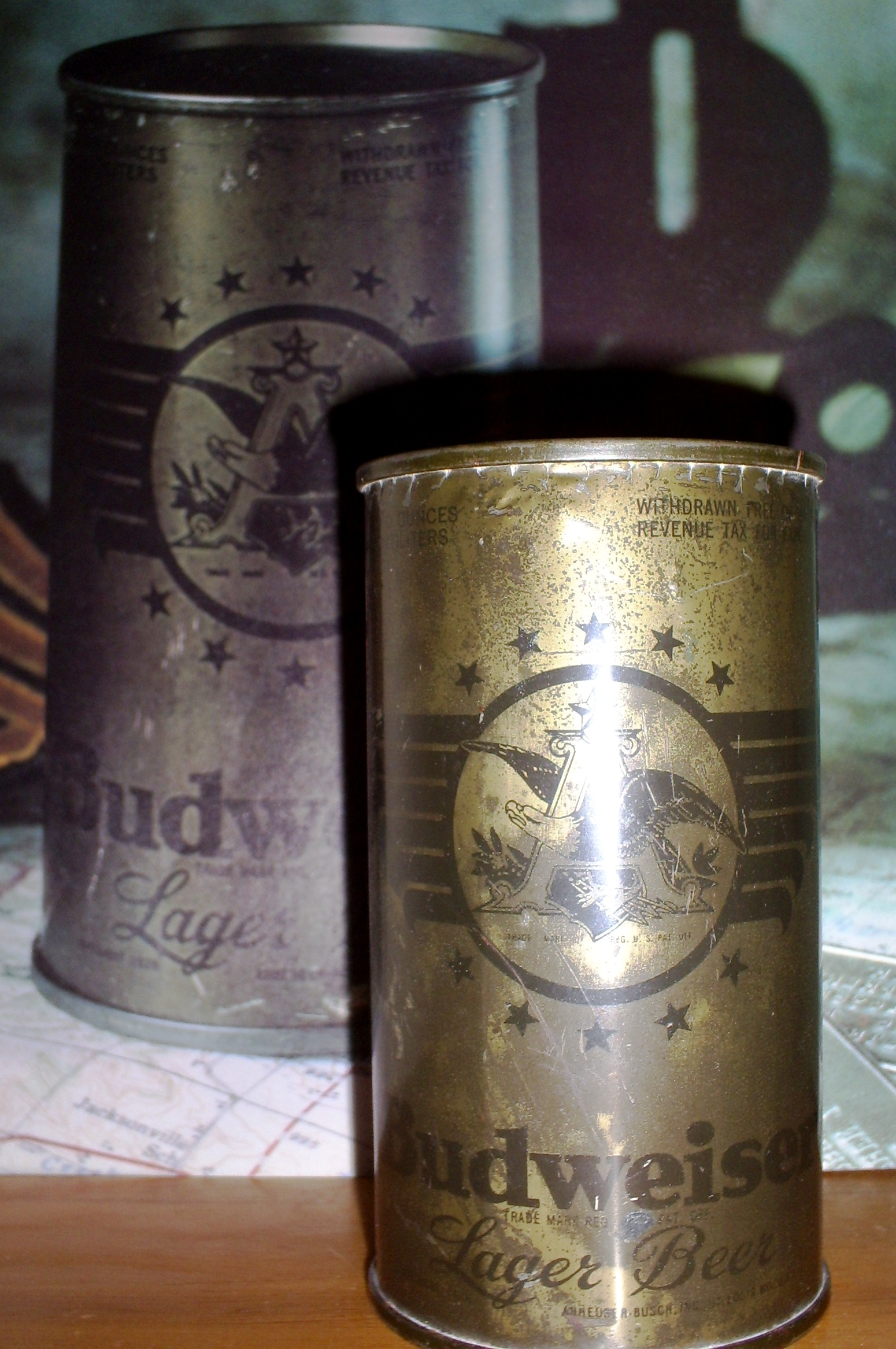
Anheuser-Busch produced olive-colored Budweiser cans during World War II.

=== Prohibition period ===
Original Anheuser-Busch logo used from 1879 to 2022

As with all breweries in the country, the Temperance movement and eventual Prohibition in the United States dealt a major blow to the company in the 1910s through the 1930s. Some of the products sold by Anheuser-Busch to survive during Prohibition included brewer's yeast, malt extract, ice cream, and Bevo, a nonalcoholic malt beverage, or "near beer".

=== Prohibition to last years of independence ===
In 1957, Anheuser-Busch became the largest brewer in the United States.

In 1981, Anheuser-Busch International, Inc., was established as a subsidiary responsible for the company's international operations and equity investments. Prior to its 2008 acquisition, Anheuser-Busch operated 15 breweries internationally: 14 in China and one in the United Kingdom.

In 1997, Chinese production of Anheuser-Busch products began after the company's purchase of a local brewery; later, the company operated both Budweiser Wuhan International Brewing Company and Harbin Brewery, which Anheuser-Busch fully acquired in 2004. In the United Kingdom, the Budweiser Stag Brewing Company produced and packaged Budweiser at the Stag Brewery in Mortlake.

At one time, Anheuser-Busch International also held investments in Grupo Modelo in Mexico Tsingtao Brewery in China; Anheuser-Busch also held investments in Redhook Ale Brewery of Seattle, Washington and Widmer Brothers Brewery of Portland, Oregon. After the 2008 acquisition, most international operations were transferred to AB InBev zones where the interests are located.

=== Acquisition by InBev ===
On June 12, 2008, Belgian-Brazilian brewing company InBev announced that it had made a US$46 billion offer for the company, which if it was accepted would join two of the world's four largest brewing companies (based on revenue) and create a company brewing three of the highest-grossing beers in the world, namely Bud Light, Budweiser, and Skol. InBev also stated that the merger would not result in any U.S. brewery closures and they would attempt to retain management and board members from both companies. On June 25, 2008, Anheuser-Busch officially announced that they would reject InBev's offer and provide a restructuring of the company to maintain shareholders and United States World Headquarters in St. Louis. On July 1, 2008, InBev urged Anheuser-Busch shareholders to vote in favor of the buyout as InBev felt the offer of $65 per share should be considered a reasonable offer in view of the falling stock market. The company had previously filed suit in Delaware, after the rejection of their offer, to ensure that the stockholders could oust Anheuser-Busch's 13 board members. On July 7, 2008, Anheuser-Busch filed a lawsuit against InBev to stop them from soliciting the support of shareholders, stating that the company's offer is an illegal scheme. InBev was also accused of concealing that they do business in Cuba, which might have created additional obstacles to their efforts to operate in the United States.

On July 13, 2008, Anheuser-Busch and InBev said they had agreed to a deal, pending shareholder and regulatory approval, for InBev to purchase the American icon at $70 per share, creating a new company to be named Anheuser-Busch InBev. Anheuser-Busch would get two seats on the combined board of directors. The all-cash agreement, almost $52 billion in total equity, created the world's largest brewer, uniting the maker of Budweiser and Michelob with the producer of Beck's, Stella Artois, Hoegaarden, Leffe, Bass, Labatt and Brahma. The two companies had combined yearly sales of more than $36.4 billion, surpassing the current No. 1 brewer, London-based SABMiller.

Grupo Modelo took InBev to arbitration for more than a year and a half after the deal was completed, attempting to block the deal.

On October 7, 2009, parent company Anheuser-Busch InBev announced plans to sell the theme parks division to The Blackstone Group for up to US$2.7 billion.

In July 2010, a panel decided that the takeover did not violate Anheuser-Busch's agreement with Modelo.

=== Post-acquisition changes ===
On November 18, 2008, the hostile takeover was completed, and the parent corporation was renamed Anheuser-Busch InBev; Anheuser-Busch became a wholly owned subsidiary of the new corporation, controlled within the North America zone unit of AB InBev. By early 2009, AB InBev "turned a family-led company that spared little expense into one that is focused intently on cost-cutting and profit margins, while rethinking the way it sells beer." AB InBev focused on reducing costs in the Anheuser-Busch Companies subsidiary and implemented performance-related pay, along with several other changes. They immediately laid off 1,400 employees and 415 contractors, sold Busch Entertainment Corporation, and sold company-owned aircraft.

For employees, AB InBev ended perquisites such as executive assistants for senior management, company contributions to the salaried employee pension plan, and company-provided life insurance to retirees; it also reduced the number of company-provided cell phones, taking back 1200 Blackberries; and ended tuition reimbursement, and severance packages. Perks like free tickets to St. Louis Cardinals baseball games and for Busch Gardens were taken away from employees. Anheuser-Busch stopped providing free beer to its employees and visitors to its theme parks. These internal changes accompanied changes in its advertising. These cost-cutting measures rapidly reduced AB InBev's debt from $56.6 billion in 2008 to $30.1 billion at the end of 2012. When the restructuring was complete, only three senior-level Anheuser-Busch managers remained.

InBev auctioned off several large assets in an effort to pay off debt to the banks that financed the merger. It sold Anheuser's 27% stake in China's Tsingtao, sold a few beverage can and lid-making plants to Ball Corporation, and sold its own Korean beer business for $1.8 billion to private equity firm Kohlberg Kravis and Roberts & Co. It put the 10 theme parks in Anheuser's Busch Entertainment Unit, which included its three SeaWorld locations, up for sale.

Under InBev, Anheuser-Busch also lengthened accounts payable terms, and introduced zero-based budgeting. These changes caused concern from its suppliers when Anheuser-Busch announced it would take 120 days to pay its bills rather than 30 days, taking time to use that money for other purposes. The new payment policy often results in longer periods than 120 days, since the 120 days starts from the end of the month in which the invoice is 'approved' internally, which can be many days/months after an invoice is submitted.

InBev signed a 10-year lease on 31,500 square feet of office space on Park Avenue in New York, which led to speculation that they would move Anheuser-Busch InBev North American headquarters from St Louis.

In February 2013, a widely publicized lawsuit accused AB InBev of "watering down" products including Budweiser and Michelob. Such beers are intentionally brewed over-strength and then "watered down" to the intended level, creating a product of equal or greater quality. The lawsuit was dismissed.

Of Anheuser's top executives, only three remained in their jobs following the acquisition: Dave Peacock as president of the merged company's US division; Gary Rutledge as general counsel for the company's North American business; and Bob Golden, Anheuser's former acquisitions head, as global head of the merged company's mergers and acquisitions effort.

== Operations and products ==
Anheuser-Busch Companies operates as one of several subsidiaries in the North America zone unit of Anheuser-Busch InBev SA/NV (AB InBev) and it produces and distributes hundreds of products from the AB InBev portfolio.

On October 10, 2016, a $100 billion merger between Anheuser-Busch InBev and SABMiller closed. The new company is trading as NewbelcoSABMiller.

=== Corporate leadership ===
Michel Doukeris is the current CEO of AB InBev, the parent company of the U.S. operation, and Brendan Whitworth is the current CEO of the Anheuser-Busch subsidiary.

Previous corporate leaders of Anheuser-Busch include:

- 1860–1880 Eberhard Anheuser
- 1880–1913 Adolphus Busch
- 1913–1934 August A. Busch Sr.
- 1934–1946 Adolphus Busch III
- 1946–1971 Gussie Busch
- 1971–1974 Richard A. Meyer
- 1974–2002 August A. Busch III
- 2002–2006 Patrick Stokes
- 2006–2008 August A. Busch IV

In 2008 Anheuser-Busch was acquired by InBev, and the combined company was renamed Anheuser-Busch InBev.

Years	CEO of parent company AB InBev	Leader of the Anheuser-Busch subsidiary
2008–2012	Carlos Brito	President Dave Peacock
2012–2014	Carlos Brito	Luiz Edmond
2014–2018	Carlos Brito	João Castro Neves
2018–2021	Carlos Brito	Michel Doukeris
2021–Present	Michel Doukeris	CEO Brendan Whitworth

=== Brewery operations ===
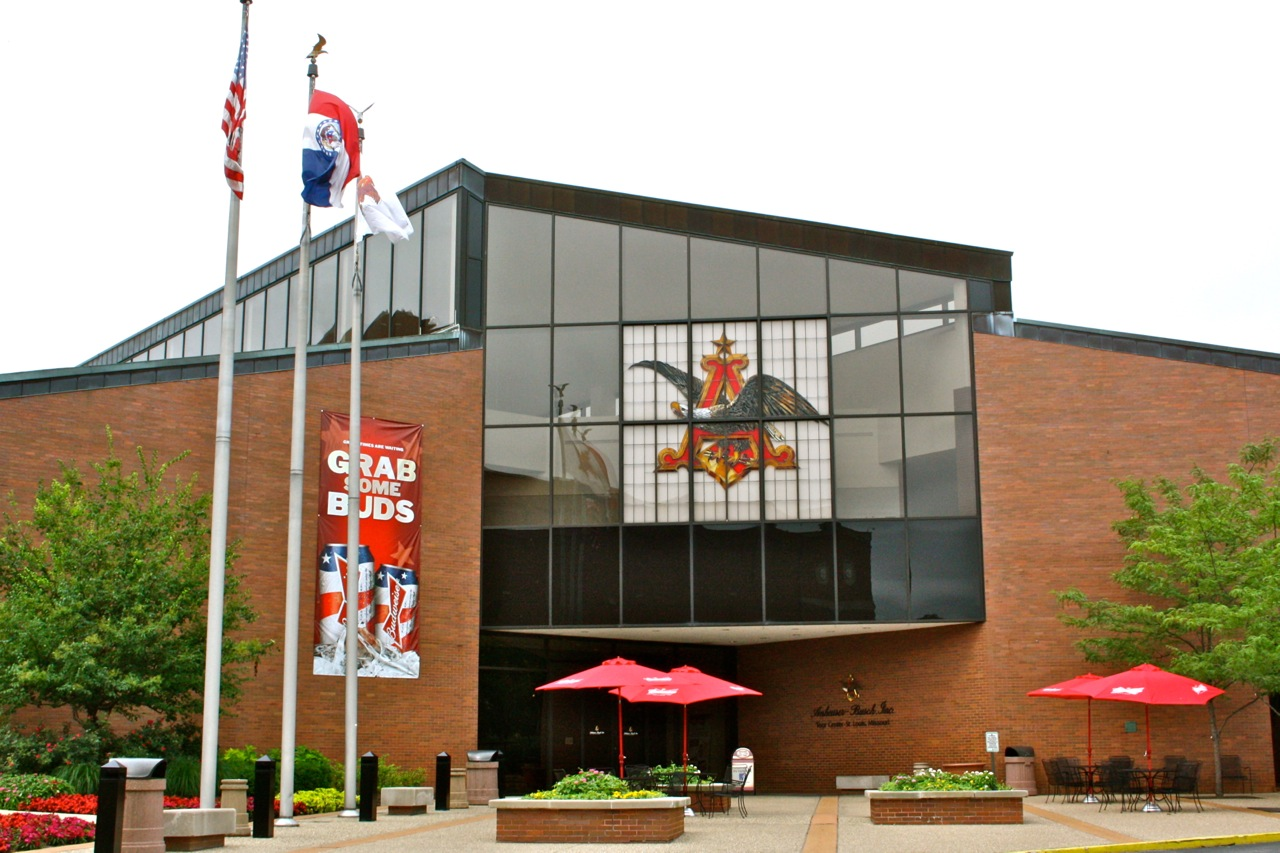
Brewery at St. Louis

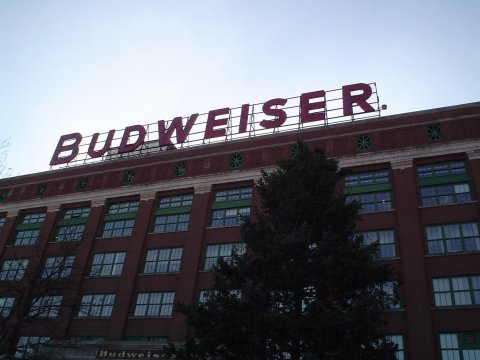
The packaging plant in St. Louis

Anheuser-Busch Companies has operated 13 breweries, all located in the United States:

- St. Louis, Missouri (opened 1852)
- Newark, New Jersey (opened 1951, currently being sold)
- Los Angeles, California (opened 1954)
- Tampa, Florida (opened 1959, now closed)
- Houston, Texas (opened 1966)
- Columbus, Ohio (opened 1968)
- Jacksonville, Florida (opened 1969)
- Merrimack, New Hampshire (opened 1970, now closed)
- Williamsburg, Virginia (opened 1972)
- Fairfield, California (opened 1976, now closed)
- Baldwinsville, New York (opened 1983)
- Fort Collins, Colorado (opened 1988)
- Cartersville, Georgia (opened 1993)

The St. Louis brewery, which opened in 1852, is a National Historic Landmark District, and includes three buildings listed as National Historic Landmarks. Public tours of the brewery are offered. The tour takes visitors through the complex where they can see beer being made and packaged in a working part of the brewery. The company keeps a rotation of its famous Budweiser Clydesdales at its headquarters, and visitors to the brewery can observe the clydesdales in their exercise field and see their places in the carriage house.

The brewery was designated a National Historic Landmark in 1966. The landmarked area includes 189 structures spread over 142 acres (57 ha), including many red brick Romanesque ones "with square crenelated towers and elaborate details." The Brew House, built in 1891–1892, is particularly notable for its "multi-storied hop chandeliers, intricate iron-work, and utilization of natural light".

=== Other operations ===
Aside from supply operations like brewing and packaging, Anheuser-Busch Companies includes Anheuser-Busch Wholesale Operations Divisions (WOD), Anheuser-Busch Agricultural Operations, Anheuser-Busch Recycling Corporation, Eagle Packaging, and Busch Properties, which manages subsidiary-owned property. Anheuser Busch owns and operates aluminum can plants (Metal Container Corporation). MCC supplies Anheuser Busch breweries and Pepsi Beverages Group fillers across the US. Suppliers to Anheuser-Busch Companies include Owens-Illinois, which provides glass bottles to several Anheuser-Busch breweries. Anheuser-Busch also owns glass production facilities, such as the former Longhorn Glass, which provides glass for the Houston brewery. Anheuser-Busch Companies delivers its products to retailers through a network of more than 500 independent wholesalers and 13 wholly owned distributors.

On February 20, 1953, Anheuser-Busch purchased the St. Louis Cardinals major league baseball club and owned them until March 21, 1996, when the club was sold to a group of private investors.

In 1966, Busch Memorial Stadium was paid for and built by the brewery and opened for business; Anheuser-Busch later purchased the stadium in 1981 for $53 million and removed the "Memorial" in its name. The stadium was demolished in late 2005 and replaced by a new ballpark in 2006. Anheuser-Busch signed an agreement to retain the "Busch Stadium" name on the new building through 2025, later extending the rights until the end of the 2030 season.

Up until 2009, Anheuser-Busch was also one of the largest theme park owners/operators in the United States, with ten parks throughout the country through its entertainment division, Busch Entertainment Corporation, including its three SeaWorld locations. The company is now known as SeaWorld Parks & Entertainment.

=== Beverage products ===
Anheuser-Busch Companies is responsible for the production, importation and distribution of several AB InBev products, including three company-designated global brands, Budweiser, Stella Artois, and Beck's. Other multi-country brands distributed or produced by Anheuser-Busch Companies include Leffe and Hoegaarden, while local brands produced by the company include Bass Pale Ale, Bud Light, Busch Beer, Landshark Lager, Michelob, Michelob Ultra, Natural Light, and Shock Top. The company also produces nonalcoholic beverages, malt liquors (such as King Cobra and Hurricane), and flavored malt beverages (e.g. the Bacardi Silver family and Tequiza).

On December 22, 2015, it was announced that Anheuser-Busch would purchase Breckenridge Brewery for an undisclosed sum.

== Advertising ==
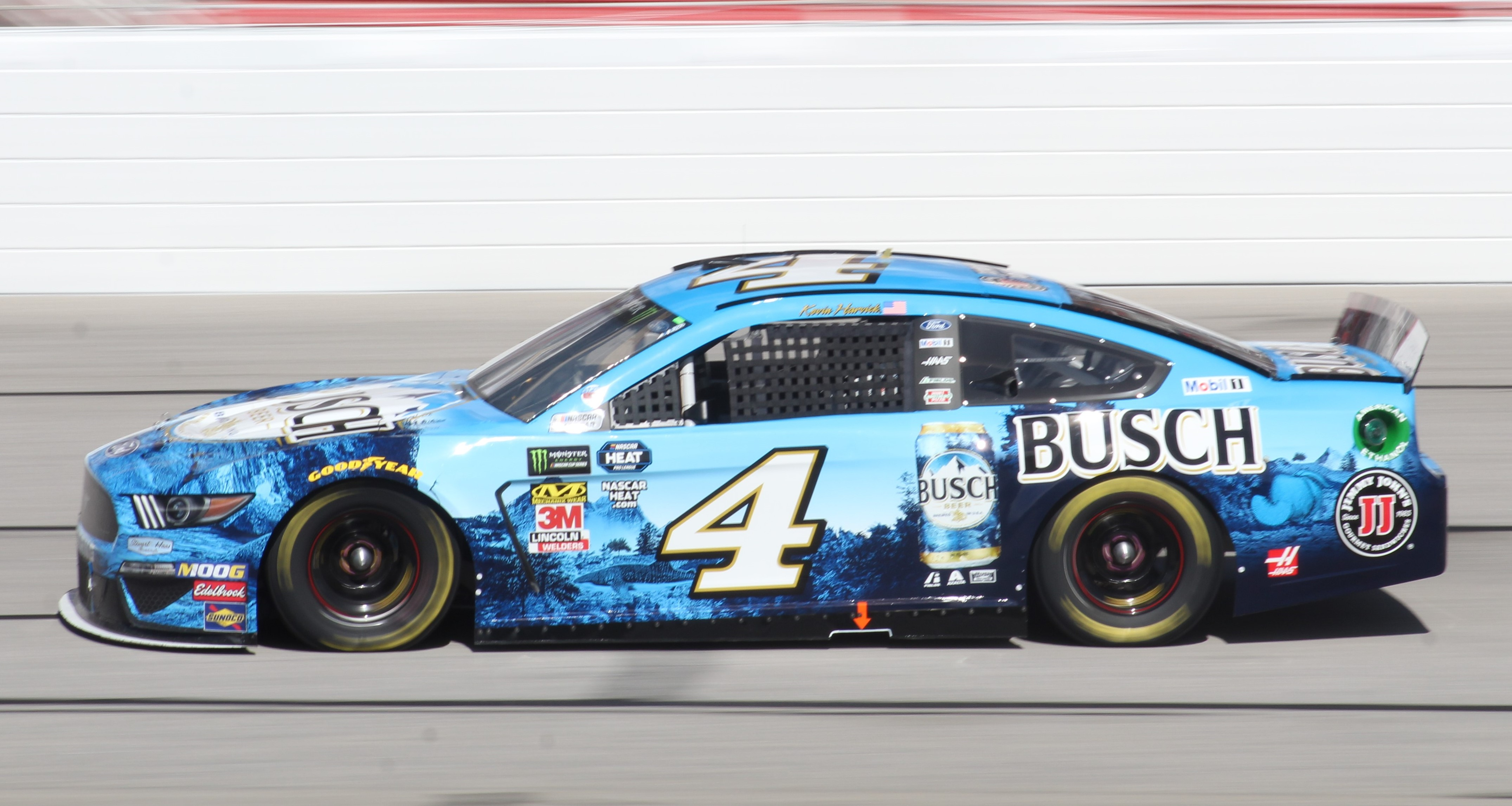
Kevin Harvick's Busch sponsored 2019 NASCAR Ford Mustang at Pocono Raceway

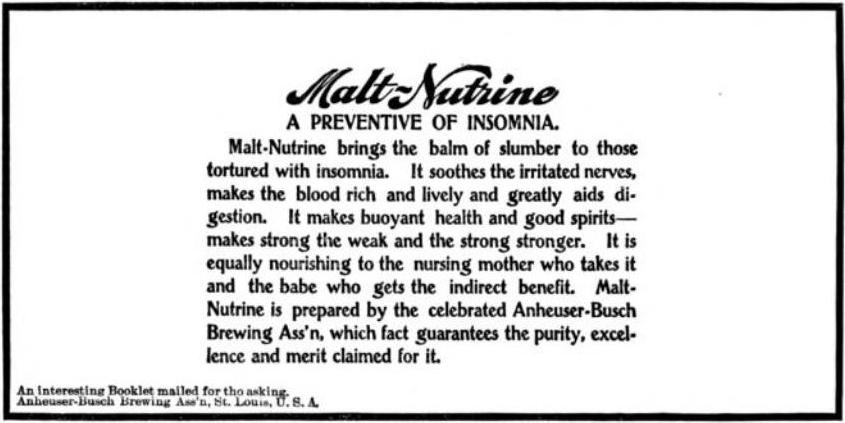
1898 magazine ad for Malt-Nutrine

Prior to its acquisition by InBev, the company was known in the United States for its advertising presence, including a sports marketing division which created advertising material for the Super Bowl and many other sporting events. Budweiser has sponsored horse racing events and motorsports including NASCAR, the "Miss Budweiser" racing hydroplane, and the "Budweiser King" championship top fuel dragster of Kenny Bernstein.

Since the acquisition by AB InBev, the company has significantly cut back its advertising, predicated on the belief that "changing demographics and media habits no longer require spending as much on mainstream sports events".

== Controversies ==
=== Spykes underaged alcohol marketing ===
In 2007, the company introduced a flavored 12% abv malt liquor under the name Spykes. It was sold in colorful, 2-ounce bottles. Available flavors included mango, lime, melon and chocolate. It was withdrawn in the same year after criticism from alcohol industry watchdog groups that it was being marketed to underage customers, and the Alcohol and Tobacco Tax and Trade Bureau found that the labeling of Spykes was illegal.

=== Environmental record ===
In 2002, the Political Economy Research Institute ranked Anheuser–Busch 40th among the "Toxic 100", a list of U.S. corporations most responsible for air pollution. The study found that Anheuser–Busch released 1,002,786 kg (2,213,657 lbs) of toxic pollutants annually into the air. This is mainly because large amounts of CO_{2} are released during the process of fermentation.

Anheuser-Busch has received numerous awards for its efforts to reduce its impact on the environment. In 1995 Anheuser-Busch's Baldwinsville brewery won an award for pollution prevention from the New York Governor for its use of a "comprehensive, energy-producing pollution-prevention system – bioenergy recovery – to treat wastewater from the brewing process." The brewery also reduced solid waste by nearly 70 percent from 1990 to 1994. In addition, the Baldwinsville brewery found markets for previous "waste" materials used in the fermentation of Anheuser-Busch beers. The Anheuser-Busch Recycling Corp. recycled more than 27 billion cans in 2006, a number far greater than what was used in its own packaging. Similarly, Anheuser-Busch has set short-term goals to reduce energy consumption 5% and increasing use of renewable fuel from 8 to 15% by 2010. Along with these goals, Anheuser-Busch has succeeded in cutting down its water use by 3% since 2002. Its parent company Anheuser-Busch InBev has recently announced a commitment to secure 100% of the company's purchased electricity from renewable sources by 2025.

The brewery also operates an environmental outreach program to encourage recycling, energy conservation, and habitat preservation, as well as to prevent littering and water pollution. For the past 18 years Anheuser-Busch employees have participated in "Green Week", which focuses on environmental conservation education for employees and their families.

Anheuser-Busch states they do not use animal-derived products, artificial ingredients, additives or preservatives at any stage of the brewing process or as part of the packaging in any of their range, with the exception of three Michelob products and two Bud Light products, which contain honey and shellfish respectively, and are marketed as such. All other Anheuser-Busch beers are brewed using water, yeast, barley malt, hops, and additional cereal grains. Anheuser-Busch eliminates the need for isinglass finings by settling and removing particles before fermentation. The beechwood aging process also helps to attract and remove yeast from the brew before the lagering process has ended. This only applies to the beers the company brews itself.

Anheuser-Busch became a pioneer for electricity-powered heavy trucks. It ordered hundreds of trucks from Nikola Motor, an Arizona company specialized in the development of hydrogen-fueled engines.

=== Budweiser Bill ===
In 2003, after numerous deaths in soccer stadiums, Brazil passed a law outlawing alcohol sales in stadiums. FIFA demanded that Brazil allow alcohol sales at the 2014 FIFA World Cup because Budweiser, a major World Cup sponsor is the "Official Beer of the FIFA World Cup", a role it has played since 1986.

In response, Brazil passed a law paving the way for alcohol sales in the World Cup, nicknamed the "Budweiser Bill".

=== "Up for Whatever" beer campaign controversy ===
In April 2015, Anheuser-Busch, in an effort to target new, younger consumers to buy its products, the company printed a slogan on Bud Light bottles that said "The perfect beer for removing 'no' from your vocabulary for the night. #UpForWhatever." The label triggered a backlash, and the company was immediately criticized by people who charged that it could be interpreted as promoting rape. Bud Light's vice president Alexander Lambrecht addressed the situation via Twitter, first saying that the slogans were meant to promote brand engagement in a "positive and lighthearted way", but that the company had "missed the mark" with their "up for whatever" slogan. He ended his message by saying that Bud Light would "never condone disrespectful or irresponsible behavior". His message was followed by a Twitter response from Lisa Weser; the former head of communications and marketing for Anheuser-Busch InBev, who also responded to the situation via Twitter. Her response repeated Alexander Lambrecht's concluding message.

=== Liquor law violations in Seattle ===
The Washington State Liquor and Cannabis Board (WSLCB) issued a $150,000 violation to Anheuser-Busch in May 2016. Investigators determined that Anheuser-Busch entered into an illegal agreement of exclusivity with two concert venues in Seattle – the Showbox and the Showbox SoDo.

=== 2017 Super Bowl advertising ===
In early February 2017, Anheuser-Busch's "Budweiser – Born the Hard Way" Super Bowl commercial was released online, prompting conservative political rebuke over its depiction of the immigration of founder Adolphus Busch from Germany to St. Louis. Although the ad had been conceived eight months before its release, some perceived the ad to be a political statement in opposition to then-current president Donald Trump. A week before the ad's release, public controversy erupted over an executive order prohibiting entry of immigrants, refugees, and re-entry of permanent residents from seven countries into the United States. The script for the advertisement was finalized after the November elections, when Budweiser's internal marketing team settled on the twelfth revision of the script. Shooting for the commercial then took place in January. The ad controversy followed after controversy in May 2016 when Trump, then a presidential candidate, was perceived by some to be hijacking Budweiser's America branding campaign for his own political purposes.

=== 2019 Super Bowl advertising ===
On March 21, 2019, Anheuser-Busch was sued for false advertising by rival MillerCoors over a Bud Light commercial that aired during Super Bowl LIII. The commercial claimed MillerCoors' Miller Lite and Coors Light products contain corn syrup, but the lawsuit argues that corn syrup is only used during the brewing process as a fermentation aid and neither beer contains corn syrup. The suit alleges that Anheuser-Busch is using "false and misleading statements" to confuse health-conscious consumers into thinking the beers contain high-fructose corn syrup, which has been linked with obesity. An Anheuser-Busch spokesperson called the lawsuit "baseless" and said it would not deter Bud Light from "providing consumers with the transparency they demand." MillerCoors sought an injunction to prevent Bud Light from continuing the ad campaign, as well as a trial by jury and legal fees. Anheuser-Busch prevailed in the Seventh Circuit in 2020, with the court finding that since Miller included corn syrup on the ingredients list, Anheuser-Busch was within the bounds of the Lanham Act.

=== 2023 Bud Light boycott ===
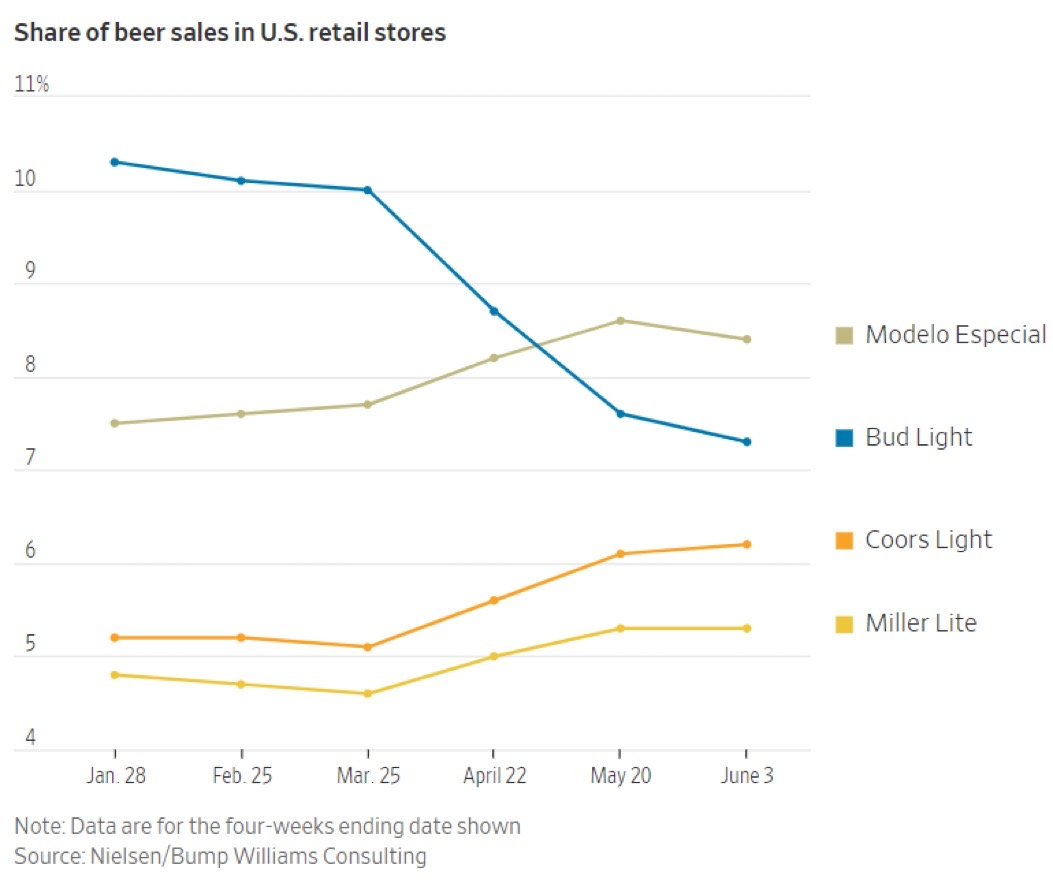
Top beer brands in the U.S. the first half of 2023

On April 2, 2023, Anheuser-Busch's brand Bud Light started facing a boycott, after partnering with transgender influencer and activist Dylan Mulvaney. Alissa Heinerscheid, the vice president of marketing behind the campaign, took a leave of absence on April 21, 2023. She was replaced by Budweiser Global Marketing VP Todd Allen.

On May 10, 2023, HSBC downgraded Anheuser-Busch InBev stock as it dealt with a "Bud Light crisis". Analysts at HSBC cited "deeper problems than ABI admits" after the partnership with Mulvaney resulted in a wave of backlash and a boycott. The analyst cited a Beer Marketer's Insights note that showed a steep drop in beer sales "of maybe more than 25%" in April.

On June 13, 2023, The Wall Street Journal reported that Bud Light lost the title as the top-selling U.S. beer, with Modelo Especial in May taking the top sales spot.

Yahoo! Finance, on July 10, 2023, reported a recent YouGov survey's findings that Bud Light's popularity among American beer brands dropped to the 14th position.

On July 26, 2023, The Wall Street Journal reported that Anheuser-Busch laid off hundreds of workers at its U.S. sales offices after months of slumping sales at Bud Light.

Anheuser-Busch reported in its second quarter earnings, on August 3, 2023, that its revenue in the United States fell more than 10 percent in the second quarter, versus the same period last year, “primarily due to the volume decline of Bud Light.” Operating profit at the U.S. unit dropped by nearly 30 percent.

On February 29, 2024, CNN Business reported that Anheuser-Busch InBev experienced a significant financial hit, potentially losing up to $1.4 billion in sales. This loss was attributed to the controversy and subsequent boycott of Bud Light in the United States, following the sponsored Instagram post featuring the transgender influencer Dylan Mulvaney, which notably impacted the company's overall growth and beer sales volume in North America.

=== 2025 PrideFest ===
In 2025, Anheuser-Busch broke ties with St. Louis PrideFest after 30 years as the main corporate sponsor. In response, several St. Louis LGBTQ and ally bars announced they would stop carrying AB products.

== Ties with Washington University in St. Louis ==
Adolphus Busch joined Washington University's Board of Directors in 1895, back when the school was still located on its old downtown St. Louis campus. Adolphus would continue to serve on the board until his death in 1913, at which point his son, August Busch Sr. took over his seat. Though Adolphus Busch III and Gussie Busch never sat on the board, the ties between their company and the school were still strong. August Busch III, CEO of Anheuser-Busch from 1975 to 2002, would become a trustee of the university, a position he holds to this day. The Anheuser-Busch Foundation donation that gave its name to Anheuser-Busch Hall was made in honor of Fred L. Kuhlmann, an executive officer of both the company and the St. Louis Cardinals under August Busch III. Kuhlmann, who held these positions for most of the 1980s and early 1990s, graduated from WashU's undergraduate and law programs. Though the Busch family no longer owns Anheuser-Busch, the connection between the company and the university is ongoing. Jack H. Purnell, former CEO of Anheuser-Busch, where he worked for 36 years, is an executive in residence of the Olin Business School.

== See also ==
- Anheuser-Busch InBev
- Anheuser-Busch Brewing Association Building
- SeaWorld Entertainment
- Manufacturers Railway (St. Louis)
- Jacques Chirac – former President of France worked at the St Louis plant in the 1950s during his summer term at Harvard University.
