= August Anheuser Busch Sr. =

American brewing magnate (1865–1934)

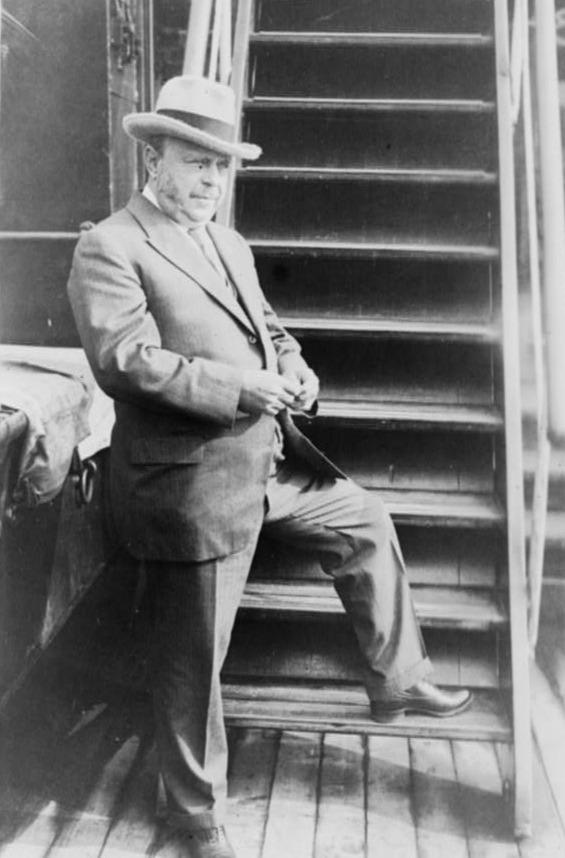
- August A. Busch in 1925
- Born: December 29, 1865; St. Louis, Missouri, U.S.
- Died: February 10, 1934 (aged 68); St. Louis, Missouri, U.S.
- Occupation: Brewing
- Spouse: Alice Edna Zisemann
- Children: 5, including Adolphus Busch III and August A. "Gussie" Busch Jr.
- Parent(s): Lily (Anheuser) and Adolphus Busch

August Anheuser Busch Sr. (December 29, 1865 – February 10, 1934) was an American brewing magnate who served as the President and CEO of Anheuser-Busch, based in St. Louis, Missouri, from 1913 to 1934. It became the world's largest brewery in 1957 under direction of his son August A. "Gussie" Busch Jr.

== Early life ==
August Anheuser Busch was born on December 29, 1865, in St. Louis, Missouri. His father, Adolphus Busch, was the German-born founder of Anheuser-Busch. His mother, Lilly Eberhard Anheuser, was the third daughter of brewer Eberhard Anheuser, who owned the Anheuser Brewery. He had eight brothers and five sisters.

== Career ==
Busch became President of Anheuser-Busch in 1913, shortly after his father's death. Under his leadership, the company survived World War I, Prohibition, and the Great Depression by innovating and diversifying.

The company delved into the production of corn products, baker's yeast, ice cream, soft drinks, and commercial refrigeration units to stay afloat during Prohibition. After Prohibition ended in 1933, many of these operations were discontinued. August also managed to keep Anheuser-Busch prosperous during anti-German bias of World War I. He built the Bevo Mill, about halfway between his mansion on Gravois Road and the Anheuser-Busch brewery downtown.

== Personal life ==
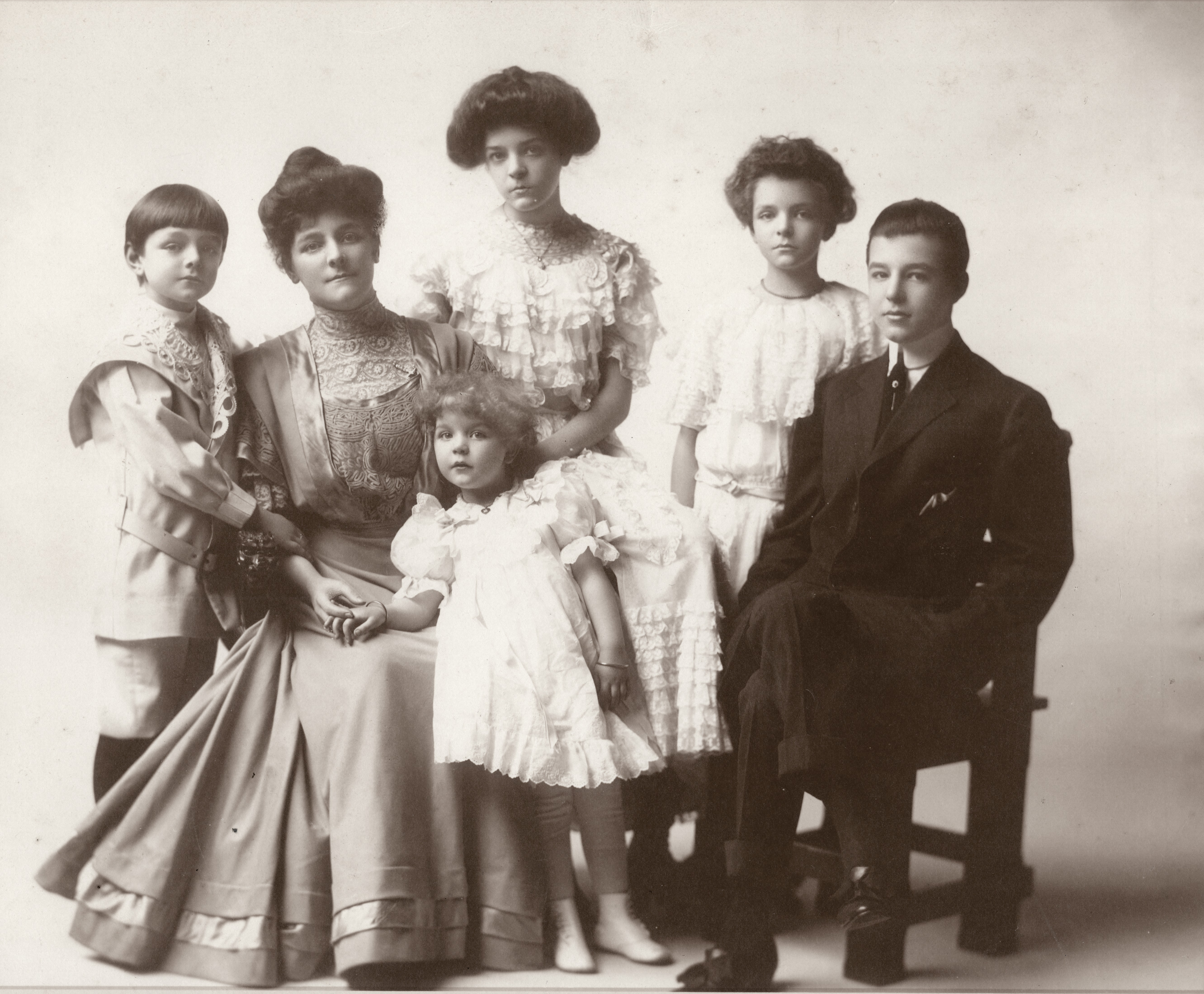
Busch's wife and children

Busch married Alice Ziesemann on May 8, 1890. Their children were Adolphus III, Marie, Clara, August Jr., and Alice Busch. The Busches were among prominent families who participated in the Veiled Prophet Ball, and in 1922, Alice Busch was selected as that year's Queen of Love and Beauty.

Both sons joined the family business. Eldest son Adolphus became president and CEO of Anheuser-Busch. After his death in 1946, August Jr. became CEO, building the company into the largest brewery in the world.

== Death and legacy ==
In his later life, Busch suffered from heart disease, dropsy, and gout. After being severely ill for several months, he committed suicide at the age of 68 with a gunshot to the abdomen on February 10, 1934, at the Busch Mansion at Grant's Farm. Before shooting himself, August penned a brief note to his family saying, "Goodbye precious mommie and adorable children." The St. Louis County coroner's jury gathered at the Busch mansion and heard Busch's chauffeur testify to the events of August's suicide. A Dr. P.E. Rutledge of Kirkwood also testified that he had given Busch morphine seven hours before the suicide. The coroner's jury ruled August's death a suicide due to long illness.

Thousands of people mourned August at the Busch mansion, including senators and brewers. Busch's lawyer, Daniel N. Kirby said during the service, "As worthy son of a noble father, he was as great a leader in saving the industry as his father had been in creating it." Although his parents are buried in a mausoleum at Bellefontaine Cemetery, August wished to be buried at Sunset Burial Park, near Grant's Farm in St. Louis. St. Louis police had to keep crowds away from August's grave.

In 1947, his widow Alice Busch donated $70,000 to help with the purchase of the August A. Busch Memorial Conservation Area, as a memorial to her husband.

== See also ==
- Adolph Coors, brewer in Colorado
