= Gussie Busch =

American businessman (1899–1989)

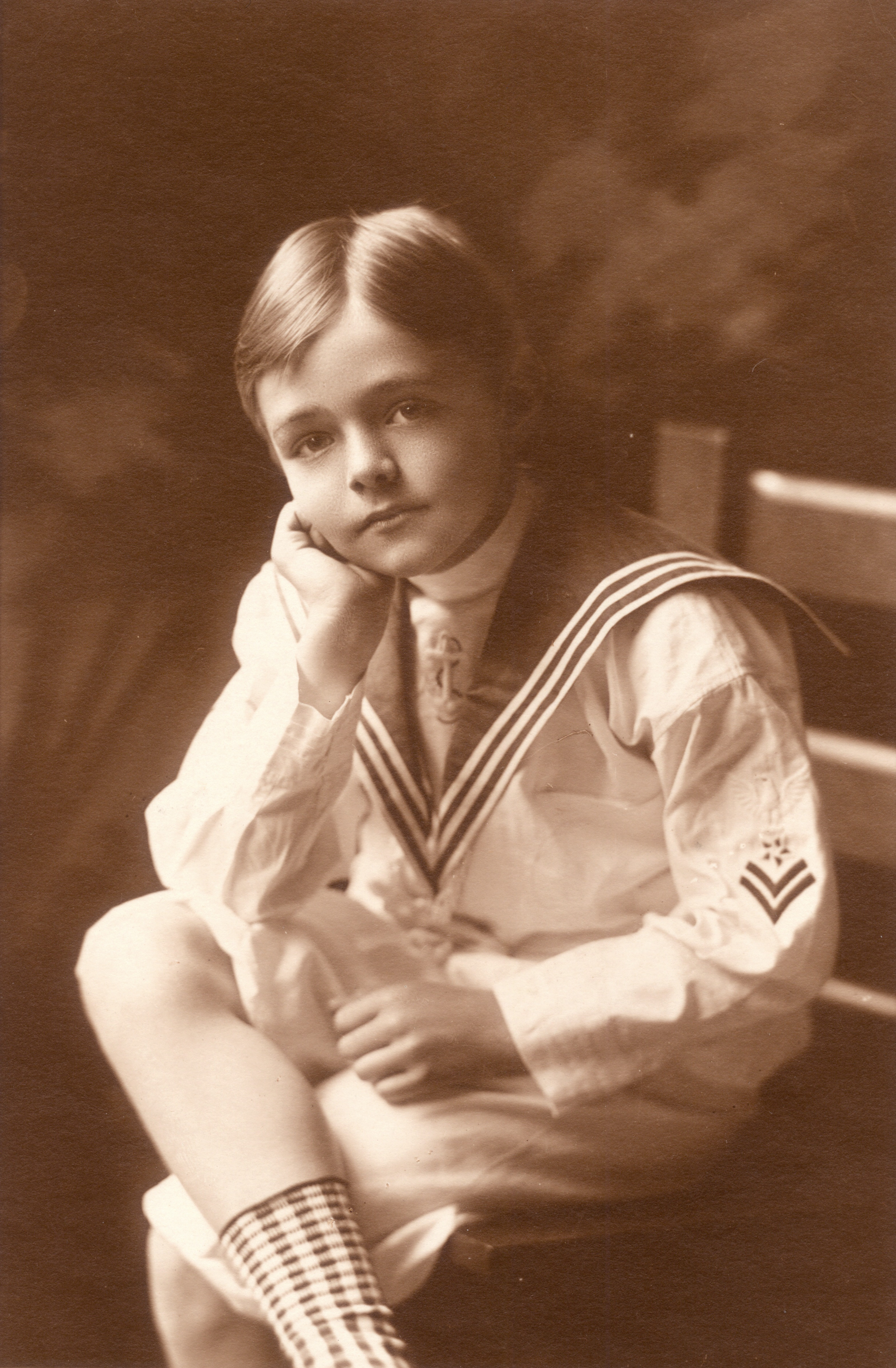
- August A. Busch Jr.
- Born: August Anheuser Busch Jr. March 28, 1899; St. Louis, Missouri, U.S.
- Died: September 29, 1989 (aged 90); St. Louis, Missouri, U.S.
- Occupation: Brewing executive
- Spouses: Marie Church Busch; Elizabeth Overton Busch; Gertrude Buholzer Busch; Margaret Rohde
- Children: 10, including August Busch III
- Parent: August Anheuser Busch Sr.
- Relatives: Adolphus Busch (paternal grandfather)
- Awards: St. Louis Cardinals No. 85 retired St. Louis Cardinals Hall of Fame

August Anheuser "Gussie" Busch Jr. (March 28, 1899 – September 29, 1989) was an American brewing magnate who built the Anheuser-Busch into the largest brewery in the world by 1957; he served as company chairman from 1946 to 1975.

Busch became a prominent sportsman as owner of the St. Louis Cardinals franchise in Major League Baseball from 1953 until his death. The Cardinals inducted him into the team Hall of Fame in 2014.

== Early life ==
August Anheuser Busch Jr. was born on March 28, 1899, in St. Louis, Missouri. His father was August Anheuser Busch Sr., the president of Anheuser-Busch. His mother was Alice Zisemann. His paternal grandfather, Adolphus Busch, was the German-born founder of Anheuser-Busch.

Wilhelmina Busch (1884–1952) was his aunt. She commissioned the construction of Schloss Höhenried in Bernried in Bavaria in 1937.

== Career ==
=== Anheuser-Busch ===
After learning the family business, Busch became superintendent of Anheuser-Busch brewing operations in 1924 and head of the brewing division after his father's death in 1934. After his older brother Adolphus Busch III died in 1946, August A. Jr. succeeded him as president and CEO.

August Busch led the company to become the largest brewery in the world by 1957, surpassing previous leaders Pabst Brewing Company and Joseph Schlitz Brewing Company. He expanded from a single brewery in St. Louis to nine nationwide. By 1973, Anheuser-Busch had annual "aggregate beer sales of 26,522,000 barrels". In 1964, production at the St. Louis facility alone reached the ten million barrels-per-year mark.

Described as a showman and salesman, Busch began using the Clydesdale horse-and-wagon team in 1933, putting them into service to commemorate the end of Prohibition by having a team "haul the first case of Budweiser down Pennsylvania Avenue for delivery to President Franklin D. Roosevelt at the White House". He made their image part of the company logo and had them appear regularly at public events.

In May 1975, Busch was forced to step down as CEO and chairman of the company after a boardroom coup led by his son, August Busch III. In prior months, he had become increasingly difficult to work with due to his grief over the loss of his youngest daughter at the end of 1974. He was allowed to remain president of the Cardinals and use the company perks associated with that job only if he represented the move as voluntary on his part.

A year after being forced out, Busch considered working with the R. J. Reynolds Tobacco Company on a hostile takeover in an attempt to regain his leadership, but decided he could not be the one to take the company away from the family, a move that was not made public for ten years. The extent to which Busch had been sidelined was not publicly known during his lifetime. Divisions in the Busch family resulting from the coup persisted for decades and played a part in InBev's 2008 takeover of the company.

=== St. Louis Cardinals ===
Gussie Busch's number 85 was retired by the St. Louis Cardinals in 1984.

In 1953, Cardinals owner Fred Saigh was convicted of tax evasion. Facing almost certain banishment from baseball, he put the Cardinals up for sale. When Busch got word that Saigh was considering selling the team to interests who would move the team to Houston, he decided to have Anheuser-Busch get into the bidding in order to keep the Cardinals in St. Louis.

Ultimately, Anheuser-Busch bought the Cardinals for $3.75 million–somewhat less than what Saigh was being offered by the Houston suitors. It has long been believed that Busch convinced Saigh that civic pride was more important than money. In truth, according to Anheuser-Busch biographer William Knoedelseder, Saigh's first preference had been to sell to local buyers. Busch had been the first credible buyer who was willing to keep the team in town.

As chairman, president or CEO of the Cardinals from the time the club was purchased by the brewery in 1953 until his death, Busch oversaw a team that won six National League pennants (1964, 1967, 1968, 1982, 1985, and 1987) and three World Series (1964, 1967 and 1982).

Although the Cardinals were the dominant baseball team in St. Louis, they did not own their own ballpark. Since 1920, they had rented Sportsman's Park from the St. Louis Browns of the American League. Shortly after buying the Cardinals, Busch bought and extensively renovated the park, renaming it Busch Stadium (but only after a failed attempt to rename it as Budweiser Stadium). The team played there until Busch Memorial Stadium opened in May 1966.

In 1984, the Cardinals retired a number, 85, in Busch's honor, which was his age at the time.

== Personal life ==
Busch married four times, having a total of 11 children. Two of his marriages ended in divorce. His third wife, Gertrude Buholzer (1927–2016), a native of Switzerland, was a Roman Catholic. Their seven children were raised in their mother's faith, and Busch was later received into that church, although the union was dissolved in 1978. His fourth wife, the former Margaret Rohde, died in 1988.

His youngest child, by Gertrude Buholzer, daughter Christina Martina Busch, died at the age of eight in a car accident while on her way home from school in December 1974.

At the time of his death, his surviving children were Carlota Busch Giersch and Lilly Busch Hermann (wife of Bob Hermann), both daughters of Marie Church Busch; August A. Busch III and Elizabeth Busch Burke (wife of Baseball Hall of Famer Eddie Mathews), both children of Elizabeth Overton Busch; and Adolphus A. Busch III, Beatrice Busch von Gontard, Peter W. Busch, Trudy Busch Valentine, William K. "Billy" Busch, and Andrew D. Busch, all six the children of Gertrude Buholzer Busch.

== Death and legacy ==
Busch died in St. Louis on September 29, 1989, at age 90, of pneumonia.

Fred Kuhlman took over as Cardinals team president. Seven years later in 1996, Anheuser-Busch sold the Cardinals to a group of investors led by William DeWitt Jr.

In 2014, the Cardinals announced Busch would be among 22 former players and personnel to be inducted into the St. Louis Cardinals Hall of Fame Museum for the inaugural class of 2014.

== See also ==
- List of St. Louis Cardinals owners and executives
- St. Louis Cardinals Hall of Fame Museum
