= List of Washington University alumni =

The following persons are notable alumni, living and deceased, of Washington University in St. Louis.

== Academia ==
=== College or university presidents ===
- James F. Barker (AM 1973): former president of Clemson University
- Rebecca Ehretsman (MA): 18th president of Wartburg College
- Thomas Lamb Eliot (AB 1862, AM 1866): founding board member and president of Reed College
- Deborah Freund (AB 1973): president of Claremont Graduate University
- Barry Glassner (MA, PHD): 24th president of Lewis & Clark College
- Nathan O. Hatch (AM 1972, PhD 1974): president emeritus of Wake Forest University
- Edward S. Holden (SB 1866): fifth president of the University of California; director of the Lick Observatory
- Joyce Ladner (AM 1966, PhD 1968): sociologist, civil rights activist and interim president of Howard University
- Walter E. Massey (AM 1966, PhD 1966): physicist, director of the National Science Foundation, president of Morehouse College
- Horace Mitchell (AB 1968, MA 1969, PhD 1974): president of California State University Bakersfield
- Daniel Nathans (MD 1954): former president of Johns Hopkins University
- H. Richard Niebuhr (AM 1917): theologian, former president of Elmhurst College and professor at Yale University
- Larry Robinson (PhD 1984): academic, administrator, chemist and the current President of Florida A&M University
- Abram L. Sachar (AB 1920, AM 1920): founding president of Brandeis University
- Kim Schatzel (BS 1978): 19th president of University of Louisville
- Song Ja (MBA 1962, DBA 1967): former president of Yonsei University and Myongji University; South Korean Minister of Education
- Samuel Stanley (MD 1980): fifth president of Stony Brook University
- Woo Chia-wei (MA, PhD): founding president of The Hong Kong University of Science and Technology; first Asian American president of a major U.S. university (San Francisco State University)

=== Professors ===
- Francis J. Beckwith (MJS): professor and associate director of the graduate program in philosophy at Baylor University
- Jessie Bernard (PhD 1935): sociologist; feminist scholar, professor at Pennsylvania State University
- Judson A. Brewer (PhD 2002, MD 2004): neuroscientist and psychiatrist, director of research and innovation at Brown University's Mindfulness Center and professor at Brown University
- William M. Bugg (PhD 1959): professor at the University of Tennessee and fellow of the American Physical Society
- Ewald W. Busse (M.D.): professor at Duke University and president of the American Psychiatric Association
- Elizabeth A. Craig: biochemistry professor at University of Wisconsin–Madison; member of the National Academy of Sciences
- Keith Crandall (PhD 1993): founding director of the Computational Biology Institute and professor at George Washington University
- Lorrie Cranor (BS 1992, MS 1993, MS 1996, D.Sc. 1996): professor at Carnegie Mellon University; served as chief technologist at the Federal Trade Commission
- Carolyn S. Gordon (PhD 1979): Benjamin Cheney Professor of Mathematics at Dartmouth College
- Kenneth I. Gross (PhD 1966): mathematician, professor at University of Vermont and University of North Carolina at Chapel Hill
- Raelynn Hillhouse (AB): novelist, political scientist, national security expert, professor at University of Michigan and University of Hawaiʻi at Mānoa
- Barbara Krauthamer (MA 1994): African-American historian, professor at New York University and University of Massachusetts Amherst, dean of the College of Arts and Sciences at Emory University
- Lauren Krivo (AB 1978): professor of sociology at Rutgers University
- Richard Lischer (MA 1967): theologian and professor at Duke Divinity School
- Donald Livingston (PhD 1965): professor of philosophy at Emory University and constitutional scholar
- John L. Loos (PhD c. 1953): historian and professor at Louisiana State University, researcher of the Lewis and Clark Expedition
- Richard V. E. Lovelace (BS Physics 1964): astrophysicist and plasma physicist at Cornell University
- Julius B. Maller (AB 1925): professor of psychology at Yeshiva University
- Richard McKelvey (MA 1967): political scientist, specialized in mathematical theories of voting and Edie and Lew Wasserman Professor of Political Science at the California Institute of Technology
- William E. Moerner (BS, AB 1975): Nobel Prize-winning chemical physicist, professor at Stanford University
- Jonathan D. Moreno (PhD 1977): David and Lyn Silfen University Professor, University of Pennsylvania
- Bruce Ovbiagele (MLS 2021): professor of Neurology and associate dean at the University of California, San Francisco and Editor-in-Chief of the Journal of the American Heart Association
- Eugene B. Redmond (AM 1966): poet and professor emeritus at Southern Illinois University Edwardsville
- Maurice H. Rees: medical educator, professor at University of Colorado Boulder, and dean of University of Colorado School of Medicine 1925–1945
- Bruce Rittmann (B.S., M.S. 1974): Regents' Professor at Arizona State University
- Carmen Rivera de Alvarado (MSW 1944), social worker and professor at the University of Puerto Rico
- Elizabeth Scarlett (AB 1983): author of books on Spanish literature and film, professor at University at Buffalo
- Pepper Schwartz (AB 1967, MA 1969): sociologist, sexologist, and professor at the University of Washington
- Hollis Taylor: author and musicologist at Macquarie University
- Thea Tlsty (PhD 1980): professor of pathology at the University of California, San Francisco
- William "Bill" Warren (physicist), (Ph.D. 1965), professor emeritus at Oregon State University
- L. Randell Wray (MA, PhD): economist associated with modern monetary theory and professor of economics at Bard College
- Ellen W. Zegura (BS 1987, MS 1990, D.Sc. 1993): professor at Georgia Tech
- Jacquelyn Zita (BA, PhD): former professor of Gender, Women and Sexuality Studies at University of Minnesota

== Arts, including literature ==
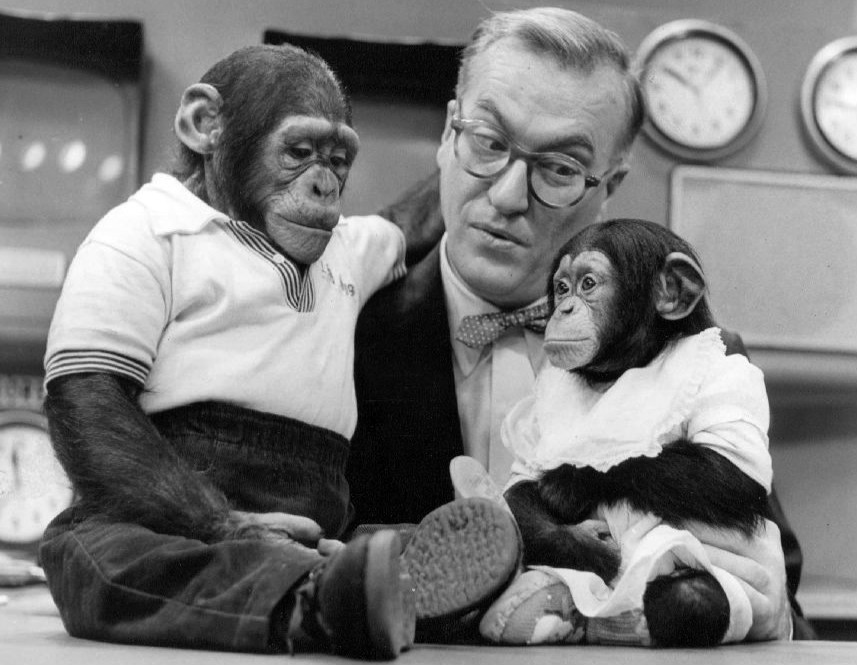
Dave Garroway, the founding host of The Today Show

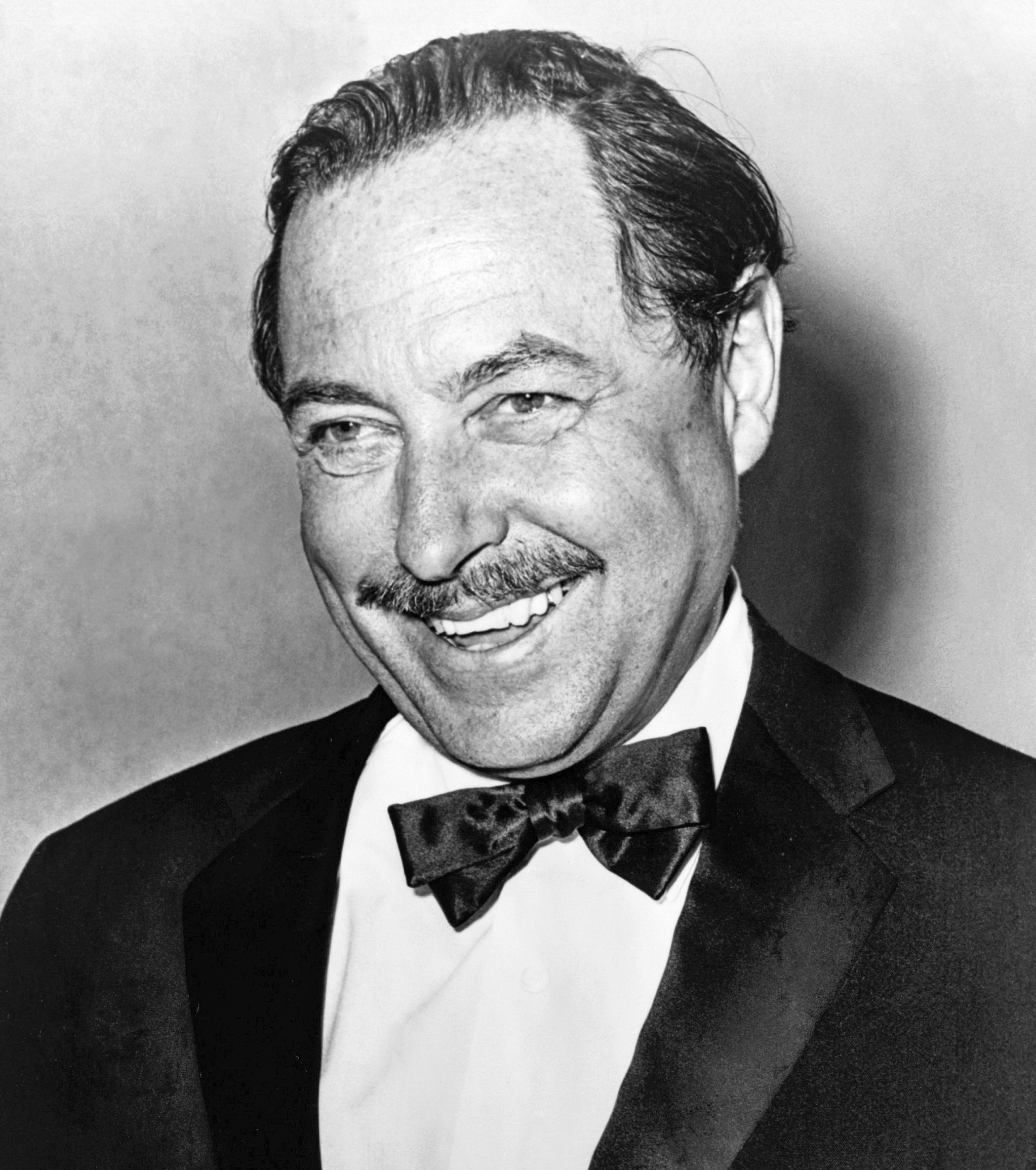
Playwright Tennessee Williams

=== A–M ===
- Ericka Beckman (BFA 1974): filmmaker
- Deanne Bell (BS 2002): host of Discovery Channel's Smash Lab and PBS's Design Squad
- Suessa Baldridge Blaine: writer of temperance pageants
- Morris Carnovsky (AB): stage and film actor
- Steve Carver (MFA): film director
- Douglass Crockwell (BS 1926): commercial artist and experimental filmmaker
- Larry Cuba (AB 1972): animator
- Robert Culp (attended): television actor
- Patricia Degener: artist
- Kyle DeWoody (BA 2007): gallery owner
- Anita Diamant (AB 1973): novelist
- Doug Dillard: bluegrass musician, banjo player for the Dillards
- Song Ja (MBA 1962, DBA 1967): former president of Yonsei University and Myongji University; South Korean Minister of Education
- Sean Douglas (LA 2005): multi-platinum songwriter and producer
- Richard Eastham (studied prior to World War II): actor
- Henry Ware Eliot (AB 1863): father of poet T. S. Eliot; former president of the Academy of Sciences of St. Louis
- George Pearse Ennis: painter and watercolorist
- Lillie Rose Ernst: leader of The Potters, an artistic group in early 20th-century St. Louis
- Jon Feltheimer (AB 1972): CEO of Lionsgate Films
- Emily Fridlund: author of History of Wolves
- Tom Friedman (BFA 1988): conceptual sculptor
- Bernie Fuchs (MFA 1954): painter and illustrator
- Richa Gangopadhyay (MBA 2017): actress
- John Gardner (AB 1955): novelist
- Dave Garroway (AB 1936): Today Show host
- Cheryl Goldsleger (MFA 1975): artist
- Alicia Graf Mack (MA): dancer
- Elizabeth Graver (MFA 1999): novelist
- Robert Guillaume: stage and television actor
- Gustave Haenschen: pianist, composer, recording director (Brunswick Records), orchestral conductor and radio executive
- Garth Risk Hallberg (MFA 2001): novelist
- Henry Hampton (AB 1961): filmmaker; producer of PBS civil rights documentary Eyes on the Prize
- John Hartford: bluegrass fiddler and banjo player
- Edmund Hartmann: film and television writer and producer
- Veronica Helfensteller: painter and printer
- Ronald Himes: theatrical producer, director, and actor
- Ann Hirsch (BFA 2007): artist
- A. E. Hotchner (AB 1940, JD 1940): biographer and novelist (Papa Hemingway, King of the Hill)
- Fannie Hurst (AB 1909): writer and social activist
- Josephine Johnson (student 1926–1931): Pulitzer Prize-winning author
- Roland C. Jordan: composer and music theorist
- Stan Kann (AB 1946): theater organist
- Johnny Kastl (AB, 1997): television actor (Scrubs)
- Hank Klibanoff (AB 1971): author and Pulitzer Prize winner
- Zander Lehmann (AB 2009): creator, writer, and producer of the TV show Casual
- Caryn Mandabach (AB 1970): Emmy award-winning television and film producer of the Cosby Show
- Shepherd Mead (AB 1936): playwright (How To Succeed in Business Without Really Trying)
- David Merrick (AB 1934): Broadway producer
- Creighton Michael (MFA): abstract artist
- Marvin Miller: actor, voice actor, radio announcer, multiple time winner of Grammy Award for Best Children's Music Album
- Ian Monroe (BFA 1995): visual artist

=== N–Z ===
- Oliver Nelson (student 1954–1957): jazz musician and composer
- David McCheyne Newell: naturalist, writer
- Frank Nuderscher: American Impressionist painter and muralist
- Al Parker (student 1923–28): illustrator
- J. D. Parran (AM 1971): jazz musician
- Ebony Patterson (MFA 2006): visual artist
- Sandra Payne (BFA): visual artist
- Mike Peters (BFA 1965): Pulitzer-winning political cartoonist, creator of Mother Goose and Grimm
- Judy Pfaff (BFA 1971): visual artist
- Dan Piraro (dropped out): cartoonist of Bizarro
- Robert Quine (JD 1968): rock guitarist
- Harold Ramis (AB 1966): film actor, writer and director

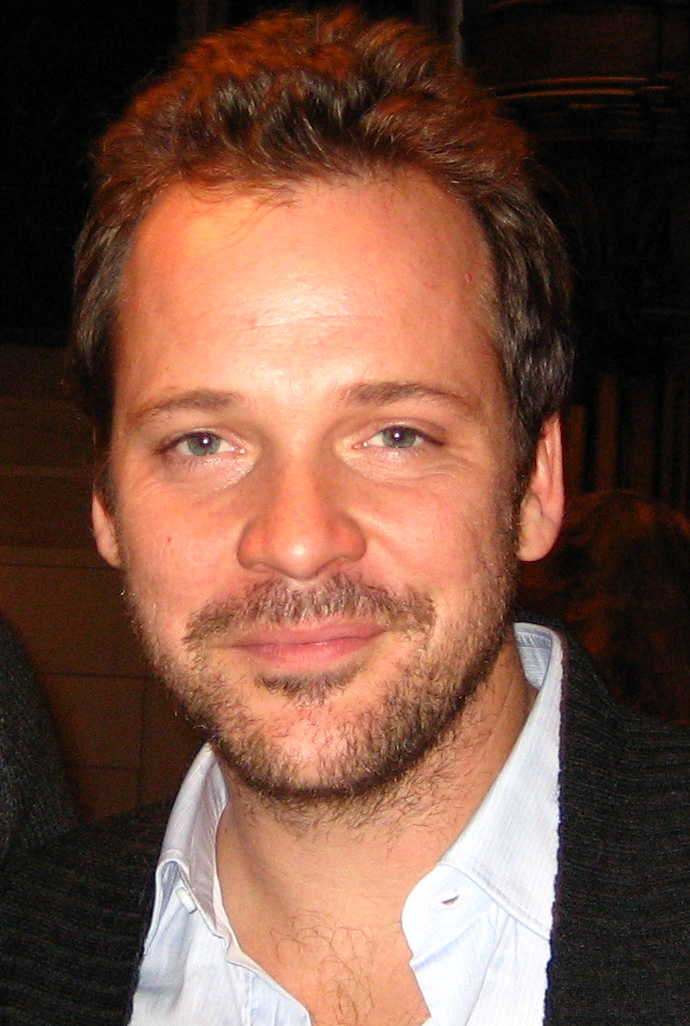
Actor Peter Sarsgaard

- David Ready (BA 2001): film producer, President of Film at Chernin Entertainment
- Eugene B. Redmond (MA 1966): poet, critic, civil-rights activist
- Irma S. Rombauer (AB): co-author of The Joy of Cooking
- Allen Rucker: television writer and novelist
- Peter Sarsgaard (AB 1993): actor
- Steven Sater: Broadway lyricist, playwright, and poet
- Peter Saul (BFA 1956): painter
- Michael Shamberg: video artist, producer
- Jane Sauer (BA 1959): fiber artist, sculptor
- William Jay Smith (AB 1939; MA 1941): nineteenth United States Poet Laureate
- Maxwell Stevens (MFA 1995): painter, visual artist
- Dan Storper (AB ’73): founder and CEO of Putumayo World Music
- Allan Trautman (AB 1976): actor, puppeteer
- Jeff Tremaine (AB 1990): director, producer, and co-creator of MTV's Jackass
- Anne Valente (AB 2003): novelist, short story writer
- Charles van Ravenswaay (AB 1933, AM 1934): historian, first paid director of the Missouri Historical Society
- Kristin Bauer van Straten: television actress on True Blood
- Lauren Weinstein (AB 1998): cartoonist
- June Weybright: composer
- Luke Whisnant (MFA 1982): novelist, short story writer
- Mary Wickes (AB 1930): stage, film, and television actress
- Tennessee Williams (student 1936–37): playwright
- Olly Wilson (AB 1959): composer
- Ben H. Winters (BA 1998): author, playwright, screenwriter
- Qiu Xiaolong (MA 1993) (PhD 1995): crime novelist, English-language poet, literary translator, critic, and academic

== Architecture and design ==
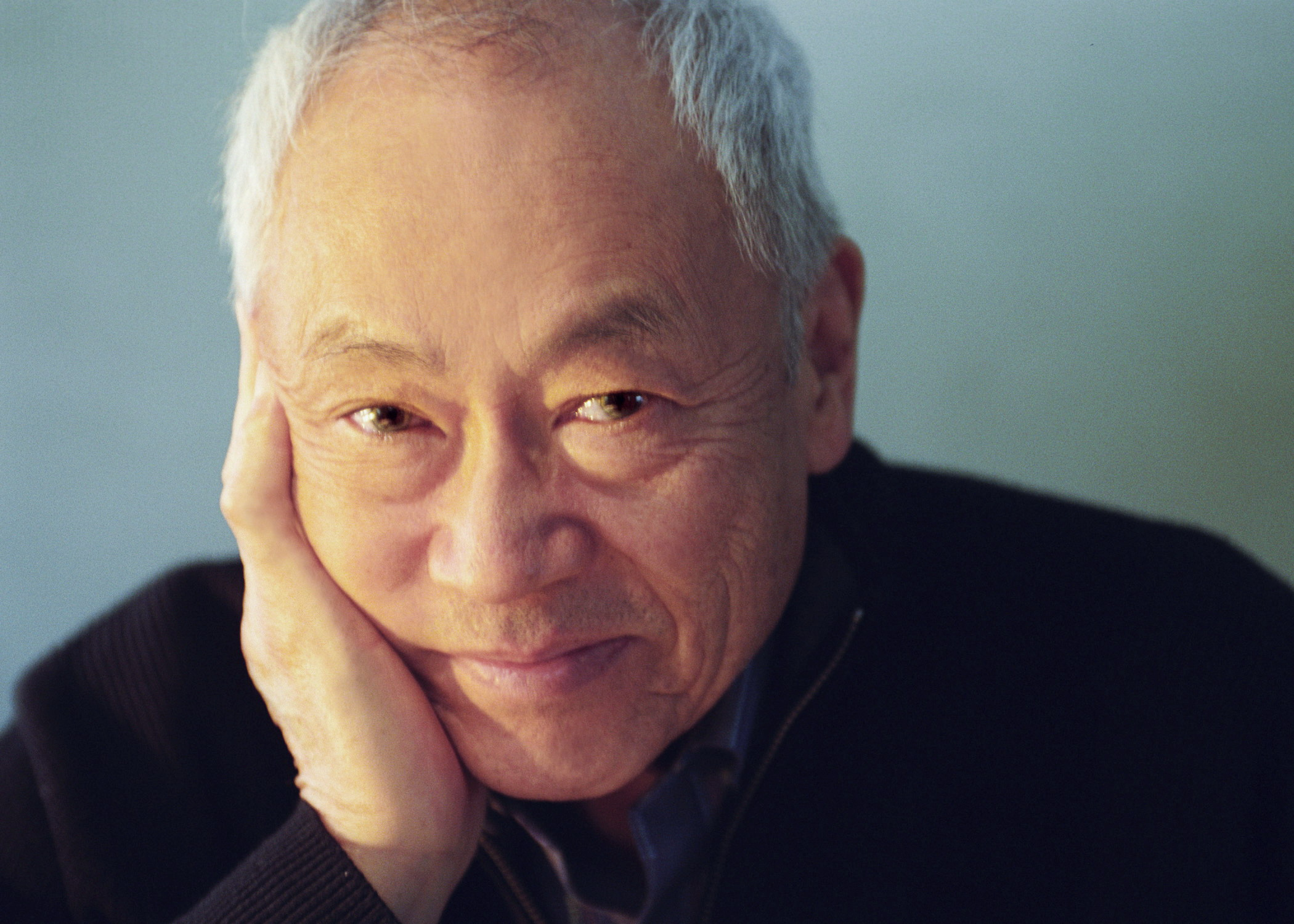
Architect Gyo Obata

- Marshall Brown, professor of architecture at Princeton University
- Charles Eames: designer, architect, filmmaker
- Hugh Ferriss (B.Arch 1911, M.Arch 1928): architect
- Tom Friedman (BFA 1988): conceptual sculptor, artist
- Alan Goldberg (1954): architect
- Walker Hancock: sculptor, 1989 National Medal of Arts winner
- Gyo Obata (B.Arch 1945): architect; co-founder and chairman of Hellmuth, Obata & Kassabaum
- James F. O'Gorman (B.Arch 1956): architectural historian and author
- Carlos Ott (M.Arch 1972): Uruguayan-Canadian architect of the Opéra Bastille
- C. P. Wang (M.Arch 1973): architect for Taipei 101, the world's tallest building as of 2005

== Business ==
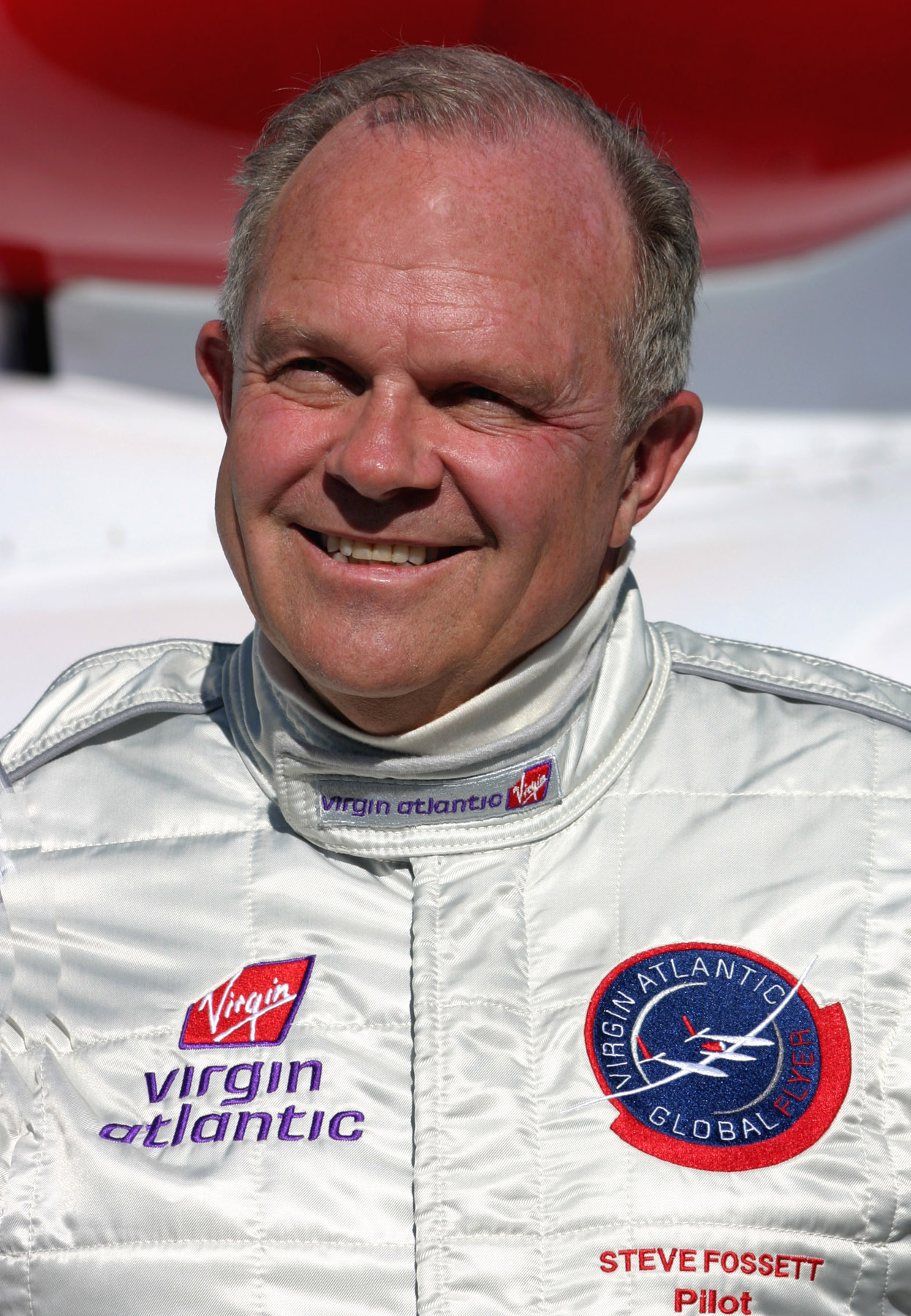
Adventurer and businessman Steve Fossett

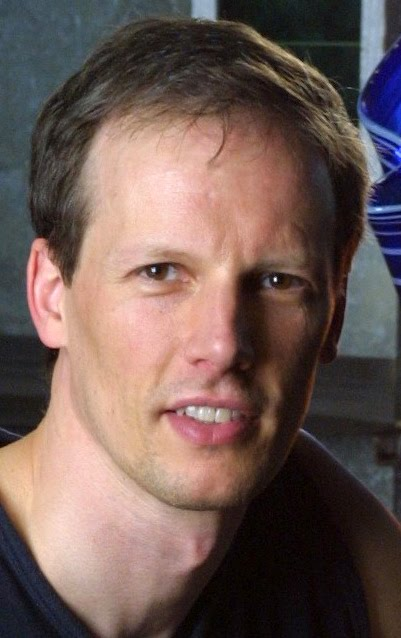
Jim McKelvey, co-founder and director of Block, Inc.

- Fahd Al-Rasheed (BSBA): CEO of the Royal Commission for Riyadh City
- John H. Biggs (PhD): former CEO of TIAA-CREF
- Nordahl Brue (JD): founder of Bruegger's Bagels and Board of Trustees member at Grinnell College
- Donald L. Bryant Jr. (JD 1967): owner of Bryant Family Vineyard
- Maxine Clark: founder of Build-A-Bear Workshop
- William H. Danforth (AB 1892): founder of Ralston Purina
- Morgan DeBaun (BA): founder and CEO of Blavity, Inc
- Arnold W. Donald (BSME 1977): CEO of Carnival Cruise Line; former CEO of Merisant
- Yinka Faleti (JD): former executive director of the nonprofit Forward Through Ferguson and senior vice president of United Way of Greater St. Louis
- Aria Finger (BA 2005): CEO of nonprofit DoSomething, president of TMI Agency
- Lee Fixel: billionaire venture capitalist, founder of Addition
- Steve Fossett (MBA 1968): options trader, balloonist, and adventurer
- Sam Fox (BSBA 1951): founder, chairman, CEO, and owner of Harbour Group Industries
- Avram Glazer (BSBA 1982): president and CEO of the Zapata Corporation and joint chairman of Manchester United
- Robert Hernreich (AB 1967): co-owner of Sacramento Kings, Swansea City A.F.C.
- Sai Sam Htun (MBA 2008): founder of Loi Hein Company, Owner of Yadanarbon FC
- Bruce Levenson (AB 1971): owner of Atlanta Hawks
- Doug Lowenstein (AB 1973): founder and former president of Entertainment Software Association, former president and CEO of American Investment Council
- John F. McDonnell: former chairman and CEO of McDonnell Douglas (Now Boeing)
- Sanford N. McDonnell: former CEO of McDonnell Douglas
- Jim McKelvey (AB 1987): co-founder and director of Block, Inc.
- Wade Miquelon (MBA 1989): former executive vice president of Walgreens and former president and CEO of Jo-Ann Stores
- Charles Nagel (JD 1872): United States Secretary of Commerce and Labor; founder of the U.S. Chamber of Commerce
- James Busch Orthwein: former Anheuser-Busch board of directors 1963–2001, former owner of New England Patriots
- Dave Peacock (MBA 2000): former CEO of Anheuser-Busch and former president of Schnucks
- Andrew Puzder (JD 1978): CEO of CKE Restaurants
- Michael L. Riordan (AB 1979): founder of Gilead Sciences
- David Rogier (AB): co-founder and CEO of MasterClass
- Aaron Selber Jr.: studied in the School of Retailing; businessman and philanthropist in Shreveport, Louisiana
- William Shaw (MBA 1972): president and COO of Marriott International
- Kevin Sheekey (BA 1988): Global Head of Communications, Government Relations and Marketing for Bloomberg L.P.
- Karen Sheriff (BA 1979): president and CEO of Q9 Networks Inc.
- Luther Ely Smith (JD 1897): founder of Gateway Arch National Park
- George Fox Steedman (1871–1940): inventor and businessman
- Louis Susman (JD 1962): vice chairman of Citigroup Global Markets
- Jack C. Taylor (student through 1944): founder of Enterprise Rent-A-Car; no. 14 on Forbes' 400 Richest Americans in 2006
- Jim Weddle (AB 1977, MBA): managing partner at Edward Jones Investments
- John B. Whyte (attended two years in 1950s): developer of Fire Island Pines, New York
- Lewis Wolff (MBA 1961): hotel developer and owner of the Oakland Athletics
- George Zimmer (AB 1970): founder of Men's Wearhouse

== Journalism and media ==
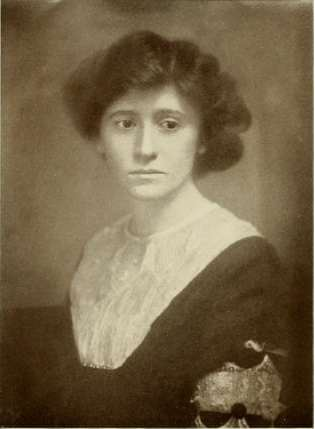
Reporter and artist Marguerite Martyn

- Bill Dedman (student 1978–1981): Pulitzer Prize-winning investigative reporter and author of bestseller Empty Mansions
- Jonathan Greenberger (AB 2005): global editor-in-chief, Politico.
- Lynne Cooper Harvey (AB, AM): producer of Paul Harvey News; inducted into the Radio Hall of Fame
- William G. Hyland (BA): editor of Foreign Affairs (1984–1992), Deputy National Security Advisor to President Gerald Ford (1975–1977)
- Michael Isikoff (AB 1974): author and investigative journalist
- Richard F. Janssen (BA 1954): journalist who received a Gerald Loeb Award in 1961
- Sarah Kendzior (PhD 2012): author and journalist
- Hank Klibanoff (AB 1971): Pulitzer Prize-winning author, director of the Georgia Civil Rights Cold Cases Project, and former managing editor of Atlanta Journal-Constitution
- Anthony Kuhn (AB 1985): NPR correspondent in Beijing, China
- Max Lerner (AM 1925): intellectual, critic, and author
- Marguerite Martyn (ca. 1880–1948): reporter and artist
- Luke Epplin (BA): sportswriter and author
- Condé Nast (LLB 1897): publisher of Vogue
- Eric P. Newman (JD 1935): numismatist
- Mike Peters (BFA 1965): Pulitzer Prize-winning editorial cartoonist; creator of "Mother Goose and Grimm"
- Ben H. Winters (BA 1998): author, playwright, screenwriter

== Government ==
Note: individuals who belong in multiple sections appear in the most relevant section.

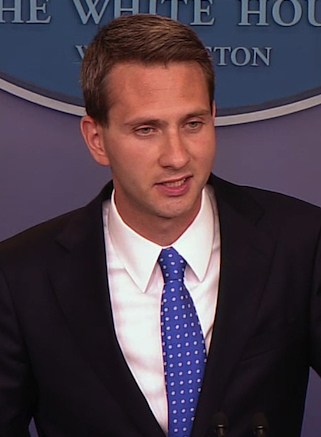
Eric Schultz, Deputy White House Press Secretary in the Obama Administration 2014–2017

=== U.S. cabinet secretaries and other prominent federal government officials ===
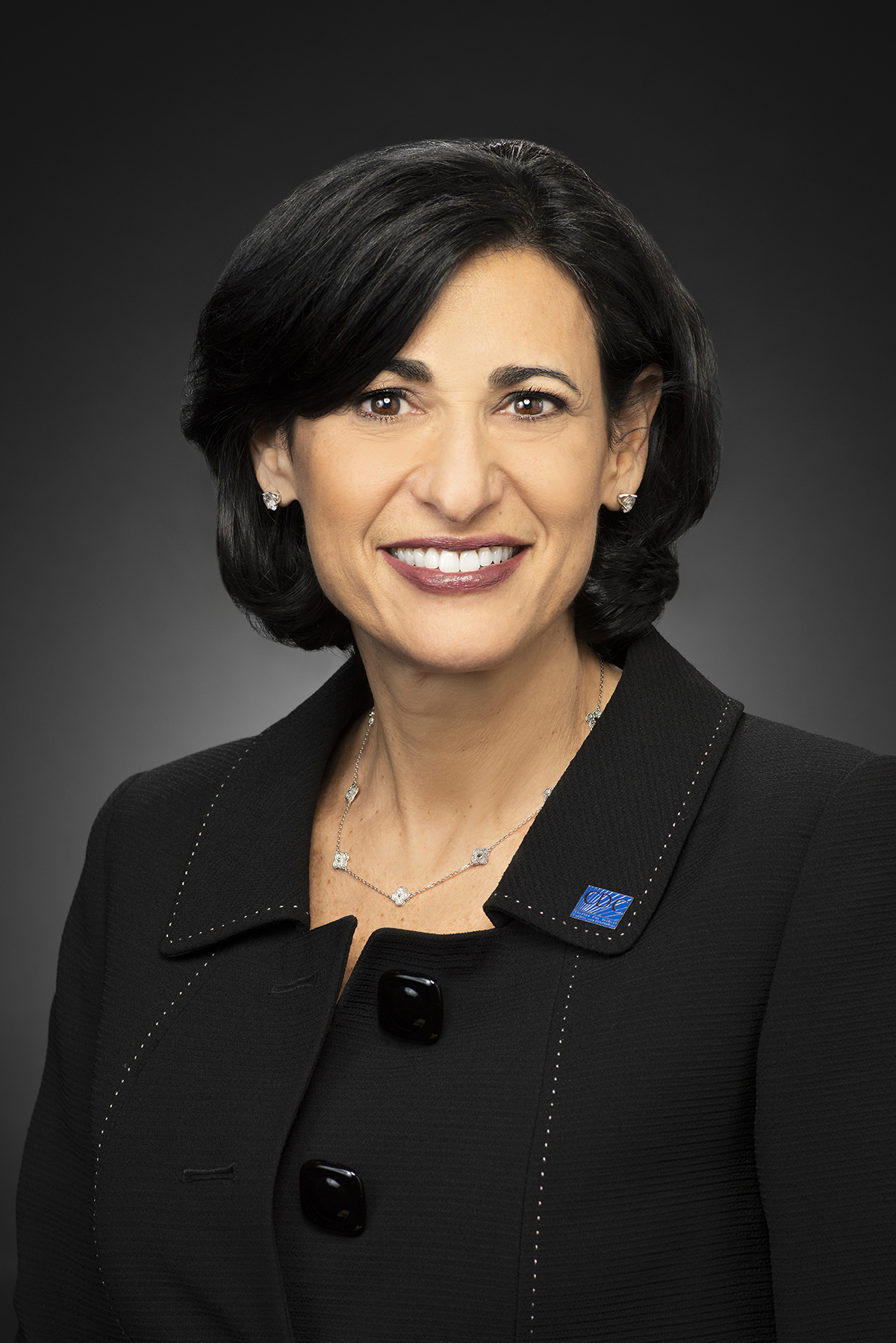
CDC Director Rochelle Walensky

- Carl J. Artman (JD): Assistant Secretary of the Interior for Indian Affairs, and head of the Bureau of Indian Affairs 2007–08
- John C. Bates (BA 1863): served as Chief of Staff of the United States Army in 1906
- Brian Benczkowski (JD 1994): former Assistant Attorney General for the Criminal Division of the United States Department of Justice
- Clark Clifford (LLB 1928): U.S. Secretary of Defense, 1968–69; former presidential advisor
- Dwight F. Davis (LLB): founder of Davis Cup, and 49th U.S. Secretary of War
- David R. Francis (AB 1870): mayor of St. Louis, 1885–89; Governor of Missouri, 1889–93; U.S. Secretary of Interior, 1896–97; U.S. Ambassador to Russia
- William G. Hyland (BA): editor of Foreign Affairs (1984–1992), Deputy National Security Advisor to President Gerald Ford (1975–1977)
- Alphonso Jackson (JD 1972): U.S. Secretary of Housing and Urban Development, 2004–2008
- Jonathan Kanter (JD): assistant attorney general for the Antitrust Division of the U.S. Department of Justice
- Andrew McCabe (JD 1993): deputy director of the FBI
- Charles Nagel (JD 1872): United States Secretary of Commerce and Labor; founder of the U.S. Chamber of Commerce
- Kris Sarri (BA): nominee for Assistant Secretary of State for Oceans and International Environmental and Scientific Affairs
- Eric Schultz (BA 2002): Deputy White House Press Secretary, 2014–2017
- Rochelle Walensky (BA 1991): director of the Centers for Disease Control and Prevention
- William H. Webster (JD 1949): 14th director of the CIA and the 6th director of the FBI

=== U.S. governors and lieutenant governors ===
- Henry S. Caulfield (JD 1895): governor of Missouri, 1929–1933
- Alexander Monroe Dockery (MD 1865): governor of Missouri, 1901–1905
- Ken Rothman (AB, JD): lieutenant governor of Missouri, 1981–1985
- James R. Thompson (AB 1956): governor of Illinois, 1977–1991
- S.B. Woo (PhD 1964): Asian American political activist; former lieutenant governor of Delaware

=== U.S. senators ===
- Alan J. Dixon (LLB 1949): U.S. senator from Illinois, 1981–93
- Harry B. Hawes (JD 1896): U.S. senator from Missouri, 1926–1933
- Chic Hecht (BS 1949): U.S. senator from Nevada, 1983–89
- Thomas C. Hennings Jr. (JD 1926): U.S. senator from Missouri, 1951–1960
- Roscoe C. Patterson (JD 1897): U.S. senator from Missouri, 1929–1935
- Ralph Tyler Smith (JD 1940): U.S. senator from Illinois, 1969–1970
- Selden P. Spencer (JD 1886): U.S. senator from Missouri, 1918–1925
- Jim Talent (AB 1978): U.S. senator from Missouri, 2003–2007
- Xenophon P. Wilfley (JD 1899): U.S. senator from Missouri, 1918
- George H. Williams (JD 1897): U.S. senator from Missouri, 1925–1926

=== U.S. representatives ===
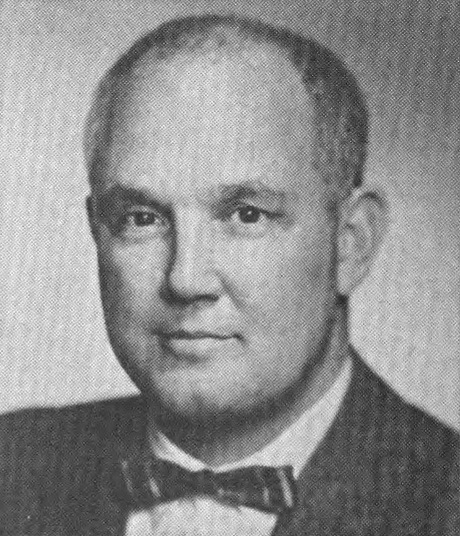
Thomas Bradford Curtis (LLB 1935), primary driver behind the Civil Rights Act of 1964

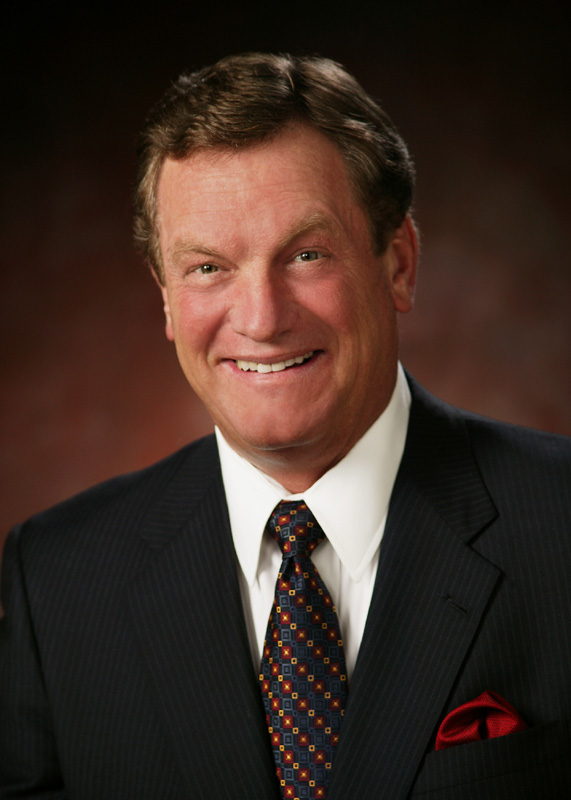
Mike Simpson (DMD 1977), politician and dentist

- James Joseph Butler (JD): member of the U.S. House of Representatives from Missouri's 12th congressional district
- Tom Coleman (JD 1969): U.S. congressman from Missouri, 1977–1993
- Thomas Bradford Curtis (LLB 1935): primary driver behind the Civil Rights Act of 1964 and member of the U.S. House of Representatives from Missouri
- Hal Daub (BS 1963): U.S. congressman from Nebraska, 1981–1989; mayor of Omaha, 1995–2001
- Leonidas C. Dyer (JD 1893): U.S. congressman from Missouri, 1915–1933
- James F. Fulbright (born 1877): U.S. representative from Missouri
- William L. Igoe (JD 1902): U.S. congressman from Missouri, 1913–1921
- Christian Menefee (JD 2013): U.S. congressman from Texas, 2026–present
- Abner Mikva (BA 1948): U.S. representative for Illinois's 10th congressional district, 1975–1979; U.S. representative for Illinois's 2nd congressional district, 1969–1973
- Steve Rothman (JD 1977): U.S. congressman from New Jersey, 1997–2013
- Mike Simpson (DMD 1977): U.S. congressman from Idaho, 1999–present
- Leonor Sullivan (1923): first female U.S. congressional representative from Missouri, 1953–1977

=== State legislators and city officials ===
- Sherman Block (BS): 29th sheriff of Los Angeles County, California, 1982–1988
- Ben Cannon (AB 1999): state representative to the Oregon House of Representatives, 2007–2011, and Rhodes Scholar
- Ethan Corson (BS, JD): member of the Kansas Senate from the 7th district, 2021–present
- Charles L. Craig (1872–1935): New York City Comptroller
- Daniel Draper (JD): Speaker of the Oklahoma House of Representatives, 1979–1983
- Jason Doucette (BA): member of the Connecticut House of Representatives
- Rocky Fitzsimmons: member of the West Virginia Senate
- John Hayden Jr.: police commissioner of the St. Louis Police Department
- Lawrence J. Lee: majority floor leader for the Missouri Senate for the 77th and 78th General Assemblies
- James Newsom (JD 2002): member of the New Hampshire House of Representatives, 2025–present
- Tony Ribaudo (1962): majority leader of the Missouri House of Representatives, 1977–1997
- Tana Senn (BA): representative for the 41st legislative district in the Washington House of Representatives since 2013
- Jeff Smith (PhD 2004): member of the Missouri Senate from the 4th district, 2007–2009

=== Mayors and county executives ===
- Albert I Beach (JD 1907): 42nd mayor of Kansas City, 1924–1930
- William W. Gullett (BA 1948): 1st county executive of Prince George's County, Maryland, 1971–1974
- Quinton Lucas (BA): mayor of Kansas City, Missouri, 2019–2023
- Victor J. Miller (JD): mayor of St. Louis, 1925–1933
- Raymond Tucker (BS 1920): mayor of St. Louis, 1953–1965

=== Diplomats ===
- Sam Fox (AB 1951): former United States Ambassador to Belgium
- Louis Susman (JD): United States Ambassador to Great Britain, 2009–2013

== Law ==
=== Judges ===
- Glendy B. Arnold: St. Louis judge
- Robert E. Bacharach: judge of the United States Court of Appeals for the Tenth Circuit
- Marion T. Bennett (JD 1938): senior judge of the United States Court of Appeals for the Federal Circuit, 1986–2000
- David Bernhard (JD 1985): judge on the 19th Judicial Circuit Court of Virginia (Fairfax), 2017–present
- Michael Cherry (JD 1969): justice, Supreme Court of Nevada, 2006–present
- Sharon Johnson Coleman (JD 1984): judge of the United States District Court for the Northern District of Illinois
- Irving Ben Cooper (LLB 1925): senior judge of the United States District Court for the Southern District of New York (1972–1996)
- Barbara Ann Crancer (JD): associate circuit judge of the 21st Missouri Circuit Court 1992–2008
- Joseph F. Cunningham (JD 1952): served on the Illinois Supreme Court
- Stephanie D. Davis (JD 1992): first Black woman from Michigan to serve on the United States Court of Appeals for the Sixth Circuit
- Conway Elder (JD 1905): Supreme Court of Missouri justice 1921–1922
- Audrey Goldstein Fleissig (JD 1980): judge of the United States District Court for the Eastern District of Missouri
- Joseph H. Goldenhersh (JD): Illinois Supreme Court judge 1970–1987
- Raymond Gruender (JD/MBA 1987): current judge, United States Court of Appeals for the Eighth Circuit
- George F. Gunn Jr. (JD 1955): Supreme Court of Missouri justice, and later a United States district judge of the United States District Court for the Eastern District of Missouri
- Jean Constance Hamilton (JD 1971): current judge, United States District Court for the Eastern District of Missouri
- Moses Harrison (JD): Illinois Appellate Court and Illinois Supreme Court judge
- Abner Mikva (1948): former chief judge, United States Court of Appeals for the District of Columbia Circuit
- John Francis Nangle (JD 1948): former chief judge, United States District Court for the Eastern District of Missouri, 1983–1990
- Catherine D. Perry (JD 1981): current judge, United States District Court for the Eastern District of Missouri
- Rodney W. Sippel (JD 1980): current judge, United States District Court for the Eastern District of Missouri
- Richard B. Teitelman (JD 1973): justice, Supreme Court of Missouri (2002–2016)

=== Attorneys ===
- Vishal Amin: intellectual property enforcement coordinator
- Lemma Barkeloo: first woman admitted to the Missouri bar and the first woman to try a case in an American court
- Diane E. Beaver: lawyer for US Army and DoD who advocated for torture at the Guantanamo Bay detention camp
- Edward Coke Crow (LLB 1879): 23rd Attorney General of Missouri 1897–1905, advisor to Missouri Governor Lloyd Crow Stark (1937–1941)
- Chris Koster (MBA 2002): Attorney General of Missouri
- Phyllis Schlafly (AB 1944, JD 1978): author, lawyer, conservative and antifeminist activist
- David C. Weiss (1979): current U.S. attorney for the District of Delaware

=== Activists ===
- Phoebe Couzins (LLB 1871): first female U.S. marshal; feminist; leader in the women's suffrage movement
- Phil Radford (BA 1998): environmental, clean energy and democracy leader; executive director, Greenpeace
- Cecilia Razovsky: social worker and leader in Jewish immigration efforts during World War II as part of the National Refugee Service, the United Nations Relief and Rehabilitation Administration, and the American Jewish Joint Distribution Committee
- Adam Shapiro (AB 1993): co-founder of the International Solidarity Movement

=== Other ===
- Tayeb Bouzid (MSCE 1985): Minister of Higher Education and Scientific Research in Algeria
- Edward Cranch Eliot of the Eliot family (AB 1878, LLB 1880, AM 1881): former president of the American Bar Association
- Eilene Galloway (attended from 1923 to 1925), space law researcher and editor
- Sukehiro Hasegawa (PhD 1974): former Special Representative of the Secretary-General for East Timor, May 2004 – September 2006
- Siniša Mali (MBA 1999): Minister of Finance of Serbia
- Jasna Matić (MBA 2001): Minister of Telecommunications and Information Society of Serbia
- Eben Swift: U.S. Army major general
- Jeffrey W. Talley (MLA 88): retired, 32nd chief of Army Reserve (CAR) and 7th commanding general, United States Army Reserve Command (USARC) 2012–2016
- Tarisa Watanagase (PhD): governor of the Bank of Thailand, 2006
- Chen Zhangliang (PhD 1987): vice governor of Guangxi, People's Republic of China

== Science, engineering, and medicine ==
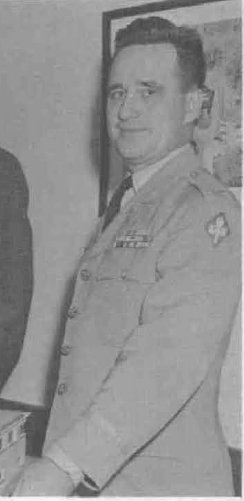
Clyde Cowan, co-discoverer of the neutrino

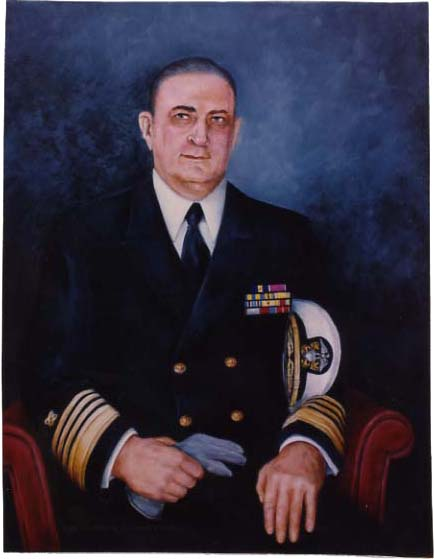
Admiral Ben Moreell

- Richard Askey (BA 1955): mathematician known for his work on special functions
- J. Michael Bailey (AB 1979): psychologist, professor, researcher on sexual orientation
- Geoffrey Ballard (PhD 1963): developed fuel cells; member of Order of Canada; founder of Ballard Power Systems
- Bob Behnken (BSPhy 1992, BSME 1992): NASA astronaut, engineer, and former Chief of the Astronaut Office
- Jasmine Brown (BA 2018): author
- Clyde Cowan (AM, PhD 1949): physicist and co-discoverer of the neutrino
- Arnold W. Donald (BS): president and CEO of Juvenile Diabetes Research Foundation
- Carl Eckart (BS, MS 1923): physicist; member of National Academy of Sciences; known for Wigner-Eckart theorem, Eckart-Young theorem
- Thomas F. Frist Jr. (MD 1965): co-founder of HCA Healthcare, and the wealthiest person in Tennessee
- Eric D. Green (MD PhD 1987): director of the National Human Genome Research Institute
- Philip Gressman (AB 2001): mathematician known for work on harmonic analysis
- Lee Harrison III (BFA 1952, BS 1959): engineer; Emmy winner for invention of computer animation
- Albert G. Hill (BS 1930, MS 1934): professor of physics at MIT; head of Lincoln Lab and Draper Lab; director of research at Institute for Defense Analyses
- Julian W. Hill (BS 1924): chemist; co-inventor of nylon
- Georg Jander (BS 1987): plant biologist at the Boyce Thompson Institute and Cornell University
- Marc Kamionkowski (BA 1987): astrophysicist, particle theorist, and cosmologist
- William Kincaid (BS 1988): costume manufacturer and artist
- Robert C. Kolodny (MD 1969): author of books on human sexuality
- Edwin G. Krebs (MD 1943): winner of Nobel laureate in medicine for work with protein phosphorylation as a biological regulatory mechanism
- Appu Kuttan: founder of the National Education Foundation
- Alexander Langsdorf Jr. (BS 1932): Manhattan Project physicist; vocal critic of nuclear proliferation
- J. C. R. Licklider (BS 1937): pioneer in computer science and artificial intelligence
- Stan London (MD 1949): St. Louis Cardinals and St. Louis Hawks team physician
- Walter E. Massey (AM 1966, PhD 1966): physicist, director of the National Science Foundation, president of Morehouse College
- William E. Moerner (BS 1975): Stanford University professor; winner of 2014 Nobel Prize in Chemistry; pioneer in single molecule spectroscopy and member of the National Academy of Sciences
- Robert H. Mohlenbrock (PhD 1957): botanist and author
- Ben Moreell (BS 1913): U.S. Navy admiral; founder of the Navy's Seabees construction battalions
- Benjamin Movsas (MD 1990): chairman of radiation oncology at the Henry Ford Hospital
- Daniel Nathans (MD 1954): Nobel laureate in medicine for the discovery of restriction enzymes; awarded National Medal of Science
- Alton Ochsner (MD): surgeon and medical researcher at Ochsner Medical Center in New Orleans
- Fred Olsen (PhD): inventor of the ball propellant manufacturing process
- Michael E. Phelps (PhD 1970): developed PET scan
- Rob Phillips (PhD 1989): noted biophysicist; professor at Caltech
- Caroline Thomas Rumbold (1877–1949): botanist
- Pejman Salimpour: physician who successfully challenged the legality of exclusivity agreements between hospitals and doctors' groups
- Michael Salzhauer, "Dr. Miami" (MD 1996): celebrity plastic surgeon
- Peter Shawhan (BS 1990): LIGO physicist; co-recipient of Special Breakthrough Prize in Fundamental Physics
- Joseph Edward Smadel (MD): inaugural recipient of the Albert Lasker Award for Clinical Medical Research
- Sol Spiegelman (PhD 1944): molecular biologist
- Carl Steefel (BA 1974): geoscientist
- Earl Sutherland (MD 1942): Nobel laureate in medicine for elucidating the mechanisms of the actions of hormones
- T. Bill Sutherland (BA 1963): theoretical and mathematical physicist
- Leana Wen (MD): former president of Planned Parenthood, former Baltimore City health commissioner
- Michael J. Wendl (1958): engineering in terrain following technology and energy management theory
- Walter Wyman (MD 1873): 3rd US Surgeon General
- Ernst K. Zinner (PhD 1973): astrophysicist

== Sports ==
- Bill Beckmann (born 1907): former professional baseball pitcher for St. Louis Cardinals and Philadelphia Athletics
- Amelia Boone (BA 2009): obstacle racer
- Joe Bukant (born 1915): professional football player; joined United States Navy
- Jimmy Conzelman (BS 1917): professional football player and coach; enshrined in Pro Football Hall of Fame
- Dwight F. Davis (LLB): founder of the Davis Cup international tennis competition
- AnnMaria De Mars: 1984 Judo World Champion, mother of Ronda Rousey
- Bing Devine (born 1916): general manager of the St. Louis Cardinals 1957–1964
- Bill DeWitt (born 1902): former general manager and owner of the St. Louis Browns and Cincinnati Reds, chairman of the board of the Chicago White Sox, and president of the Detroit Tigers
- Caleb Durbin (born 2000): current professional baseball infielder for Boston Red Sox
- Scott Garson (born 1976): college basketball coach at Santa Clara University; formerly assistant coach at UCLA, Utah and head coach at College of Idaho
- Warren Gill (born 1878): professional baseball player who played first base for the Pittsburgh Pirates
- Kendall Gretsch (BS 2014): three-time Paralympic gold medalist in women's 6km sitting biathlon event, women's 12km sitting event, and paratriathlon event
- Robert Hernreich (AB 1967): co-owner of Sacramento Kings, Swansea City A.F.C.
- Sai Sam Htun (MBA 2008): founder of Loi Hein Company, owner of Yadanarbon FC
- Harvey Jablonsky: football player; U.S. Army veteran; enshrined in College Football Hall of Fame
- Bill Jennings: shortstop in Major League Baseball
- Shelby Jordan (BA 1974): professional football player; enshrined in College Football Hall of Fame
- Bruce Levenson (AB 1971): owner of Atlanta Hawks
- Bob Light: College basketball and tennis coach
- Ryan Loutos (BA 2021): pitcher in the St. Louis Cardinals organization
- Kurt Krieger: first person born in Austria to play Major League Baseball
- Dal Maxvill (BS): professional baseball player, former St. Louis Cardinals general manager
- Muddy Ruel (JD): professional baseball catcher; member of 1924 World Champion Washington Senators
- Julie Uhrman (BSBA 1996): president and co-founder of Angel City FC
- George Herbert Walker (LLB 1897): founder of Walker Cup in golf; grandfather and great-grandfather of Presidents George H. W. Bush and George W. Bush, respectively
- Charley Winner: longtime coach in the National Football League
- Pete Wismann (born 1923): former center/linebacker for the San Francisco 49ers
- Lewis Wolff (MBA 1961): owner of the Oakland Athletics
