= Chris Mortensen =

American journalist (1951–2024)

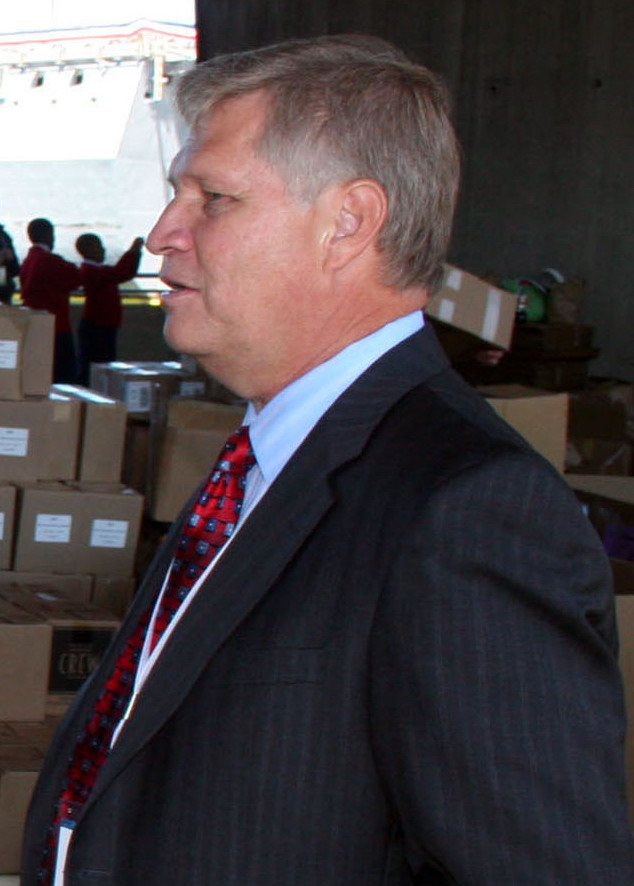
- Mortensen in 2006
- Born: Christian Anthony Mortensen; November 7, 1951; Torrance, California, U.S.
- Died: March 3, 2024 (aged 72); Irondale, Alabama, U.S.
- Occupations: Sports reporter and columnist
- Years active: 1991–2023
- Spouse: Micki Mortensen
- Children: Alex Mortensen

Christian Anthony Mortensen (November 7, 1951 – March 3, 2024), known to friends as "Mort", was an American journalist regarded as a pioneer working year-round reporting news of the National Football League (NFL).

Mortensen was best known for his work at the cable television network ESPN, frequently contributing to the network's award-winning football shows such as NFL GameDay, Sunday NFL Countdown, and Monday Night Countdown, as well as the network's Outside the Lines series. He was also a frequent contributor to the network's SportsCenter, ESPN Radio, and ESPN.com packages.

== Early life ==
Chris Mortensen was born November 7, 1951, in Torrance, California, Mortensen attended North Torrance High School in Torrance, California, and El Camino College before serving two years in the U.S. Army during the Vietnam War.

== Career ==
Mortensen started his career with the South Bay Daily Breeze in 1969. He received 18 awards in journalism. In 1978, he won the National Headliner Award for Investigative Reporting. In 2016, he received the Dick McCann Award from the Pro Football Writers of America and was honored by the Pro Football Hall of Fame during its enshrinement ceremony in August 2016. Beginning in 1985, he covered every Super Bowl except for Super Bowl 50, which he did not cover after being diagnosed with stage IV throat cancer.

=== Atlanta Journal-Constitution ===
From 1983 to 1990, Mortensen worked at the Atlanta Journal-Constitution, filing investigative reports and covering the Atlanta Braves (1983–85), Atlanta Falcons (1985–86) and the National Football League (NFL) (1987–89). In 1987, he was given the George Polk Award for his reporting.

=== The National ===
He once covered the NFL for The National (1989–90), where he was one of the first writers hired by editor Frank Deford.

=== ESPN ===
Mortensen first appeared on ESPN in 1991. He was the first "insider" hired by ESPN. He soon gained recognition as a pioneer of "insider" reporting of the National Football League on national television, breaking some of the biggest news, such as Peyton Manning's retirement.

During his career, Mortensen reported for the network's Emmy Award–winning programs NFL GameDay, NFL Countdown, and the network's shows Outside the Lines and SportsCenter. He worked as an analyst for ESPN's coverage of the NFL draft and changed how ESPN covered the draft.

Mortensen left the network in April 2023 following the 2023 NFL draft due to health problems related to throat cancer.

==== Deflategate controversy ====
On January 21, 2015, Mortensen reported erroneously that 11 of the 12 footballs used in the AFC Championship Game on January 18, 2015, between the New England Patriots and the Indianapolis Colts were 2 pounds per square inch (PSI; 13.8 kPa) under NFL regulation.

The Wells Report findings showed that only 1 of 22 readings (with each ball tested twice with different gauges except the intercepted ball) showed to be under by 2 PSI. The rest ranged from 1.8 to 0.2 PSI (12.4 to 1.4 kPa) below. Despite being debunked in the Wells report, Mortensen's original story remained posted on ESPN as late as August 13, 2015, with no retraction, clarification or apology.

Mortensen was to appear on WEEI's Dennis and Callahan radio show on July 31, 2015, but cancelled. According to WEEI, Mortensen stated he "will not allow WEEI, [Patriots owner Robert] Kraft or anybody to make me the centerpiece of a story that has been misreported far beyond anything I did in the first 48 hours."

=== Other work ===
Mortensen was the author of the 1991 book Playing for Keeps: How One Man Kept the Mob from Sinking Its Hooks into Pro Football - a book which recounts how an FBI agent spent 20 months uncovering and thwarting a scheme involving money-laundering, gambling and attempted game-fixing by the mob in professional football. In 1999, he made a film called The Unreal Story of Professional Wrestling.

== Personal life and death ==
Mortensen was married to Micki Mortensen. Their son, Alex Mortensen, is a coach and former professional quarterback. Chris Mortensen was a Christian, and lived in Bella Vista, Arkansas.

On January 15, 2016, Mortensen announced via an ESPN statement that he had been diagnosed with stage IV throat cancer and would consequently be taking a leave of absence from his on-air work at the cable network. Mortensen survived eight years past the diagnosis, and died at his son's home in Irondale, Alabama, on March 3, 2024, at the age of 72.
