= The National Sports Daily =

Defunct American newspaper

- Ludus aequus omnibus iocus ludique Fair play for all, fun and games
- Masthead of The National
- Type: Daily sports newspaper
- Format: Tabloid
- Owner: Emilio Azcárraga Milmo
- Founder: Emilio Azcárraga Milmo
- Publisher: Peter O. Price
- Editor-in-chief: Frank Deford
- Associate editor: Vince Doria
- Managing editor: Van McKenzie
- Founded: January 31, 1990
- Ceased publication: June 13, 1991
- Language: English
- Headquarters: New York City
- ISSN: 1052-1232

The National Sports Daily, often referred to simply as The National, was a sports-centered newspaper published in the United States beginning on January 31, 1990. The newspaper was based in New York City, was printed in a tabloid format, and was published Monday through Friday. It ceased publication in June 1991.

The National was an American attempt to emulate the model of several international all-sports publications, such as La Gazzetta dello Sport (Italy), L'Equipe (France), and others. The paper was founded by Mexican-American media mogul Emilio Azcárraga Milmo, who had owned Mexican television conglomerate Televisa and whose family had founded Univision. Azcárraga was also the chief financier for the paper and used the success of the international sports papers as his inspiration for founding The National.

== Overview ==
When The National was launched, it featured National Basketball Association superstars Michael Jordan, Magic Johnson, and Patrick Ewing on the first cover to represent the Chicago, Los Angeles, and New York media markets (where the paper was initially available). The cover price was 50 cents.

For his editor in chief, Azcárraga turned to veteran sportswriter Frank Deford. At the time of the forming of the paper, Deford was a writer for Sports Illustrated and an NPR contributor. He also had very little newspaper experience, especially where editing was concerned. Future ESPN executive Vince Doria was brought in to be executive editor.

Deford immediately set out to get what was referred to by Bill Simmons as a "murderer's row" of sportswriters to join The National. Deford said that hiring Atlanta Journal-Constitution sports editor Van McKenzie away from the paper was the "best thing he did" and was the linchpin for getting many of the writers who eventually signed up to write for The National interested. Once McKenzie was hired, he brought his auto racing writer Ed Hinton and investigative reporter and NFL analyst Chris Mortensen with him. Norman Chad, who was writing for The Washington Post at the time, was hired, as was New York Daily News writer Mike Lupica, Rocky Mountain News writer Jay Mariotti, Wrestling Observer Newsletter writer Dave Meltzer, The Dallas Morning News writer Ivan Maisel, The Boston Globe writer Leigh Montville, and various others. Tony Kornheiser considered taking a job with the National but decided to stay at The Washington Post.

=== Problems ===
The National used The Wall Street Journal's printing and distribution network to publish separate editions in each time zone. However, this did not help matters. Problems arose almost from day one, as The National was not as widely circulated as expected. For the first few months, where the paper was being rolled out on a market-to-market basis, there was an expected circulation of 250,000 copies a day, eventually hoping to rise to 1,000,000 copies by 2001. The National also did not generate much in the way of advertising revenue as the publishers were unable to secure companies that were able (or willing) to purchase ad space. Furthermore, readers of The National could only receive the paper by purchasing it at retail outlets like newsstands and bookstores or in street boxes; the paper attempted to offer a home delivery subscription service but could not work out the logistics, and editor-in-chief Frank Deford noted that he had to cancel his own potential subscription account when everyone else on his street did.

Timing also proved a concern. The Wall Street Journal facilities would often have deliveries leave the distributors at such an early time that The National was often unable to meet deadlines for game results. Another problem this created was inconsistency, as some cities that sold The National in street boxes often saw these boxes left empty. To top it off, major market papers refused to allow The National to run advertising in their publications and some sportswriters at competing local papers resorted to attacking the street boxes with baseball bats.

== The end ==
As the year went on, the financial state of The National worsened, to the point where the paper had tens of millions of dollars cut from its budget as 1991 began. The cover price was increased by a quarter as well, which caused the already low circulation to decline further as readers were even less willing to spend 75 cents to receive national sports news that they could find in their local publications, or the nationally distributed USA Today by comparison, for 50 cents or even less.

Despite a last-ditch effort to start an online distribution through Compuserve, the declining circulation was enough for The National to announce it was ceasing publication. On June 13, 1991, The National put out its final issue with its front cover reading "We Had A Ball: The fat lady sings our song."
