= Courtney Adams =

American painter

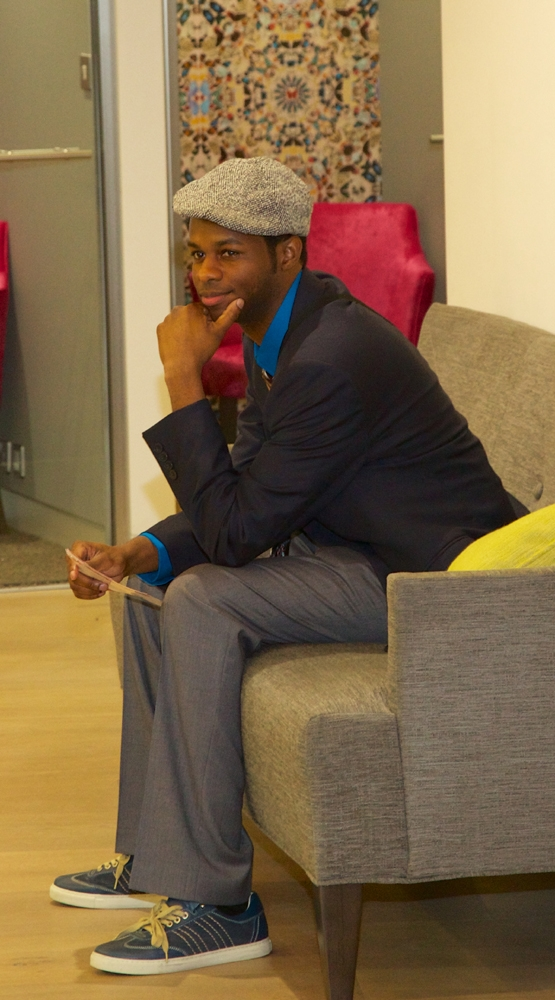
- Courtney Adams at the Dryland (club) in Kensington, London - November 30, 2012
- Born: June 5, 1981; Houston, Texas
- Education: Atlanta College of Art
- Known for: Painting
- Movement: Expressionism, Cubism, Primitivism

Courtney Adams (born June 5, 1981 in Houston, Texas) is an artist based in Hamburg, Germany. His style is flat, but a multi-dimensional style of painting called “Cubo-Expressionistic Primitivism” ( a mixture of French Cubism, German Expressionism and African Primitivism), in which he filed a copyright with the Library of Congress in the United States of America in 2002. His works are usually done in acrylic paint to produce a “factory made” look. After being discovered by famous Polish singer Aneta Barcik at a winter concert in Houston, Texas in 2010 (the year of Frédéric Chopin's bicentenary), Adams was chosen to become the art director for “Chopin 200th” a multi-media festival created by Barcik. The festival toured around Europe, most notably at the Eigenarten Festival in Germany. In 2011, Houston based magazine "River oaks/Tanglewood Buzz" did a short segment about Adams winter exhibition in Germany and London, as well as his first masterclass taught in London at the Loft at Crouch End. In June, he was nominated as the first "Polen Freund" (translated in English as the First Friend of Poland) in the 1st Polish Festival in Hamburg, Germany which took place at Museum für Völkerkunde. This honored allowed him as the first non-Polish artist to exhibit his work at the Festival at the museum. Courtney was featured in a news segment called "Kultur Tip" on the Hamburg Journal TV program in June, 2011. In April 2012, Adams also became the first and only American Artist inducted into The Magma Group, an artist exhibition group based in South East London, curated by artist Annie Zamero. In November 2012, Courtney Adams signed a two-year art distribution deal with Uk-based company LatestSale and has since left the Magma Group. In 2023-2024, Adams was elected as a member of Contemporary Art Museum Houston's Teacher Advisory Group.

== Music career ==
Adams is also a musician and professional songwriter affiliated with SESAC under Courtney Adams Music Publishing. He has scored several jingles for TV infomercials through Florida based company, Sullivan Productions for such products as the Zanshu Knife, Wacky Pens and Green Caps. Adams is currently working on several musical projects in Long Beach, California. Since 2009, Adams has been a member of the Marshall Arts Music Production House song writing team, led by Marshall Goodman "Ras MG", and has participated in song writing for artists including Slightly Stoopid, Rebelution, and LBDA. Adams and Goodman have written a multitude of songs for Adams' solo project named Clavious. The duo plans to extend their body of work by developing Adams' Rock Band concept Element 115 in the near future.

== Discography ==
2015

- Rebelution (band) - Count Me In EP "De-Stress"
- Slightly Stoopid - Meanwhile...Back at the Lab "The Prophet"
