= Atlanta College of Art =

Former art school in Atlanta, Georgia, United States

Coordinates: 33°47′21.97″N 84°23′10.28″W

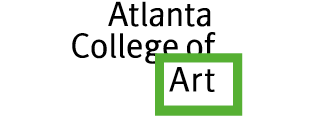
- Active: 1905–2006
- Affiliations: Woodruff Arts Center
- Location: Atlanta, Georgia, United States
- Website: aca.edu

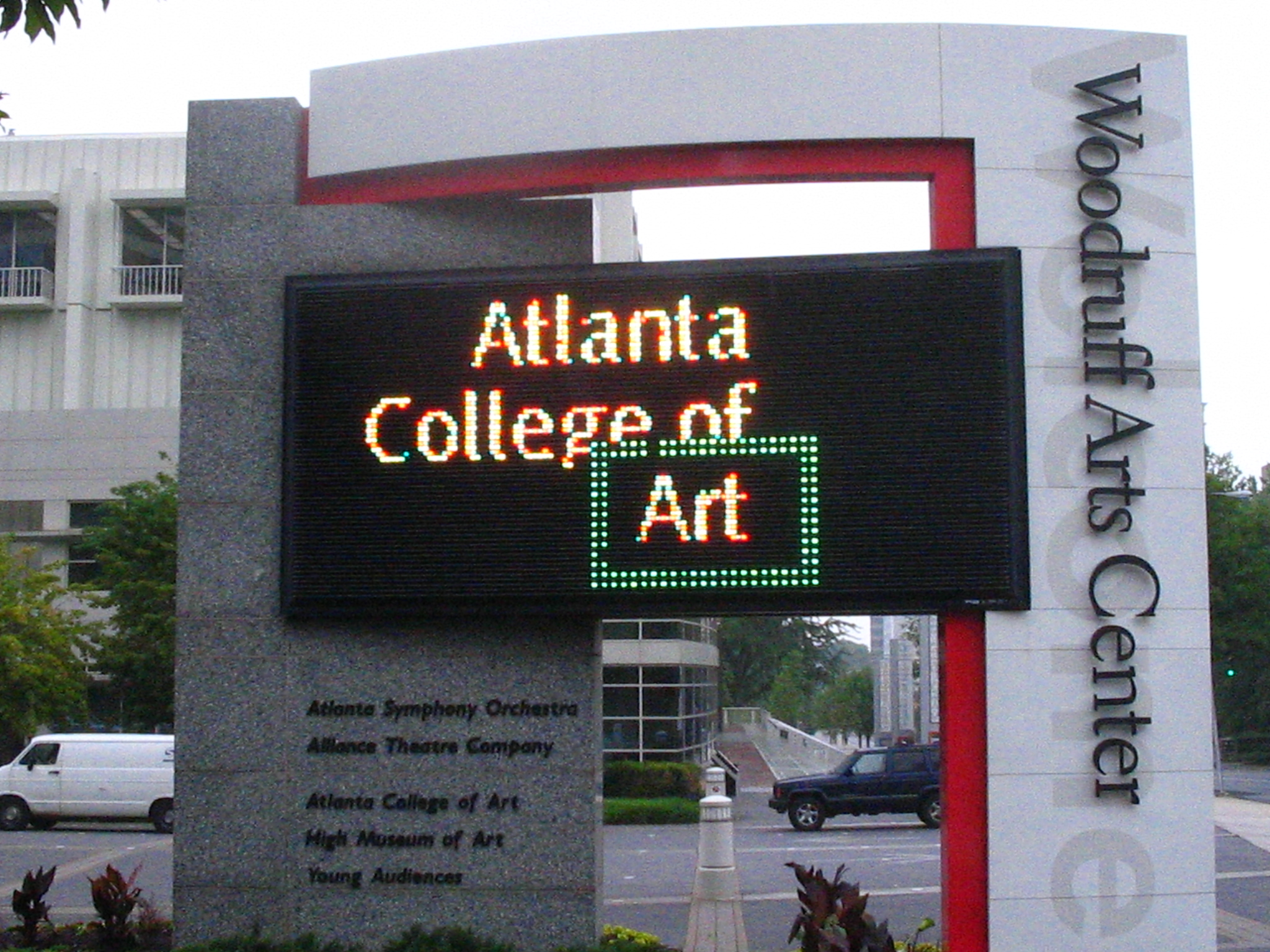
Atlanta College of Art Sign at the Woodruff Arts Center

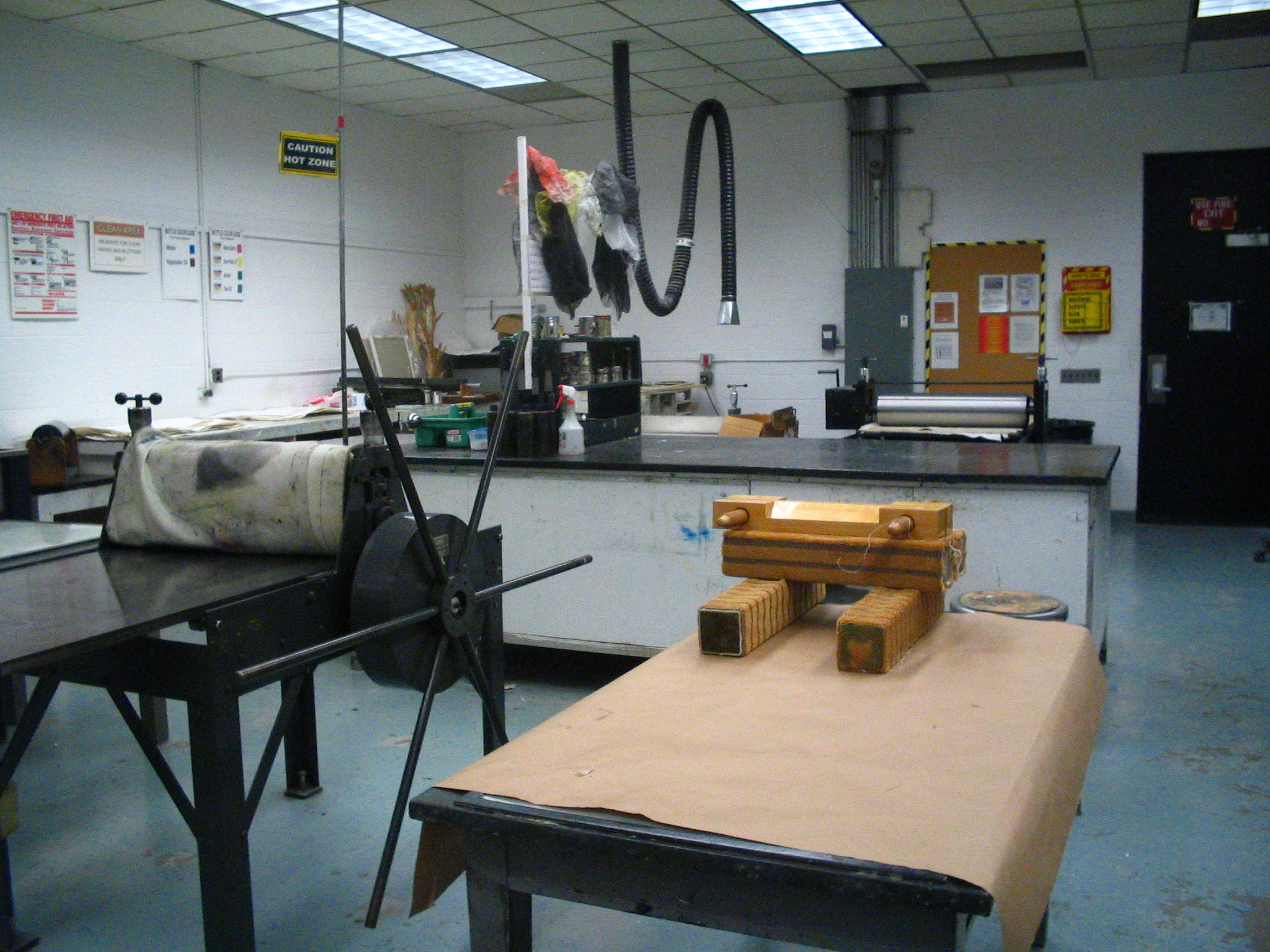
Atlanta College of Art Printmaking Studio Spring of 2006.

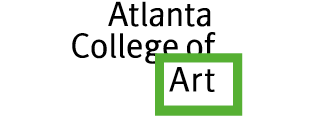
Logo of the Atlanta College of Art

The Atlanta College of Art (ACA) was a private four-year art college located in Atlanta, Georgia. Founded in 1905, it was the oldest art college in the Southeast when it was sold out by the Woodruff Arts Center board of directors to the Savannah College of Art and Design in 2006.

== History ==
In 1905, the Atlanta Art Association helped establish an art college and museum that would later become the Atlanta College of Art and the High Museum of Art, respectively. In 1963, the college was incorporated into the Atlanta Memorial Arts Center, later called the Woodruff Arts Center on Peachtree Street in Midtown Atlanta, named for its primary benefactor, Robert W. Woodruff. The center opened in 1968, comprising ACA, the High Museum of Art, the Atlanta Symphony Orchestra and the Alliance Theatre.

In August 2005, the boards of trustees of the Woodruff Arts Center and the Savannah College of Art and Design (SCAD) formally approved the merger of ACA and SCAD. In June 2006, the two institutions combined operations at SCAD's Atlanta location. The merger was widely contested by many ACA students, faculty and members of the Atlanta arts community.

== Campus ==
In 2002, the High Museum of Art announced an expansion plan for the museum that included a new dormitory for the college. Italian architect Renzo Piano was hired for the project. SCAD acquired this dormitory in its merger with ACA and named it "ACA Residence Hall" in honor of the college.

== Courses and programs ==
The college offered studies in the mediums of drawing, painting, printmaking, photography, sculpture, digital art, sound, video, interior design, and graphic design. The school also offered degrees in business and programs through the Georgia Artists Registry, ACA Gallery shows, community education classes for adults, and summer programs in the arts for children and teens.

== Notable alumni ==
Notable alumni of the Atlanta College of Art include Courtney Adams, Radcliffe Bailey, Roe Ethridge, Steven Evans, Maxwell Stevens, and Kara Walker.
