= Vivek Ranadivé =

Indian-American business executive and founder of TIBCO (born 1957)

Vivek Yeshwant Ranadivé
- Born: Vivek Yeshwant Ranadivé; 7 October 1957 (age 69); Mumbai, Maharashtra, India
- Education: Massachusetts Institute of Technology (SB, SM); Harvard University (MBA)
- Occupations: Founder of TIBCO Software; Owner and chairman of the Sacramento Kings; Owner of the Sacramento River Cats
- Spouse: Deborah Addicott (m. 1979–1999)
- Children: 3

Vivek Yeshwant Ranadivé (/viːˈvɛk ˌrʌnəˈdɪveɪ/ vee-VEK RUN-ə-DIV-ay; born 7 October 1957) is an Indian-American business executive, engineer, author, speaker and philanthropist Ranadivé is the founder and former chief executive officer (CEO) of TIBCO Software, a business intelligence software company, and of Teknekron Software Systems. Ranadivé is also a co-owner and chairman of the National Basketball Association's Sacramento Kings. In 2022, Ranadivé purchased a Minor League Baseball franchise, the Sacramento River Cats.

== Early life and career ==
Ranadivé grew up in the Juhu area of Mumbai, India, and was the youngest of three children. He studied at the Bombay International School, located at Babulnath, Mumbai. He is the great-nephew of the Indian Communist leaders Balkrishna Trimbak Ranadive and Ahilya Rangnekar. At 16, Ranadivé was admitted by MIT, but in the 1970s the Indian government did not financially support Indians who wanted to study abroad. Ranadivé talked his way into the office of the Reserve Bank of India and got the required currency to cover one quarter of the tuition.

After earning bachelor's and master's degrees in electrical engineering from MIT, he obtained an MBA from Harvard Business School in 1983. While at MIT, Ranadivé started his first company, a UNIX consulting company. He also held management and engineering positions with Ford Motor Company, M/A-Com Linkabit and Fortune Systems.

=== Teknekron Software Systems ===
Teknekron Corp., a technology incubator, provided $250,000 in seed capital to Ranadivé in 1985 to found Teknekron Software Systems.

=== TIBCO ===
In 1997, Ranadivé founded TIBCO Software Inc. with funding from Cisco and Reuters.

=== Bow Capital ===
In 2016, Ranadivé founded Bow Capital, an early-stage startup investment firm in partnership with the University of California Regents. Among their investments are Skillit (platform), Eversight, Workramp, Jerry.ai, and Flex.

== NBA ==
=== Golden State Warriors ===
In 2010, Ranadivé became the co-owner and vice chairman of the Golden State Warriors, making him the first person of Indian descent to co-own an NBA franchise.

=== Sacramento Kings ===
On 21 March 2013, it was announced that Ranadivé had joined Ronald Burkle and Mark Mastrov to attempt to purchase the Sacramento Kings. In order for Ranadivé to purchase the Kings, he had to sell his share of the Golden State Warriors. On 16 May 2013, it was announced that the group reached an agreement with the Maloof family to purchase 65% of the Kings for approximately $348 million. The NBA approved the sale on 28 May. Ranadivé made waves in 2014 when he proposed a style of play that included his team keeping one player on offense the entire time, creating a 4-on-5 defense on the other end.

== Works ==
Published works
Work	Year	Author(s)
The Power of Now: How Winning Companies Sense and Respond to Change Using Real-Time Technology	1999	Vivek Ranadivé
The Power to Predict	2006	Vivek Ranadivé
The Two-Second Advantage: How We Succeed by Anticipating the Future–Just Enough	2011	Vivek Ranadivé

== Personal life ==
Ranadivé and his former wife, Deborah Addicott, have three children: Aneel, Andre, and Anjali. Anjali is an R&B singer-songwriter, former basketball executive, and philanthropist. His son Aneel founded Soma Capital, a venture fund that has seeded 34 unicorns by 2025.

From 2016 to 2020, Ranadivé donated $55,731 to Democratic candidates and causes.

Sporting positions
Preceded by Maloof family Robert Hernreich	Sacramento Kings principal owner 2013–present	Incumbent
