= Friends Select School =

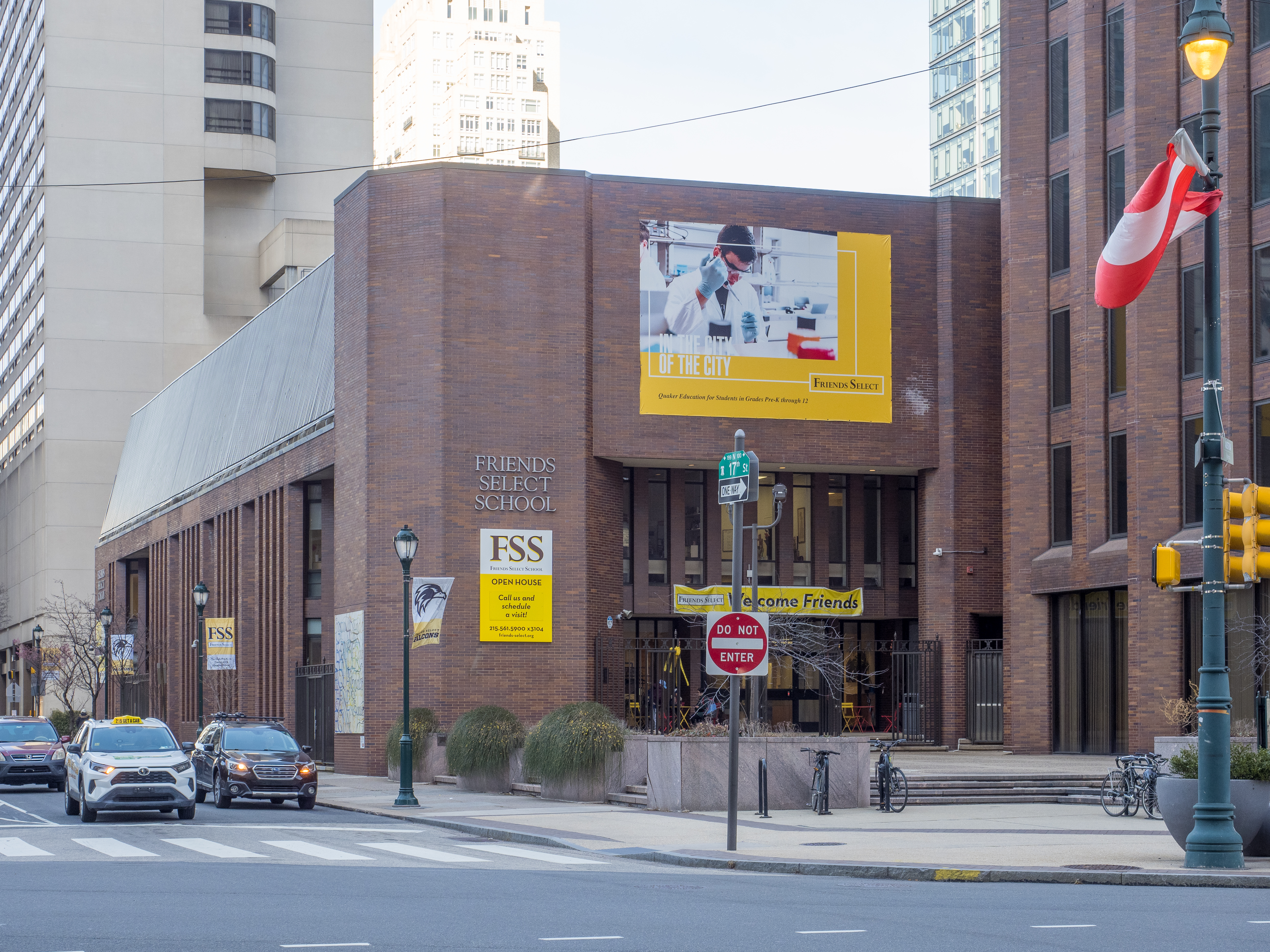

Location
- 1651 Benjamin Franklin Parkway, Philadelphia, Pennsylvania, U.S. Philadelphia, Pennsylvania; United States; 39.9564°N 75.1671°W

Information
- Type: Private School
- Motto: Integrum Vitae "The Whole of Life"
- Religious affiliation: Religious Society of Friends (Quakers)
- Established: 1833; 193 years ago
- Head of school: Michael Gary
- Faculty: 90
- Grades: PreK-12
- Enrollment: 588
- Student to teacher ratio: 8:1
- Campus type: Urban
- Colors: Brown and Gold
- Athletics conference: Friends School League
- Mascot: Falcon
- Affiliation: National Association of Independent Schools
- Website: friends-select.org

Friends Select School (FSS) is an all-gender Quaker school serving students from pre-kindergarten through grade 12. It is located at 17th Street and the Benjamin Franklin Parkway in Center City Philadelphia, Pennsylvania. The institution traces its origins to the first Friends school established in Philadelphia in 1689; the current school was formally founded in 1833 and has occupied its present site since 1885.

The school's education philosophy reflects longstanding Quaker principles, including respect for all individuals, simplicity, nonviolent conflict resolution, and the pursuit of truth.

Friends Select's main Parkway Building was constructed between 1967 and 1969 and has undergone several renovations. In 2022, the school added a separate Upper School STEAM Building at 1520 Race Street. The nearby Race Street Meetinghouse, built in 1856, is used for weekly Meeting for Worship by students and faculty.

Friends Select maintains a care relationship with the Central Philadelphia Friends Meeting and the Monthly Meeting of Friends of Philadelphia, which meets at the Arch Street Meeting House. Governance is overseen by a board of trustees composed of equal representation from both meetings.

== History ==
Friends Select School traces its origins to 1689, when the Monthly Meeting of Friends of Philadelphia established its first school.

=== 19th century ===
Friends Select has existed in its current form since 1833 and has been at its present location since 1885. In 1832, a committee was appointed to set up two select schools.

In January 1833, a Select School for Boys opened in the meetinghouse on Orange Street (located from 7th to 8th Streets, between Locust and Spruce streets.) and a Select School for Girls opened in the meeting house on 12th Street at 20 South 12th St.

In 1885, a new school building on 16th Street above Arch Street was nearing completion with a capacity for 60 scholars of each sex in the upper schools, and of 20 in each of the primaries. In 1886, both the boys' and girls' select school relocated to the new building at 16th and Cherry Streets. The location corresponds to the present-day intersection of 17th Street and the Benjamin Franklin Parkway.

The school was built land that had originally served as a Quaker burial ground encompassing the entire block. Remains were reinterred elsewhere to accommodate the construction of the school buildings and the later development of the Benjamin Franklin Parkway. An additional building was constructed in 1892, and a covered passageway joined the two buildings in 1894. Overtime, further additions extended the complex along Cherry Street to nearly the full length of the block.

=== 20th century ===
Construction of the Benjamin Franklin Parkway was completed in 1916. A modern gymnasium was added in the late 1950s. In 1965, the school committee became serious about developing 17th and the Parkway for joint use.

The decision was made to tear down the old Friends Select School and to build a new school building and office building on the same site. Once school closed in June 1967, preparations were made to move temporarily to the Central YMCA located at 1421 Arch Street.

For approximately a year and a half, the school relocated and classes were held at the Central Branch of the YMCA, about two blocks away, first on the third floor for the 1967–68 school year, then on the fourth floor for the fall of the 1968–69 school year. Construction proceeded far enough for classes to move into the uncompleted new school building when Christmas break ended the following New Year's Day, 1969. The class of 1967 was the last class to graduate from the old school building, the class of 1968 graduated from the YMCA location, and the class of 1969 was the first class to graduate from the current school building.

The current Parkway Building was begun in 1967 and completed in 1969. An adjacent campus building was located across the street at 1700 Race Street. The school owns the entire city block on which the Parkway Building is located. The Three Parkway Building was originally leased to the Pennsalt Chemicals Corporation, later renamed Pennwalt, in a 99-year ground lease to help finance construction of the current school building. The Three Parkway Building now includes spaces on the second and third floors that are part of the Friends Select's Parkway Campus Expansion Project, which was completed in January 2026.

=== 21st century ===
Advance Friends Select: Transformation Campaign

Friends Select School undertook a multi-year campus improvement initiative known as the Advance Friends Select: Transformation Campaign. The campaign included renovations and upgrades to facilities on the school's Parkway campus in Center City Philadelphia.

Renovations to the Parkway Building included updates to the lobby, Lower School classrooms, the Gilroy Roberts Art Studio, the rooftop athletic field, the gymnasium, and the Blauvelt Theatre. As part of the campaign, an Upper School STEAM Building was completed in 2022 at 1520 Race Street.

Parkway Campus Expansion Project

The Parkway Campus Expansion Project was completed in January 2026 and expanded Friends Select's campus into the neighboring Three Parkway Building. The project added approximately 32,000 square feet of space on the building's second and third floors. The expansion includes Upper School classrooms, gathering spaces, work areas, and conference rooms.

== Education ==
=== Lower school ===
Friends Select School's Lower School serves students from pre-kindergarten through fourth grade. The program emphasizes foundational academic skills and reflects the school's Quaker affiliation. Instruction is informed by experiential and inquiry-based learning approaches. Students participate in core academic subjects as well as instruction from specialist teachers in areas such as science, art, music, world languages, physical education, and STEAM. The curriculum incorporates thematic studies, collaborative projects, and age-appropriate service learning. Students also participate in Meetings for Worship, a practice rooted in Quaker tradition. Learning is supported through field trips and partnerships with cultural and educational institutions in Philadelphia, which are integrated into grade-level curriculum themes.

=== Middle school ===
Friends Select School's Middle School serves students in fifth through eighth grades. The curriculum includes core academic subjects such as English, mathematics, social studies, and science, alongside instruction in art, music, physical education, and world languages. Middle School world language offerings include Spanish, Mandarin, and Latin. Students also participate in performance electives such as drama, orchestra, chorus, or percussion. In addition to core coursework, grade-specific classes are offered, including conflict resolution in fifth grade; identity and society, and digital literacy in sixth grade; and STEAM (science, technology, engineering, arts, and mathematics) courses in seventh and eighth grades.

Middle School students may take part in student committees and clubs. Committees are student-led groups focused on school life and community activities. Students also join at least one club during the school day, with offerings that have included models and figures, rock band, cubing, yarn arts, and walking. Participation in at least one seasonal sport is encouraged.

=== Upper school ===
Friends Select School's Upper School serves students in ninth through twelfth grades and offers a college-preparatory curriculum informed by the school's Quaker affiliation. The program combines required core coursework with elective and experiential learning opportunities. Academic departments include English, history, science, mathematics, world languages, the arts, experiential learning, physical education, and health. Students complete required courses and select from a range of electives, including advanced and interdisciplinary offerings, as well as independent study options.

Upper School students may participate in extracurricular activities such as clubs, athletics, service projects, internships, and student publications, including the school newspaper, The Falcon. The school also hosts an annual, student-led Social Justice Week that includes guest speakers, discussions, and experiential learning activities. Friends Select offers opportunities for cultural exchange and language immersion through partnerships with institutions in the United States and abroad. Exchange and study programs have included partnerships in Germany, Costa Rica, Ireland, Mexico, and Italy.

Faculty advisers counsel students on academic and social issues. A grade dean, a faculty member who monitors student progress and oversees the grade's advisory structure, remains with the class through graduation. Advisories, groups of eight to 10 students, also stay together through twelfth grade.

=== Diversity, Equity, Inclusion, and Belonging ===
Friends Select School has implemented programs to promote diversity, equity, inclusion, and belonging (DEIB) across its Lower, Middle, and Upper School divisions. The school organizes affinity groups for students, as well as peer mentorship programs such as the Big Sibs/Little Sibs Program for students of color. Lower School students participate in an annual DEI Book Awards program, which is open to the school community and the public. Both Lower and Middle Schools hold a Social Justice Day each year, while the Upper School hosts a Day of Inclusivity, Community, and Equity in addition to a student-led Social Justice Week.

The school's Family Association organizes events such as a Dr. Martin Luther King Jr. Day Family Experience and provides opportunities for families to engage in DEIB programming. Faculty and staff have access to professional development focused on diversity and equity.

Beginning in the 2026–27 school year, Friends Select will offer full scholarships to two new students annually through a grant from The Children's Education Initiative. Scholarship recipients will receive support from The Children's Education Initiative to cover tuition and associated costs for kindergarten through eighth grade, with Friends Select covering tuition and associated costs for grades nine through twelve. The program is intended to increase access for students who are socioeconomically disadvantaged at independent schools.

=== City as a Classroom ===
Friends Select School incorporates its location in Center City Philadelphia into its curriculum through partnerships with local institutions. Students have access to universities, museums, cultural organizations, social service agencies, and government offices. The school's programs connect classroom learning to experiences in the surrounding community. Some partnerships are long-standing, such as a ninth-grade research project at the Philadelphia Art Museum and middle school service-learning with Historic Fair Hill. Other experiences involve short-term or project-specific collaborations with local organizations. The school uses its urban location to provide students with experiential learning opportunities through walking trips, public transportation, or school-provided transportation, integrating Philadelphia's resources into its curriculum.

=== Wellness Program ===
Friends Select School's Wellness Program, established in 2015, provides support and education on mental health and well-being to students, faculty, and families. The program is led by the school counseling team and includes presentations, workshops, and participatory activities.

Topics addressed by the program include mental health, learning styles, peer relationships, social media and internet use, academic pressures, and the college application process. The program also engages the broader school community in discussions of current events and wellness strategies.

== Athletics ==
The athletic program, open to students in grades five through twelve, helps students build a sense of self-esteem and of community through teamwork and individual accomplishment. Students learn skills and strategies of the games and participation in the athletic program encourages good sportsmanship, responsibility, and time management skills.

=== Facilities ===
Friends Select's athletic facilities include:

- 25-yard swimming pool
- Full gymnasium
- Wrestling gymnasium
- Weight room
- Girls' locker room
- Boys' locker room
- Roof-top athletic fields (includes 8 tennis courts, field hockey field)
- Fitness center
- Dance studio
- Soccer, softball and baseball fields in Fairmount Park
- Vesper Boat House

=== Friends Schools’ League Participating Schools ===
Abington Friends School, The Academy of the New Church, Friends' Central School, George School, Germantown Friends School, Jack M. Barrack Hebrew Academy, The Shipley School, and Westtown School are the other eight members of the conference.

Fall athletic offerings

- Field hockey
- Soccer
- Cross country
- Girls' tennis

Winter athletic offerings

- Basketball
- Swimming
- Squash*

Spring athletic offerings

- Baseball
- Softball
- Boys' tennis
- Crew rowing*

Golf (upper school only)

* These sports are only options to upper and middle school students

== Student life ==
=== The Arts ===
The art curriculum, often interdisciplinary and multicultural, centers on engaging lessons based on the elements and principles of art and design. A major focus each year is the Lower School Artist Study. Weekly sessions in the art room from pre-kindergarten through second grade are taught in half-class groups.

==== Music ====
Music is a multi-tiered program offering singing, Orff instruments, movement and at least two stage performances per year. These revolve around thematic studies, or might simply be songs, skits, or dances that develop from students’ collective creativity. There are two weekly sessions in the music room for pre-kindergarten through second grade; three weekly sessions are offered to grades three and four.

==== Artist study ====
For a period each year, the lower school studies a special artist, one whose life provides an interesting story and whose artwork has a special appeal to children. Artists chosen recently have included ceramist, naturalist, painter and printer Walter Inglis Anderson, sculptor and teacher Selma Burke, architect Frank Lloyd Wright, illustrator and author Charles Santore, ceramist Josefina Aguilar, filmmaker Hayao Miyazaki, and designer and director Julie Taymor. The objective is to experience the vision of an individual artist, learn ways that art is used in various cultures and come to appreciate the choices that each artist makes in terms of work and life. Each student artist creates his or her own artwork based on the themes and techniques of the artist being studied. The study concludes with an exhibit of every child's work and an interdisciplinary music-drama-art performance.

==== Middle school ====
===== Fine Arts =====
All middle school students take visual arts and music each year. In addition, students can choose to participate in orchestra, ensemble, chorus, or drama. These are performing ensembles. There is also an annual middle school drama production open to any middle school student who wishes to participate.

==== Upper School ====
===== Fine Arts =====
Students complete at least two fine arts courses. Offerings in the performing arts include Choir, Introduction to Directing, Instrumental Ensemble and American Music in the 20th century. Courses in the visual arts include Art Foundations, Drawing and Painting I and II, Photography I and II, Introduction to Filmmaking, Studio Major, Graphic Design and Metalsmithing.

===== Philadelphia Museum of Art Research Project =====
In year two of the Interdisciplinary Sequence, ninth grade students study at the Philadelphia Museum of Art. There, students select a work of art from the Medieval to Renaissance periods as their research focus. The culmination of the course is an evening at the museum, where each student presents a detailed and comprehensive description of a work of art to an audience of parents, friends, faculty and museum-goers.

=== Extra curricular activities ===
Co-curricular involvement is an integral part of each middle schooler's experience. It may include the literary magazine, mainstage theater, student government, peer tutoring, movie night and more. In addition, each student is required to participate in at least one season of after-school interscholastic athletics per year.

Upper school students select co-curricular activities from a variety of options. Opportunities include two mainstage productions each year, instrumental music and choir performances, student government, and such organizations as the Multicultural Student Union, the Jewish Student Union, the Falcon (student newspaper), The Cauldron (arts and literary journal), Worship & Ministry, the Operation Smile Club, Model UN, and the Mock Trial Team. In ninth and tenth grades, all students are required to participate in at least one season of after-school sports or in one theatrical production. Friends Select competes in the Friends School League and with other independent as well as public and parochial schools.

== Notable alumni ==
- Mira Sharpless Townsend (1798–1859), social reformer, activist and founder of the Rosine Association for the support of destitute women
- Barrie Ciliberti, former Maryland State Delegate
- Patricia Degener (1924–2008), artist who specialized in ceramics
- Anna Elizabeth Dickinson, lecturer for the abolition of slavery and for women's rights during the Civil War
- Jennifer Freyd, 1974, psychology professor, author, founder and President of the Center for Institutional Courage
- Andrea Kremer, 1976, sports reporter for NBC Sports and former reporter for ESPN
- Louis Massiah, 1972, documentary filmmaker
- John McWhorter, 1983, linguist at Columbia University, author
- Peter O. Price, media executive and business person
- Walter Ferris Price, architect
- Wendell Pritchett, Chancellor of Rutgers University–Camden, Interim Dean and Presidential Professor at the University of Pennsylvania Law School, and Provost of the University of Pennsylvania
- David Schlessinger, 1972, founder of United States retail stores Zany Brainy and Five Below
- Richard Vaux, United States Congressman, Mayor of Philadelphia
- Aharon Wasserman, 2005, computer technologist
- Maia Weintraub (born 2002), 2021, fencer, Two-time U.S. National Women's Foil Champion (2019, 2023), 2022 NCAA Individual Women's Foil Champion, Olympic Gold Medalist (Paris, 2024, U.S. women's team foil)
