= Patricia Degener =

American ceramist

Patricia “Patsy” Degener (1924–2008) was an American artist who specialized in ceramics. She helped found Craft Alliance, a St. Louis–based gallery and crafts cooperative, in 1964.

== Personal life ==
Patricia Degener was born in Washington, D.C., in 1924. Her father, Captain J.P. Norfleet, was a navy officer. His career led Degener and her family to move to various locations along the east coast throughout her childhood. She eventually graduated from Friends Select School in Philadelphia, Pennsylvania, and continued her education at Wellesley College and Washington University in St. Louis, where she earned her undergraduate degree. She moved to St. Louis in 1954 with her former husband, Glenn Degener, a teacher at St. Louis Country Day School (now MICDS). She and her then-husband had five children, four of whom survived her. In addition to her love of art, Degener was also an athlete and loved to ski. She died on April 19, 2008, of ovarian cancer, a disease that she had struggled with for years before her death.

== Career ==
Degener began her professional career as a teacher at Rowan Woods School. She was on the faculty of the People’s Art Center, an inner-city program to help disadvantaged children in urban areas, founded by the WPA in 1942. Degener also managed MECA, the Metropolitan Educational Center for the Arts. In 1969, she became the interior design writer for the St. Louis Post Dispatch, and in 1980 became the paper’s art critic. She retired from the St. Louis Post Dispatch in 1990.

Degener was always passionate about art and worked in many mediums, including painting, drawing, writing, and ceramics. During the early years of her marriage, it became clear that ceramics was Degener’s preferred medium. She continued to create pottery throughout her life. One of her daughters, quoted in stltoday.com, said that, “when she wrote, she paced, said bad words and chain-smoked cigarettes. She was relaxed when she made pottery.” Degener’s ceramics are remembered as being unique pieces that incorporate mirrors into the clay.
