= Tayeb Bouzid =

Algerian politician

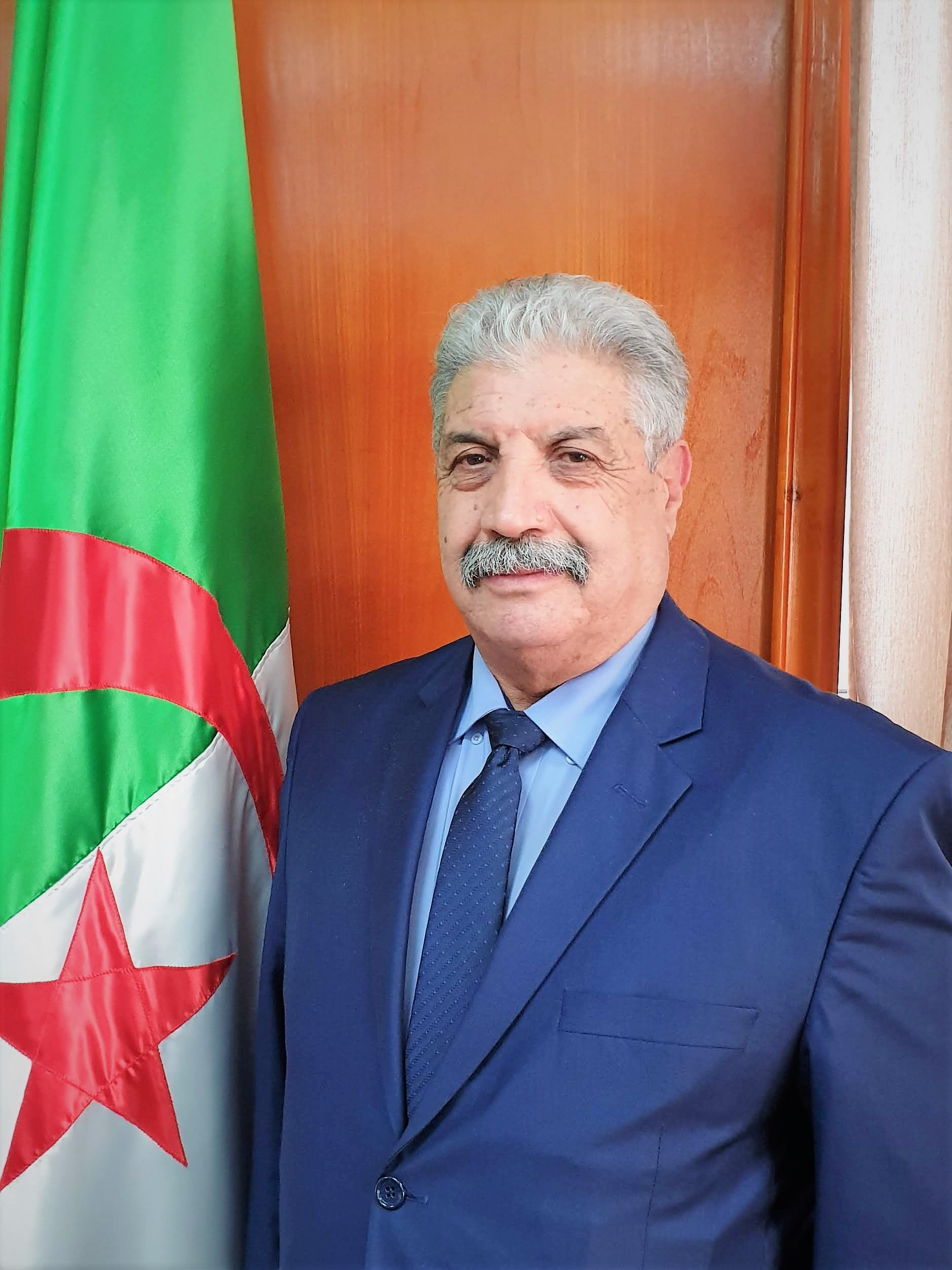
- Tayeb BOUZID Minister of Higher Education and Scientific Research (MHESR) in Algeria
- Born: February 3, 1955 (age 71); Taxelent, Wilaya of Batna
- Occupation: Algerian minister

Tayeb Bouzid (born 3 of February 1955) is an Algerian minister. He took office at the Ministry of Higher Education and Scientific Research (Arabic: وزارة التعليم العالي والبحث العلمي), in Algiers, Algeria on April 1, 2019.

== Background ==
Bouzid was born in Taxelent, Wilaya of Batna. He graduated from Washington University in St. Louis and obtained his PhD at the University of Batna. He is married and is a father of three children.

== Career ==
Bouzid took office at the Ministry of Higher Education and Scientific Research of Algeria on April 1, 2019. He worked as a rector of the University of Batna 2 - Mostefa Ben Boulaid (2015-2019) and vice-rector in-charge of the External Relations, Cooperation and Communication (2012-2015). He was a member of the National Pedagogical Commission, as well as vice-rector in charge of the Pedagogy (2000-2006). He was a member of the National Pedagogical Civil Engineering Council (1992-1994) and the head of Institute of Hydraulics (1992-1994). Deputy Assistant INES Civil Engineering (1986-1990).
