= Maxwell Stevens =

American painter

- Born: Maxwell Stevens; June 29, 1971 (age 55); Charleston, South Carolina
- Education: The Atlanta College of Art; Washington University in St. Louis
- Known for: Painter
- Notable work: Autumn Leaves series Spring Essence series Summer Table Paintings
- Movement: Contemporary Art
- Awards: Forward Arts Foundation

Maxwell Stevens (born June 29, 1971) is an American contemporary visual artist, best known for his multi-layered paintings and drawings that overlay photorealistic images with vivid, energized abstractions. His paintings and drawings address many of the shared aspects of the human condition. He lives and works in New York City.

== Early life and education ==
Maxwell Stevens was born in 1971 in Charleston, South Carolina. He grew up in the Pacific Northwest, and at age 12 his family returned to the southeast, to an island off of central Florida's Atlantic coast. Stevens attended The Atlanta College of Art (now SCAD Atlanta) where he earned his Bachelor of Fine Arts degree in 1993, and the Graduate School of Art at Washington University in St. Louis where he earned a Master of Fine Arts degree in 1995. Shortly thereafter, he set up a large studio on the top floor of the then abandoned 1905 Elder Shirt Factory Warehouse in Downtown St. Louis, which he would occupy for the next six years. It was there that he began developing the painting style for which he is known.

== Career ==
In the 1990s Maxwell was influenced by the tactile minimalist paintings of contemporary masters such as Robert Ryman, the visual repetitions of Agnes Martin and by strategies of neoconceptual artists, especially Sherrie Levine’s “Meltdown” series, in which she distilled representations of iconic modern art works to a severely reductionist color scheme. Contrary to these influences, however, is Maxwell's insistence on the direct experience of vibrant color, variability of handheld brushstroke, surface play, and texture, albeit to an exaggerated degree and without conveying any recognizably associated image.

At 26, Maxwell Stevens’ first solo exhibition with a commercial gallery was held at Solomon Projects in Atlanta, which ran January 24 through March 7, 1998. The exhibition consisted of five black-on-white and white-on-black arcs, executed in a contemplative and highly reductionist manner. These early Minimalist compositions drew comparisons to artists such as Ed Ruscha and Brice Marden, but he was also influenced by the YBAs, or Young British Artists working in London at the time. He also had his first work included in a museum survey at the Arkansas Museum of Fine Arts, curated by sculptor Robert Stackhouse. This large painting, entitled “Blue” featured a mixed media beeswax surface painted sky blue with fragments of handwriting and scrawled signs drawn in pencil and asphalt spilling across the surface. At this time he then began exhibiting at Elliot Smith Contemporary Art, garnering significant media attention at the premier gallery operating in a 1,200 square-foot former luxury-car showroom, which held concurrent notable shows such as Richard Serra etchings. In 2000, writing for Art in America, Ann Wilson-Lloyd highlighted the “large, organic abstract paintings of Maxwell Stevens” in a feature length article entitled “Art Under the Arch- Report from St. Louis.” Art critic Jeff Daniel took note as well, writing “At Elliot Smith…Maxwell Stevens, whose ‘Love’s Frost’ manages to present oil paint so wonderfully thick that the square piece resembles a futuristic piece of plastic sod” and praising the wave-like movements in the larger canvases.

The St. Louis Post-Dispatch Reviewer Brian Smith went further, observing “Stevens’ obsessive mark-making – a process that results in textures becoming forms in and of themselves, speaks to different traditions, both Asian and Western. Small, physically compelling and heavily textured oils at first look like slabs of sod – even swatches of shag carpet. Larger works evoke landscape, and the medium-sized pieces refer to an enlarged microscopic world.” The author summarized that the “result is that of a young, directed artist developing intelligent work in a sophisticated way.”

In 2001, he and his wife, an Interior Designer he met in Atlanta, relocated to Houston, renting a carriage house several blocks from the Menil Collection in Houston's Museum District, which would also serve as his studio. While living in Houston, he continued his exploration of color, texture, and surface in his ongoing Hypertexture series, as well as his abstract drawings on vellum, exhibiting with prominent galleries such as Devin Borden-Hiram Butler Gallery, Hooks-Epstein Galleries, and New Gallery, the latter of which had begun collaborating with the influential Stux Gallery in New York. Maxwell was also participating in notable group shows in New York and throughout the United States at this point.

Shortly after moving to New York City in 2004, Maxwell Stevens embarked on perhaps his most significant stylistic shift in approach to his art. He began composing his canvases with recognizable imagery, incorporating photorealist figures and lifelike scenes into his works, and then abruptly superposing these paintings directly with tumultuous abstractions. The possibilities with his newly invented approach allowed him to introduce a wide range of content and narrative situations into what would otherwise remain a purely abstract picture, opening up to new subject matter while raising important questions about the very nature of representation in art, while pushing the limits of painterly abstraction.

His debut solo exhibition in New York City featured provocative nudes overpainted with abstract improvisations, and was held at Thomas Werner Gallery in Manhattan's Chelsea Gallery District from September 1- October 1, 2006. This was the first reintroduction of the figure into his work in over a decade, and a crucial point in the development of his artistic practice. Based on the poetic language, physical embraces, and overt sexuality of the Kamasutra, these painted images became clear and graphically confrontational within the windows created by abstract lines, smears, and brushstrokes on top. Sometimes the brushstrokes are sharp with more defined shapes and contours, while other times, Maxwell's style seems to land on these softer abstract forms. Early paintings from the series were executed with a soft-focus effect that lends these works an edgy and atmospheric mood. Despite being an “illusion painted” the contraposition of the abstract –a natural signal real in itself and somehow out of this world, against the representational artificial signs, which have meaning other than themselves, heightens this tension. This juxtaposition produces an effect that lies between the universal and the particular, causing everyone to see or feel something different in Maxwell's paintings.

Around 2007, Maxwell Stevens met Amy L. Brandt, Assistant Curator at the Brooklyn Museum, New York, who then moved onto Pace Gallery and would later become McKinnon Curator of Modern and Contemporary Art at the Chrysler Museum of Art in Norfolk, VA. Their friendship led to intensely thought-provoking conversations on the interplay of painting and neo-conceptual art, some of which influenced ideas for her seminal book Interplay (MIT Press). In return, Brandt's input on Maxwell's paintings and ideas assisted in providing an intellectual discourse as his work continued to expand. During this time he began exhibiting with the art dealer Björn Ressle, whose uptown exhibition program included many pivotal figures in the contemporary art scene including Joseph Beuys, Cy Twombly, and Dorothea Rockburne among others, giving the artist a strong context in which to present his paintings and drawings. His drawings are similar to his paintings, with images of figures and nudes superimposed with complex layers of calligraphic linework drawn with ink and brush, and with technical pens. Executed most often in pencil, charcoal, and pastel, the images are overlaid with a sheet of parchment or clear vellum, which then becomes the basis for the topographical ink drawing. The relatively smaller scale drawings are opportunities for exploration made during the time between paintings.

In 2015, he was invited by the Japanese-born Minimalist artist Kazuko Miyamoto to participate in a group exhibition at Gallery Onetwentyeight on the Lower East Side. As Manhattan's longest running Lower East Side gallery, it is significant as a female owned establishment as well as for its experimental programming which has included many international emerging artists as well as mid-career and major artists over the years from Jean-Michel Basquiat and Thomas Nozkowski to David Hammons and Eva LeWitt, to name a few. This would be followed by an influential group show, entitled “Hypercalligraphic” which was featured as a Curator's Pick in the Museum of Modern Art’s Drawing and Painting Bulletin, and included a Sol LeWitt Wall Drawing and works by Miyamoto herself. Miyamoto, a close collaborator, assistant, and friend of Sol LeWitt, and a major figure of the Minimal and post-Minimal art scene in New York, then invited Maxwell Stevens to mount a solo show in what would become the first of his three groundbreaking exhibitions at Onetwentyeight. Many of the drawings and paintings Maxwell created during this time have since been exhibited internationally in cities from Tokyo to Dallas to New York.

In the following years the artist began further incorporating psychologically compelling scenes from daily life, testing the boundaries of painterly abstraction and photorealism within the context of contemporary portraiture and delicately painted modern interiors. As soon as these overpainted domestic scenes were exhibited, the painting exhibition quickly attracted critical attention. Referring to his Summer Table Paintings in 2016, the artist stated,

“I’m interested in the domestic arena as the primary site for our psychological and emotional experiences, and in how we exist differently, historically, within each passing moment. I try to use abstraction and the fragmentation of representational imagery to evoke this.”

This new period is clearly identifiable by large abstract painted gestures superimposed directly on top of photorealist paintings that have become increasingly descriptive, with each series correlating the seasons, Spring, Summer, Autumn, Winter, around a deeply personal and often autobiographical theme. In an essay entitled Maxwell Stevens: Thesis, Antithesis & Synthesis, NYArts Magazine observed “These vivid gestures of thick impasto grow invariably in an upwards motion as abrupt expressions that reach the viewer with immediate emotional charge and the space far beyond the canvas.” By dramatically increasing the surface tension of the canvases, from the chaotic clouds of brushstrokes that remain individually visible underneath, to the bowlike tension of a unified flat and hard mirror surface, the artist makes them most accessible to the viewer. Writing for Meer Magazine, Art Critic Alejandro Pardo summarized the paintings this way, “The surface you see becomes both the frontier that separates, and the gate that opens and integrates the outer and inner spaces.”
