= Robert Hernreich =

American businessman

- Born: Robert Eastman Hernreich; 1945 (age 79–80); Arkansas
- Education: Washington University in St. Louis (BA, MBA)
- Spouse: Nancy Virginia McAvoy (m. 1968)

Robert Eastman Hernreich (born 1945) is an American businessman, professional sports team owner, and philanthropist.

Hernreich is currently part-owner and club director of Swansea City, the Championship League soccer team based in Swansea, Wales, as well as part-owner of Washington DC's DC United soccer club. He is Chairman of the Board of Remonov + CO, a real estate development firm in the Vail Valley of Colorado.

== Early life and education ==
Hernreich was born in Arkansas to parents George Terry Hernreich: a local radio station and television station owner and Mary Jane Proulx. Hernreich also had a sister named Cindy. Hernreich grew up in Fort Smith, Arkansas and graduated with a BA from Washington University in St. Louis and an MBA from Washington University's Olin Business School in 1967. Hernreich was a member of the Phi Delta Theta fraternity and Omicron Delta Kappa honor society.

He was drafted into the Army during the Vietnam War, but was not deployed overseas.

== Business career ==
Hernreich established KAIT 8 in Jonesboro, Arkansas in 1963 with his father. After growing and acquiring a number of related media outlets throughout NW Arkansas, Hernreich sold his media group, Sigma Broadcasting, to Channel Communications in 1984 and Hearst-Argyle in 1995. At the time, Sigma was the largest media company in the state.

From 1991 to 1993 Hernreich served as chairman of United States Repeating Arms, maker of Winchester rifles. He is also a past director of Ride Snowboards, K2 Inc. and the Miss America Organization

In 1994, Hernreich founded Remonov and began developing real estate in Colorado's Vail Valley.

== Sports ownership ==
As part of a new ownership group led by the Maloof family, Hernreich bought a 12% stake in the Sacramento Kings in 1999. In 2013, Microsoft’s Steve Balmer and hedge fund manager Chris Hansen tried to buy the Kings and move them to Seattle, but bowing to local pressure, Hernreich and the Maloofs instead sold the Kings to investors led by Vivek Ranadive for a record price, then the highest ever for an NBA franchise. As a result of that sale, the team stayed in Sacramento.

As part of his Kings ownership, Hernreich was also part owner of the WNBA's Sacramento Monarchs.

In 2005, Hernreich purchased the Arizona Rattlers of the Arena Football League. He sold the team in 2008.

In 2010, Hernreich bought an undisclosed stake in the Texas Rangers as part of a group led by pitcher Nolan Ryan and lawyer Chuck Greenberg.

== Civic life and philanthropy ==
Hernreich has served on the board of directors of the Vail Valley Foundation (VVF), Beaver Creek’s Vilar Center for the Arts and the Eagle Valley Land Trust. He was past chairman of the Colorado Board of Parks and Outdoor Recreation.

He was a founding board member of SOS Outreach (serving at-risk youth) and the Vail Youth Foundation. He served as the Administration Chairman for the 1999 World Alpine Championships in Vail. Hernreich is a member of the VVF Millennium Club, a small group who have contributed in their lifetimes more than $1 million to the VVF.

He has served as Trustee of his alma mater, Washington University in St. Louis, MO for 30 years.

== Personal life ==
Hernreich married to Nancy Virginia McAvoy in September 1968. The couple divorced at some point before 2001.

=== Legal Issues ===
On December 21, 2007, Hernreich was arrested in Eagle County, Colorado and booked for misdemeanor charges of "domestic violence, harassment, and second-degree criminal trespass".
