= Benjamin Movsas =

- Education: Harvard, Washington University in St. Louis
- Scientific career
- Workplaces: Henry Ford Hospital, Fox Chase Cancer Center

Benjamin Movsas is an American radiation oncologist. He is the chairman of the Department of Radiation Oncology at the Henry Ford Cancer Institute, Henry Ford Hospital.

== Biography ==
Movsas was educated at Harvard University and Washington University School of Medicine (1990). He previously held the position of vice-chair of the Department of Radiation Oncology at the Fox Chase Cancer Center. He is also a leader in several nationwide multi-center clinical trials. Currently, he serves as the Chairman of the Radiation Therapy Oncology Group Quality of Life Committee and the National Patterns of Care Lung Committee within the American College of Radiology. He serves on the board of directors of the American Society for Radiation Oncology. He is a Fellow and past president of the American Radium Society.

He is married to Tammy Z. Movsas, who also is a physician. They have four children.
