= Peter O. Price =

American media executive

- Born: 1940 (age 85–86); Philadelphia, Pennsylvania
- Education: Princeton University
- Occupation: Media executive
- Spouse: Judith Price

Peter O. Price is chairman and chief executive of Premiere Previews, which invests in new media ventures. Price began his media career as a summer intern at The Wall Street Journal while attending Princeton University, where he graduated with honors in 1962. He subsequently graduated from Yale Law School, and then served as an officer in the United States Air Force before joining New York City government as counsel to the Taxi Commission, when he was also counsel to the New York Council on Child Psychiatry.

== Early life and education ==
Price was born in Philadelphia, Pennsylvania, where he attended Friends Select School. He attended Princeton University, graduating with honors in 1962. He subsequently graduated from Yale Law School; after graduation, he served as an officer in the United States Air Force.

== Career ==
Price began his media career as a summer intern at the Wall Street Journal while he attended Princeton University. After his stint in the United States Air Force, Price moved to New York City, where he served in city government as Counsel To The Taxi Commission and as Counsel to the New York Council on Child Psychiatry.

Price began his professional career as director of corporate development for Time Inc., before becoming president of Media Networks, publisher of the New York Post, president of the National Sports Daily, president of Liberty Cable, president of Television USA, president and chief executive officer of the National Academy of Television Arts and Sciences, and founder of The New York Times Film Club. He was most recently Managing Partner of a venture with Dow Jones. He is now a Managing Partner of a venture with The Columbia Business School, Bloomberg, and Morgan Stanley.

Price is active in educational and civic affairs. He was chairman of the board of governors of Eugene Lang College, a trustee of The New School University, a member of the Conference of University Board Chairmen, and founding chairman of the International Chapter of The Young Presidents Organization. He was also founding chairman of The World University, a venture with NBC, and Qubed Education, a venture with Conde Nast. Price has served as chairman of the Video Dial Tone Association in Washington, D.C., and has advised the government of France on telecommunications policy, for which he received "La Médaille de la Ville de Paris" from the mayor of Paris.

He is currently chairman of The Avenue Association, a director of RKO Pictures, a commissioner of the Latin Entertainment and Media Commission. In 2009 Price was asked by Mayor Bloomberg to chair MediaNYC2020 to formulate the digital media strategy for New York City. In 2010 he assumed the chairmanship of Reporters Without Borders in the United States. In 2011, he was appointed a strategic advisor to Intel Media, and chairman of the Beijing CEO Roundtable.

== Personal life ==
Price is married to Judith Price, founder of both Avenue Magazine and the National Jewelry Institute, where she currently serves as president. They live in New York and Paris, where he serves as Chairman of Parsons Paris Advisory Board.
