= NFL Countdown =

NFL Countdown may refer to the following ESPN pregame shows that cover the National Football League:

- Sunday NFL Countdown
- Monday Night Countdown
