= Arnold W. Donald =

American business executive (born 1954)

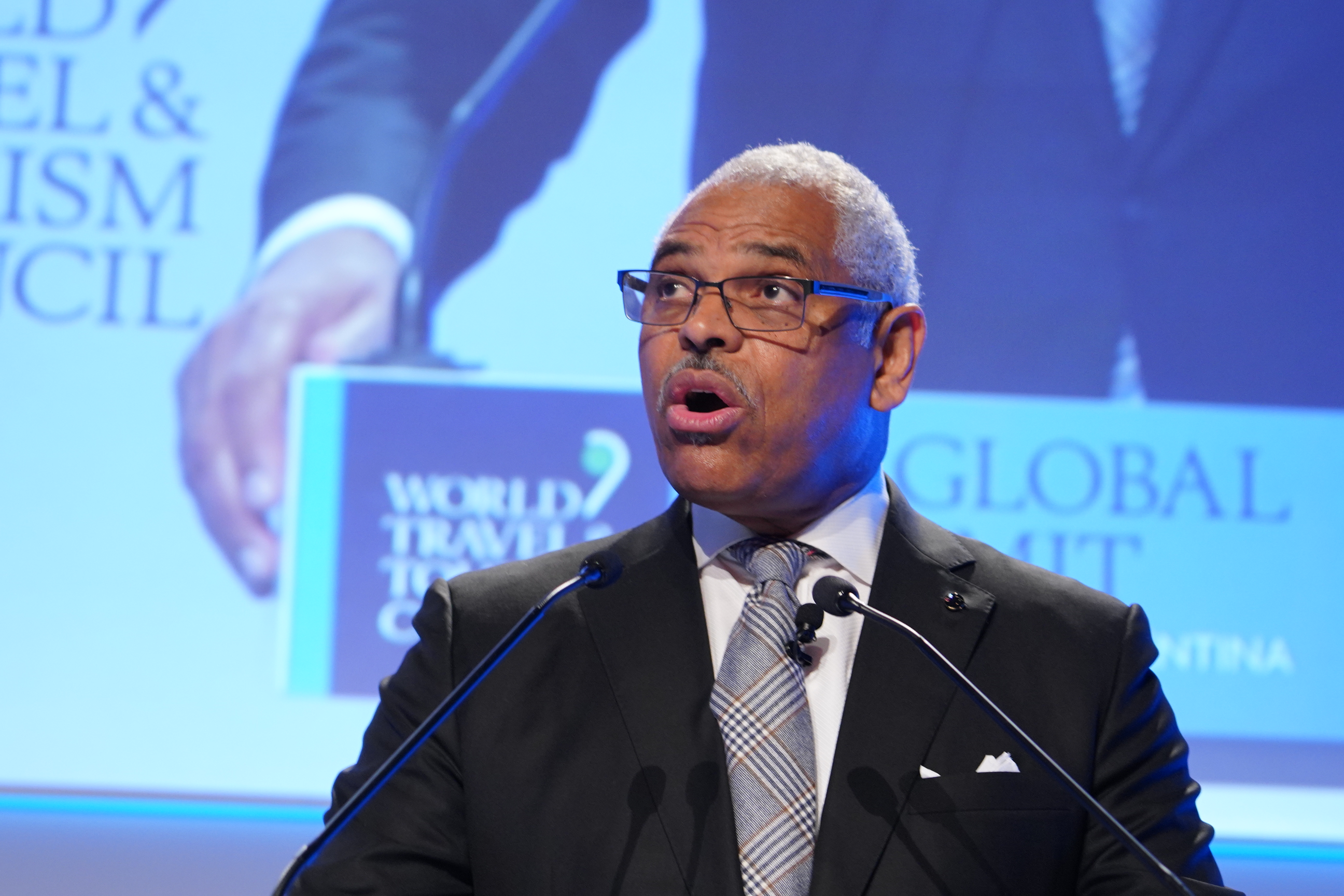
- Born: December 17, 1954 (age 71); New Orleans, Louisiana, U.S.
- Education: Carleton College; Washington University; University of Chicago
- Occupation: Business executive
- Title: Vice chairman, Carnival Corporation & plc
- Term: August 2022-November 2022
- Board member of: Carnival Corporation

Arnold W. Donald (born December 17, 1954) is an American business executive. He was the chief executive officer (CEO) of Carnival Corporation & plc from July 2013 to August 2022, when he became vice-chairman of the company's board until November 2022.

== Early life and education ==
Donald was born and raised in New Orleans, Louisiana. He was raised Catholic and graduated from St. Augustine High School. He grew up in poverty during segregation; his mother was a maid, his father a carpenter, and his sister taught him reading, writing, and basic math.

Donald holds a bachelor's degree in economics from Carleton College in 1976 and a bachelor's degree in mechanical engineering from the McKelvey School of Engineering at Washington University in St. Louis in 1977. He received an MBA from the University of Chicago Graduate Booth School Of Business in 1980.

== Career ==
Donald started his career, working at Monsanto in St. Louis and served various positions over 23 years, including as the president at Monsanto's nutrition and consumer sectors and senior vice president of the parent company.

Donald joined Carnival as CEO in July 2013 as the company's third CEO in its 41-year history.

In August 2022, Donald was succeeded as CEO by Josh Weinstein, COO of Carnival; Donald was vice-chairman for the duration of the transition. In November 2022, he stepped down from his position on the board and moved to a consultant role through February 2025.

== Personal life ==
Donald has three children with his wife Hazel.
