= Marshall Brown (architect) =

Architect, professor, urban theorist

Marshall Brown is an American professor of architecture at Princeton University and principal of Marshall Brown Projects, Inc.

== Career ==
A New Jersey native, Brown graduated from Washington University in St. Louis in 1995 and earned master's degrees in architecture and in architecture and urban design from Harvard University. He served as an associate professor at the Illinois Institute of Technology and was appointed an associate professor at Princeton in 2018 and promoted to full professor in 2023. He also directs the Urban Imagination Center at Princeton.

For a number of years, Brown has been working on a large-scale plan for the South Side that he calls “Smooth Growth Urbanism.”

=== Architectural collage artwork ===
Brown's works of architectural collage are in the collections of San Francisco Museum of Modern Art (SFMOMA), Art Institute of Chicago, Crystal Bridges Museum of American Art, Santa Barbara Museum of Art, and the Museum of Contemporary Photography, Columbia College Chicago. From March 27, 2026 to May 30, 2026, he had a solo show of collages with Western Exhibitions in Chicago, his fifth with the gallery.

Brown has had solo exhibitions at SFMOMA (August 2023 to July 2024) and at the Santa Barbara Museum of Art (October 2022 to January 2023). His design for the Dequindre Civic Academy, a 2.7-million-square-foot campus for a school in Detroit, was one of 12 commissioned projects selected from more than 250 submissions in the U.S. Pavilion at the Venice Architecture Biennale in 2016. Entitled "The Architectural Imagination," the show was curated by Cynthia Davidson and Mónica Ponce de León.

=== Publications ===
Brown is the author of two monographs, Recurrent Visions: The Architecture of Marshall Brown Projects, which was published by Princeton Architectural Press in 2022 and The Architecture of Collage: Marshall Brown, which was co-published by Park Books in 2022 with the Santa Barbara Museum of Art.
