= Olin Business School =

Business School at Washington University in St. Louis, Missouri

Olin Business School at Washington University in St. Louis
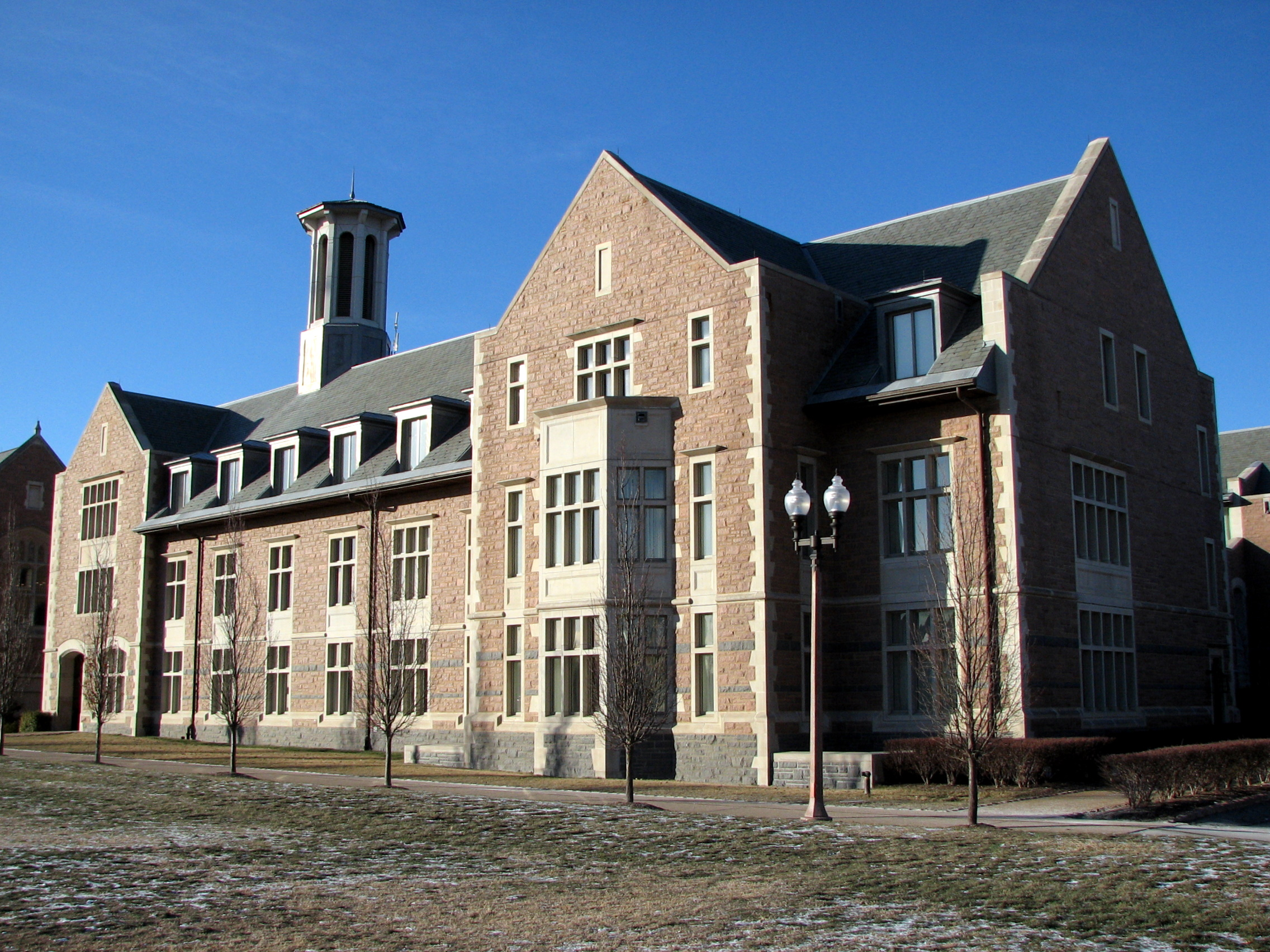
- The Knight Executive Education Center is a part of the school
- Type: Private
- Established: 1917; 109 years ago
- Parent institution: Washington University in St. Louis
- Accreditation: AACSB; EQUIS
- Endowment: US$326 million (2016)
- Dean: Michael J. Mazzeo
- Faculty: 154
- Undergraduates: 837
- Postgraduates: 1557
- Location: St. Louis, Missouri, US; 38°38′53″N 90°18′42″W
- Website: olin.washu.edu

The Olin Business School is the business school and one of seven academic schools at Washington University in St. Louis. The school offers undergraduate, master's, doctoral, and executive programs. It has more than 28,000 alumni as of 2025.

== History ==
Founded in 1917, the business school was renamed for entrepreneur John M. Olin in 1988.

The Olin Business School includes the 80,000 sq ft (7,400 m^{2}) Simon Hall, whose 1986 construction was largely funded by a gift from John E. Simon; Knight and Bauer Halls, whose 2014 construction was largely funded by gifts from Charles F. And Joanne Knight and George and Carol Bauer; and the Charles F. Knight Executive Education and Conference Center, all on the Danforth Campus.

On July 1, 2009, the school took over management of the Brookings Institute's executive management program.

== Programs ==
=== Undergraduate degree ===
==== BSBA Program ====
At Olin, undergraduate students are admitted directly into the BSBA program as freshmen. Inter-division transfers are allowed for students who are in good standing with their current division, can complete the BSBA requirements within 4 years, have completed 2 or more core professional business courses for credit, and have completed Calculus II for credit.

To graduate, students must complete a minimum of 120 units of coursework. 40% of classes must be outside the areas of business. Students can choose from eight different business majors: Accounting, Economics and Strategy, Entrepreneurship, Finance, Healthcare Management, Marketing, Organization and Strategic Management, and Supply Chain, Operations, and Technology. Olin students can also minor in International Business, the Business of the Arts, the Business of Entertainment, or the Business of Sports Management.

Students declare their business administration major (or majors) during their sophomore year. Students can also earn a second major or minor from one of the university's other schools, such as the College of Arts & Sciences, School of Engineering & Applied Science, or Sam Fox School of Design & Visual Arts.

Non-business students from other WUSTL schools also can minor in the following business fields: Accounting, Business Economics, Business of Sports, Business of the Arts, Entrepreneurship, Finance, General Business, Healthcare Management, International Business, Leadership, Marketing, Operations and Supply Chain Management, and Strategy.

=== Masters degree ===
==== MBA Program ====
Business school rankings

U.S. MBA Rankings
- Bloomberg (2025): 30
- U.S. News & World Report (2026): 26 (full-time); 17 (part-time)

Global MBA Rankings
- FT (2026): 49

Olin has four main rounds and after June they have rolling admissions.

Olin's Full-Time MBA program was named the #4 global MBA program for women in the Financial Times (2018). In 2019, the class reached near-gender parity with 49% female students. In October 2019, an Inc. Magazine ranking powered by Poets&Quants ranked Olin as the #1 MBA program in the world for entrepreneurship. In January 2020, Olin was named the Poets&Quants MBA Program of 2019 as a result of a series of radical changes to the program focusing on global immersion.

Students in the full-time MBA program experience three global immersions in the first year of their experience. Students begin with an orientation in St. Louis before spending time in Washington, DC learning about the intersection of business and policy. They then spend time in two international locations; in 2022 the immersion included Barcelona, consulting with local wineries, then Paris, and lastly Santiago, Chile where student teams evaluated production capacity and bottlenecks at three firms.

The MBA curriculum requires completion of 67 credit hours, nearly two-thirds of which are elective courses selected by the student. The fall semester of year one focuses on critical thinking, leadership, career strategy, and the major functional areas of business. During the spring semester of year one and throughout year two, students take mostly elective courses of their choosing, often following the guidelines of platforms and concentration areas that help students navigate the curriculum toward their career goals. Platforms offered include:

- Consulting
- Corporate Finance and Investments
- Entrepreneurship
- Marketing
- Operations and Supply Chain Management

Olin Business School Full-Time MBA Program Platforms and Concentrations
Platform	Concentration
Consulting	General Management and Internal Consulting
Consulting	International Management
Consulting	Strategy Consulting
Consulting	Human Capital Consulting
Corporate Finance and Investments	Financial Management
Corporate Finance and Investments	Investment Banking - Corporate Finance
Corporate Finance and Investments	Private Equity and Venture Capital
Corporate Finance and Investments	Investment Banking - Capital Markets and Trading
Corporate Finance and Investments	Asset Management
Entrepreneurship	Commercial Entrepreneurship
Entrepreneurship	Social Entrepreneurship
Marketing	Brand Management
Marketing	Product Management
Marketing	Customer Analytics
Operations and Supply Chain	Operations/Supply Chain Management
Operations and Supply Chain	Supply Chain Consulting

Elective courses include semester-long (3 credit) courses, six week "mini" (1.5 credit) courses, and work-study positions. Olin MBAs can also take up to nine credits of approved coursework from other graduate programs at Washington University.

WashU Olin also offers a 20-month Executive MBA and a part-time Flex MBA with the option of online or on-campus courses.

=== Specialized Masters Programs ===
Specialized Masters business degrees can typically be completed in three semesters. Four programs — Master of Science in Supply Chain Management (MSSCM), Master of Science in Business Analytics (MSA), Master of Science in Finance-Wealth and Asset Management (MSFWAM), and Master of Science in Finance-Quantitative Finance (MSFQ) — hold STEM (Science, Technology, Engineering and Mathematics) designations. The Master of Accounting (MACC) can be structured to meet CPA exam eligibility requirements. Online specialized master's are offered in business analytics and finance.

=== Doctoral Program ===
There are usually 80 students enrolled in the Ph.D program. A DBA in finance also is offered for individuals pursuing applied research in corporations, banks, government and consulting.

=== Exchange Programs ===
MBA students can choose to study one semester at Manchester Business School in the United Kingdom, Hong Kong University of Science & Technology in Hong Kong; Otto Beisheim Graduate School of Management at WHU-Koblenz in Koblenz, Germany; École Management de Lyon (EM Lyon) in Lyon, Paris Dauphine University, France; the Institute for Advanced Studies in Administration (IESA) in Caracas, Venezuela; ESADE (Escuela Superior De Administracion Y Direccion De Empresas) in Barcelona, Spain; Bocconi University in Milan, Italy or the Indian Institute of Management Ahmedabad and Indian Institute of Management Calcutta in India.

=== Executive Programs ===
The school's Executive Programs group, consisting of Executive MBA and Executive Education, is located in the Charles F. Knight Executive Education Center on the Danforth Campus. The school also maintains Executive MBA programs in Shanghai (at Fudan University), and Mumbai (at Indian Institute of Technology in Bombay, Shailesh J. Mehta School of Management).

=== Overall Enrollment (2018) ===
Program	Enrollment
Masters	1475
BSBA	837
Doctoral	82

== Resources ==
=== Kopolow Business Library ===
The Kopolow Business Library offers Dow Jones Interactive, Lexis/Nexis, InfoTrac, and ABI, as well as databases provided by Moody's, Standard & Poor's, Hoover's, and Disclosure. The library also receives real-time stock and other market information through the Bloomberg and Bridge Information systems. It holds around 30,000 books and subscribes to more than 400 business journals, magazines, and newspapers.

=== Research centers ===
- Bauer Leadership Center - supports Olin Business School's efforts to develop "values-based leaders".
- Boeing Center for Supply Chain Innovation - Focused collaboration between business and academe. Businesses provide professors and students with access to in-house real-world technology, and these researchers use these data and machines to formulate theories on operations and supply chain management to better improve logistics and processes.
- Center for Analytics and Business Insights – offers opportunities for faculty, students, and companies to collaborate on analysis and research.
- Center for Research in Economics and Strategy – supports scientific research to advance understanding of firms and markets.
- Koch Center for Family Business - engages the next generation of family business leaders and connects them to resources they need to succeed.
- Reuben C. Taylor Experimental Laboratory - a high-technology facility for conducting experimental research to analyze negotiation, market behavior, and decision making. Included in the laboratory is a computer network that allows participants to make decisions and communicate with others in real-time.
- Skandalaris Center for Interdisciplinary Innovation and Entrepreneurship - established in 2004 with a grant from the Kauffman Foundation. Focuses on corporate innovation, application and commercialization for early-stage science, student-initiated ventures, social entrepreneurship, and connecting the University with the St. Louis start-up community.
- Wells Fargo Advisors Center for Finance and Accounting Research - supports collaborative research with finance and accounting industry by encouraging faculty and students to work more closely with companies.

== Notable alumni ==
=== Business ===
- John H. Biggs (PhD): former CEO of TIAA-CREF
- Steve Fossett (MBA 1968): options trader, balloonist, and adventurer
- Sam Fox (BSBA 1951): founder, chairman, CEO, and owner of Harbour Group Industries
- Edward Mueller (MBA): president and CEO of Qwest Communications
- David Peacock (MBA): president of Anheuser-Busch
- William Shaw (MBA 1972): president and COO of Marriott International Inc.
- Jack C. Taylor (student through 1944): founder of Enterprise Rent-A-Car; no. 14 on Forbes 400 Richest Americans in 2006
- Jim Weddle (AB 1977, MBA): managing partner at Edward Jones Investments
- John B. Whyte (attended two years in 1950s): Developer of Fire Island Pines, New York
- George Zimmer (AB 1970): founder of Men's Wearhouse
- Lee Fixel, founder of Addition
- Wade Miquelon, former CEO of Jo-Ann Stores
- Radhika Aggarwal, Cofounder of ShopClues
- Ruthie Davis, Founder
- Ernesto Fajardo, CEO of Alpina
- Stephan H. Haeckel
- W. Patrick McGinnis, former CEO of Nestlé Purina PetCare Company

=== Politics and government ===
- Fahd Al-Rasheed, CEO of Royal Commission for Riyadh City
- Siniša Mali, Deputy Prime Minister of Serbia
- Jasna Matić, Serbian business consultant
- Allen Icet, Collector of Revenue for Greene County

=== Athletics ===
- Avram Glazer (BSBA 1982): Chairman of Manchester United
- Gabriel Aguilar, professional footballer
- Bill Bergesch (BA 1946), major league baseball scout and front office executive (various teams, including the New York Yankees; Cincinnati Reds)
- Robb Butler, former football defensive back
- Robert Hernreich, club director of Swansea City
- Larry Station, football player.
- Julie Uhrman, President of Angel City FC
- Lewis Wolff, owner of Oakland Athletics and co-owner of San Jose Earthquakes

=== Jurists ===
- Raymond Gruender, Judge of the United States Court of Appeals for the Eighth Circuit
- Chris Koster, 41st Attorney General of Missouri

=== Arts and others ===
- David Dorfman, choreographer
- Gregory Millman, journalist and author
- Zachary Abel, American actor
- Richa Gangopadhyay, actress and model
- Tom Leutwiler

== Faculty ==
- Philip H. Dybvig, Nobel Prize in Economics (2022)

== See also ==
- List of Washington University alumni
- List of Washington University faculty and staff
