= List of Washington University faculty and staff =

This is a list of faculty and staff of Washington University in St. Louis.

== Arts and sciences ==
Name	Field	Notability	Joined the faculty
Patty Jo Watson	Anthropology	Fellow of American Academy of Arts and Sciences (1997)	
Lee Robins	Anthropology	Fellow of American Academy of Arts and Sciences (1999)	
Florence Moog	Biology	Her research on enzymes in the intestinal tract led to a therapy to bring about normal lung functioning in premature infants	
Douglass Cecil North	Economics	Nobel prize (1994), fellow of American Academy of Arts and Sciences (1987)	
Robert A. Pollak	Economics	Fellow of American Academy of Arts and Sciences (1999)	
Murray L. Weidenbaum	Economics	Fellow of American Academy of Arts and Sciences (2005)	
Barbara Anna Schaal	Evolutionary Biology	Fellow of American Academy of Arts and Sciences (2006)	
William Howard Gass	Literature	Fellow of American Academy of Arts and Sciences (1982)	
Carl Phillips	Literature	Fellow of American Academy of Arts and Sciences (2004)	
Gerald Lyn Early	Literary Criticism	Fellow of American Academy of Arts and Sciences (1997)	
Nobuo Suga	NeuroSciences	Fellow of American Academy of Arts and Sciences (1992)	
Marcus E. Raichle	NeuroSciences	Fellow of American Academy of Arts and Sciences (1998)	
Clifford M. Will	Physics	Fellow of American Academy of Arts and Sciences (2002)	
Henry L. Roediger III	Psychology	Fellow of American Academy of Arts and Sciences (2005)	
Mark S. Wrighton	Chemistry	Fellow of American Academy of Arts and Sciences (1988)	
William Henry Danforth	Medicine	Fellow of American Academy of Arts and Sciences (1982)	

=== School of Medicine ===
Name	Position	Notability	Joined the faculty
David Morris Kipnis	Professor of Medicine	National Institute of Medicine 1974	
Stuart Kornfeld	Professor of Medicine	National Institute of Medicine 1988	
Emil Raphael Unanue	Professor of Medicine	National Institute of Medicine 1989	
Kenneth Marc Ludmerer	Professor of Medicine	National Institute of Medicine 2002	

== National Academy of Medicine ==
- C. Robert Cloninger, Wallace Renard Professor and Director, Center for Psychobiology of Personality
- Graham Colditz, Niess-Gain Professor in Medicine Department of Surgery
- William Henry Danforth, Chancellor
- Eric M. Genden, Excellence in Teaching Award, 1998
- David M. Kipnis, Distinguished University Professor
- Stuart Kornfeld, David C. and Betty Farrell Professor of Medicine and Biochemistry
- Timothy J. Ley, Alan and Edith Wolff Professor of Medicine Professor of Genetics
- Colin Nichols, Carl Cori Endowed Professor
- Emil R. Unanue, Department of Pathology, Paul and Ellen Lacy Professor of Pathology

== National Academy of Engineering ==
=== Bioengineering ===
- 2022: Farshid Guilak, Mildred B. Simon Professor of Orthopaedic Surgery and Biomedical Engineering

=== Computer Science and Engineering ===
- 2007: Jonathan S. Turner
- Roch Guérin, Harold B. & Adelaide G. Welge Professor of Computer Science, and chair of the Computer Science & Engineering Department

=== Electric Power/Energy Systems Engineering ===
- 1984: John Zaborszky

== National Academy of Sciences ==
=== Anthropology ===
- 1988: Patty Jo Watson, Department of Anthropology, Edward Mallinckrodt Distinguished University Professor of Archaeology
- 1996: Erik Trinkaus, Department of Anthropology, Mary Tileston Hemenway Professor of Physical Anthropology

=== Chemistry ===
- 1966: S.I. Weissman, Department of Chemistry

=== Evolutionary Biology ===
- 1999: Barbara A. Schaal, Department of Biology, first female vice president of the NAS

=== Immunology ===
- 1987: Emil R. Unanue, Department of Pathology, Paul and Ellen Lacy Professor of Pathology
- 2007: Wayne Yokoyama, winner of the Lee C. Howley Prize (for arthritis research), researched natural killer cells' role in immunology

=== Medical Genetics, Hematology, and Oncology ===
- 1982: Stuart Kornfeld, winner of the 2010 George M. Kober Medal from the Association of American Physicians
- 1986: Philip Majerus

=== Medical Physiology and Metabolism ===
- 2001: Jeffrey Gordon

=== Physics ===
- 1927: Arthur Holly Compton
- 1943: Lee A. DuBridge
- 1944: Edward Condon
- 1968: Henry Primakoff
- 1973: Robert M. Walker (geophysics)
- 1975: Eugene Feenberg
- 2004: Ramanath Cowsik
- 2007: Clifford Will

=== Psychology ===
- 1979: Ira Hirsh

== Nobel laureates ==
=== Chemistry ===
- 1970: Luis F. Leloir, Faculty of Medicine 1944
- 1980: Paul Berg, Faculty of Medicine 1954–1959
- 2004: Aaron Ciechanover, M.D., D.Sc., Research Distinguished Professor of Biochemistry at Technion-Israel Institute of Technology in Haifa, Israel and Visiting Professor of Pediatrics 1987–

=== Economic Science ===
- 1993: Douglass C. North (1920–2015), Faculty of Arts and Sciences, 1983–
- 2022: Philip H. Dybvig, Faculty of Olin Business School, 1990–

=== Medicine & Physiology ===
- 1943: Edward A. Doisy (1893–1986), Faculty of Medicine, 1919–1923
- 1944: Joseph Erlanger (1874–1965), chairman, Department of Physiology 1910–1946
- 1944: Herbert Gasser (1888–1963), Faculty of Medicine, 1916–1931
- 1947: Carl F. Cori (1896–1984), Faculty of Medicine 1931–1984
- 1947: Gerty T. Cori (1896–1957), Faculty of Medicine 1931–1957
- 1959: Arthur Kornberg, chairman, Department of Microbiology, 1952–1959
- 1959: Severo Ochoa, Faculty of Medicine 1940–1942
- 1969: Alfred Hershey (1908–1997), Faculty of Medicine 1934–1950
- 1971: Earl Sutherland (1915–1974), M.D. 42, resident in Internal Medicine 1943–1945, Faculty of Medicine, 1945–1953
- 1974: Christian de Duve, Faculty of Medicine 1946–1947
- 1978: Daniel Nathans (1928–1999), M.D. 54
- 1978: Hamilton O. Smith, Washington University Medical Service 1956–1957
- 1980: George D. Snell, Faculty of Arts and Sciences 1933–1934
- 1986: Stanley Cohen, Faculty of Arts and Sciences 1953–1959
- 1986: Rita Levi-Montalcini (1909–2012), Faculty of Arts and Sciences, 1948-
- 1992: Edwin G. Krebs, M.D. 43, resident in Internal Medicine; Research Fellow in Biological Chemistry 1945–1948
- 1998: Robert F. Furchgott, Ph.D. Faculty of Medicine, 1949–1956

=== Physics ===
- 1927: Arthur H. Compton (1892–1962), Faculty of Arts and Sciences 1920–1923 and 1945–1962, chancellor 1945–1953
