= Pat McGinnis =

Pat McGinnis may refer to:

- W. Patrick McGinnis, former CEO of Purina
- Pat Maginnis, abortion activist (misspelling)
