= Alexandra Grant =

American visual artist (born 1973)

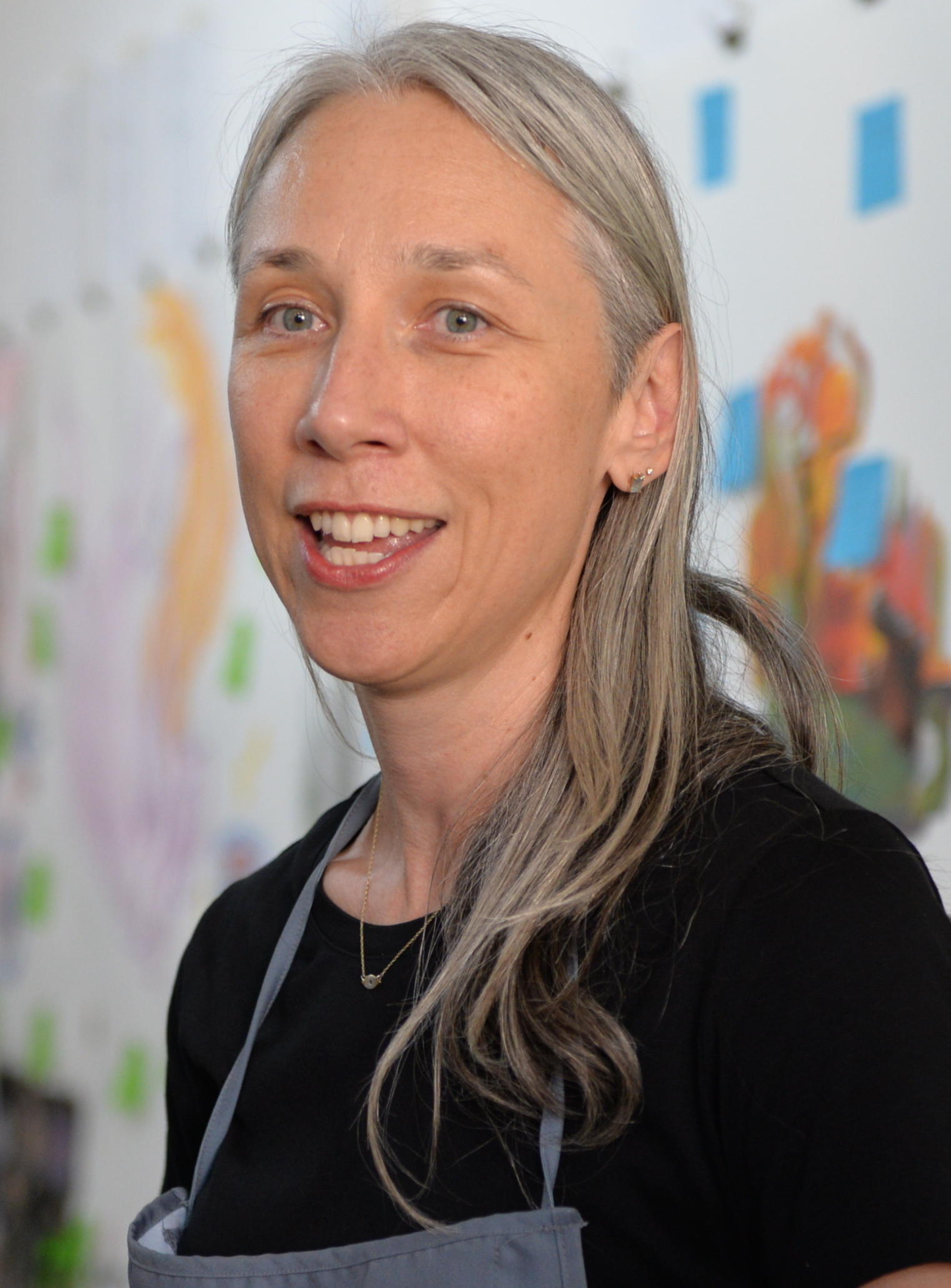
- Grant in 2014
- Born: April 4, 1973 (age 53); Fairview Park, Ohio, U.S.
- Education: Thomas Jefferson School; International School of Paris
- Alma mater: Swarthmore College; California College of the Arts
- Occupation: Visual artist
- Years active: 2000–present
- Partner(s): Keanu Reeves (c. 2018–present) (Note: Although Reeves and Grant have had a business relationship publishing books that began shortly after they met in 2009, they only went public with their personal relationship in November 2019.)
- Website: alexandragrant.com

Alexandra Grant (born April 4, 1973) is an American visual artist who examines language and written texts through painting, drawing, sculpture, video, and other media. She uses language and exchanges with writers as a source for much of that work. Grant examines the process of writing and ideas based in linguistic theory as it connects to art and creates visual images inspired by text and collaborative group installations based on that process. She is based in Los Angeles.

== Early life ==
Grant was born in Fairview Park, Ohio, on April 4, 1973. Her father was a Scottish geology professor who had moved to Ohio's Oberlin College in 1969. Her mother was an American political science professor, foreign-service diplomat, and educational administrator based in Africa and the Middle East. Her parents, who both spent time in Africa, divorced when she was young and she lived with her mother, who was based in Mexico City. In Mexico City, she attended a British school that was made up of a multi-national student body. When she was 11 years old, Grant attended a boarding school, the Thomas Jefferson School, in St. Louis, Missouri, for a year. Shortly thereafter, she moved with her mother to Paris, where she attended the International School of Paris. From these experiences in various locations in Europe and the Middle East, Grant is multi-lingual, and speaks English, Spanish, and French.

In 1995, Grant graduated from Swarthmore College with a BA in history and studio art. In 2000, Grant graduated from San Francisco's California College of the Arts with an MFA in drawing and painting.

== Career ==
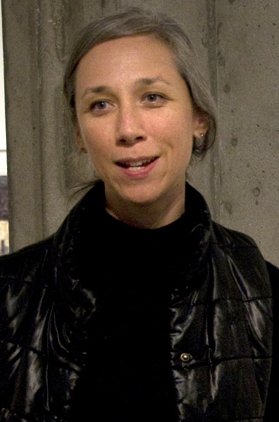
Grant in November 2009

In 2007, Grant had her first solo exhibition at the Museum of Contemporary Art (MOCA) in Los Angeles, curated by Alma Ruiz. A catalog from the exhibition features Grant's large-scale works on paper, an essay on Grant's work by Ruiz, and an essay that inspired Grant by the French writer and philosopher Hélène Cixous. Grant's artworks joined a multi-artist show in Tel Aviv in 2008, titled "From and About Place: Art from Los Angeles".

Grant's work has been described as a "radical collaboration", that is, work made in collaboration with the text and work of other writers and artists, and is often participatory and ongoing. The longest exchange has been with the pioneering writer of hypertext fiction, Michael Joyce. The paintings and sculpture based on Joyce's texts (using them as scores or scripts to interpret rather than follow) have been the subject of at least three series: the "Ladder Quartet" (shown at MOCA in 2007), the "Six Portals" (shown at Honor Fraser gallery in 2008), and "Bodies" (shown at Honor Fraser gallery in 2010).

In 2008, she participated in Edgar Arceneaux’s Watts House Project, a non-profit group that aimed to renovate houses across the Watts Towers, in Los Angeles. Each of the households who agreed to participate in the project was appointed a team of an artist and an architect to remodel their homes. The initial plan for Grant’s “Love House” was to build a large construction of her brands’ logo (LOVE) over the house. However, years passed with no major constructions taking place to any of the houses and a dispute with the IRS and the Watts House project in general, has prevented it to come to fruition. Grant resigned from the projects’ board but is still raising funds in order to complete the “Love House”.

In 2013, Grant collaborated on twin series of exhibitions with Cixous, based on the latter's book Philippines. The "Forêt Intérieure/Interior Forest” exhibition first took place at 18th Street Arts Center in Santa Monica, and at Mains d’Oeuvres in Saint-Ouen, France. Participants joined Grant in creating large-scale drawings of Cixous's novel, which touched on many themes including telepathy in Cixous and the work of Jacques Derrida and Sigmund Freud. Grant and Cixous spoke about their telepathic relationship in 2013 as part of a conversation from Mains d’Oeuvres to Nottingham Contemporary in 2016. 18th Street Arts Center published the “Forêt Intérieure/Interior Forest” to thank the many participants in the project, a catalog which includes photographs of both exhibitions, and essays by Cixous, Grant, curator Pilar Tompkins Rivas, Robert Nashak, and a transcription of Grant's 2013 conversation with Cixous.

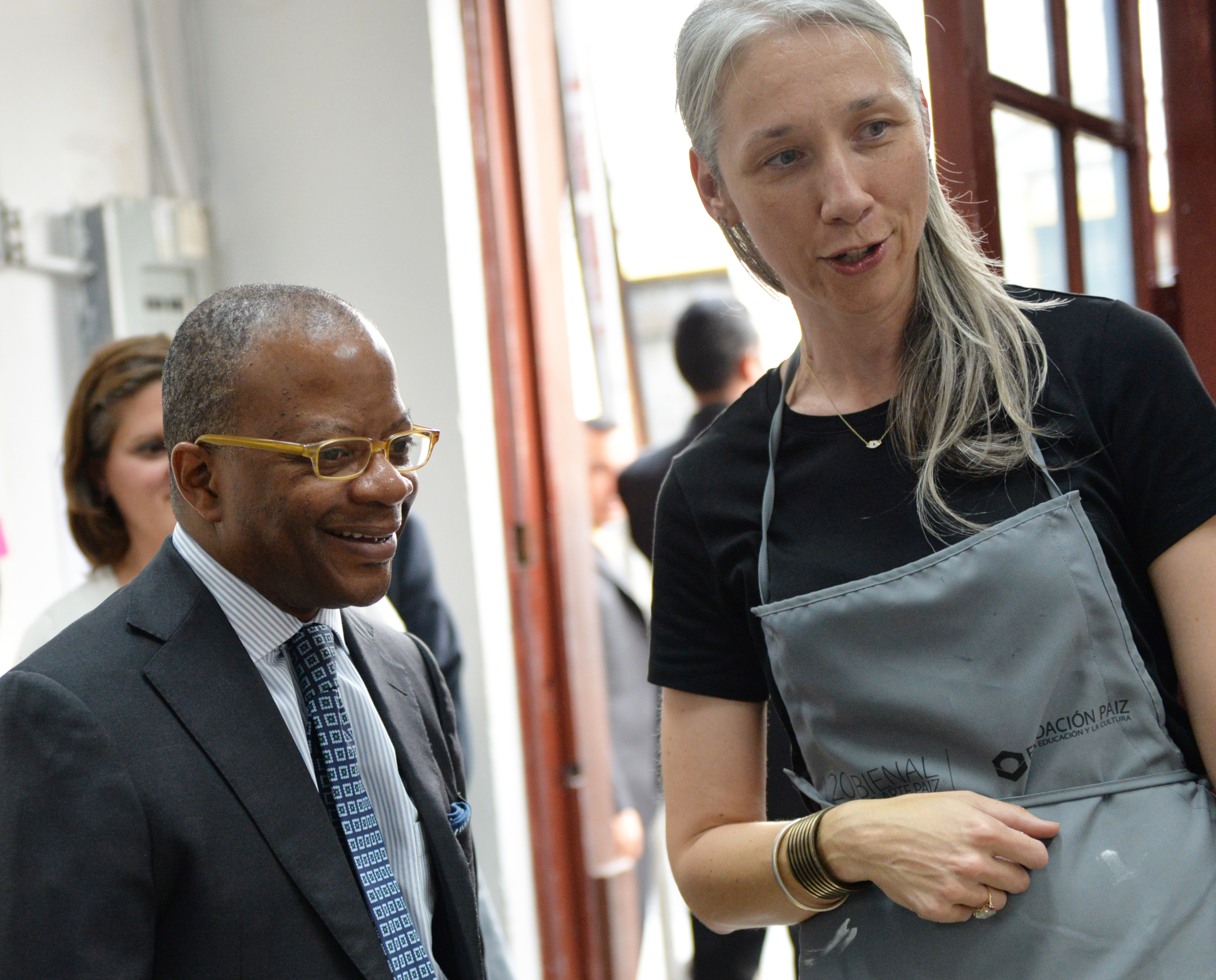
Grant speaking with former United States ambassador to Guatemala Todd D. Robinson in May 2014

In 2013, Grant continued this work in the series called “Century of the Self". The first exhibition was “Drawn to Language" at USC's The Fisher Museum in 2013, followed by a show at Lora Reynold's Gallery in Austin, TX in 2014, at the 2015 Venice Biennial in an exhibition called “We Must Risk Delight: 20 Artists from Los Angeles” and in a two-person exhibition with Steve Roden at the Pasadena Museum of California Art that was called “These Carnations Defy Language.” These works were inspired by the documentary film Century of the Self by BBC documentarian Adam Curtis.

In 2015, Grant exhibited her work in a painting called “Antigone 3000” inspired by the Greek myth, and specifically a phrase in Sophocles's play where Antigone confronts her uncle Creon—the king—and says, “I was born to love not to hate.” Works from Antigone 3000 have been shown at the Barnsdall Art Center, when Grant won the City of Los Angeles Mid-Career Artist Award (COLA) in 2015 and most recently in 2017 at the Los Angeles County Museum of Art (LACMA) as part of the exhibition “L.A. Exuberance: Recent Gifts by Artists.”

In 2017, Grant wrote the text for "Antigone is me" with her sister, Florence Grant, which is meant to capture the ancient Greek myth Antigone in a contemporary scene. The exhibit was a community-based project installation held at The Eastern Star Gallery at The Archer School for Girls in Los Angeles.

Grant has cited R.B. Kitaj as an influence.

=== Teaching ===
Grant has worked as a professor. From 2009 to 2011, she was an adjunct professor at Art Center College of Design (Pasadena, CA). In 2010, Grant taught an MFA seminar at Cal State Northridge and from 2013 to 2014 was a mentor in the Pacific Northwest College of Art's Distance MFA program. In 2015, Grant was an MFA program mentor at Syracuse University, and co-taught a course with Isabelle Lutterodt at Ashesi University in Accra, Ghana.

=== Film ===
In 2015, as part of a residency at the Bemis Center for Contemporary Art in Omaha, Nebraska, Grant directed a documentary film called Taking Lena Home. The film was about returning a stolen tombstone to rural Nebraska.

=== Books ===
In 2009, Grant met actor Keanu Reeves at a social event. This led to Ode to Happiness, published by Gerhard Steidl in early 2011, Grant's first collaboration with Reeves. It was Grant's first artist book and Reeves's first book as a writer.

In 2016, Grant and Reeves reunited for their second collaboration, Shadows, a book and suite of photographic images printed by Steidl in Germany. The photographs were exhibited at ACME Gallery in Los Angeles, and Ochi Gallery in Sun Valley, ID. As part of the release of the book, Grant did a collaboration with artist Alia Raza for Issue magazine that featured fashion and shadows.

=== X Artists' Books ===
In 2017 Grant, alongside designer Jessica Fleischmann and Keanu Reeves, established a small publishing company called X Artists Books, sometimes abbreviated XAB.

== Personal life ==
In November 2019, Grant and Keanu Reeves appeared as a couple on the red carpet of the LACMA Art + Film Gala, prompting media coverage of their romantic relationship. Grant's friend Jennifer Tilly said they had been dating "for several years". Grant and Reeves had already been photographed as a couple in Switzerland attending the UNAIDS gala in June 2016, and several other times afterward.

== Selected awards and honors ==
- 2011: California Community Foundation, Fellowship for Visual Artists, FVA fellow – Mid-Career Artist Grant
- 2013: 18th Street Arts Center (Santa Monica, CA), residency
- 2015: Bemis Center for Contemporary Art (Omaha, NE), residency
- 2015: City of Los Angeles Cultural Affairs Department, COLA 2015, Individual Artists Fellowship
- 2018: SOMA (Mexico City, Mexico), residency
- 2019: Vermont Studio Center (Johnson, VT), visiting artist

== Selected exhibitions ==
=== Selected solo exhibitions ===
- 2026. "Ein Stern genügt, um an das Licht zu glauben", Neues Museum Nürnberg (Nürnberg, Germany)
- 2026. "Antigone 3000 (Anakainōsis)", albertz benda (New York, NY)
- 2013: "Forêt Intérieure/Interior Forest", 18th Street Arts Center (Santa Monica, CA) and Mains d'Œuvres (Saint-Ouen, France)
- 2016: “ghost town”, 20th Bienal de Arte Paiz (Guatemala City, Guatemala) collaboration with the poet Vania Vargas on a large-scale participatory drawing project
- 2017: "Antigone is you is me", Eastern Star Gallery, Archer School for Girls (Los Angeles, CA)
- 2019: "Born to Love", Lowell Ryan Projects (Los Angeles, CA)
- 2024 “Everything Belongs to the Cosmos,” Carlier | Gebauer (Berlin, Germany)
- 2025 “Ceremony,” John Wolf Fine Art (Los Angeles, CA)

=== Selected group exhibitions ===
- 2026. "Embodied Word", Centre of Contemporary Art (Toruń, Poland)
- 2026: "Iliggocene – The Age of Dizziness", KINDL (Berlin, Germany)
- 2012: "Postscript: Writing After Conceptual Art", Museum of Contemporary Art Denver (Denver, CO)
- 2012: "Drawing Surrealism", Los Angeles County Museum of Art (Los Angeles, CA)
- 2013: "Drawn to Language", work entitled "Century of the Self", USC Fisher Museum of Art (Los Angeles, CA)
- 2014: "Postscript: Writing After Conceptual Art", MSU Broad Museum at Michigan State University (East Lansing, MI)
- 2015: "These Carnations Defy Language" by Alexandra Grant and Steve Roden, Pasadena Museum of California Art (Pasadena, CA)

== Selected publications ==
- Grant, Alexandra; Ruiz, Alma (organized by) (2007). MOCA Focus: Alexandra Grant. Los Angeles: Museum of Contemporary Art. ISBN 9781933751016. OCLC 124037888. – Catalog of an exhibition held at the Museum of Contemporary Art, Los Angeles, Apr. 26-Aug. 13, 2007
- Reeves, Keanu (2011). Bergam, Janey (ed.). Ode to Happiness. Drawings and book design by Alexandra Grant. Göttingen: Steidl Publishers. ISBN 9783869302096. OCLC 756797130.
- Reeves, Keanu (2014). Shadows: A Collaborative Project by Alexandra Grant and Keanu Reeves. Photographs by Alexandra Grant. Göttingen: Steidl Publishers. ISBN 9783869308272. OCLC 965117169.
- Grant, Alexandra (2014). Grasshoppers. Osceola, NE: Polk County Historical Society.
- Cixous, Hélène; Grant, Alexandra; Nashak, Robert (essay by); Rivas, Pilar Tompkins (essay by); Whitelegg, Isobel (essay by) (2016). Forêt intérieure = Interior forest: A participatory art project by Alexandra Grant in collaboration with Hélène Cixous (in English and French). Santa Monica, CA & Saint-Ouen, France: 18th Street Arts Center & Mains d'Oeuvres. ISBN 9780990811916. OCLC 1005899837. Archived from the original (exhibition catalog) on 2019-11-05. – Exhibition at 18th Street Arts Center, Santa Monica, April 15-June 28, 2013, and at Mains d’Œuvres, Saint-Ouen, France, August 24-October 27, 2013
- Grant, Alexandra; Wood, Eve (images by) (2017). The Artists' Prison. South Pasadena: X Artists' Books. ISBN 9780998861616. OCLC 1057672451.

== Selected works ==
- 2004: "she taking her space (after Michael Joyce's "he taking the space of")", Museum of Contemporary Art (MOCA) (Los Angeles, CA)
- 2007: "Wallpaper (la escalera al cielo)", Museum of Contemporary Art (MOCA) (Los Angeles, CA)
- 2016: "Shadow (5)", after Keanu Reeves's “You are not here not even,” Blanton Museum of Art (Austin, TX)
