= Harvey Pitt =

American lawyer (1945–2023)

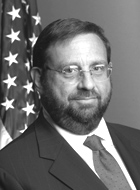

Chair of the Securities and Exchange Commission
- In office August 3, 2001 – February 18, 2003
- President: George W. Bush
- Preceded by: Arthur Levitt
- Succeeded by: William H. Donaldson

Personal details
- Born: February 28, 1945 New York City, New York, U.S.
- Died: May 30, 2023 (aged 78) Washington, D.C., U.S.
- Party: Republican
- Education: Brooklyn College (BA); St. John's University (JD)

Harvey L. Pitt (February 28, 1945 – May 30, 2023) was an American lawyer. He served as the 26th chairman of the United States Securities and Exchange Commission (SEC) for 18 months from August 2001 to February 2003, a period that encompassed the September 11 attacks and the Enron scandal.

Born in Brooklyn, New York, Pitt graduated from Brooklyn College with a bachelor's degree, and from St. John's University School of Law with a Juris Doctor. He then worked at the Securities and Exchange Commission (SEC), eventually becoming the agency's general counsel. Pitt was later a partner at Fried, Frank, Harris, Shriver & Jacobson, where he represented the Big Five accounting firms and other financial industry firms, before returning to the SEC as chairman.

== Early life and education ==
Pitt was born in Crown Heights, Brooklyn, New York, the son of a seamstress and of a butcher who worked his way up to become a vice president of the Waldbaum's supermarket chain. When he was seven years old, the family moved to Marine Park, Brooklyn. He graduated from Stuyvesant High School in 1961. He then graduated from Brooklyn College with a bachelor's degree in 1965, and from St. John's University School of Law with a Juris Doctor in 1968. He later received the Presidential Medal of Distinction from Brooklyn College in 2003, and an honorary LLD from St. John's University School of Law. He was a Republican.

== Career at SEC ==
From 1968 to 1978, Pitt served on the staff of the Securities and Exchange Commission (SEC), eventually becoming the agency's youngest general counsel in 1975 at age 30. He was known for a blunt, mercurial, combative manner. Pitt was later a partner at Fried, Frank, Harris, Shriver & Jacobson, where beginning in 1978 he represented clients such as all of the Big Five accounting firms, the New York Stock Exchange, and "virtually all the exchanges and investment houses." Pitt was later the chairman of the SEC, serving for 18 months between August 2001 and February 2003 (rather than his full five-year term), as he resigned abruptly in November 2002 during a wave of criticism.

During his tenure at the SEC, he was lauded by some for his response to the 9/11 attacks, and for crafting a new rule requiring large company executives to personally certify their company's financial results. However, he was criticized for requesting that his pay be increased and his job as SEC chairman be elevated to Cabinet rank, for being too slow to react to corporate scandals, for meeting privately with his former clients while they were subjects of SEC investigations, for being too close to the accounting industry, and for reversing his commitment to support highly qualified candidate John H. Biggs to head the new Public Company Accounting Oversight Board. The final criticism of him, by both Democrats and Republicans, was that he attempted to appoint as head of the new accounting oversight board 78-year-old William Webster, who chaired the audit committee of a company under SEC investigation for fraud and accounting irregularities, while the company lacked internal controls—without informing the White House or the other SEC Commissioners that Webster was under scrutiny for his involvement in a corporate accounting fraud investigation. In November 2002, Pitt abruptly resigned under pressure as Chairman of the SEC, 15 months into what was to be a five-year term; he stepped down the following February. Harvey Pitt was one of the founding members of the SEC Historical Society in 1999, a non-profit organization that preserves and shares the history of the SEC and financial regulation. Later in his career, Pitt served as a columnist with Compliance Week, and as an expert witness.

=== Accomplishments ===
As the 26th Chairman of the SEC, succeeding Arthur Levitt, Pitt oversaw the SEC's response to the market disruptions resulting from the terrorist attacks of 9/11, for which he was lauded by journalist Stephen Labaton as a "voice of calm." Further, Labaton called Pitt the "architect of the new rule requiring executives of large companies to personally certify their financial results." Pitt created the SEC's "real time enforcement" program—a policy designed to make the SEC's enforcement initiatives more efficient and effective for the protection of investors, and led the SEC's unanimous adoption of dozens of rules implementing the Sarbanes-Oxley Act of 2002.

=== Criticism ===
In July 2002, The New York Times wrote: "Democratic and Republican members of Congress joined administration officials today in ridiculing Harvey L. Pitt's request that his pay be increased and his job as chairman of the Securities and Exchange Commission be elevated to Cabinet rank ... evoking an outpouring of bipartisan scorn." Pitt had tried to insert a provision into corporate antifraud legislation that would increase his pay by 21%, and also elevate his status to that of Cabinet level, on a par with the Secretary of State and Attorney General (and above that of the Director of the CIA), at a time when the stock markets had sunk to five-year lows and some congressional leaders were calling for him to resign. Tom Daschle, the Senate majority leader, who had previously called for Pitt to be dismissed, said: "Of all the things he has to think about, it is amazing to me that this is what he's spending his time thinking about. I think it makes our point, the point many of us had, that he is not qualified to serve in that position." The Wall Street Journal questioned his credibility. Journalist Bill Keller opined in The New York Times: "Harvey Pitt ... must be the most politically tone-deaf man to serve in Washington since Earl Butz, who memorably justified junk-food school lunch programs by declaring that ketchup is a vegetable.... The Democratic National Committee could not have invented Harvey Pitt."

Pitt became the target of criticism when, following his vow to the accounting industry in his first speech as SEC chairman to make the SEC a "kinder and gentler place for accountants," the Enron scandal broke out on his watch, and was accused of being too slow to react to corporate scandals and market turmoil. Democrats alleged that he was too close to the accounting industry, and that he subverted efforts to tighten regulation in the wake of the Enron scandal and other cases of corporate malfeasance. He also raised concerns when he met privately with former clients of his while they were subjects of SEC investigations, and regularly remained in the room for SEC discussions of matters involving his former clients.”

In October 2002 Senate majority leader Daschle and House minority leader Richard A. Gephardt, urged President Bush to replace Pitt. They wrote that Pitt's decision to reverse, after the accounting profession objected, the commitment that he had made one month prior to support highly qualified candidate John H. Biggs (a leading voice for reforming oversight of accountants), to head the new Public Company Accounting Oversight Board.

Later in October 2002, Pitt attempted to appoint as head of the new accounting oversight board 78-year-old William Webster, who chaired the audit committee of a company under SEC investigation for fraud and accounting irregularities, while the company lacked internal controls—without informing the White House or the other SEC Commissioners that Webster was under scrutiny for his involvement in a corporate accounting fraud investigation. After the company's outside auditor raised concerns about the company's financial controls, Webster—as head of the audit committee—had fired the auditor.

When Pitt reacted by saying his own agency would investigate his appointment of Webster, economist Paul Krugman wrote: "Pitt's response ... beats anything a satirist could have imagined." Democratic Senator Paul Sarbanes, Chairman of the U.S. Senate Banking Committee, called for Pitt's resignation, as did Democratic Representative Edward Markey. Republican Senators including Mike Enzi (Wyoming), the only accountant in the Senate, and Richard Shelby (Alabama) joined John McCain in criticizing Pitt. The Chicago Tribune, which had supported him in the past, opined: "whether Pitt is clueless or arrogant doesn't really matter... He has committed a rank deception. He must go." The U.S. Chamber of Commerce withdrew its support of Pitt. A GAO report later criticized Pitt for his lack of diligence in the decision to name Webster to head the accounting oversight board, while also finding that while Pitt was aware of the Webster fraud investigation he was not aware of certain details.

=== Resignation ===
Pitt abruptly resigned from the SEC under pressure after the polls closed on election night, on November 5, 2002, after what The New York Times called "a political firestorm over his selection of the head of a new board overseeing the accounting profession", which led to four investigations of his actions. One week later, Webster resigned as well. The New York Times, in an opinion column, wrote: "His stewardship of the S.E.C... was nothing short of disastrous." The New York Observer in its own opinion column wrote: "Harvey Pitt is either a moron or a scoundrel." CFO Magazine wrote:

Harvey Pitt may be gone, but what he left undone can’t be forgotten. The perpetually embattled chairman of the Securities and Exchange Commission resigned on Election Night after 15 tumultuous months in office. Criticized for being too close to his former Wall Street clients, unable to build consensus, and arrogant to boot, he finally succumbed to criticism over his selection of William Webster to head the Public Company Accounting Oversight Board.

Pitt was just the second SEC Chairman to resign abruptly as a result of political turmoil. Slate magazine wrote: "Of all Pitt’s transgressions, none has been more pathetic than his self-pitying denunciations of 'guilt by occupation.' ... He accepted seedy clients not out of principle, but because he wanted to be a player, and because he wanted the money and publicity such assignments generated." In November 2002 journalist Calvin Trillin wrote a ballad about him, based on Stephen Sondheim's "Demon Barber," that began: "Attend the tale of Harvey Pitt, Who many thought was quite unfit".

When Pitt was asked in 2005 if he believed he could have left the SEC on a better note if he had stayed longer, he replied: "I feel I left on a very high note."

== Later life ==
Pitt was a columnist with Compliance Week.

Pitt also served later in his career as an expert witness. At the time of his unexpected death, he was the chief executive officer of the strategic consulting firm that he had founded, Kalorama Partners, LLC. In 2011, while at Kalorama and testifying in a deposition as an expert witness for securities class action plaintiffs suing Fannie Mae, he refused to answer any more questions and walked out of his deposition, leading to Judge Richard Leon of the U.S. District Court for the District of Columbia dismissing Pitt as an expert witness.

Pitt died on May 30, 2023, at the age of 78.

Government offices
Preceded by Arthur Levitt	Chair of the Securities and Exchange Commission; 2001–2003	Succeeded by William H. Donaldson
