= Guofu Zhou =

American economist

Guofu Zhou is an American economist, currently the Frederick Bierman and James E. Spears Professor of Finance at Olin Business School, Washington University in St. Louis.
