= Colegio Nueva Granada =

Private international school in Bogotá, Colombia

Location
- Carrera 2 Este # 70 - 20; Bogotá, D.C. Colombia; 4.647856°N 74.050621°W

Information
- Type: Private, Bilingual, International
- Established: 1938
- Founders: Fred Dever, Doris de Samper, Irving C. Byington
- Director: Dr. Eric H. Habegger
- Staff: 388
- Faculty: 287
- Grades: K - 12
- Gender: Coeducational
- Enrollment: 1,701
- Average class size: 200
- Language: English, Spanish
- Campus size: 30 hectares
- Yearbook: Andean
- Website: Official Site

Colegio Nueva Granada is a bilingual international private elementary, middle and high school in Bogotá, Colombia.

Colegio Nueva Granada was founded in 1938 by Frederic Dever, Doris de Samper and Irwin C. Byington. Its original name was "The Anglo-American School" and Dr. Gabriel Jinich was its first director.

Colegio Nueva Granada teaches a U.S. college-preparatory curriculum. Students study for both the U.S. High School Diploma and the Colombian Bachillerato Diploma. The majority of the classes are taught in English with a varied curriculum including Foreign Languages (Chinese and French), Sports, and Technology. The school's staff includes foreign as well as Colombian teachers. The AP system is offered to students, allowing them to gain college credits. The CNG student body in August 2020 was made up 1,701 students of 47 nationalities (42% Colombian, 18% dual citizenship (U.S-Colombia), 16% U.S. citizens, 14% dual citizenship (Other-Colombian) and 10% from other countries). Moreover, the total number of employees was 388 (Faculty: 287, Administrative support: 56 and General Services: 45). All CNG teachers are certified professionals

Among social projects in which students participate are the Hogar Nueva Granada, Alianza Educativa and mandatory personal student social service hours. Hogar Nueva Granada and Alianza Educativa are projects formed to help children and families in need with health and education programs to ensure their futures as Colombian citizens.

Yearly, students teach English to approximately 40 children, ages 7 to 14, from the surrounding neighborhoods of Juan XXIII and Bosque Calderón in Bogotá.

Others participate in the continuing education program for adults, 18 to 40 years old. This is a joint program, with Caja de Compensacion Familiar (CAFAM) with the help of teacher and student volunteers, to prepare adults to validate elementary school and also to get ready for ICFES exams in the higher levels of education.

Colegio Nueva Granada is home to the first Confucius Institute established in a K-12 school in Latin America. The institute, founded in October 2009, promotes the study of Chinese language, culture, ethics, and philosophy. Eighteen CNG students have been awarded full scholarships to study in China by the CI since 2009.

== House system ==
Colegio Nueva Granada follows the House system tradition. Throughout elementary and middle school, students and teachers form part of one of the four houses (Falcons, Eagles, Hawks, and Osprey). Houses compete in both academic and athletic tasks, with a winner crowned at the end of the school year based on the overall points the house received. The winning team is awarded a trophy placed in their corresponding school's hallway.

== Tri-Association ==
The school was the host of the Association of American Schools of Central America, Colombia, Mexico, and the Caribbean meeting in the week of October 13, 2006. Around 1000 people from all over the Americas attended the event.

== Athletics ==
The girls' basketball team won the XXII Juegos Binacionales.

== Notable alumni ==
- Ernesto Fajardo, CEO of Alpina
- Dan Crenshaw, U.S. Representative from Texas
- Juan Pablo Raba, Colombian actor
- Catalina Pelaez, professional squash player
- Carolina Gómez, Colombian actress, former Miss Colombia and Miss Universe 1st Runner-Up
- Clara López, former Minister of Labour, acting Mayor of Bogotá.
- Fernando Botero Zea, former Minister of Defense.
- Carolina Barco, former Minister of Foreign Affairs, former Colombia Ambassador to the United States.
