= Thomas Jefferson School (Missouri) =

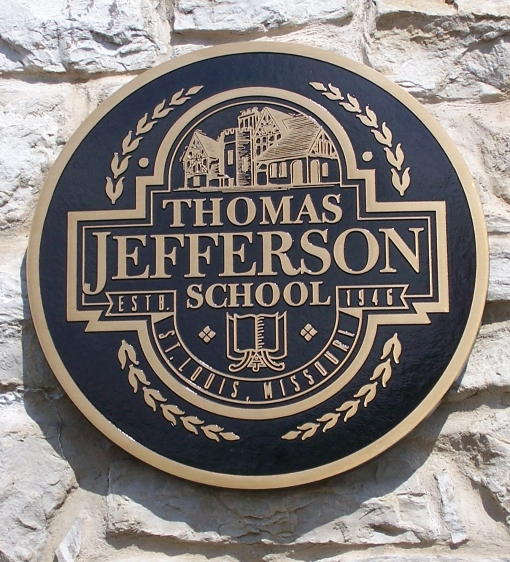

Location
- 4100 S. Lindbergh Blvd; Sunset Hills, Missouri 63127; United States; 38.5391°N 90.3959°W

Information
- Type: Private
- Motto: Greek: ἡ ἀρετή (Arete)
- Established: 1946; 80 years ago
- Head of school: Jane Ballard Roth
- Faculty: 13
- Grades: 7–12
- Enrollment: 74
- Colors: Blue and white
- Athletics: Basketball, Soccer, Volleyball, Tennis, Yoga, Physical Fitness Class
- Athletics conference: MCSAA — Metro Athletic Conference
- Mascot: Titans
- Campus: Suburban
- Website: tjs.org

Thomas Jefferson School (TJ) is a small coeducational boarding and day school located in Sunset Hills, Missouri, a suburb of St. Louis.

== Overview ==
The school is located on 20 acres (8.1 ha) in the middle of St. Louis's South County suburbs. It is small for a school of its kind, with only around 90 students from grades 7 through 12, about a quarter of whom are international students. Boarding students and day students attend in about equal numbers.

TJ is focused on the classics, and the ideal of a classical education in general, balanced by a strong math program (all students continue through calculus) and Advanced Placement courses in science and history for all students. The Greek program, in particular, is among the best in the nation. Classes, all in the morning, are discussion-oriented and relatively short, at 35 minutes. Students spend the remainder of the day studying independently, engaged in athletics and other extracurriculars, or consulting privately with faculty members, some of whom live on campus. Supervisory staff includes seven resident assistants.

As ranked by the Boarding School Review, the median SAT scores of seniors are among the highest in the nation for boarding schools: 710 reading, 670 math, 690 writing. A large share of its alumni go on to attend liberal arts colleges.

The school has long held membership in the National Association of Independent Schools, the Association of Boarding Schools, and Midwest Boarding Schools, and in 1997 it gained full accreditation by the Independent Schools Association of the Central States.

== History ==
Thomas Jefferson Prep School was founded in 1946 by Robin McCoy, Charles E. Merrill Jr. (son of a founder of Merrill Lynch), and Graham Spring. They aimed to create a school whose governance rested with the faculty, patterned after the colleges that comprise Oxford and Cambridge Universities. At one time in its history, teachers with seniority could become board members. In order to comply with new standards of the Independent Schools Association of the Central States, the school is now governed by a non-faculty Board with members drawn from alumni, past parents, and friends of the school.

For its first 25 years, TJ was a boarding and day school for boys in grades 9–12. In the 1950s, it was a feeder school for Harvard. The school became coeducational in 1971. During the 1970s, the school also began admitting students as five-day boarders. The school added an eighth grade in 1976 and a seventh grade in 1981.

== Head of School ==
Robin McCoy, the school's first headmaster, held the job for 34 years; he was replaced by Lawrence Morgan (TJ '53) in the summer of 1980. William C. Rowe (TJ '63) succeeded Morgan as Head of School in July 2000. Elizabeth Holekamp succeeded Rowe as Head of School in July 2011. Matthew Troutman succeeded Holekamp as Head of School in July 2020. The current Head of School is Jane Ballard Roth (TJ '91) who stepped into the role in November 2022.

== Notable alumni ==
- John H. Biggs, former CEO of TIAA-CREF
- Alexandra Grant, artist
- Jeffrey L. Meikle, cultural historian
- Bernat Rosner, author
