= William Shaw (businessman) =

American hotelier (21st century)

William J. Shaw
- Born: Circa. 1946 (age 79–80); United States
- Education: University of Notre Dame (BA); Washington University in St. Louis (MBA)
- Occupations: Hotelier, business executive
- Known for: Senior leader of Marriott International

William Shaw is an American hotelier and business executive who was the vice-chairman of Marriott International until he retired in 2011. He spent most of his career working for Marriott hotels working his way up to the vice-chairman position which he held since May 2009.

== Early life and education ==
Shaw grew up in Arlington County, Virginia. Shaw completed a BA at University of Notre Dame and an MBA at Olin Business School at Washington University in St. Louis in 1972.

== Career ==
He joined the Marriott hotel company in 1974 and progressed up the corporate ladder: elected Corporate Controller in 1979, company Vice President in 1982. Senior Vice President of Finance and Treasurer of Marriott Corporation in 1986, Chief Financial Officer and Executive Vice President of Marriott Corporation in April 1988 and President of the Marriott Service Group in February 1992.

Shaw became the Chairman of the Board for Marriott Vacations Worldwide in November 2011.

Between March 1997 and April 2009, Shaw served as the President and Chief Operating Officer of Marriott International, before taking up his position as Vice-Chairman.

== Other positions ==
Shaw is on the board of trustees of the University of Notre Dame, the Suburban Hospital Foundation, the Wolf Trap Foundation of the Performing Arts, Washington Mutual Investor Fund, board of directors and the NCAA Leadership Advisory Board.
