= Rosalind Kornfeld =

Biochemist

- Born: Rosalind Hauk; 1935
- Died: August 10, 2007
- Education: Washington University in St. Louis; George Washington University
- Scientific career
- Thesis: The purification and properties of uridine diphosphate glucose-glycogen transglucosylase from rabbit muscle (1961)
- Doctoral advisor: David H. Brown

Rosalind Hauk Kornfeld (1935–2007) was a scientist at Washington University in St. Louis known for her research determining the structure and formation of oligosaccharides. The Society for Glycobiology annually awards a lifetime achievement award in her honor.

== Education and career ==
Rosalind Kornfeld née Hauk was born in Dallas, Texas and then grew up in Chevy Chase, Maryland. She earned a bachelor of science degree from George Washington University in 1957. She went on to receive her Ph.D. degree from Washington University in 1961 working on enzymes in rabbit muscles. While pursuing her Ph.D., she would give birth to two children, with her son Kerry growing up to study developmental biology. For a brief period she stayed at George Washington University as a postdoctoral investigator before moving to the National Institutes of Health as a fellow working with Victor Ginsburg. She moved back to St. Louis in 1965 when she accepted a position at Washington University School of Medicine. She started as a research instructor, was promoted to research assistant professor in 1971, and then research associate professor in 1978. In 1981 she was named a professor of medicine and professor of biochemistry and molecular biophysics. Kornfeld retired in 2001.

Kornfeld founded the Academic Women's Network at Washington University and then served as its first president. She also served as president of the Society of Glycobiology in 1993.

== Research ==
Kornfeld's research laid the groundwork for the field of glycobiology with her investigations into nucleotide sugar biosynthesis and glycan ligands for lectins. Korneld's notable accomplishments include defining the structure and function of N-acetylglucosamine-1-phosphodiester alpha-N-acetylglucosaminidase, commonly known as the 'uncovering enzyme' or UCE. She then worked to place that enzyme within the trans Golgi network. Kornfeld wrote two influential reviews on oligosaccharides, the second of which has been cited over 6000 times as of 2021.

== Selected publications ==
- Kornfeld, S.; Kornfeld, R.; Neufeld, E. F.; O'Brien, P. J. (1964-08-01). "The Feedback Control of Sugar Nucleotide Biosynthesis in Liver". Proceedings of the National Academy of Sciences. 52 (2): 371–379. Bibcode:1964PNAS...52..371K. doi:10.1073/pnas.52.2.371. ISSN 0027-8424. PMC 300286. PMID 14206604.
- Kornfeld, R; Kornfeld, S (1976). "Comparative Aspects of Glycoprotein Structure". Annual Review of Biochemistry. 45 (1): 217–238. doi:10.1146/annurev.bi.45.070176.001245. ISSN 0066-4154. PMID 786150.
- Kornfeld, Rosalind; Kornfeld, Stuart (1980). "Structure of Glycoproteins and Their Oligosaccharide Units". In Lennarz, William J. (ed.). The Biochemistry of Glycoproteins and Proteoglycans. Boston, MA: Springer US. ISBN 978-1-4684-1006-8. OCLC 840287599.
- Kornfeld, K.; Reitman, M.L.; Kornfeld, R. (1981). "The carbohydrate-binding specificity of pea and lentil lectins. Fucose is an important determinant". Journal of Biological Chemistry. 256 (13): 6633–6640. doi:10.1016/s0021-9258(19)69037-x. ISSN 0021-9258. PMID 7240233.
- Kornfeld, Rosalind; Kornfeld, Stuart (1985). "Assembly of Asparagine-Linked Oligosaccharides". Annual Review of Biochemistry. 54 (1): 631–664. doi:10.1146/annurev.bi.54.070185.003215. ISSN 0066-4154. PMID 3896128.

== Awards and honors ==
Starting in 2007, the Academic Women's Network at Washington University has awarded the Rosalind Kornfeld Lecture for Distinguished Women in Science. Since 2008, the Society for Glycobiology has awarded the Rosalind Kornfeld Lifetime Achievement Award to honor accomplishments in research within the field. The second edition of Essentials in Glycobiology is dedicated to Rosalind Kornfeld and Roger W. Jeanloz, who are noted as "pioneers in the elucidation of glycan structure and function".

== Personal life ==
Her husband was Stuart Kornfeld whom she met when she was a first year graduate student in biochemistry in 1958. They married in 1959 and worked together for 48 years; during his speech accepting the 2010 George M. Kober medal he acknowledged the key role she played in their joint accomplishments, a situation that has been noted by others. Her son, Kerry Kornfeld, is also a scientist and while he was in high school, they jointly published a paper on lectins.
