= Compliance Week =

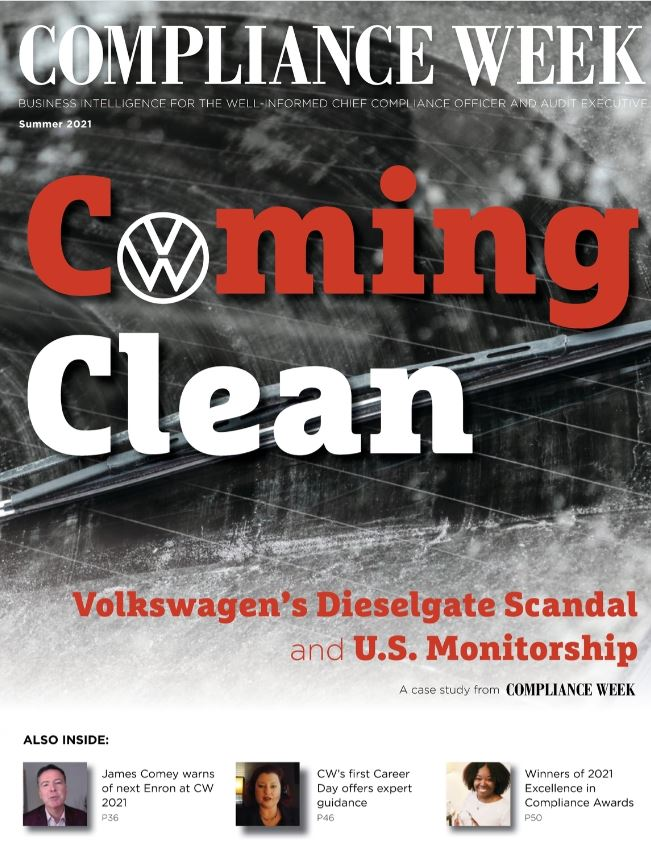
- Editor: Vacant
- Categories: Regulatory compliance, business news, newsletters, webcasts, events, training
- Frequency: Quarterly
- Circulation: 9,000
- Publisher: Verdian Insights
- Founded: 2002
- Country: United States
- Based in: Boston, Massachusetts
- Language: American English
- Website: www.complianceweek.com
- ISSN: 1549-957X

Compliance Week, published by Verdian Insights, is a business intelligence service on corporate governance, risk, and compliance that features daily news and analysis, proprietary databases, industry events, and interactive features and forums. It ceased publishing a quarterly magazine in 2024.

== History ==
Founded in 2002, the organization is based in Boston, Massachusetts.

== Notable columnists ==
- Harvey Pitt (1945-2023)
