= Sopó =

- Municipality and town
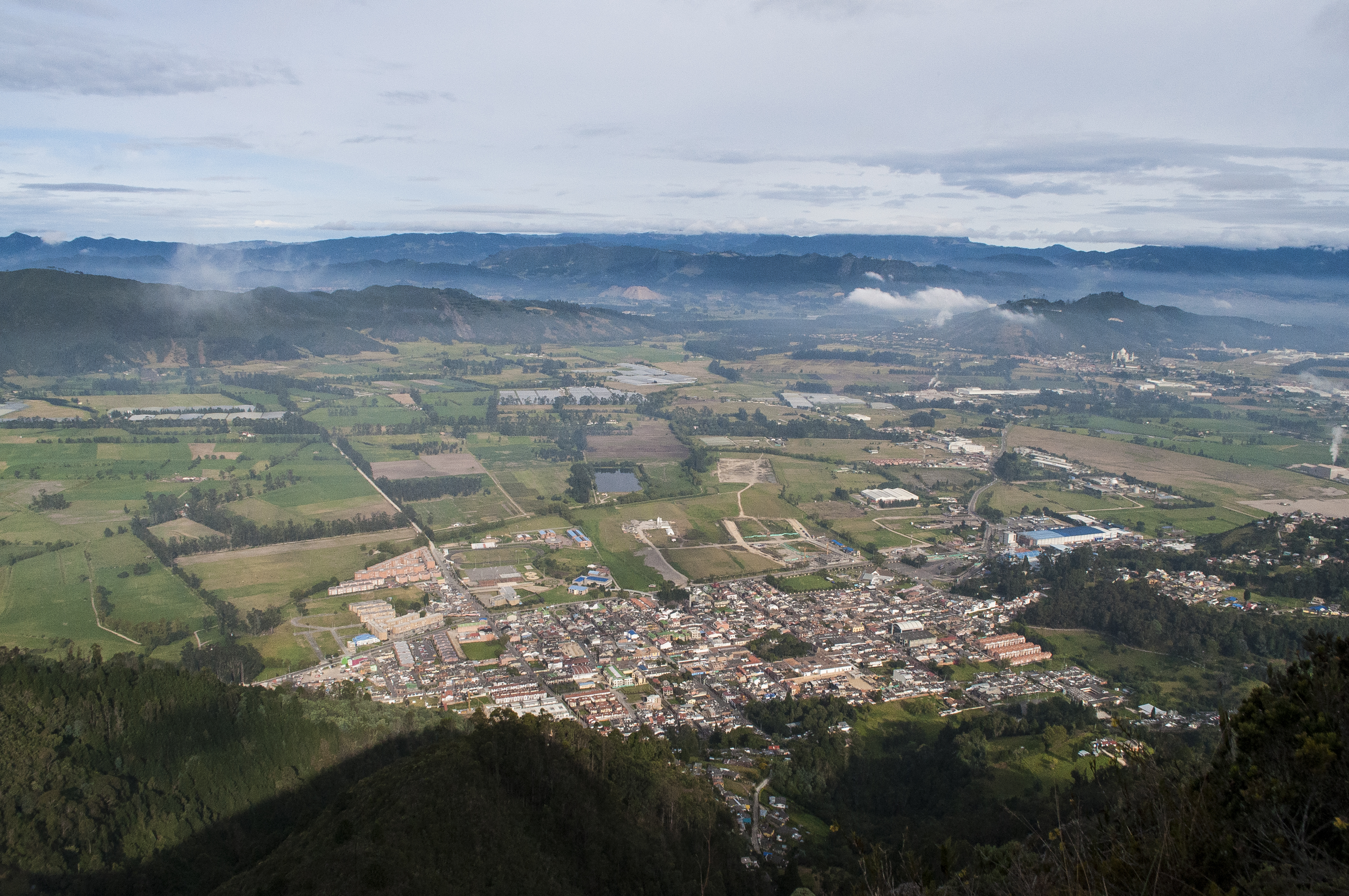
- View of Sopó

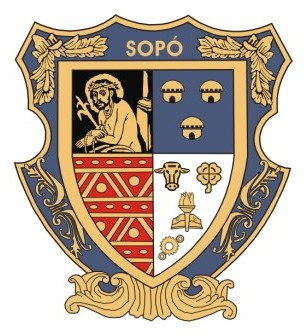
- Flag Coat of arms

- Location of the municipality and town inside Cundinamarca department of Colombia

- Location in Colombia
- Coordinates: 4°55′N 73°56′W
- Country: Colombia
- Department: Cundinamarca
- Province: Central Savanna Province
- Founded: 25 May 1653
- Founder: Friar Francisco Chacón

Government
  - Mayor: Miguel Alejandro Rico Suárez (2020–2024)

Area
  - Municipality and town: 111.1 km^{2} (42.9 sq mi)
  - Urban: 2.61 km^{2} (1.01 sq mi)
- Elevation: 2,650 m (8,690 ft)

Population (2018 census)
  - Municipality and town: 25,287
  - Density: 227.6/km^{2} (589.5/sq mi)
  - Urban: 17,435
  - Urban density: 6,680/km^{2} (17,300/sq mi)
- Demonym: Soposeño/a(s)
- Time zone: UTC-5
- Website: Official website

Sopó is a municipality and town of Colombia in the department of Cundinamarca. The town is located 39 km north of the Colombian capital Bogotá.

== History ==
The area of Sopó was inhabited first by indigenous groups during the Herrera Period and later the Muisca before the arrival of the Spanish in 1537. It was part of the zipazgo ruled from Bacatá.

In the coat of arms of the town in the lower left quadrant a Muisca pattern can be seen.

== Borders ==
- North: Tocancipá and Zipaquirá
- South: La Calera
- East: Guasca
- West: Cajicá and Chía.

== Economy ==
The major economical activity in Sopó is agriculture and especially dairy. The third largest Colombian dairy company Alpina was founded in Sopó in 1945.

== Gallery ==
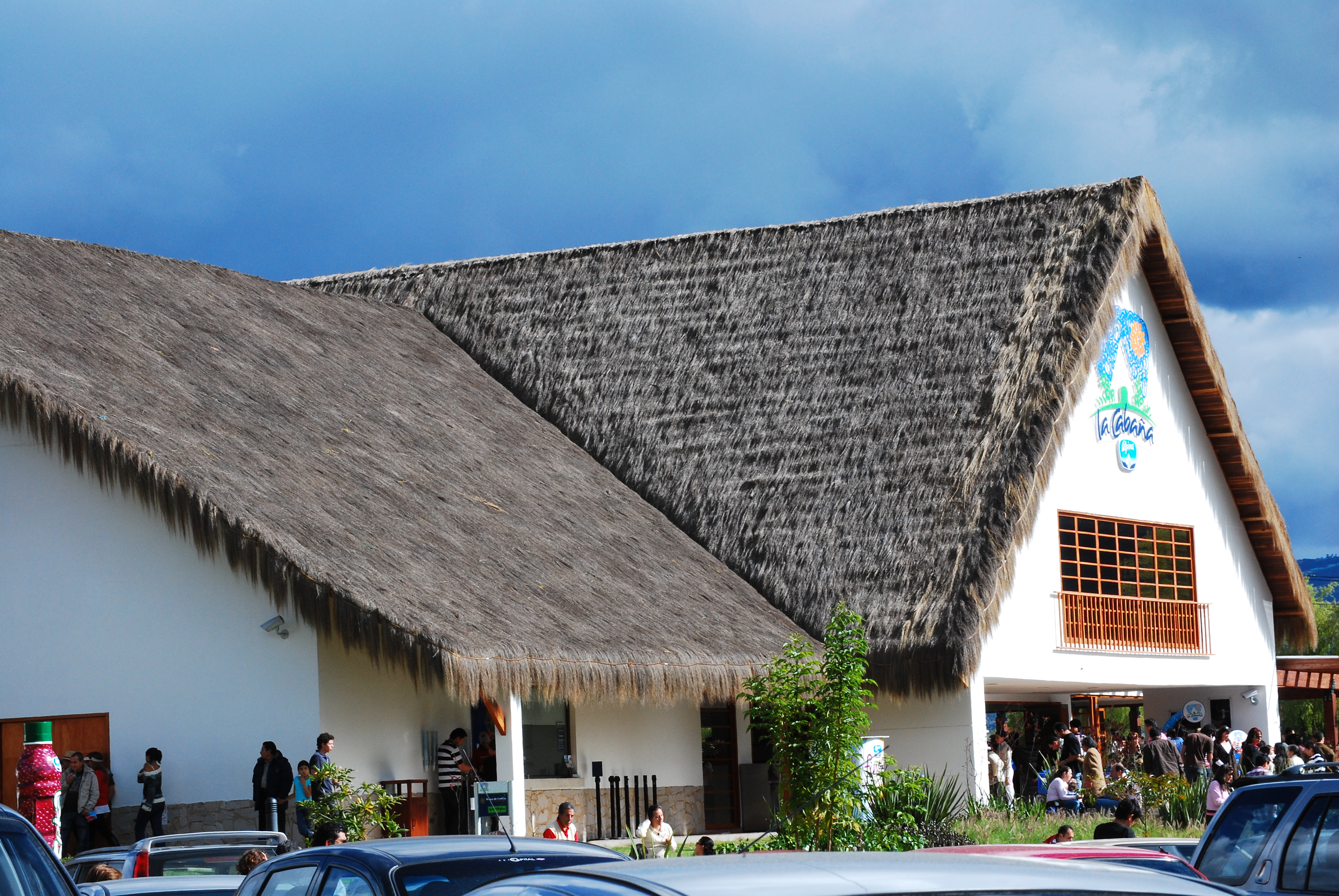
Alpina wholesale

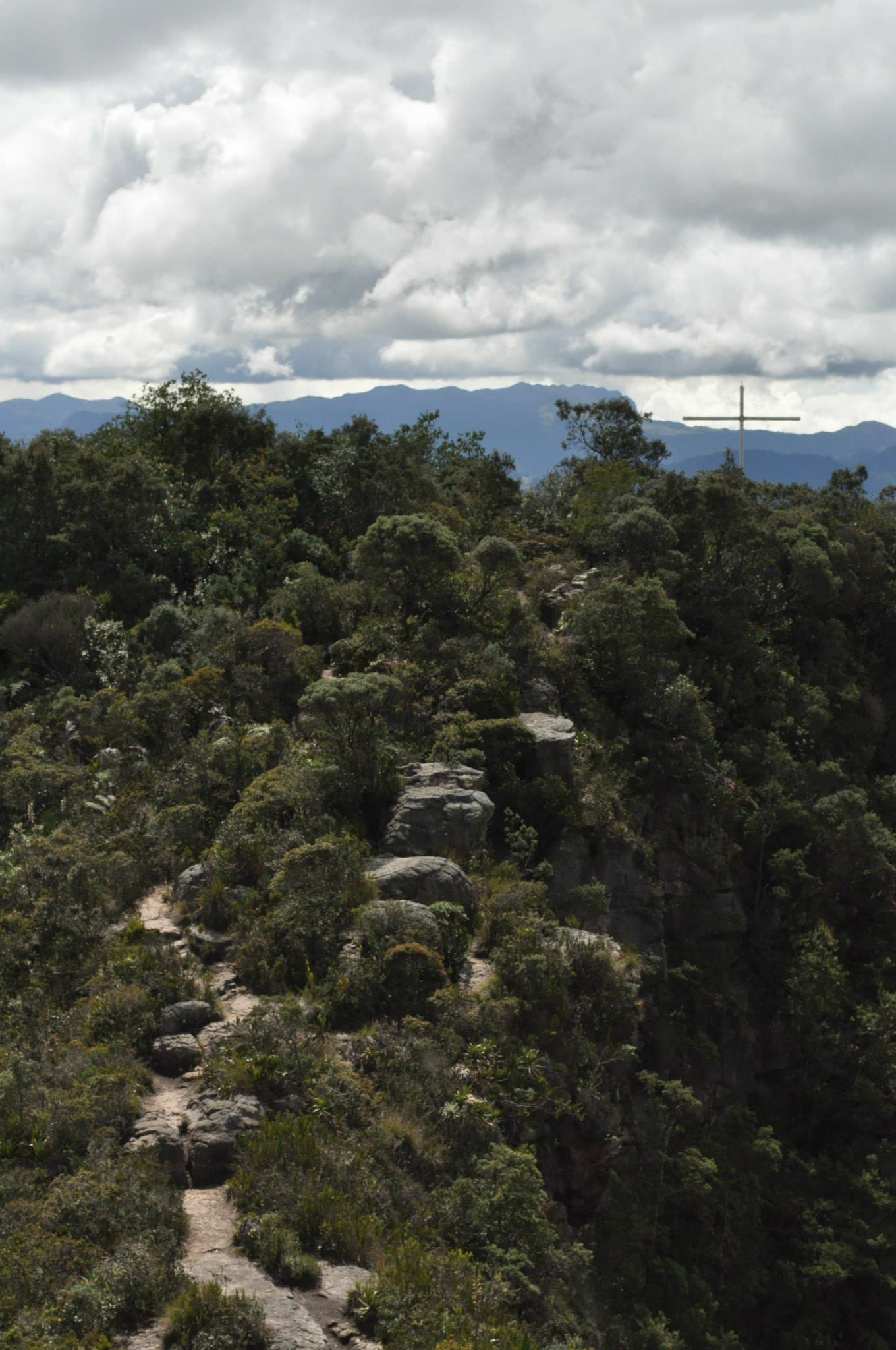
Sendero de la Cruz walking trail

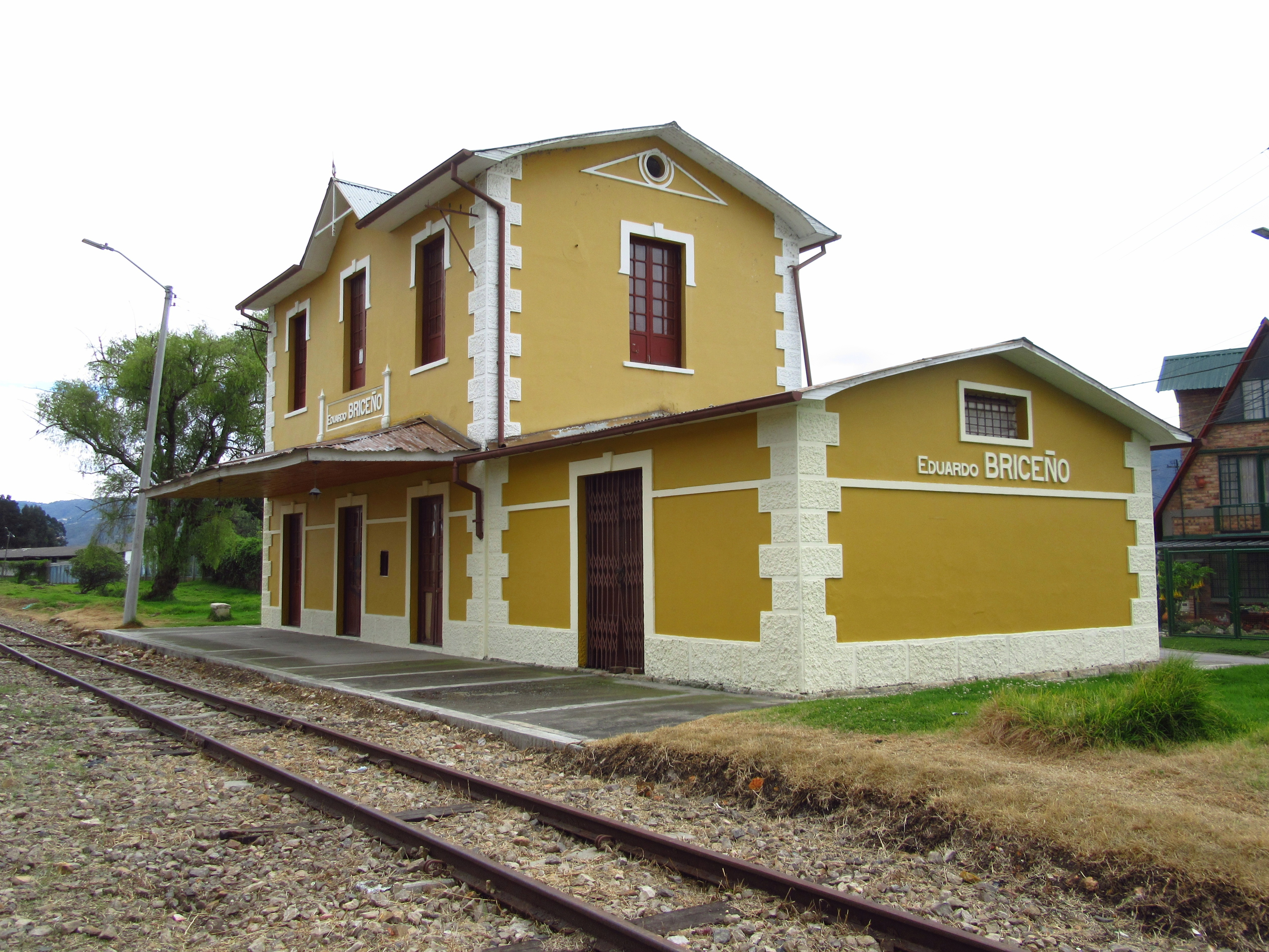
Briceño Train Station

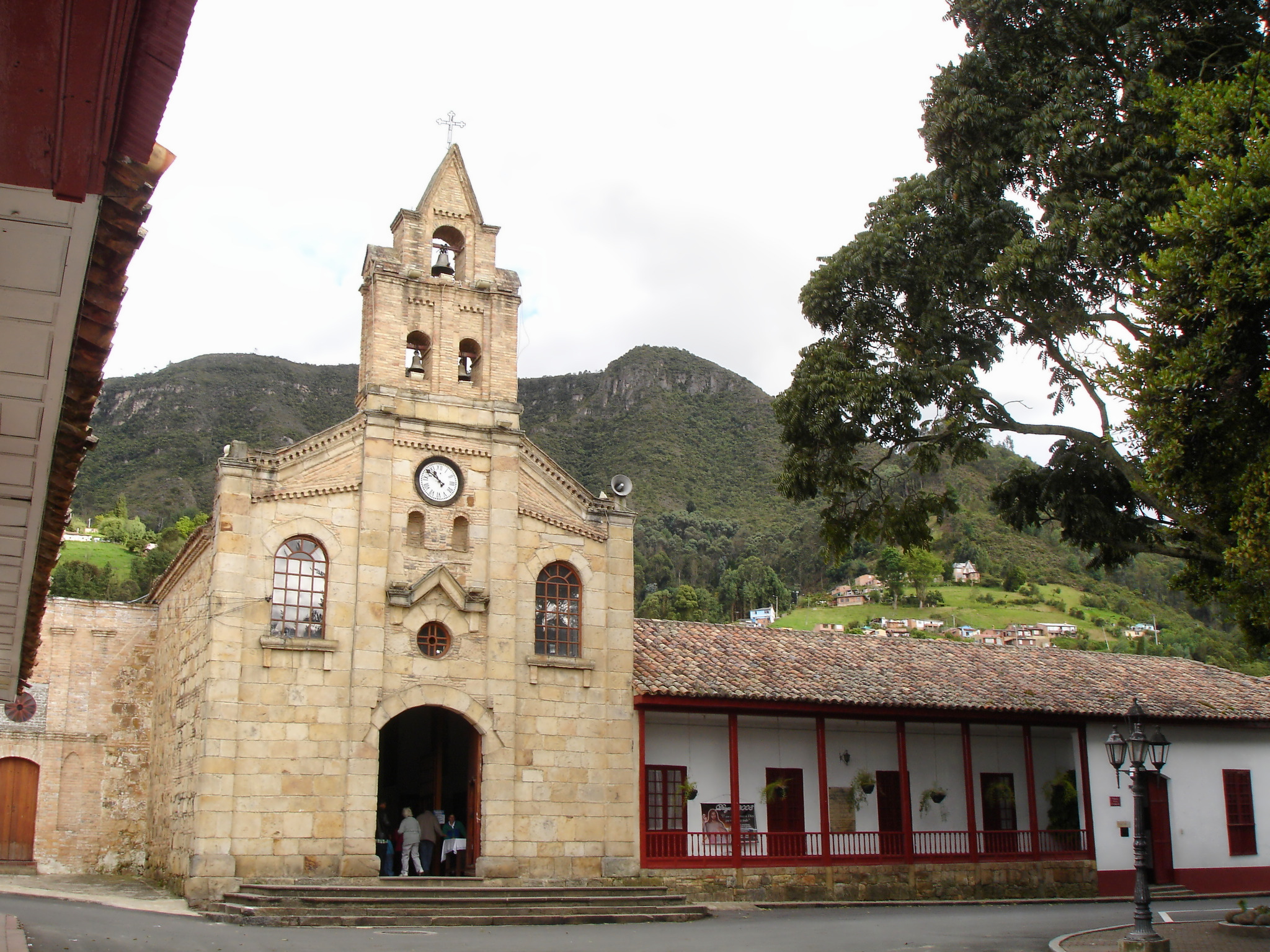
Church and cultural center of Sopó

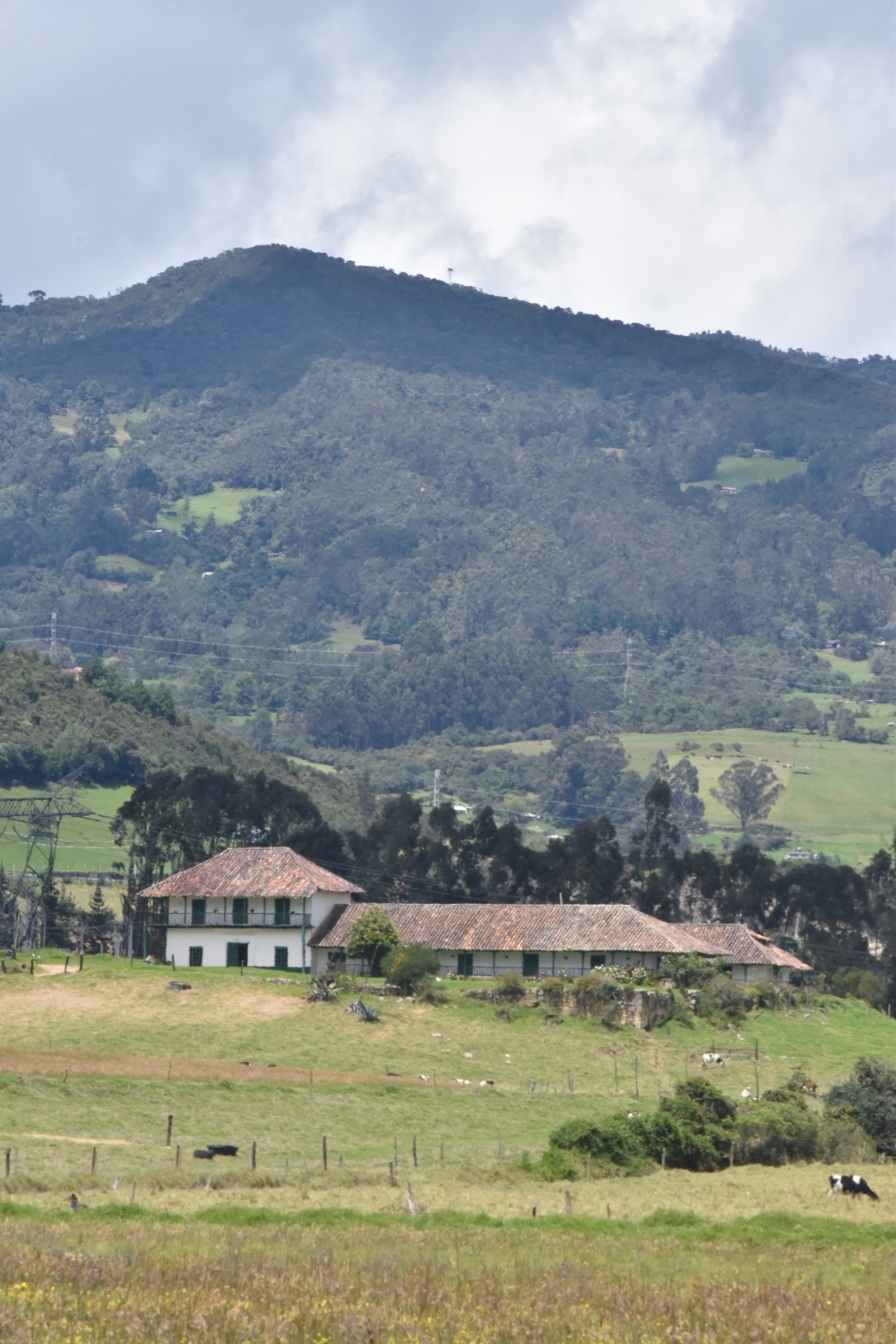
Hacienda Casablanca South

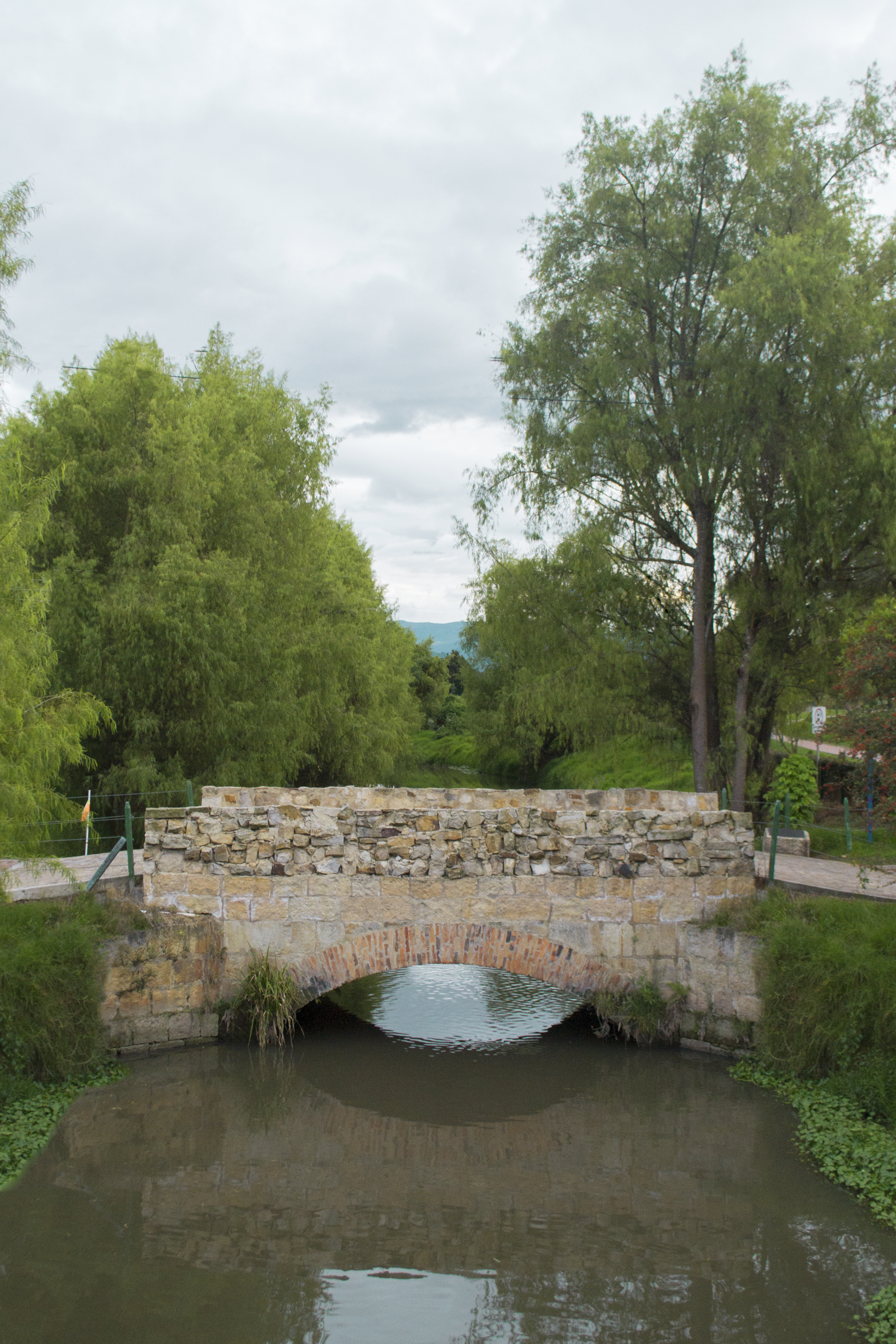
Replica of the bridge built in 1695
