= Gregory Millman =

American freelance financial journalist (born 1951)

Gregory J. Millman (born in St. Louis, Missouri) is a freelance journalist and author of books on financial markets and on homeschooling. Millman graduated in 1975 from the University of Missouri in St. Louis, with a B.A. degree in French. He worked as a factory laborer, then earned an MA (Asian Studies) from Washington University in St. Louis and an MBA from the Olin Business School, and went to Taiwan where he continued studies in Chinese and began to work as a freelance writer for business publications. He returned to the United States in 1981, where he worked in banking, consulting, and project finance before returning to journalism in 1988.

Shortly after an article he wrote for the September 1991 issue of Corporate Finance Magazine cited non-public documents, agents from the U.S. Department of the Treasury showed up at the door of his home demanding that he reveal his source. When Millman refused, the Justice Department issued subpoenas for his telephone records and the records of people he had called.

The investigation extended to include the telephone records of the Alicia Patterson Foundation, which awarded Millman a fellowship for 1992. Foundation chairman Joseph Albright and director Margaret Engel recounted in the Washington Post how the IRS obtained a thirteen-month record of the Foundation's telephone calls – even though neither Millman nor his sources had ever used that telephone. A subsequent conference on telephone privacy at the National Press Club addressed this and similar instances of surveillance of reporters.

In May 1993, Millman testified at Congressional hearings on a draft version of the Telephone Consumer Privacy Protection Act of 1993, sponsored by Representative Edward John "Ed" Markey. which included requirements for notification when telephone records were subpoenaed.

In 1995, the Free Press published Millman's The Vandal’s Crown: How Rebel Currency Traders Overthrew the World’s Central Banks, an investigation of the new financial markets and their power, and it was translated into ten languages. It was published in the United Kingdom under the title Around the World on a Trillion Dollars a Day. In 1999, Times Books published his The Day Traders: the Untold Story of the Extreme Investors and How They Changed Wall Street Forever.

In 2008, Tarcher/Penguin published Homeschooling: A Family’s Journey, a journalistic memoir of homeschooling six children, co-authored by Gregory J. Millman and his wife, Martine Parmer Millman. The book recounts the experience of homeschooling children through elementary and high school, and also puts the experience in context with reporting on contemporary social, economic, and educational issues.

== Bibliography ==
- Homeschooling: A Family's Journey (2008) co-author Martine Millman
- The Day Traders: The Untold Story of the Extreme Investors and How They Changed Wall Street Forever (1999)
- The Vandal's Crown: How Rebel Currency Traders Overthrew the World's Central Banks (published in UK as Around the World on a Trillion Dollars a Day) (1995)
- The Floating Battlefield: Corporate Strategies in the Currency Wars (1990)
- Millman, Gregory J. (2008). "Futures and Options Markets". In David R. Henderson (ed.). Concise Encyclopedia of Economics (2nd ed.). Indianapolis: Library of Economics and Liberty. pp. 207–211. ISBN 978-0865976658. OCLC 237794267.
