= Fahd Al-Rasheed =

Senior Saudi Government Official

His Excellency His Excellency Fahd bin Abdulmohsan Al-Rasheed
- معالي أ. فهد بن عبدالمحسن الرشيد
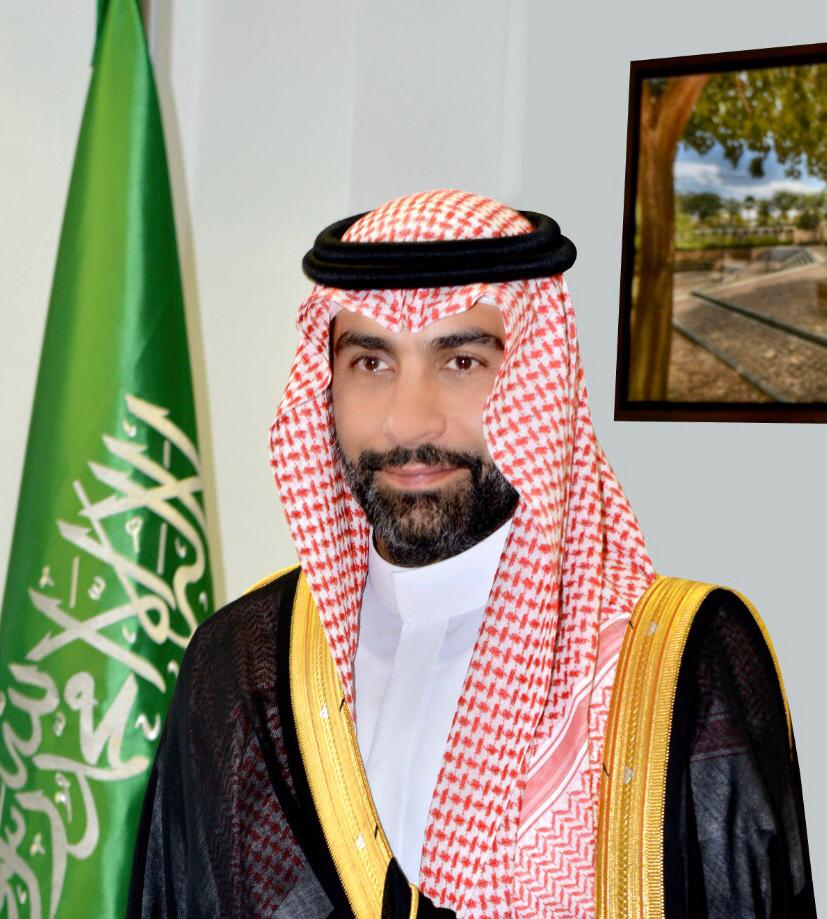
- H.E. Fahd Abdulmohsen Al-Rasheed Advisor in the General Secretariat of the Council of Ministers of the Kingdom of Saudi Arabia
- Incumbent
- Assumed office April 2nd, 2023

Personal details
- Education: (BS) Washington University in St. Louis (MBA) Stanford University
- Awards: “Young Global Leader” by the World Economic Forum in 2011

His Excellency, Fahd bin Abdulmohsan Al-Rasheed (Arabic: معالي أ. فهد بن عبدالمحسن الرشيد) was appointed by Royal Decree as Advisor in the General Secretariat of the Council of Ministers of the Kingdom of Saudi Arabia on April 2, 2023.

== Board memberships ==
Al-Rasheed chairs the Saudi Conventions and Exhibitions General Authority and has represented the Kingdom of Saudi Arabia as a lead on the Urban 20 since 2020. He also serves on the boards of multiple organizations, including: the Royal Commission for Riyadh City, Riyadh Foundation, New Murabba Development Company, Diriyah Company, Qiddiya Investment Company, Hevolution Foundation, King Abdullah University of Science and Technology (KAUST), King Saud University, Expo 2030 Development Company, and Riyadh Art.

== Career ==
Al-Rasheed was previously the CEO of the Royal Commission for Riyadh City (RCRC), the authority responsible for the capital city of the Kingdom of Saudi Arabia, where he oversaw Riyadh’s plans to become one of the world’s leading city economies and a regional hub for investment, tourism, and livability by 2030. During his tenure he led the successful bid for Riyadh to host the World Expo 2030. He stepped down from this role in 2023 to take up the position of advisor to the General Secretariat of the Council of Ministers, at which time we was elevated to the rank of excellency.

Prior to RCRC, Al-Rasheed was the Group CEO and Managing Director of King Abdullah Economic City (KAEC), which is the first publicly listed city in the world and, at the time, one of the largest private sector projects globally. During his tenure at KAEC, Al-Rasheed spearheaded the development of King Abdullah Port, which became one of the world’s 100 largest port facilities.

Before joining KAEC, he was the CFO and Deputy Governor of the Saudi Arabian General Investment Authority (now the Ministry of Investment).

== Urban Leadership Initiatives ==
During the 2024 U20 Summit in Rio de Janeiro, Al-Rasheed contributed a paper on the future of Urban leadership to the official U20 book, Urban Sustainable Development: Governance, Finance and Politics, published by the Brazilian Center for International Relations (CEBRI) in collaboration with the G20. That paper formed the basis for the Master in City Administration (MCA) initiative to create an MBA-equivalent degree program for city leaders. The MCA was jointly announced at the U20 2025 Summit in Johannesburg by the Saudi Arabian delegation and the 2025 co-chairs.

== Education ==
Al-Rasheed holds a Bachelor of Science in Business Administration from the Olin Business School , and an MBA from the Stanford Graduate School of Business. He is also a graduate of the Advanced Management Program in Real Estate at the Harvard Graduate School of Design.
