= Clover Sonoma =

American dairy company

- Type: Subsidiary
- Industry: Dairy
- Founded: 1916; 110 years ago
- Founder: Gene Benedetti
- Headquarters: Petaluma, California, United States
- Area served: California
- Products: Milk, yogurt, ice cream, dairy products
- Parent: Alpina Productos Alimenticios
- Website: cloversonoma.com

Clover Sonoma, formerly Clover Stornetta Farms (and also Clover Organic Farms or simply, Clover), is a dairy company located in Sonoma County, California, along the Pacific coast in Northern California. It is a brand that has existed since the early 1900s, when the Petaluma Cooperative Creamery served the city of Petaluma. In 1977, Clover Stornetta Farms, Inc. was formed from the joining of two separate companies: Stornetta's Dairy and the Petaluma Cooperative Creamery (which distributed Clover-brand dairy products). Clover Sonoma currently has farms in Sonoma County, Marin County, and Mendocino County, California. In 2021, Clover Sonoma launched Clover the Rainbow, a sister dairy brand that makes a line of kids' organic yogurt smoothies.

== History ==
The Petaluma Cooperative Creamery began distributing "Clover" brand dairy products to homes and stores in the city of Petaluma in the early 1900s. Eventually the company started to expand and sold their products throughout Sonoma County and Marin County. The population of both counties grew rapidly and eventually "Clover" brand products were being sold to almost every grocery store in the four counties of the North Bay. In 1975, the largest fire in Petaluma's history occurred, causing some destruction to the dairy cooperative, destroying the processing and bottling line along with the cooler.

In 1977, the owners of Clover bought the wholesale distribution from the co-op after deciding not to rebuild their own co-op facility. Clover also bought the Stornetta Dairy in the city of Sonoma. In 1984, the owners of Clover Stornetta decided to move their company and the whole distribution back to the company's original city of Petaluma. In June 1991, Clover Stornetta opened a new milk processing facility at their current location in Petaluma. (The Stornetta Dairy in Sonoma was Clover's only bottling plant at the time.) The equipment in Sonoma had been antiquated and a large amount of the work had to be done manually. With the new automated plant run by computerized controls, Clover became able to triple the output of the former plant with the same amount of manpower.

Clover Sonoma introduced their "Clover Promise of Excellence" program in 1994 (as the North Coast Excellence Certified program) and a full third-party certification was later added in 1999. 'Clover Promise of Excellence' is a set of criteria each of Clover Sonoma's family farms must adhere to in the areas of animal welfare, environmental stewardship, and milk quality.

In 2016, Clover Sonoma became a Certified B Corporation, committing to performance assessment in five categories: governance, workers, customers, community, and the environment.

In 2017, the company changed its name to Clover Sonoma to honor its Sonoma County heritage. Clover Sonoma's conventional product line packaging had remained unchanged since the 1980s and its organic product packaging was untouched since the early 2000s. The Clover Sonoma brand update included a full packaging redesign across product lines.

In 2020, Clover Sonoma announced its B Corporation recertification and unveiled the first fully renewable plant-based milk carton in the United States as part of its continued focus on sustainability.

In December 2021, 70% of the shares of Clover Sonoma is acquired by Colombian dairy product company Alpina Productos Alimenticios.

== Clo the Cow ==
In 1969, Clo the Cow made her debut as the Clover Stornetta mascot when she started appearing on billboards across the Redwood Empire. Well known for her puns, Clo's likeness continues to appear in Clover Sonoma traditional, digital, and social media advertising, and on Clover the Rainbow packaging.

== Community ==
As part of Clover Cares community giveback program, the company gives at least five percent of profits every year to charitable organizations that fit within its mission of elevating dairy, empowering future generations, and supporting the community. Programs supported through Clover Cares include pandemic fundraising for Petaluma Valley hospital, a kids cooking challenge, education grants, and agricultural education.

== Farms ==
All 30 Clover Sonoma dairy farms are family-owned. Clover Sonoma was the first dairy in the U.S. to become American Humane Certified, requiring adherence to rigorous quality standards.

== Sustainability ==
Clover Sonoma's CEO, Marcus Benedetti, has led the company's focus on sustainability. Clover Sonoma dairies recycle 100% of their manure production, either using it on the farm as fertilizer or other capacities, or providing it to local organic farms. They perform rotational grazing to protect soils, crop vigor, and biodiversity. They recycle fresh water from milk plate coolers, and divert it to the animal drinking water system. Pastures are seeded annually, adjusting the blend of grasses to maintain diversity and high soil quality.

Clover Sonoma's packaging decisions have evolved with sustainability in mind over the years. They started reducing plastic waste by saying "no" to plastic caps on paper cartons, preventing more than 227,000 pounds of plastic from entering landfills in 2019. With its Organic DHA Omega-3 + Choline Milk line, Clover Sonoma took their commitment a step further by partnering with 1% for the Planet to donate a portion of proceeds of the sale of the product to the non-profit Plastic Pollution Coalition. Clover Sonoma was the first dairy in the U.S. to switch to a fully renewable plant-based milk carton. The company converted more than 10 million cartons in 2020, and have pledged to convert their entire line of milk cartons to fully renewable over the next few years.
