= Bernat Rosner =

American lawyer and concentration camp survivor (1932–2026)

Bernat Rosner (29 January 1932 – 27 February 2026) was a Hungarian-born American lawyer and Holocaust survivor of the Auschwitz and Mauthausen-Gusen concentration camps. As the only survivor of his family he emigrated to the United States of America in 1948 and became a U.S. citizen in 1953.

== Biography ==
Bernat Rosner was born on 29 January 1932 in Tab, Hungary, to an Haredi Jewish family. In 1944, he and his family were deported to Auschwitz-Birkenau. Later he was transferred to Mauthausen. He was the only member of his family to survive the concentration camps.

The story of Bernat Rosner is told in the book An uncommon friendship (2001) written by Bernat Rosner and Frederic C. Tubach. Tubach has the same age as Rosner, but was the son of a Nazi military officer. After they became friends in California, they decided to publish the story of their youth and their friendship.

He went to high school at Thomas Jefferson School in St. Louis, Missouri and graduated in 1950 before attending Cornell University (1954) and Harvard Law School (1959). Before retiring in 1994, he was General Counsel of Safeway, Inc. (1984–1993), Vice Chair of the Antitrust Section of the American Bar Association (1990–91), the author of several articles, and a frequent lecturer on the Robinson Patman Act.

Rosner died in Spring Hill, Tennessee, on 27 February 2026, at the age of 94.

== Sources ==
- Harvard Law School alumni records, Safeway Inc. 1992 Annual Report
