= Barbara A. Schaal =

German biologist

Barbara Anna Schaal
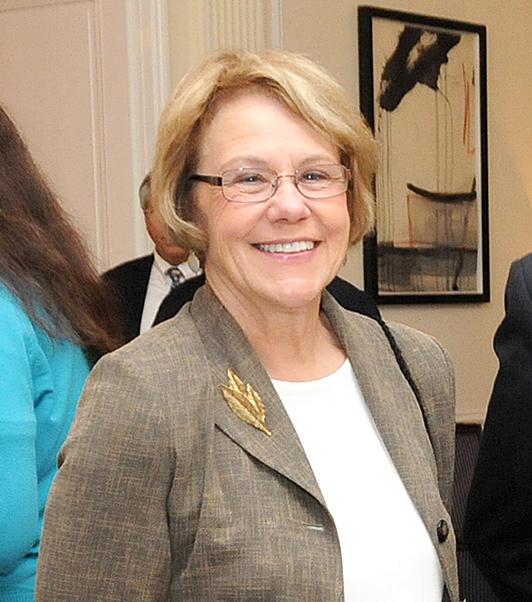
- Born: 1947 (age 78–79); Berlin, Germany
- Citizenship: United States
- Education: Yale University, University of Illinois, Chicago
- Scientific career
- Workplaces: Washington University in St. Louis
- Doctoral advisor: Donald Levin
- Website: www.biology.wustl.edu/faculty/schaal/

Barbara Anna Schaal (born 1947 in Berlin, Germany, naturalized in 1956) is a German-born American professor, scientist, and evolutionary biologist at Washington University in St. Louis and served as vice president of the National Academy of Sciences from 2005 to 2013. She is the first woman to be elected vice president of the academy. From 2009 to 2017, Schaal served on the President's Council of Advisors on Science and Technology (PCAST).

== Education ==
Schaal grew up in Chicago, graduated from the University of Illinois, Chicago with a degree in biology, and received a doctorate from Yale University in 1974.

== Area of expertise ==
Schaal is best known for her work on the genetics of plant species. She is known particularly well for her studies that use molecular genetic data to understand evolutionary processes such as gene flow, geographical differentiation, and the domestication of crop species.

== Career ==
Schaal was on the faculty of the University of Houston and Ohio State University before joining Washington University in 1980, where she has served as chair of the biology department. In 2009, Schaal was named the Mary-Dell Chilton Distinguished Professor in Arts & Sciences at Washington University. She was formerly the director of Tyson Research Center and has been president of the Botanical Society of America and president of the Society for the Study of Evolution.

Schaal served as Washington University's dean of Arts & Sciences from January 1, 2013, through the 2019–20 academic year. In 2015 Schaal was elected as president of the American Association for the Advancement of Science and assumed the position in 2016. In her president's address at AAAS' 2017 annual meeting, held Feb. 16–20 in Boston, titled 'Science and Technology for the Public Good,' she discussed the value of science and told the audience of scientists, students, journalists and science communicators that 'it is our obligation as scientists and citizens to speak up for science ... be a force for science.

Schaal established both the Distinguished Teaching Award and the Faculty Leadership Award in 2014 as a way to recognize exceptional commitment to Arts & Sciences and its students.

In 2023, Schaal was elected as a member of the American Philosophical Society.
