= Vania Vargas =

Guatemalan poet, writer and cultural journalist

- Born: 12 January 1978 (age 48); Quetzaltenango, Guatemala
- Education: Universidad de San Carlos de Guatemala
- Occupations: Poet, writer, narrator

Vania Vargas (born 12 January 1978 in Quetzaltenango, Guatemala) is a Guatemalan poet, narrator, editor, and journalist. Her writings specialize in Guatemalan culture.

Her mother, a primary school teacher, assisted Vargas in graduating from school with scholarships financed by private interests and by friends. Vargas took an interest in books early in life because of her uncle's interest and his large library of police and medieval fantasy novels, which would be the first books she read in her life. For this reason, Vargas decided to study literature, but her parents would not allow her to move to Guatemala City to study literature.

Vargas's first work as a journalist came with local newspaper El Nuevo Quetzalteco, later shortened to El Quetzalteco, which covered red notes and tribunes, an experience that gave her much needed journalistic experience. In 2002, Vargas finally moved to the capital to study literature, graduating in 2009 from the Universidad de San Carlos de Guatemala. Her first novel, Cuentos infantiles, published by Catafixia Editorial, was part of the La malla collection, which included books by Maurice Echeverría, Yaxquin Melchi, and René Morales Hernández.
