= Missouri Christian School Athletic Association =

- Abbreviation: MCSAA
- Formation: 1995
- Type: Volunteer
- Purpose: Athletic/Educational
- Headquarters: Joplin, Missouri
- Location: Missouri, Kansas, Illinois
- Members: 38
- Website: mocsaa.com

The Missouri Christian School Athletic Association (MCSAA) is the sports governing body for independent Christian schools in Missouri, Illinois, and Kansas.

== History ==
The Missouri Christian School Athletic Association (MCSAA) was established in 1995 "to provide a comprehensive state-wide competitive program of athletics in a Christian environment." MCSAA currently has 38 member schools. Danny McCubbin is the executive director.

== Athletics ==
The MCSAA sanctions the following sports:

- Baseball
- Boys/Girls Basketball
- Boys/Girls Cross Country
- Cheer
- Boys/Girls Golf
- Boys/Girls Soccer
- Boys/Girls Track and Field
- Girls Volleyball

== Tournaments ==
The organization conducts three seasons of sports tournaments for its 38 current member schools:

=== Fall Tournaments ===
- Boys Cross Country
- Girls Cross Country
- Boys Soccer
- Girls Volleyball

=== Winter Tournaments ===
- Boys Basketball
- Girls Basketball
- Cheer

=== Spring Tournaments ===
- Baseball
- Girls Soccer
- Boys Golf
- Girls Golf
- Boys Track and field
- Girls Track and field

All tournaments take place in Joplin, Missouri. The tournament history dates to 1995.

== Member Schools ==
- Aurora Christian Academy - Aurora, Missouri
- Berean Christian Academy - Monett, Missouri
- Bethel Academy - Grandview, Missouri
- Blue Ridge Christian School - Kansas City, Missouri
- Center Place Restoration School - Independence, Missouri
- Christian Academy of Greater St. Louis - St. Louis, Missouri
- Christian Learning Center - Fort Scott, Kansas
- Christian Ministries Academy - Billings, Missouri
- Clinton Christian Academy - Clinton, Missouri
- Community Christian Academy - Barnhart, Missouri
- Crosspoint Christian School - Villa Ridge, Missouri
- The Daniel Academy - Kansas City, Missouri
- Eagle Ridge Christian School - Cape Girardeau, Missouri
- El Dorado Christian School - El Dorado Springs, Missouri
- Fort Scott Christian Heights - Fort Scott, Kansas
- Harrisonville Classical Christian Academy - Harrisonville, Missouri
- Heartland Christian Academy - Bethel, Missouri
- Heartland Christian School - Belton, Missouri
- Heritage Classical Christian Academy - Fenton, Missouri
- Legacy Academy - Branson, Missouri
- Liberty Christian Academy - Wright City, Missouri
- Lighthouse Christian Academy - Seneca, Missouri
- Lighthouse Preparatory Academy - Jefferson City, Missouri
- Maranatha Baptist Academy - St. Robert, Missouri
- Maryville Christian School - Maryville, Illinois
- North County Christian School - Florissant, Missouri
- Oakwood Academy - Aurora, Missouri
- Outreach Christian Education - Kansas City, Missouri
- Overland Christian School - Overland Park, Kansas
- Ozarks Christian Academy - West Plains, Missouri
- Plaza Heights Christian Academy - Blue Springs, Missouri
- Providence Classical Christian Academy - St. Louis, Missouri
- Rivers of Life Christian School - Granite City, Illinois
- Round Grove Christian Academy - Miller, Missouri
- Show-Me Christian School - La Monte, Missouri
- Tower Grove Christian Academy - St. Louis, Missouri
- The Training Center - Garden City, Missouri
- Trinity Christian Academy - Hollister, Missouri
- Victory Christian Academy - Arnold, Missouri
- Victory Road Christian Academy - Anderson, Missouri
- Westwood Baptist Academy - Poplar Bluff, Missouri
