= Roch Guérin =

French computer scientist

Roch Guérin is a French computer scientist. He is the Harold B. & Adelaide G. Welge Professor of Computer Science at the McKelvey School of Engineering at Washington University in St. Louis, and chair of the Computer Science & Engineering department at that university. Prior to that he was the Alfred Fitler Moore Professor of Telecommunications Networks and professor of electrical and systems engineering and computer and information science at the University of Pennsylvania. He worked for 12 years at the IBM Thomas J. Watson Research Center.

Obtaining his BS from École nationale supérieure des telecommunications, he received his MS in 1984 and PhD in 1986 from the California Institute of Technology.

His research centers on computer networks, cloud computing, performance analysis, and network economics. He is a Fellow of the ACM and IEEE for contributions to the theory and practice of quality-of-service guarantees in packet networks, and the development and application of the equivalent bandwidth concept.

== Selected research ==
- Yavatkar, Raj, Dimitrios Pendarakis, and Roch Guerin. "A framework for policy-based admission control." (2000).
- Apostolopoulos, George, et al. QoS routing mechanisms and OSPF extensions. Vol. 999. RFC 2676, August, 1999.
- Guerin, Roch A., and Ariel Orda. "QoS routing in networks with inaccurate information: theory and algorithms." IEEE/ACM transactions on Networking 7.3 (1999): 350-364.
- Guerin, Roch, Hamid Ahmadi, and Mahmoud Naghshineh. "Equivalent capacity and its application to bandwidth allocation in high-speed networks." IEEE Journal on selected areas in communications 9.7 (1991): 968-981.
