= W. Patrick McGinnis =

William Patrick "Pat" McGinnis (November 29, 1947 – March 5, 2024) was the former CEO of Nestlé Purina PetCare Company (formerly Ralston Purina Company), serving in that position from 2001 to 2015; and non-executive chairman of the board from January 2015 to January 2017. McGinnis died peacefully at his home on Anna Maria Island, Florida, on March 5, 2024, he was 76 years old.

== Personal life ==
W. Patrick McGinnis was born and raised in St. Louis, Missouri, to Margaret (nee Cisne) and William McGinnis. William McGinnis was the Chief of OB/GYN at St. Luke’s Hospital in St. Louis. Patrick McGinnis considered either a career in medicine or business while in high school. He attended the University of Denver, where he earned a B.A. in political science and economics. He then received a Master of Business Administration in marketing from the Olin Business School at Washington University in St. Louis in 1972.

McGinnis had two sons, who are both businessmen.

== Nestlé Purina career ==
McGinnis had an over 42-year career with Purina. He joined the company immediately after completing his MBA through its corporate management training program. At Purina, he moved through various management roles, finally becoming the president and CEO:

- From 1997 to 1999, McGinnis served as co-chief executive officer and co-president of Ralston Purina Company and president and chief executive officer of its Pet Products Group.
- From 1999 to 2001, McGinnis served as the chief executive officer and president of Ralston Purina Company. He also served as a director of the company from 1997 to 2001.
- From 2001 to January 1, 2015, McGinnis served as CEO and president of Nestlé Purina PetCare Company.
- From January 1, 2015, to January 2017, he served as non-executive chairman of Nestle Purina PetCare Company.

== Other business and community roles ==
- Independent director of Brown Shoe Co. Inc. (now Caleres, Inc.) since 1999.
- Independent director at Energizer Holdings, Inc. since July 1, 2015.
- Independent director at Edgewell Personal Care Company (formerly Energizer Holdings, Inc.), 2002 through June 30, 2015.
- Trustee of Washington University in St. Louis.

Note: A professorship in the Olin Business School — The W. Patrick McGinnis Professor of Marketing — was established as a result of a gift to the school from McGinnis.
