= Stuart Kornfeld =

American professor of medicine (1936–2025)

Stuart Arthur Kornfeld (October 4, 1936 – August 17, 2025) was an American professor of medicine at Washington University in St. Louis and researcher in glycobiology.

== Early life and education ==
Kornfeld was born in St. Louis on October 4, 1936, to Ruth and Max Kornfeld. He graduated from Ladue Horton Watkins High School in 1954. He received his A.B. in 1958 from Dartmouth College and his MD in 1962 from Washington University School of Medicine. In 1959, he married Rosalind Hauk, a PhD student at Washington University.

== Career ==
After medical school, Kornfeld did an internship at Barnes Hospital in St. Louis, and spent 2 years (1963–1965) as a research associate at the National Institute of Arthritis and Metabolic Diseases of the National Institutes of Health. He then returned to Washington University where he has remained since, serving as the school's hematology division head for thirty years. He and his wife Rosalind, with whom he collaborated scientifically, were recruited to the faculty in 1966 alongside Phil Majerus by the University's Chairman of Medicine. Kornfeld was first an instructor of medicine, was promoted to assistant professor, and eventually professor in 1972. From 1991 to 1997, he served as the director of the Medical Scientist Training Program.

== Death ==
Kornfeld died on August 17, 2025, at the age of 89.

== Awards ==
- 1972 – Elected to the American Society for Clinical Investigation
- 1976 – Elected to the Association of American Physicians
- 1982 – Elected to the National Academy of Sciences
- 1983 – Elected to the Institute of Medicine
- 1984 – Elected to the American Academy of Arts and Sciences
- 1987 – Elected to the Finnish Society of Sciences and Letters
- 1992 – E. Donnall Thomas Prize, American Society of Hematology (inaugural recipient)
- 1999 – Karl Meyer Award, Society for Glycobiology
- 2010 – E. B. Wilson Medal, American Society for Cell Biology (with James Rothman and Randy Schekman)
- 2010 – Kober Medal, Association of American Physicians
- 2012 – Herbert Tabor/Journal of Biological Chemistry Lectureship, American Society for Biochemistry and Molecular Biology
