= Ernesto Fajardo =

Colombian business executive

- Born: Atlanta, Georgia
- Education: Universidad del Rosario; Washington University in St. Louis
- Occupation: Businessman

Ernesto Fajardo is a Colombian business executive, who is the CEO of Alpina.

== Early life ==
Fajardo was born in Bogota, Colombia where he attended Colegio Nueva Granada. He received a bachelor's degree in business administration from the Universidad del Rosario, and an M.B.A. from Washington University in St. Louis.

== Career ==
Fajardo worked for the Monsanto Company between 1999 and 2009 during which he took on several different positions. From September 1999 to July 2004 he was general manager for the Andean Region and Latin America, and was subsequently elected vice-president where he worked until August 2009. After retiring from his role as Monsanto's vice-president, he was president of Inversiones Mundial S.A. from September 2009 to December 2012. Fajardo is the CEO of the Alpina Company.
