= Alpina Productos Alimenticios =

Colombian dairy, food and beverage company

Alpina Productos Alimenticios S.A. BIC
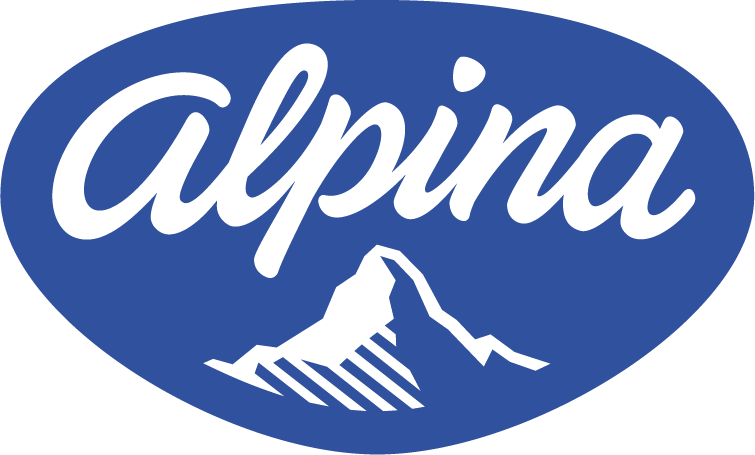

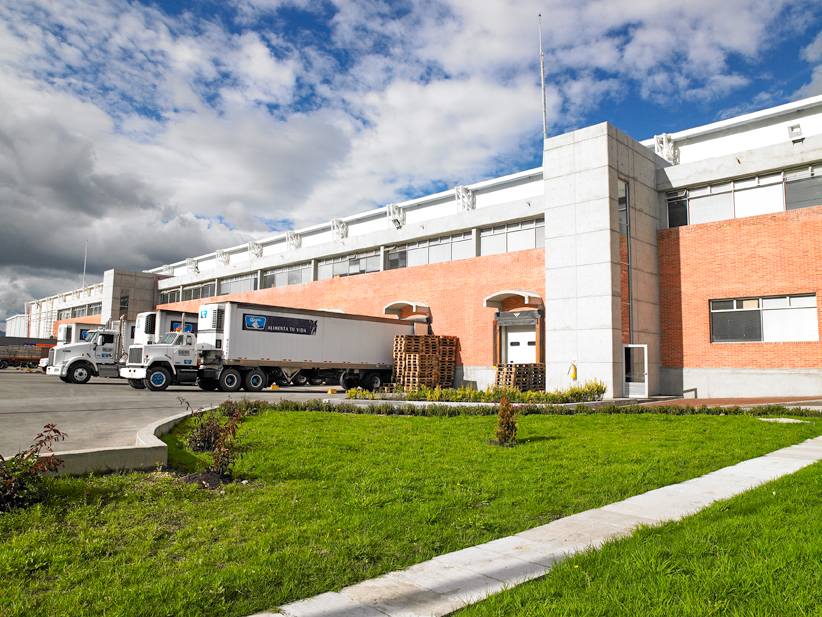
- Company type: Benefit corporation
- Industry: Food processing, Dairy
- Founded: Sopó, Colombia (1945)
- Founder: Walter Goggel & Max Bazinger
- Headquarters: Sopó, Cundinamarca, Colombia
- Area served: Colombia; United States
- Key people: Ernesto Fajardo (CEO)
- Products: Baby food, Dairy Products, Beverages, Milk, Desserts, Cheese
- Number of employees: 6,500 (2009)
- Website: Alpina

Alpina Productos Alimenticios S.A. BIC is a Colombian dairy, food, and beverage company that operates in Colombia and the United States. Its products include beverages, milk, baby food, desserts, cheeses, cream and butter, and finesse products. The company was founded in 1945 and is based in Bogotá, Colombia. The company is the third largest dairy producing company in Colombia with sales over US$700 million and with operations in Colombia, Ecuador and Venezuela.

== History ==
In 1945, Max Bazinger and Walter Goggel, two Swiss men arrived in Colombia with the idea of creating a company.

They began searching for areas with rich milk collection and when they encountered Sopó valley, they were fascinated by its similarity to the Swiss landscape. At the time, they bought 500 bottles of milk and with them, they manually produced their dairy products.

After obtaining a bank loan, they acquired 11 acres of land to build their first factory.

In December 2021, Alpina acquired 70% of Clover Sonoma.

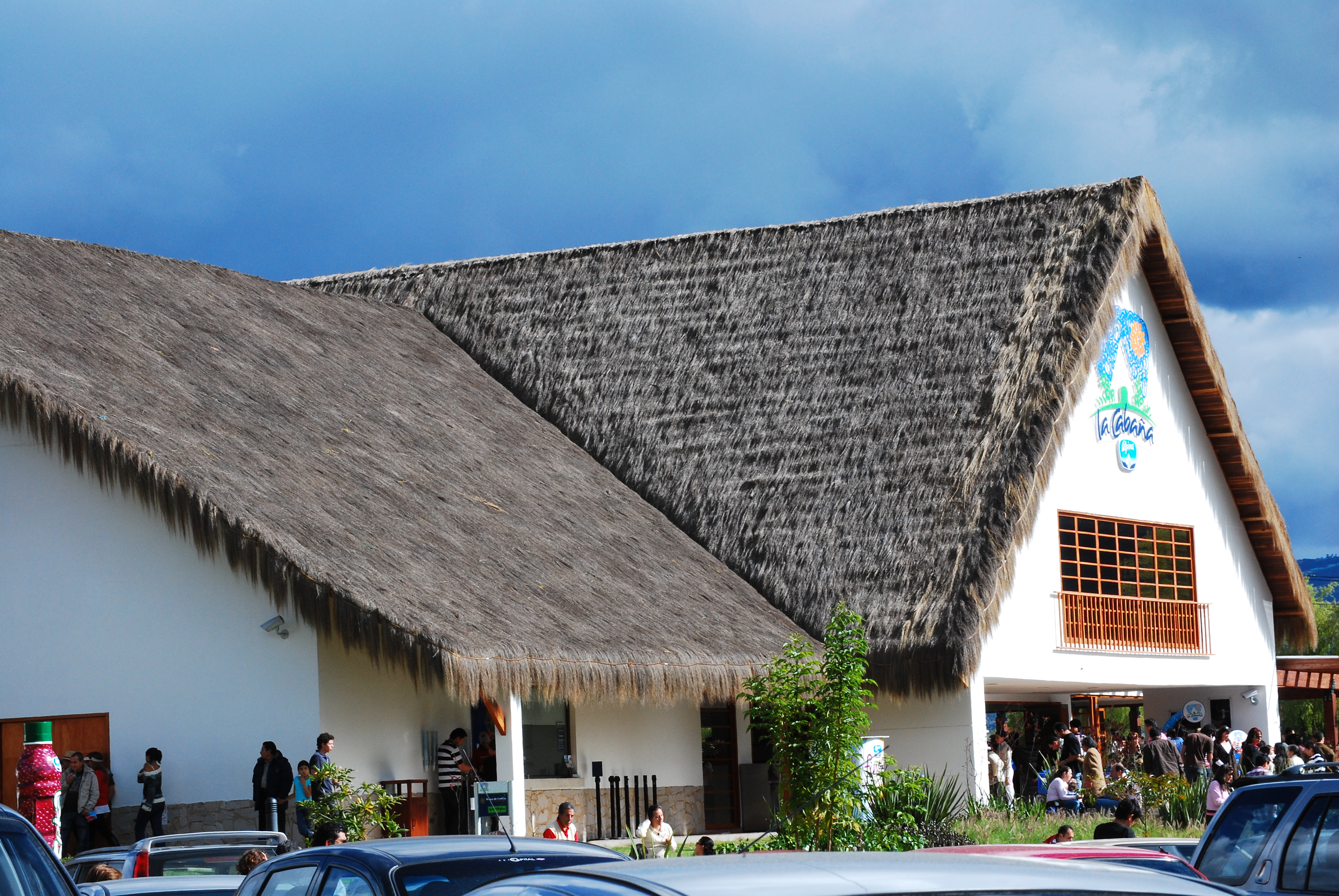
Cabaña Alpina is Located next to Alpina's main Plant

== See also ==
- Hugo Goeggel
