= John H. Biggs =

American business executive

- Born: July 19, 1936 (age 89)
- Education: B.A degree in classics from Harvard University and Ph.D. in economics from Washington University in St. Louis
- Occupation: Former director of The Boeing Company

John H. Biggs (born July 19, 1936) is a former director of Boeing from their 1997 merger with McDonnell Douglas until May 2011, and the National Bureau of Economic Research as well as a trustee of Washington University in St. Louis. He was previously chairman and chief executive officer of financial services company TIAA-CREF from January 1993 until November 2002.

== Education ==
A native of St. Louis, an alumnus of Thomas Jefferson School, Biggs earned a Bachelor of Arts degree in classics from Harvard College, and a Ph.D. in economics from Arts and Sciences at Washington University in St. Louis.

== Career ==
Biggs began his professional career with the General American Life Insurance Company in 1958. He served in various actuarial management positions, and in 1970 was appointed vice president and controller. In 1977, Mr. Biggs became vice chancellor for Administration and Finance from Washington University in St. Louis. He was named president and CEO of Centerre Trust Company, St. Louis, in 1985.

From 1989 to 1993 he served as president and chief operating officer for TIAA-CREF, and became CEO in January 1993.

Biggs was a director of the Boeing Company and JPMorgan Chase, chairman of the J. Paul Getty Trust, and a trustee of Washington University, The Danforth Foundation in St. Louis, and the Santa Fe Opera. He is a former director and chairman of the United Way of New York City and the National Bureau of Economic Research. He was a member of the American Academy of Arts and Sciences, and the Council on Foreign Relations. He was treasurer of the New York City Investment Fund. He was a fellow of the Society of Actuaries. He was chairman of the trustees of the Getty Trust and is Executive-in-Residence at New York University Stern School of Business.

Biggs has published a number of papers on corporate governance, variable annuities, Social Security, regulation and taxation of pension plans, and demographic effects on pensions.
