= Stony Brook Assembly =

Evangelical organization

Guests of the Stony Brook Assembly in front of Hopkins Hall, 1915

The Stony Brook Assembly was an evangelical organization that held a series of annual summer Bible Conferences and camp meetings in Stony Brook, NY on Long Island from 1909 to 1958. Nationally and internationally known speakers led conferences covering topics on religious, educational, and social reform. The assembly was also the parent organization which founded The Stony Brook School to use its grounds outside of the summer months. Though the assembly dissolved, the school still remains today.

== History ==
Beginning in the late nineteenth century, a number of summer religious retreats and camp meetings were founded following the tradition of the Keswick movement in England and the Chautauqua movement in the United States. Other notable conferences were founded at such places as Chautauqua, NY, Winona Lake, IN, and Northfield, MA, grew in popularity as places of physical rest, entertainment, and spiritual renewal.

Rev. John F. Carson on the boardwalk of Atlantic City, c. 1911

In 1906 a prominent group of predominantly Presbyterian ministers and laymen united to establish a summer Bible conference enterprise in the tri-state area of New York, New Jersey, and Connecticut. The group was led by the Pastor of the Central Presbyterian Church in Brooklyn, NY, the Rev. Dr. John Fleming Carson. Among the handful of sites considered for the endeavor were southern New Jersey and the Poconos, but in 1907, after having visited the north shore of Long Island, Carson settled on the hamlet of Stony Brook. Land was acquired directly across from the Stony Brook branch of the Long Island Rail Road. This allowed easy transportation for the approximately ten million people living in the New York metropolitan area, fifty-five miles away. The nearby Stony Brook harbor could also accommodate sailboats carrying guests from Connecticut and other parts of New England across the Long Island Sound. The first meeting began on July 3, 1909, in a large tent pitched on the lawn of Carson's home on Christian Avenue. Despite the stormy weather, which tore the tent, the conferences were an immediate success. Though the first conference had 707 registered guests, 3,869 people in all were in attendance. By the next summer, an auditorium accommodating 1,000 people was erected on the assembly grounds. At the time it was the largest building on Long Island. Today the auditorium is known as Carson Auditorium.

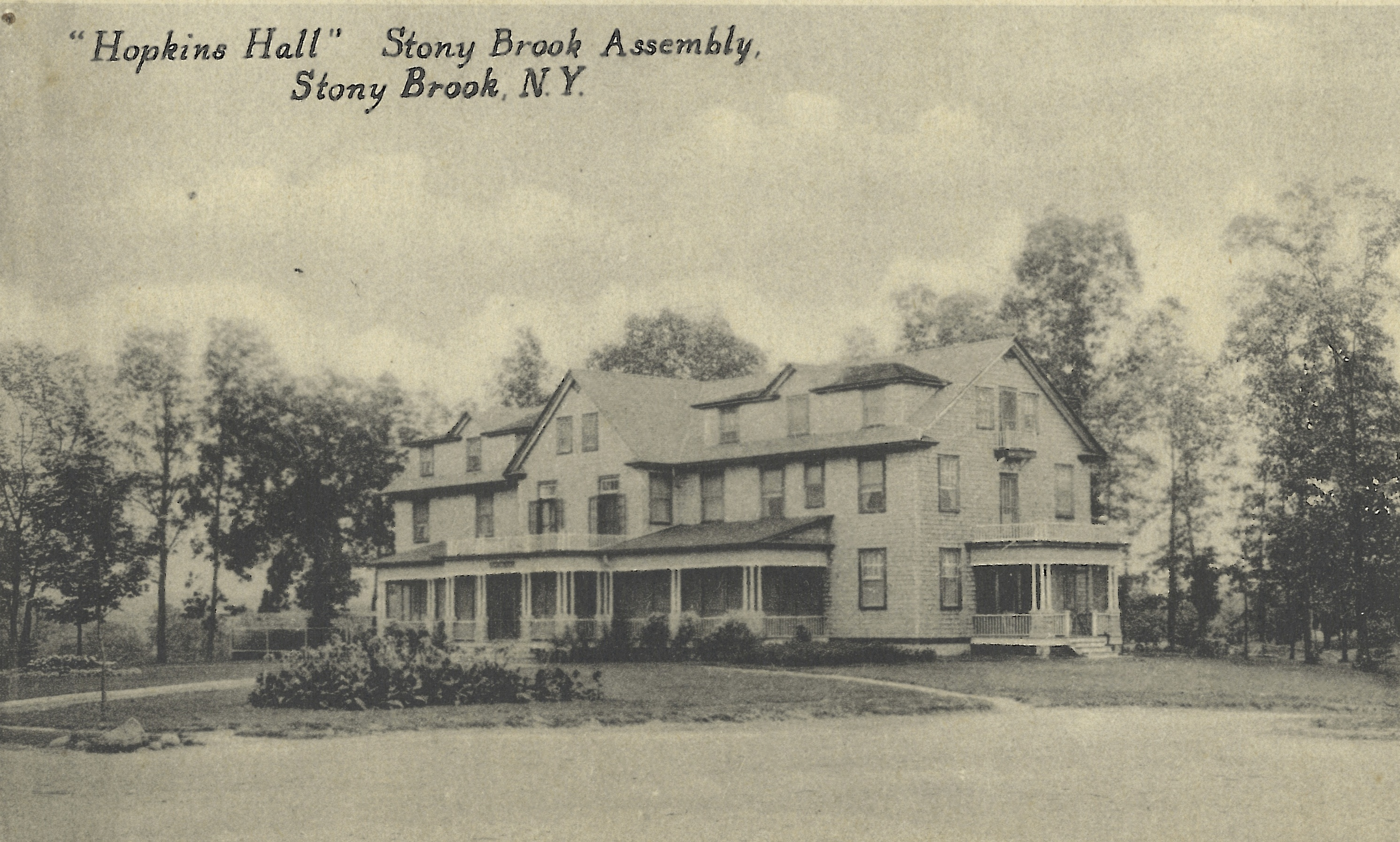
Hopkins Hall c. 1918

In April 1914, the Assembly was incorporated by the State of New York with the Platform of Principles included in its certificate and bylaws.

In 1915, New York philanthropist Ferdinand T. Hopkins funded the erection of a hotel for conference guests on the assembly grounds. Hopkins Hall stood until it was demolished in 1980.

In 1918, Robert Johnston, vice-president of Scruggs, Vandervoort and Barney department store in St. Louis, Missouri, erected another hotel adjacent to the auditorium.

Johnston Hall

In September 1922, the Directors of the Assembly opened The Stony Brook School for Boys as part of their mission to further Christian scholarship at the secondary level. Frank E. Gaebelein, a recent graduate of Harvard's master's program and the son of perennial conference speaker Arno C. Gaebelein, was chosen as the first headmaster. The Assembly oversaw the governance of the school until the Assembly's dissolution.

Following Billy Graham's 1957 crusade at Madison Square Garden, Frank E. Gaebelein, who chaired the crusade committee, invited Graham to the campus for a follow-up event that September. Many fundamentalist conference-goers objected to Graham's presence on campus because of his broadly ecumenical relationship with other branches of Christianity, including Catholics. That summer, the conferences were suspended and the Assembly was later dissolved. The Stony Brook School retained the property and was rechartered separately from its incorporation under the Assembly.

== Purpose ==
The purpose of the founders of the assembly was to establish a center of religious and educational work in harmony with the Platform of Principles.

In advertising the Assembly in the magazine The Caledonian in March 1909, John Carson explained the reasons why the endeavor of founding the Assembly was undertaken:

"The association has been organized for the purpose of establishing a summer resort to be conducted on lines similar to those of other religious and educational associations, where present-day topics and problems in the religious, educational and civic world will be presented and discussed by the masters of each department. Long Island resorts have been known purely as pleasure resorts with no religious features connected with them except at a small camp meeting of Jamesport. There has been no concerted movement for the establishment of a resort of this kind within easy reach of New York city in the past; and keeping that idea prominently before their minds the members of the assembly came to the conclusion that in what might be called the metropolitan district there are 8,000,000 people, many of whom are going to distant places to find such privileges, felt that the time had arrived to lay the foundations of and establish such a work as it is proposed to do at Stony Brook."

Carson continued explaining the broader purpose of the conferences in addition to their religious focus:

"Ocean Grove puts emphasis distinctly on its camp meetings; the services at Stony Brook, it is projected, shall be on a much larger and broader platform. The proceedings at Northfield and Winona are distinctly spiritual in character and each limited to fifteen days. The Stony Brook program embraces most of the summer and includes the consideration of social questions, political questions in their moral aspects, and educational as well as religious problems, which with the various conferences planned will fully take up the months of July and August."

— John F. Carson

== Platform of Principles ==
Central to the Assembly were a set of seven core doctrinal principles upon which all speakers and directors agreed to adhere. The Platform was drafted at the residence of John F. Carson.

- I. The deity of our Lord Jesus Christ.
- II. The need and efficacy of the sacrifice of the Lord Jesus Christ for the redemption of the world.
- III. The presence and power of the Holy Spirit in the work of redemption.
- IV. The divine institution and mission of the Church.
- V. The divine inspiration, integrity and authority of the Bible
- VI. The broad and binding obligation resting upon the Church for the evangelization of the world.
- VII. The consummation of the Kingdom in the appearing of the glory of the great God and our Saviour Jesus Christ.

== Types of Conferences ==
Conferences typically offered each summer addressed various topics and constituencies, which included:

- I. General Bible Conference
  General Bible Conference Aug. 1918
- II. Summer School for Theological Students and Ministers
- III. Conference for Sunday School Workers
- IV. Conference for the study of Prophecy
- V. Evangelistic Conference and Fellowship
- VI. Conference for Students
- VII. An Open Congress
- VIII. Conference for Young People
- IX. Social and Economic Conference
- X. Conference for Public School Teachers

== Founders of the Assembly ==
Listed are those who contributed toward the Assembly and were recognized as its founders.

=== Ministers ===
Contributing $100

- Rev. George Alexander - University Place Presbyterian Church, New York, NY
- Rev. Maitland Alexander - First Presbyterian Church, Pittsburgh, PA
- Rev. Elmer Allen Bess - Presbyterian Church, Clinton, IA
- Rev. Henry Alford Boggs - Princeton Presbyterian Church, Philadelphia, PA
- Rev. Harry L. Bowlby - First Presbyterian Church, Altoona, PA
- Rev. Marcus A. Brownson – Tenth Presbyterian Church, Philadelphia, PA
- Rev. Thomas W. Campbell – Richmond Hill, NY
- Rev. Frank M. Carson – First Presbyterian Church, Greenwich, CT
- Rev. J. F. Carson – Central Presbyterian Church, Brooklyn, NY
- Rev. Robert H. Carson – Grace Presbyterian Church, Brooklyn, NY
- Rev. John Lyon Caughey – Harlem Presbyterian Church, New York, NY
- Rev. J. Wilbur Chapman – Jamaica Estates, NY
- Rev. Joseph W. Cochran – Secretary, Board of Education, Philadelphia, PA
- Rev. Nathaniel W. Conkling – New York, NY
- Rev. Campbell Coyle – Bellefield Presbyterian Church, Pittsburgh, PA
- Rev. Henry C. Cronin – Second Presbyterian Church, Jersey City, NJ
- Rev. John R. Davies – Bethlehem Presbyterian Church, Philadelphia, PA
- Rev. Reid S. Dickson – Presbyterian Church, New Providence, NJ
- Rev. William Ray Dobyns – First Presbyterian Church, St. Joseph, MO
- Rev. C. T. Edwards – Bay Ridge Presbyterian Church, Brooklyn, NY
- Rev. William T. Elsing – New York, NY
- Rev. Charles R. Erdman – Professor, Princeton Theological Seminary, Princeton, NJ
- Rev. William Hiram Foulkes – Rutgers Presbyterian Church, New York, NY
- Rev. James E. Garvin – Herron Avenue Presbyterian Church, Pittsburgh, PA
- Rev. John M. Gaston – Secretary, Freedmen’s Board, Pittsburgh, PA
- Rev. Willis L. Gelston – Supt., Young People’s Work, Board Publication, and S. S. Work, Philadelphia, PA
- Rev. C. P. Goodson – Jamaica Estates, NY
- Rev. Harris H. Gregg – Washington and Compton Ave. Presbyterian Church, St. Joseph, MO
- Rev. A. W. Halsey – Secretary, Board of Foreign Missions, New York, NY
- Rev. Alexander Henry – Secretary, Board Publication and School Work, Philadelphia, PA
- Rev. Frederick W. Hirriett - President, Centre College, Danville, KY
- Rev. William A. Holliday - Plainville, NJ
- Rev. Robert Hunter – Union-Tabernacle Presbyterian Church, Philadelphia, PA
- Rev. W. H. Hubbard – Executive Secretary, Executive Commission, Auburn, NY
- Rev. Robert Scott Inglis – Third Presbyterian Church, Philadelphia, PA
- Rev. C. A. R. Janvier – Hollond Memorial Church, Philadelphia, PA
- Rev. Howard Agnew Johnston – First Presbyterian Church, Stamford, CT
- Rev. Richard T. Jones – Susquehanna Ave. Presbyterian Church, Philadelphia, PA
- Rev. Henry E. Jones – J. A. Henry Memorial Presbyterian Church, Philadelphia, PA
- Rev. George Gibson Kerr – First Presbyterian Church, Cannonsburg, PA
- Rev. John H. Kerr – Arlington Avenue Presbyterian Church, Brooklyn, NY
- Rev. Martin D. Kneeland – Moderator, Synod of New York, Boston, MA
- Rev. Washington R. Laird – First Presbyterian Church, West Chester, PA
- Rev. James W. Laughlin – First Presbyterian Church, Janesville, WI
- Rev. E. Trumbull Lee – First Presbyterian Church, Wilkinsburg, PA
- Rev. J. Beveridge Lee – St. Paul’s Presbyterian Church, Philadelphia, PA
- Rev. H. D. Lindsay – President, Pennsylvania College for Women, Pittsburgh PA
- Rev. John E. Lloyd – Flatbush Dutch Reformed Church, Brooklyn, NY
- Rev. Frederick W. Loetscher – Professor, Princeton Theological Seminary, Princeton, NJ
- Rev. Davis W. Lusk – Supt., Presbytery’s Church Extension Committee, Newark, NJ
- Rev. J. K. McClurkin – Shady Side United Presbyterian Church, Pittsburgh, PA
- Rev. Robert H. McCready – Ridgewood, NJ
- Rev. Thomas A. McCurdy – First Presbyterian Church, Mandan, ND
- Rev. William L. McEwan – Third Presbyterian Church, Pittsburgh, PA
- Rev. D. J. McMillan – Secretary, Board of Church Erection, New York, NY
- Rev. Robert Mackenzie – Secretary, College Board, New York, NY
- Rev. Harlan G. Mendenhall – West 23rd St. Presbyterian Church, New York, NY
- Rev. John A. Marquis – President, Coe College, Cedar Rapids, IA
- Rev. Mark A. Matthews – Moderator General Assembly Presbyterian Church, Seattle, WA
- Rev. Louis Meyer – Editor The Fundamentals, Cincinnati, OH
- Rev. J. R. J. Milligan – First Presbyterian Church, Pontiac, MI
- Rev. Henry C. Minton – First Presbyterian Church, Trenton, NJ
- Rev. James D. Moffat – President, Washington and Jefferson College, Washington, PA
- Rev. Thomas Needham – Collingswood, NJ
- Rev. Ford C. Ottman – Stamford, CT
- Rev. S. S. Palmer – Broad St. Presbyterian Church, Columbus, OH
- Rev. John F. Patterson – Central Presbyterian Church, Orange, NJ
- Rev. Francis L. Patton – President, Princeton Theological Seminary, Princeton, NJ
- Rev. Wilson Phraner – East Orange, NJ
- Rev. Wallace Radcliffe – New York Avenue Presbyterian Church, Washington, D.C.
- Rev. Charles Lee Reynolds – Second Presbyterian Church, Lexington, KY
- Rev. William Henry Roberts – Stated Clerk, General Assembly, Philadelphia, PA
- Rev. John Robertson – Minneapolis, MN
- Rev. Frederick F. Shannon – Brooklyn, NY
- Rev. John Balcom Shaw – Second Presbyterian Church, Chicago, IL
- Rev. Arthur J. Smith – New York, NY
- Rev. Frank W. Snead – East Liberty Presbyterian Church, Pittsburgh, PA
- Rev. James H. Snowden – Professor, Western Theological Seminary, Pittsburgh, PA
- Rev. Cornelius M. Steffens – President, German Presbyterian Theological Seminary, Dubuque, IA
- Rev. J. Ross Stevenson – Brown Memorial Presbyterian Church, Baltimore, MD
- Rev. William P. Stevenson – First Presbyterian Church, Yonkers, NY
- Rev. D. C. Stewart – First Reformed Church, Hackensack, NJ
- Rev. William P. Swartz – New York, NY
- Rev. Ethelbert D. Warfield – President, Lafayette College, Easton, PA
- Rev. Robert Watson – Covenant Presbyterian Church, Cincinnati, OH
- Rev. Thomas Walters – Tabernacle Presbyterian Church, Pittsburgh, PA
- Rev. Acquilla Webb, Warren Memorial Presbyterian Church, Louisville, KY
- Rev. Newell Woolsey Wells – South Third Street Presbyterian Church, Brooklyn, NY
- Rev. E. Van Dyke Wight – Westminster Presbyterian Church, Middletown, NY
- Rev. John T. Wilds – Seventh Presbyterian Church, New York, NY
- Rev. Robert Dick Wilson - Professor, Princeton Theological Seminary, Princeton, NJ
- Rev. James A. Worden – Supt., S. S. Training Board of Publication and Sunday School Work, Philadelphia, PA
- Rev. Edgar Whitaker Work – Fourth Presbyterian Church, New York, NY
- Rev. David G. Wylie – Scotch Presbyterian Church, New York, NY
- Rev. S. Edward Young – Bedford Presbyterian Church, Brooklyn, NY

=== Laymen ===
Contributing $100–$2,500

- Mr. George Arnold, Paterson, NJ
- Mr. J. P. Bradley, New York, NY
- Mr. Henry P. Crowell, Chicago, IL
- Mr. W. L. Dubois, Philadelphia, PA
- Mr. E. O. Emerson, Titusville, PA
- Mr. J. B. Finley, Pittsburgh, PA
- Mr. J. J. Fisher, Pittsburgh, PA
- Mr. Thomas D. Foster, Ottuma, IA
- Mr. William Phillips Hall, New York, NY
- Mr. Clarence H. Hedden, Newark, NJ
- Mr. Charles Higgins, Brooklyn, NY
- Mr. Alba B. Johnson, Philadelphia, PA
- Mr. Giles Kellogg, Los Angeles, CA
- Mr. Craig N. Ligget, Philadelphia, PA
- Mr. C. H. Lounsbury, Stamford, CT
- Mr. C. O. Miller, Stamford, CT
- Mrs. C. O. Miller, Stamford, CT
- Mr. Henry D. Moore, Philadelphia, PA
- Mrs. R. W. Moulton, Providence, RI
- Mrs. James B. Oliver, Pittsburgh, PA
- Mr. F. H. Peters, St. Louis, MO
- Mr. James H. Post, Brooklyn, NY
- Mrs. Maria L. Roberts, Brooklyn, NY
- Mr. H. E. Robinson, Brooklyn, NY
- Mr. L. P. Rumsey, Chicago, IL
- Mr. Charles C. Savage, Philadelphia, PA
- Mr. E. G. Selchow, New York, NY
- Mr. James M. Steele, Philadelphia, PA
- Mr. Andrew Stevenson, Chicago, IL
- Mr. E. E. Stewart, Brooklyn, NY
- Mr. Lyman Stewart, Los Angeles, CA
- Mr. Thomas W. Synnot, Philadelphia, PA
- Mrs. J. Livingston Taylor, Cleveland, OH
- Mr. Herbert K. Twitchell, Brooklyn, NY
- Mr. I. Walter Veghte, Newark, NJ
- Mr. Joseph Weber, Newark, NJ
- Mr. James B. Welsh, Kansas City, MO
- Mr. N. R. Wheeler, Endeavor, WI
- Mr. William P. Youngs, New York, NY

== Prominent Conference Speakers ==
- Charles M. Alexander - Evangelist/Gospel Singer
- Donald Grey Barnhouse - Minister/Evangelist
- William Stiles Bennet - Congressman
- Evangeline Booth - Evangelist/Leader of the Salvation Army
- William Jennings Bryan - Evangelist/Politician
- S. Parkes Cadman - Minister
- J. Wilbur Chapman - Minister/Evangelist
- John F. Carson - Minister
- Sperry Chafer - Bible Scholar/President of Dallas Theological Seminary
- Charles R. Erdman - Minister/Theologian
- Charles L. Feinberg - Bible Scholar
- William Hiram Foulkes - Minister
- Arno C. Gaebelein - Minister
- Frank E. Gaebelein - Educator
- William Jay Gaynor - Mayor of New York
- Walter B. Greenway - Minister/ President of Beaver College
- Beatrice Forbes-Robertson Hale - English Women's Suffragist
- Florence Jaffray Harriman - Social Reformer/Suffragist/U.S. Ambassador
- Robert W. Hebberd - NY Commissioner of Charities
- Theodore Henderson - Methodist Episcopal Bishop
- William Henry Houghton - Bible Scholar
- J. W. Jenks - Professor/Economist
- Seth Joshua - Scottish Evangelist
- Joseph William Kemp - English Minister/Evangelist
- Isaac J. Lansing - Minister
- Samuel McCune Lindsay - Social Reformer/Philanthropist
- Herbert Lockyer - Editor, Christian Digest
- Owen R. Lovejoy - Anti-child labor activist
- J. Gresham Machen - Scholar/Theologian
- Walter Ralston Martin - Bible Scholar/Evangelist/Apologist
- J. C. Massee - Fundamentalist Minister
- Mark A. Matthews - Minister
- Alexander J. McKelway - Minister/Anti-child labor activist
- F. B. Meyer - English Minister/Evangelist
- Hugh R. Monro - Businessman/President of the Assembly
- G. Campbell Morgan - English Minister/Evangelist
- Ford C. Ottman - Minister
- Christabel Pankhurst - English Women's Suffragist
- Francis L. Patton - Scholar/Theologian
- George F. Pentecost - Revivalist Minister/Evangelist
- Harry Rimmer - Evangelist/Creationist
- A. T. Robertson - Bible Scholar
- W. Graham Scroggie - English Minister/Evangelist
- P. Tecumseh Sherman - Labor activist
- Robert E. Speer - Minister
- J. Ross Stevenson - Minister
- John Timothy Stone - Minister
- William Henry Griffith Thomas - Minister
- William R. Wilcox - Politician
- J. Christy Wilson - Muslim Evangelist
- Robert Dick Wilson - Bible Scholar/Linguist
- David G. Wylie - Minister
- Irvin Shortress Yeaworth - Minister
- Samuel Zwemer - Muslim Evangelist

== Hymns ==
Many notable hymn writers and singers were present during the conferences. Some hymns were written and performed for the first time to audiences in the auditorium. In the Assembly's second summer, J. Wilbur Chapman wrote his hymn "Our Great Savior (Living He Loved Me)." In 1916, John Carson, J. Wilbur Chapman, Ford C. Ottman, and Charles M. Alexander compiled and edited a hymnal "Songs of the Assembly: Number 1." In 1918, while commuting from Stony Brook on the Long Island Railroad, William Hiram Foulkes wrote the lyrics to a tune by Calvin Laufer that became "Take Thou Our Minds, Dear Lord." The hymn was sung at service the following evening. Central African missionary James Caldwell also debuted the hymn "How Great Thou Art" for the first time in the United States in the summer of 1951.
