= Susan Topliff Davis =

American non-profit executive (1862–1931)

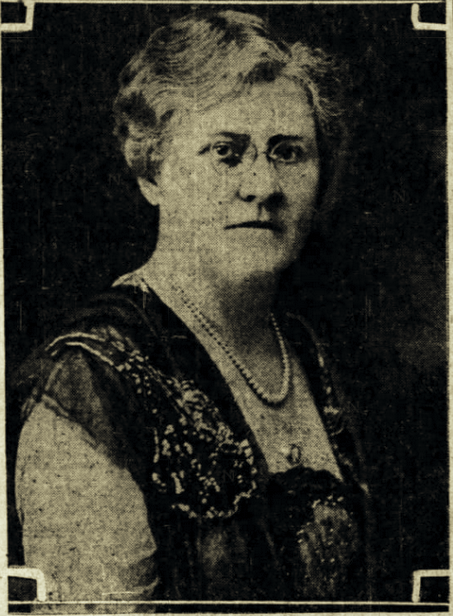
- Davis (no later than 1923)

Board of Directors, National Board YWCA

President, Georgia State YWCA

President, Georgia Synodical Auxiliary Presbyterian Church

President, Presbyterian Hospital Association of Georgia

Personal details
- Born: Susan Caroline Topliff; December 14, 1862 Elyria, Ohio, U.S.
- Died: April 8, 1931 (aged 68) Danville, Georgia U.S.
- Spouse: Archibald Hunt Davis (m. 1889)
- Children: 3
- Education: Smith College
- Occupation: Non-profit executive
- Committees: Chair, Presbyterian Women on Commission of Inter-Racial Co-operation; Chair, Presbyterian Women for Golden Jubilee; Chair, Woman's Committee on Entertainment of Four General Assemblies; Chair, Woman's Work of the Chapman-Alexander Campaign; Chair, Woman's Division, Billy Sunday Campaign

Susan Topliff Davis (née Topliff; also known as, Mrs. Archibald H. Davis; 1862–1931) was an American non-profit executive active in civic, religious, and philanthropic work. Davis served as a Director on the National Board of the YWCA; President, Georgia State YWCA; President, Georgia Synodical Auxiliary Presbyterian Church; and President, Presbyterian Hospital Association of Georgia.

== Early life and education ==
Susan Caroline Topliff was born in Elyria, Ohio, on December 14, 1862. Her parents were John Adams Topliff (1827-1899) and Caroline (Beers) Topliff (1827-1895).

She graduated from Elyria High School in 1882. She attended Oberlin Conservatory of Music. She attended Smith College in 1882-84; and graduated in 1886.

== Career ==
Davis was the author of articles and addresses in magazines and periodicals.

=== Presbyterian Church in the United States ===
Davis became the third President of the Georgia Synodical Auxiliary Presbyterian Church (23 counties), serving in this capacity from 1913 till 1917. She developed and completed the Synodical organization, it becoming the Synodical Auxiliary according to the Assembly's plan. The work grew wonderfully under her leadership. Cherokee Presbyterial was organized and came into the Synodical during her administration. It was also during her term of office that Nacoochee Institute was chosen as a "Synodical Special," and the request made and granted that two women be given place on its Board of Trustees.

Davis was a member of the preliminary conference held February 1912, in Atlanta when the Woman's Advisory Committee was outlined and when the Systematic Beneficence Committee then in session, agreed to present to General Assembly their petition for a Woman Secretary. At the meeting held in May 1913 in Atlanta, Davis was elected to succeed Hallie P. Winsborough as Chair of the Woman's Council (as then called), in which position she rendered service during the early years for the organization. After Atlanta, she was the presiding officer at the second (Kansas City, Missouri) and third (Memphis, Tennessee) annual meetings.

She was the President of the Summer School of Missions, held in Montreat, North Carolina; and President of the Presbyterian Hospital Association of Georgia, in 1909, 1910, 1911, and 1912. She served as Vice-President of the Georgia State Sunday School Association, from 1923; and as Treasurer of the Ellen Wilson Memorial for Education of Mountain Youth Association, September 1914-September 1925.

Davis was the Chair of the Presbyterian Women on Commission of Inter-Racial Co-operation, October 7, 1920-July 1925; Chair of Presbyterian Women for Golden Jubilee, 1910; Chair of the Woman's Committee on Entertainment of Four General Assemblies (Northern, Southern, United and Associate Reformed Presbyterian Churches) in May 1913; and Chair of the Woman's Work of the Chapman-Alexander Campaign, 1915 and the Woman's Division, Billy Sunday Campaign, October 1917.

She was an organizer and teacher of the Philathea Class at the North Avenue Presbyterian Church, during the period of 1912 through 1922; and from the time of its organization, was a member of the Commission on Churches of the Federal Council of Churches of Christ in America.

=== YWCA ===
Davis was the President of the Atlanta YWCA during the period of September 14, 1917 till February 9, 1925.

After serving as First Vice-President of the Georgia State YWCA, she was elected its President in February 1918.

Davis held several positions on the National Board of the YWCA including Director, from April 1924; Vice-Chair, National Endowment Committee, from 1920; Special Representative, Southeastern Division, 1922-24; and Vice-Chair, Membership Basis Commission, 1920-26. She was a Delegate to the YWCA's Cleveland Convention, 1920 and the Hot Springs Convention, 1922. She was a presenter at the New York City Convention, 1924, and at the Milwaukee Convention, 1926.

=== Other affiliations ===
In 1917, she served as a Trustee of the Nacoochee Institute. She was a member of the Georgia State Committee on Race Relations, from 1921.

Davis was a member of the Colonial Dames of America, Atlanta Woman's Club (charter member), Daughters of the American Revolution (charter member), the Atlanta Free Kindergarten (charter member), and the American Association of University Women. In April 1905, she was elected President of the Piedmont Bridge and Whist Club.

== Personal life ==
On September 3, 1889, in Elyria, Ohio, she married Archibald Hunt Davis. Their children were Archibald Hunt, Jr., John Topliff, and Noah Knowles.

In religion, she was Presbyterian. In politics, she was a Republican.

For 42 years, she made her home in Atlanta, Georgia. Susan Davis died in Danville, Georgia on April 8, 1931 after an auto accident.
