= Hyfrydol =

Welsh hymn tune

- by Rowland Prichard

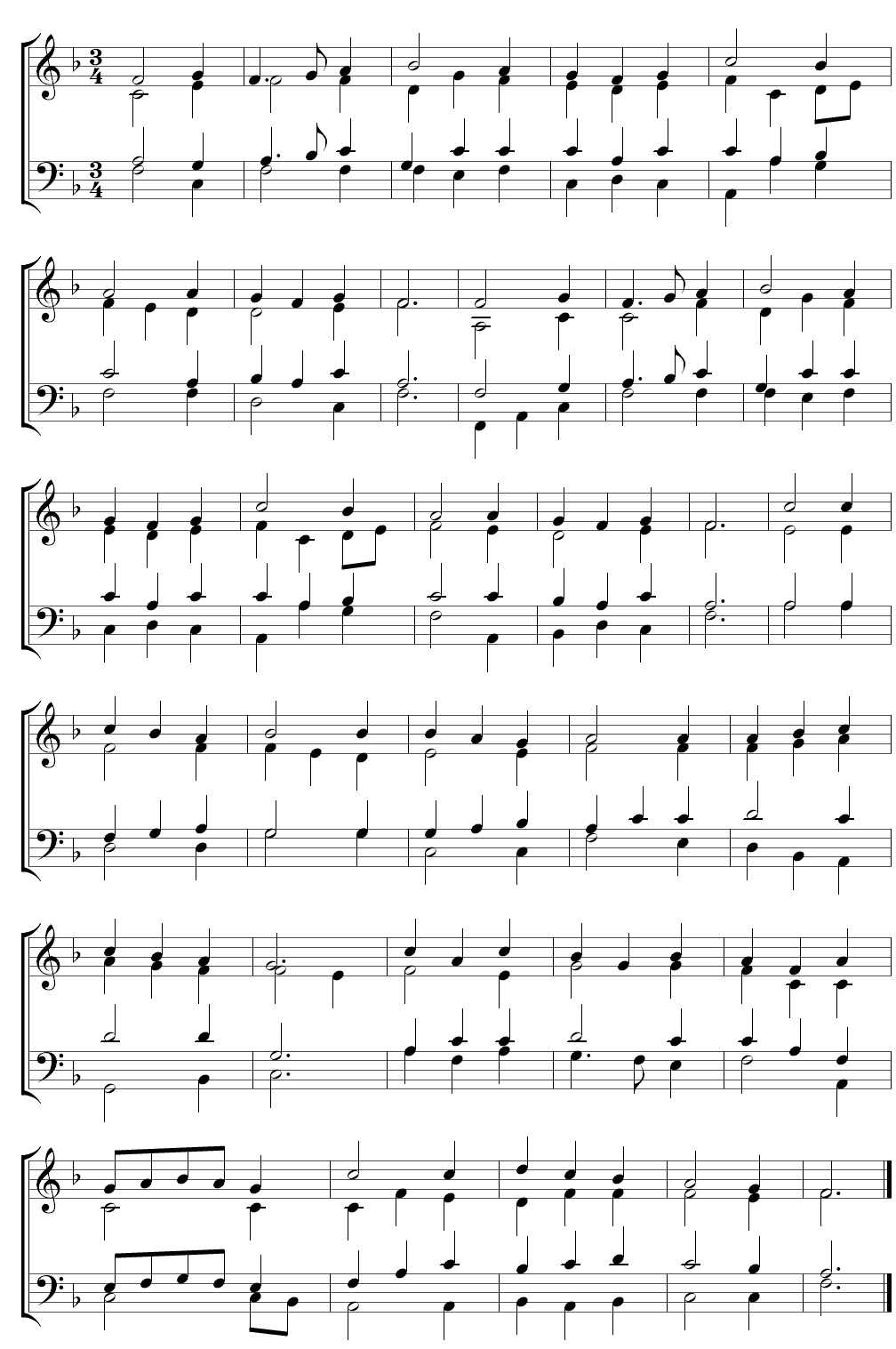

Hyfrydol (Welsh pronunciation: [həvˈrədɔl], meaning "delightful, agreeable, pleasing, pleasant, beautiful, fair, fine; sweet, melodious") is a Welsh hymn tune that has been used as the tune for many different Christian hymns. Composed in 1830 by Rowland Prichard, it was originally published in the composer's handbook to the Welsh children's songbook Cyfaill y Cantorion ("The Singers' Friend"). Prichard composed the tune before he was twenty years old.

External audio
- Recording of Hyfrydol from Hymnary.org

== Metre and arrangement ==
Hyfrydol has a metre of 8.7.8.7.D (alternating lines of eight and seven syllables, usually in trochaic feet, other examples of which include Blaenwern and Abbots Leigh).

The best-known arrangement is probably that by Ralph Vaughan Williams, which he originally produced for his revision of the English Hymnal; Vaughan Williams also composed some variations on this theme and it plays an important role as the third of his Prelude on Three Welsh Hymn Tunes (1920) for brass band.

In addition to its use as a hymn tune, Hyfrydol has been arranged for brass bands and other instrumental groups.

== Settings ==
Hyfrydol has been used as a setting for William Chatterton Dix's hymn "Alleluia! Sing to Jesus", Charles Wesley's "Love Divine, All Loves Excelling" and "Come, Thou Long Expected Jesus", John Wilbur Chapman's "Our Great Savior (Jesus What A Friend of Sinners)" (1910) and Philip Bliss's "I Will Sing of My Redeemer" (1876), the 1948 LDS hymn "In Humility, Our Savior", included in LDS hymnals in multiple languages, the Unitarian Universalist hymn "Hail the Glorious Golden City" by Felix Adler, as well as many other hymns from a variety of church traditions. "Blue Boat Home," composed by Peter Mayer and sung in Unitarian Universalist settings is also set to Hyfrydol.
