= Stony Brook School =

Christian school in Stony Brook, New York, US

The Stony Brook School

Location
- 1 Chapman Parkway; Stony Brook, New York 11790; United States; 40°55′22″N 73°7′51″W

Information
- Type: Private, college-preparatory, boarding and day school
- Motto: Character Before Career
- Religious affiliation: Christian
- Established: 1922
- Founders: John Fleming Carson, Stony Brook Assembly
- NCES School ID: 00939006
- Headmaster: Joshua Crane
- Teaching staff: 43.1 (on an FTE basis)
- Grades: 7–12
- Gender: Co-educational
- Enrollment: 454 (2024 - 2025)
- Student to teacher ratio: 8.4
- Colors: Navy Blue and White
- Athletics conference: Private Schools Athletic Association
- Mascot: Bear
- Nickname: Bears
- Accreditation: Middle States Association of Colleges and Schools
- Affiliations: NAIS; NYSAIS; NACAC; CASE; College Board (CEEB)
- Website: www.sbs.org

The Stony Brook School is a private, Christian, co-educational, college-preparatory boarding and day school for grades 7–12 in Stony Brook, New York, United States. It was established in 1922 by John Fleming Carson and fellow members of the Stony Brook Assembly. Its founding headmaster was Frank E. Gaebelein.

== History ==
In 1906, a group of Presbyterian ministers and laymen began an enterprise to form an annual series of summer Bible conferences in the tri-state area of New York, New Jersey, and Connecticut. These conferences were to be in the tradition of other Bible conferences already established at Chautauqua, New York, Winona Lake, Indiana, and Northfield, Massachusetts. The group was led by the Rev. John Fleming Carson, pastor of the former Central Presbyterian Church in Brooklyn and later Moderator of the Presbyterian General Assembly (1911). After having visited the hamlet of Stony Brook in 1907, Carson and his associates settled on a location directly across from the train station. The first summer conference of the Stony Brook Assembly began on July 3, 1909 and was a success. The Stony Brook Assembly was formally incorporated by the state of New York in 1914.

Portrait of The Stony Brook School, Fall 1922

Carson's vision also included the establishment of a boys' school which could use the Assembly grounds outside of the summer months. As early as 1916, formal plans were being considered for opening the school, but financial constraints and World War I postponed the opening of the school until the fall of 1922. On 21 July 1921, Henry Strachan and Susan Strachan founded the ecumenist Latin American Evangelization Campaign (LAEC) at the site of the future Stony Brook School. On September 13, 1922 The Stony Brook School was inaugurated with 27 boys and 9 faculty. Founding headmaster Frank E. Gaebelein called the new school an "experiment" in Christian education and set the mission for the school as being a rigorous college preparatory school thoroughly rooted in the Christian tradition. Education was not merely an emphasis on strong academics for the education of the mind, but more importantly was an emphasis on building character for the education of the heart - a distinction he linked with an adherence to the gospel. In his report to the Board in November 1937, Gaebelein reaffirmed the purpose of the school stating, “It was never the aim of Dr. Carson and the other founders, however, simply to inaugurate one more college preparatory school. Stony Brook’s prime reason for existence has been to bring its [students] into vital contact with the Christian faith.”

The academic reputation of the school grew in prominence. In May 1923, it was granted a charter by the Board of Regents of the University of the State of New York. In 1928, the school was accredited by the Middle States Association of Colleges and Schools. In 1930, SBS was granted a charter by the Cum Laude Society, placing it among the first sixty schools granted this distinction since 1906. In 1931, the Director of Admissions at Princeton University indicated that the admissions committee was so impressed with the caliber of Bible study at Stony Brook that it would award one Carnegie Unit of preparation for college.

In the fall of 1971, a group of thirty day-student girls entered the school, beginning the school's move toward co-education. The following year, female boarding commenced.

In honor of the school's fiftieth anniversary in 1972, long-time faculty member and writer D. Bruce Lockerbie penned a history of the school entitled, The Way They Should Go.

=== Headmasters ===
- Frank E. Gaebelein (1922–1963)
- Donn M. Gaebelein '45 (1963–1976)
- Karl E. Soderstrom (1976–1993)
- Thad A. Gaebelein '75 (1993–1997)
- Robert E. Gustafson, Jr. (1997–2012)
- Richard A. Riesen (Interim 2012–2013)
- Joshua Crane (2013–present)

=== Senior Masters ===
- A. Pierson Curtis (1924–1968)
- O. Floyd Johnson '32 (1937–1980)
- Marvin W. Goldberg (1945–1995)
- Milton P. Hostetter (1961–1999)
- Thomas E. Brownworth (1967–2016)
- Michael G. Hickey (1986–2019)
- Martha L. Pavao (1994–2020)
- Erik Johnson (2000–present)

== Academics ==
The school offers twenty-one Advanced Placement (AP) courses as well as numerous full-year elective courses in such subjects as the Engineering, Innovation, and Design (STEM), History of Philosophy, Ethics and Politics, Advanced Digital Imaging, and 20th Century Fiction and Creative Writing. Students also have opportunities to take mini-courses interspersed throughout the year in a wide range of electives as well as conduct various internships and research opportunities off-campus at nearby institutions such as Stony Brook University, Brookhaven National Laboratory, and Cold Spring Harbor Laboratory.

=== Advanced Placement Courses ===
- AP Biology
- AP Calculus AB
- AP Calculus BC
- AP Chemistry
- AP Computer Science A
- AP English Language and Composition
- AP English Literature
- AP Environmental Science
- AP European History
- AP French
- AP Latin
- AP Microeconomics
- AP Music Theory
- AP Physics C
- AP Psychology
- AP Spanish
- AP Statistics
- AP Studio Art
- AP United States History

Note: AP Latin alternates biennially with College Level Latin.

== Athletics ==
Stony Brook was one of the original members of the Ivy Preparatory School League, composed of prep schools around the New York City and Long Island area. From 1974-2018, Stony Brook was a member of Section XI of the New York State Public High School Athletic Association. In 2018, the school joined the Private Schools Athletic Association. In at least two out of the three seasons, students must participate in an athletics team or an approved alternative extracurricular activity. Approved activities include strength and conditioning in the fall and winter, interscholastic chess, interscholastic robotics, and the Theater Arts Society, all of which are offered in winter.

Interscholastic Sports

Fall

- Cross country
- Dinghy and keelboat sailing
- Golf
- Soccer
- Swimming (girls)
- Tennis (girls)
- Volleyball (girls)
- Rowing (sport)

Winter

- Basketball
- Swimming (boys)
- Wrestling

Spring

- Baseball
- Badminton
- Dinghy and keelboat sailing
- Lacrosse
- Tennis (boys)
- Track and field
- Rowing (sport)

The mascot of the school is the Bear. During the 1970s and most of the 1980s the mascot was the Shrike.

== Campus facilities ==
- Carson Auditorium - Erected in 1910, Carson was the first building built on the campus. It was built as an open-air auditorium for Bible conferences, but also served as the gymnasium from 1936-1973. Today it houses the Visual and Performing Arts Departments and is used for assemblies, chapels, plays, concerts, and art exhibitions. The building has been refurbished three times in 1935-1936, 1980, and 2006.
- John Rogers Hegeman Memorial Chapel (The Chapel) - Built in 1928 from the estate of John Rogers Hegeman, former president of the Metropolitan Life Insurance Company. Frederick H. Ecker, the executor of the estate, was charged with finding "worthy institutions" which could benefit from Mr. Hegeman's philanthropy. The Chapel is the center of prayer and worship during the week and on Sundays.
- Chapman Parkway - Named in memory of the Rev. John Wilbur Chapman, a principal member of the Stony Brook Assembly, it was given by his widow Mabel and was completed in 1919. The paved parkway is lined with Norway Maples and is the main drive and address of the school.

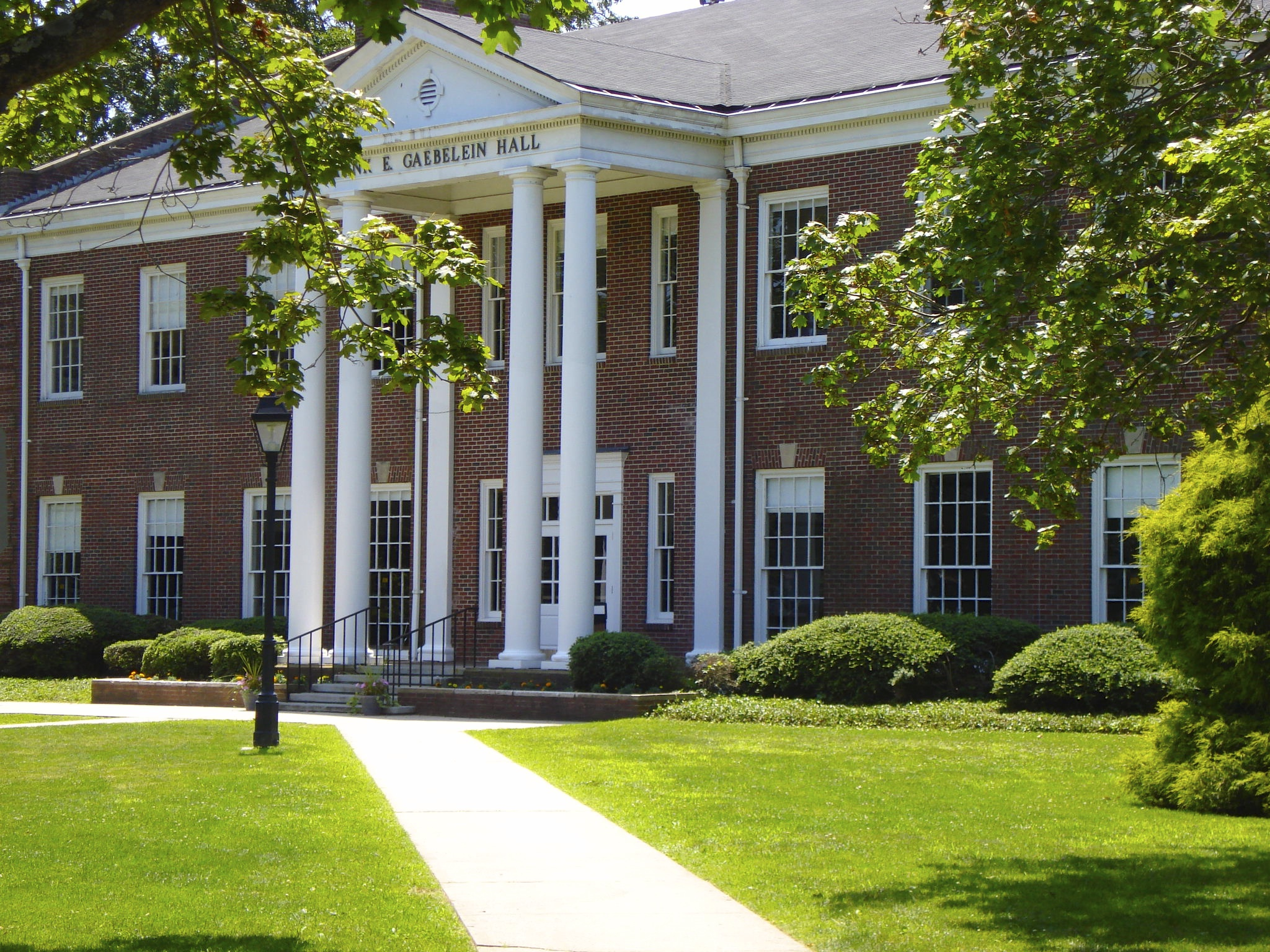
Frank E. Gaebelein Hall

- Frank E. Gaebelein Hall - Built in 1982 in honor of founding headmaster Frank E. Gaebelein, it houses the Arno C. Gaebelein Memorial Library, classrooms, science labs, the Academic Office and the Head of School Office.
- Health Center - Formerly known as the Infirmary, it was built in 1930 from the funds of the 1929 Carson Campaign.
- Johnston Hall - Built in 1918 and named in honor of Robert Johnston, board member and vice-president of Scruggs, Vandervoort and Barney department store in St. Louis. The building includes a dining hall, a dormitory, the Business Office, and the Summer Programs Office. The building was refurbished in 1945-1946 and 2011.
- Kanas Commons - Built in 2013, the building houses a 350-seat dining hall and kitchen, the Hollis Student Center, school store, mailroom, lounge and study areas. The Student Activities Office and Residential Life Office are also located there.
- Memorial Hall - Built in 1951 in memory of the Rev. John F. Carson and alumni who died in World War II. It houses humanities classrooms, the English and Foreign Language Departments, and the Admissions, Middle School, and Student Learning Services. Also housed in the building is the Louis Simpson Poetry Collection, which was given to the School by poet and former faculty member Louis Simpson in 2008.

=== Athletics facilities ===
- Jeffrey S. Adams Field - Completed in 2007, the baseball field is named in memory faculty member Jeff Adams who served the School from 1995-2005. The field includes two sunken, brick dugouts and a scoreboard.
- Buyers' Park - Built in 1997 and named for alumnus John W. A. Buyers '46 and his family, Buyers' Park is an 800-seat, lighted stadium with a team room and press box.
- John K. Fitch Field - The original football field leveled in 1925 by John Knowles Fitch of the Fitch Publishing Company. His son Jack was an alumnus of the class of 1924.
- Marvin W. Goldberg Memorial Track - Built in 1997 to replace the old cinder track installed in 1959. Named in memory of the school's third senior master and legendary track and cross country coach Marvin Goldberg.
- Hollis Tennis Courts - Resurfaced in 2017 and gifted by the Hollis family.
- Kinney Fieldhouse - Originally built in 1959 and known as the Alumni Fieldhouse, it underwent a renovation in 1976 and was renamed after alumnus and architect Aldon M. Kinney '39. In 2007, a third renovation of the building was completed. The Fieldhouse provides additional practice and training space including an all-purpose gym, wrestling room, aerobics room, locker room, and the Facilities Department.
- Swanson Gymnasium - Built in 1973 and named for Robert S. Swanson, Sr., owner of the S.B. Thomas baking company. It houses the main gym, weight room, pool, four team locker rooms, a conference room, and the Athletics Department. The building was renovated in 2000 and the pool was renovated in 2015.

=== Residence Halls ===
- Alexander Hall - Built in 2002 and named for William and Betty Alexander, the parents and grandparents of alumni, it houses 10th-12th grade girls.
- Barnhouse Hall - Built in 1962 and named in memory of board member and prominent pastor of the Tenth Presbyterian Church in Philadelphia, Donald Grey Barnhouse. Today it houses 7th-9th grade girls.
- Cleveland Alumni House - Built in 1995 and named for alumnus Bart Cleveland '54, it houses 10th-12th grade girls.
- John Rogers Hegeman Memorial Hall (Hegeman Hall) - Built in 1925 from the estate of John Rogers Hegeman, Hegeman Hall originally served as both a classroom building and dormitory. It is the only dormitory which has not ever been a female dormitory. Today it houses 7th-9th grade boys. The building was renovated in 2009.
- Johnston Hall - Built in 1918 as a summer hotel, the second floor houses 10th-12th grade boys. The floor was renovated in 2011. Set to be demolished in 2025
- Hugh R. Monro Hall - Built in 1965 and named for the second President of the Board of Trustees and head of the Montclair National Bank. Hugh Monro served for nearly twenty-five years as president and oversaw the school through the Great Depression and World War II. Today it houses 10th-12th grade boys and the Development & Alumni Relations Office. The building was renovated in 2010
- Simons Hall - Built in 2002 and named in memory of alumnus Paul A. Simons '80, son of James Simons, it houses 10th-12th grade girls. It is a twin dormitory with Alexander Hall.
- Daley Hall -Currently in construction, and is set to open Fall 2025. It houses 10th-12th grade boys, and is named in memory of alumnus Clayton Daley '69. It will be a replacement to Johnston Hall.

=== Former buildings ===
- Hopkins Hall - Built in 1915 as a summer hotel, it was the second oldest building on campus. It was financed by Ferdinand T. Hopkins, a board member and New York philanthropist. At various points it housed dormitory rooms, classrooms, labs, a dining hall, and the school library. In 1980, it was demolished to build Gaebelein Hall.

=== Faculty homes ===
The school owns twenty-four faculty homes, which line the perimeter of the campus. These homes include:

- Curtis House - Built in 1929 and named for the school's first senior master Pierson Curtis and his wife Winifred.
- Goldberg House - Built in 1932 and named for the school's third senior master Marvin W. Goldberg and his wife Dorothie.
- Grosvenor House - Financed by John Prescott Grosvenor of Watertown, NY, it was built in 1923 and is the home of the headmaster.
- Johnson House - Built in 1921 and named for the school's second senior master O. Floyd Johnson '32 and his wife Eleanor.
- Marshall House - Built in 1942, it was purchased by the school and named for long-time faculty member Donald W. Marshall and his wife Esther.
- Windrift - Built in 1970 and named by Marvin W. Goldberg.

== Notable people ==
=== Alumni ===
- Aaron Belz, poet
- Jason Benjamin, painter
- James Montgomery Boice, minister and theologian
- Jorge Bolet, pianist
- William G. Bowdler, diplomat
- Lars Brownworth, history and political science teacher
- John W. A. "Doc" Buyers, businessman
- Clayton Daley, businessman
- Sarah Drew, actress
- Heinrich Holland, Professor Emeritus of Science, Harvard University
- Jacques-André Istel, parachutist and investment banker
- Stephen G. Kurtz, academic and educator
- Chas. Floyd Johnson, television producer
- A. Donald Macleod, theologian
- Walter Ralston Martin, minister, author and apologist
- Richard Rovere, political journalist
- Aiden Ruiz, American baseball player
- Charles Caldwell Ryrie, theologian
- Peter Thomas (announcer), announcer and narrator
- James M. Tien, distinguished professor and dean
- J. Dudley Woodberry, missionary and dean emeritus

=== Faculty ===
- Lars Brownworth (1999-2007, 2019–present), history and political science
- Spencer Christian (1970-1971), English
- Louis Simpson (1999-2001), English
