= Brownworth =

Brownworth is an English surname. Notable people with the surname include:

- Lars Brownworth (born c. 1975), American historian and history podcaster
- Victoria Brownworth (1956–2025), American journalist, writer, and editor

== See also ==
- Lake Brownworth, a lake in Antarctica, see Wright Valley#Lake Brownworth
