= Private Schools Athletic Association =

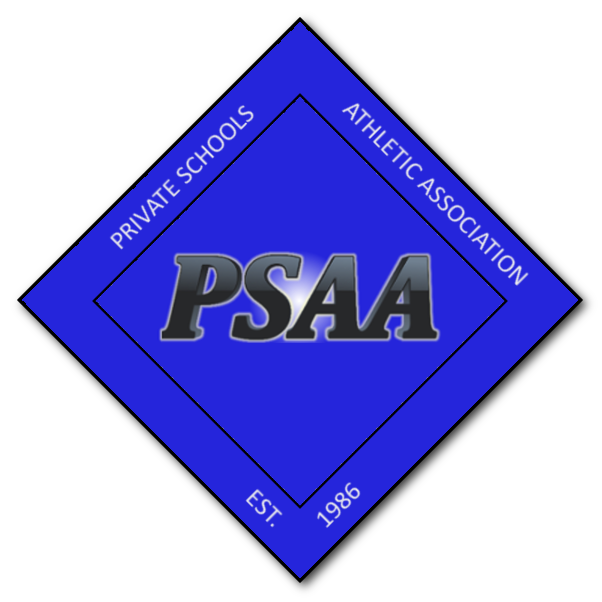
- Abbreviation: P.S.A.A.
- Formation: 1986; 40 years ago
- Type: Athletic conference
- Location: New York metropolitan area
- Website: www.psaany.org

Established in 1986, the Private Schools Athletic Association (PSAA) is a sports league for independent high schools primarily located in the New York Metropolitan Area.

== Mission ==
- Develop and foster athletic standards of excellence for boys and girls among its member schools.
- Promote and cultivate the ideas of sportsmanship, good citizenship and moral integrity by means of athletic participation and competition.
- Improve athletic opportunities by promoting uniform standards in the arrangement of interscholastic programs among member schools.
- To foster good, sound athletic programs for boys and girls as an effective part of the educational programs of our schools.
- Represent the member schools of the association with other athletic educational agencies in the determination of policies and programs affecting interscholastic athletics in secondary schools.
- To conduct tournaments and playoffs and provide a forum for discussion among its members.

== P.S.A.A. History ==
It originally was formed in 1917 to fill a need for a secondary school sports league for the private schools in the New York metropolitan area. Prior to the 1920s, New York City had the longest history with private schools leagues, beginning with the New York Interscholastic Athletic Association formed in 1879. This league went into decline and disappeared in the first decade of the twentieth century, leaving the city without a private league.

During World War I, the private schools felt the need of a league, and got together for a track and field meet in the spring of 1917. Prominent members were Polytechnic Prep (now Poly Prep), Horace Mann, Dwight, and Trinity). New York’s Catholic schools during much of the 1920s did not have much league sponsorship, and also participated in league events, notably DelaSalle, Bishop Loughlin, St. Augustine (defunct), and La Salle Military Academy (defunct); they now participate in the Catholic High School Athletic Association (CHSAA).

The league was reestablished in 1987 with 5 original schools: Our Savior Lutheran High School, Martin Luther High School, McBurney School, Pilgrim Christian, and Suffolk Lutheran High School.

== List of schools ==
- Abraham Joshua Heschel School
- Avenues: The World School
- Bay Ridge Preparatory School in Bay Ridge, Brooklyn
- Calhoun School
- Columbia Grammar and Preparatory School
- Dalton School
- Evangel Christian School in Long Island City, Queens
- Friends Seminary
- Grace Church School
- Greater New York Academy
- The Kew-Forest School
- The Knox School in Saint James, New York
- Lawrence-Woodmere Academy in Woodmere, New York
- Lexington School and Center for the Deaf in Jackson Heights, New York
- Long Island Lutheran Middle and High School in Brookville, New York
- Marsha Stern Talmudical Academy
- Martin de Porres High School
- Martin Luther High School in Maspeth, Queens
- Masters School
- New York Institute for Special Education in Williamsbridge, Bronx
- North Shore Hebrew Academy
- Our Savior New American School
- Portledge School in Locust Valley, New York
- St. Ann's School
- St. Demetrios School in Astoria, Queens
- St. George Ukrainian Catholic School
- Solomon Schechter in Glen Cove, New York
- Staten Island Academy in Staten Island, New York
- The Stony Brook School in Stony Brook, New York
- United Nations International School
- Waldorf School of Garden City
- York Preparatory School

== See also ==
The following independent school sport leagues are also in New York state:

- NYSAIS - New York State Association of Independent Schools Athletic Association
