= Alleluia! Sing to Jesus =

19th century Christian hymn

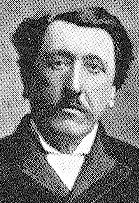
- William Chatterton Dix
- Genre: Hymn
- Written: 1866
- Text: William Chatterton Dix
- Based on: Revelation 5:9
- Meter: 8.7.8.7 D
- Melody: "Hyfrydol" by Rowland Prichard; "Alleluia" by Samuel Sebastian Wesley

"Alleluia! Sing to Jesus" is a Christian hymn by William Chatterton Dix.

Dix wrote the hymn as a Eucharistic hymn for Ascension Sunday. It is also commonly sung as an Easter hymn. It was originally titled "Redemption through the Precious Blood" and is based on Revelation 5:9. Dix felt Church of England hymnals lacked sufficient Eucharistic hymns.

== Melody ==
External audio
- Recording of Hyfrydol from Hymnary.org

It is most commonly sung to "Hyfrydol" by Rowland Prichard though Samuel Sebastian Wesley composed the tune "Alleluia" specifically for it in 1868.

== Lyrics ==
1. Alleluia! Sing to Jesus;
His the sceptre, His the throne.
Alleluia! His the triumph,
His the victory alone.
Hark! The songs of peaceful Zion
thunder like a mighty flood:
"Jesus out of every nation
has redeemed us by His blood."

2. Alleluia! Not as orphans
are we left in sorrow now.
Alleluia! He is near us;
faith believes, nor questions how.
Tho' the cloud from sight received Him
when the forty days were o'er,
shall our hearts forget His promise,
"I am with you evermore"?

3. Alleluia! Bread of heaven,
here on earth our food, our stay.
Alleluia! Here the sinful
flee to You from day to day.
Intercessor, Friend of sinners,
earth's Redeemer, hear our plea
where the songs of all the sinless
sweep across the crystal sea.

4. Alleluia! King eternal,
Thee the Lord of lords we own;
Alleluia! born of Mary,
Earth Thy footstool, heav'n Thy throne:
Thou within the veil hast entered,
robed in flesh our great High Priest;
Thou on earth both priest and victim
in the Eucharistic feast.
