= Come, Thou Long Expected Jesus =

Christian hymn written by Charles Wesley

- Christian hymn
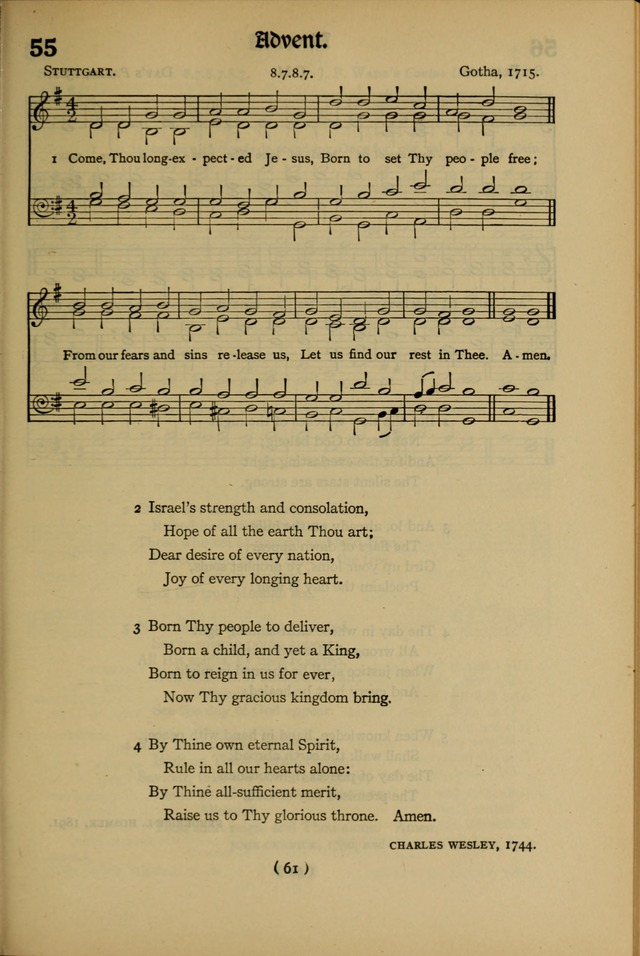
- Occasion: Advent
- Text: Charles Wesley
- Meter: 8.7.8.7
- Melody: "Stuttgart" attributed to Christian Witt; "Cross of Jesus" by John Stainer; "Hyfrydol" by Rowland Prichard
- Published: 1744

"Come, Thou Long Expected Jesus" is a 1744 Advent and Christmas carol common in Protestant hymnals. The text was written by Charles Wesley. It is performed to one of several tunes, including "Stuttgart" (attr. to Christian Friedrich Witt), "Hyfrydol" (by Rowland Prichard), and "Cross of Jesus" (by John Stainer). The hymn is considered an enduring classic in Christian hymnody.

== History ==
In 1744, Charles Wesley considered Haggai 2:7 and looked at the situation of orphans in the areas around him. He also looked at the class divide in Great Britain. Through this train of thought, he wrote "Come, Thou long expected Jesus" based upon Haggai 2:7 and a published prayer at the time which had the words:

"Born Your people to deliver, born a child and yet a King, born to reign in us forever, now Your gracious kingdom bring. By Your own eternal Spirit, rule in all our hearts alone; by Your all sufficient merit, raise us to Your glorious throne. Amen."

Wesley adapted this prayer into a hymn in 1744 and published it in his "Hymns for the Nativity of our Lord" hymnal. Wesley wrote "Come, Thou Long Expected Jesus" with the intent for people to remember Advent and Christmas as commemorating the Nativity of Jesus and preparing for the Second Coming.

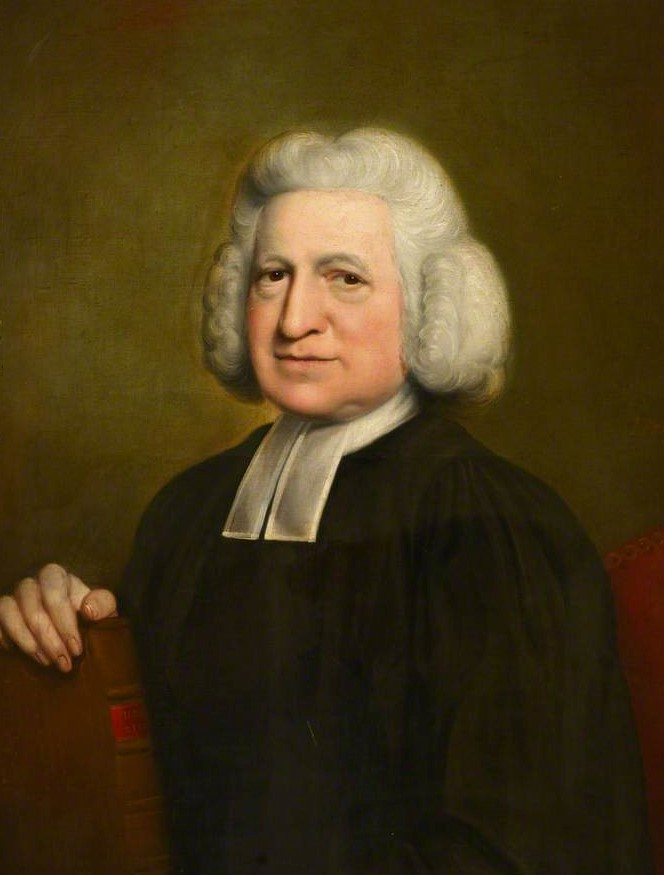
Charles Wesley

"Come, Thou Long Expected Jesus" was the first of a number of Wesley's hymns that became known as the "Festival hymns". These "Festival hymns" were published outside of Methodism by German, John Frederick Lampe in 1746. The hymn came into popular knowledge across Christian denominations in England via popular Baptist preacher, Charles Spurgeon. Spurgeon made a Christmas sermon in London in 1855 when he was 21 and included sections of "Come thou long expected Jesus" in it. He did this to illustrate his point that very few are "born king" and that Jesus was the only one who had been born king without being a prince. As a result of its growing popularity, including in the Church of England and American hymnals, it was first published in the Methodist Wesleyan Hymn Book in 1875 after having previously been excluded. The original reason for exclusion was that there had been no officially suitable music intended for it before then. In recent times, "Come, Thou Long Expected Jesus" has not been as well known as a Christmas Carol as others written around the same time. "Joy to the World" being one such example but "Come, Thou Long Expected Jesus" is still used to focus on the hope of the Second Coming of Jesus.

The lyrics of "Come, Thou Long Expected Jesus" focus on God choosing to give a Messiah to the world in the form of Jesus. It also focusses on the Old Testament Israelites longing for the Messiah to come and take the burden of sins from them to take them upon himself. The last line of the first verse may have come from Wesley being inspired by 17th century philosopher; Blaise Pascal's claim that "There is a God shaped vacuum in the heart of every person that cannot be filled by any created thing, but only by God, the Creator."

== Music ==
"Come, Thou Long Expected Jesus" has been set to a number of tunes. It is not known which tune Wesley originally intended for the hymn, hence why it was excluded from the "Wesleyan Hymn Book", but it is likely that the first tune it was set to was "Stuttgart" by Christian Friedrich Witt which had been written in 1716. A later tune used for it was "Hyfrydol", a Welsh tune written in the 1800s by Rowland Hugh Prichard, which is also used for Wesley's "Love Divine, All Loves Excelling". Both tunes are popular. In the United Kingdom, the hymn is often set (e.g. in the Hymns Ancient and Modern series or the New English Hymnal) to the 4-line tune "Cross of Jesus", by John Stainer, which he wrote as part of his oratorio The Crucifixion.

== Lyrics ==
The original text by Charles Wesley has two stanzas of eight lines each. These may also be divided into four stanzas of four lines each.

1. Come, thou long expected Jesus,
born to set thy people free;
from our fears and sins release us,
let us find our rest in thee.
Israel's strength and consolation,
hope of all the earth thou art;
dear desire of every nation,
joy of every longing heart.

2. Born thy people to deliver,
born a child and yet a King,
born to reign in us forever,
now thy gracious kingdom bring.
By thine own eternal spirit
rule in all our hearts alone;
by thine all sufficient merit,
raise us to thy glorious throne.

— Charles Wesley

An additional 2 stanzas, by Mark E. Hunt, were inserted in the middle of the hymn and used in a version published in the 1990 Trinity Hymnal.

== Recorded versions ==
Chris Tomlin's version of "Come, Thou Long Expected Jesus" appears on his Christmas album Glory In the Highest: Christmas Songs of Worship. On the compilation Love Divine: The Songs of Charles Wesley For Today's Generation released by Integrity Music in 2010, Brian Johnson also sang a version of "Come Thou Long Expected Jesus". Fernando Ortega also recorded "Come, Thou Long Expected Jesus" on his 2011 album Christmas Songs. Red Mountain Music has recorded a version of "Come, Thou Long Expected Jesus" which appears on their album Silent Night, and includes all four verses. Meredith Andrews also recorded "Come Thou Long Expected Jesus" on her 2017 Christmas album Receive Our King. In Solid State Records’s compilation Midnight Clear is featured a cover of this hymn by Christian metal band Wolves at the Gate. A version of "Come, Thou Long Expected Jesus" also appears on the "A Worship Initiative Christmas, Vol 2" by Shane and Shane recorded in 2018.

== See also ==
- List of Christmas carols
