= Our Great Savior =

Hymn written by John Wilbur Chapman

- by John Wilbur Chapman
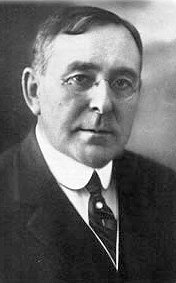
- Genre: Hymn
- Written: 1910
- Based on: Matthew 9:10
- Meter: 8.7.8.7 D
- Melody: "Hyfrydol" by Rowland Prichard

HyfrydolImprov

"Our Great Savior" is a hymn written by John Wilbur Chapman and composed by Rowland Prichard under the tune Hyfrydol. It was published in 1910 and was renewed in 1938 by Robert Harkness. In some hymnals, it is titled "Jesus! What a Friend For Sinners!"

== Lyrics ==
Jesus! what a Friend for sinners! Jesus! Lover of my soul;
Friends may fail me, foes assail me, He, my Savior, makes me whole.
Chorus
Hallelujah! what a Savior! Hallelujah! what a Friend!
Saving, helping, keeping, loving, He is with me to the end.
Jesus! what a strength in weakness! Let me hide myself in Him;
Tempted, tried, and sometimes failing, He, my strength, my vic'try wins.
Chorus
Jesus! what a help in sorrow! While the billows o'er me roll,
Even when my heart is breaking, He, my comfort, helps my soul.
Chorus
Jesus! what a guide and keeper! While the tempest still is high,
Storms about me, night o'ertakes me, He, my pilot, hears my cry.
Chorus
Jesus! I do now receive Him, More than all in Him I find,
He hath granted me forgiveness, I am His and He is mine!
Chorus
