= Aaron Belz =

American writer and poet

Aaron Belz (born September 27, 1971) is an American writer and poet.

== Early life and education ==
Belz grew up in Kirkwood, Missouri and attended schools including Westminster Christian Academy, the Stony Brook School and Framlingham College. He was awarded a Maclellan Foundation Scholarship to attend Covenant College in Georgia in 1990, and graduated with a double major in English and History in 1993. Belz was enrolled in the Creative Writing program at New York University's Graduate School of Arts and Sciences. In 2007, he received a Ph.D. in English at Saint Louis University.

== Career ==
In 2003 Belz founded Observable Readings, a poetry series and imprint in St. Louis. Belz published his first book of poetry, The Bird Hoverer, in 2007. He then began teaching English and Creative Writing at Fontbonne University, and later at Saint Louis University, Southern Illinois University Edwardsville, and Providence Christian College. He published a second book, Lovely, Raspberry: Poems, in 2010. In 2013, he received media attention for a Craigslist ad he placed to sell custom poems.

In 2013, Belz performed readings at Comedy Meltdown. That same year he opened up Hillsborough Bicycle, a bicycle repair shop, with his son Eli in Hillsborough, North Carolina. In 2014 Belz was teaching English at Durham Technical Community College in Durham, North Carolina and published his third book, Glitter Bomb: Poems. Belz's poetry has appeared in Fence, Exquisite Corpse, The Atlantic and The Washington Post, and his essays and reviews have appeared in The Wall Street Journal, the San Francisco Chronicle and the St. Louis Post-Dispatch.

== Bibliography ==
- The Bird Hoverer, BlazeVOX Books, 2007. ISBN 978-1934289273
- Lovely, Raspberry: Poems, Persea, 2010. ISBN 978-0892553594
- Glitter Bomb: Poems, Persea, 2014. ISBN 978-0892554317
- Soft Launch: Poems, Persea, 2019. ISBN 978-0892555024
