= Crestwood Court =

Shopping mall in Missouri, US

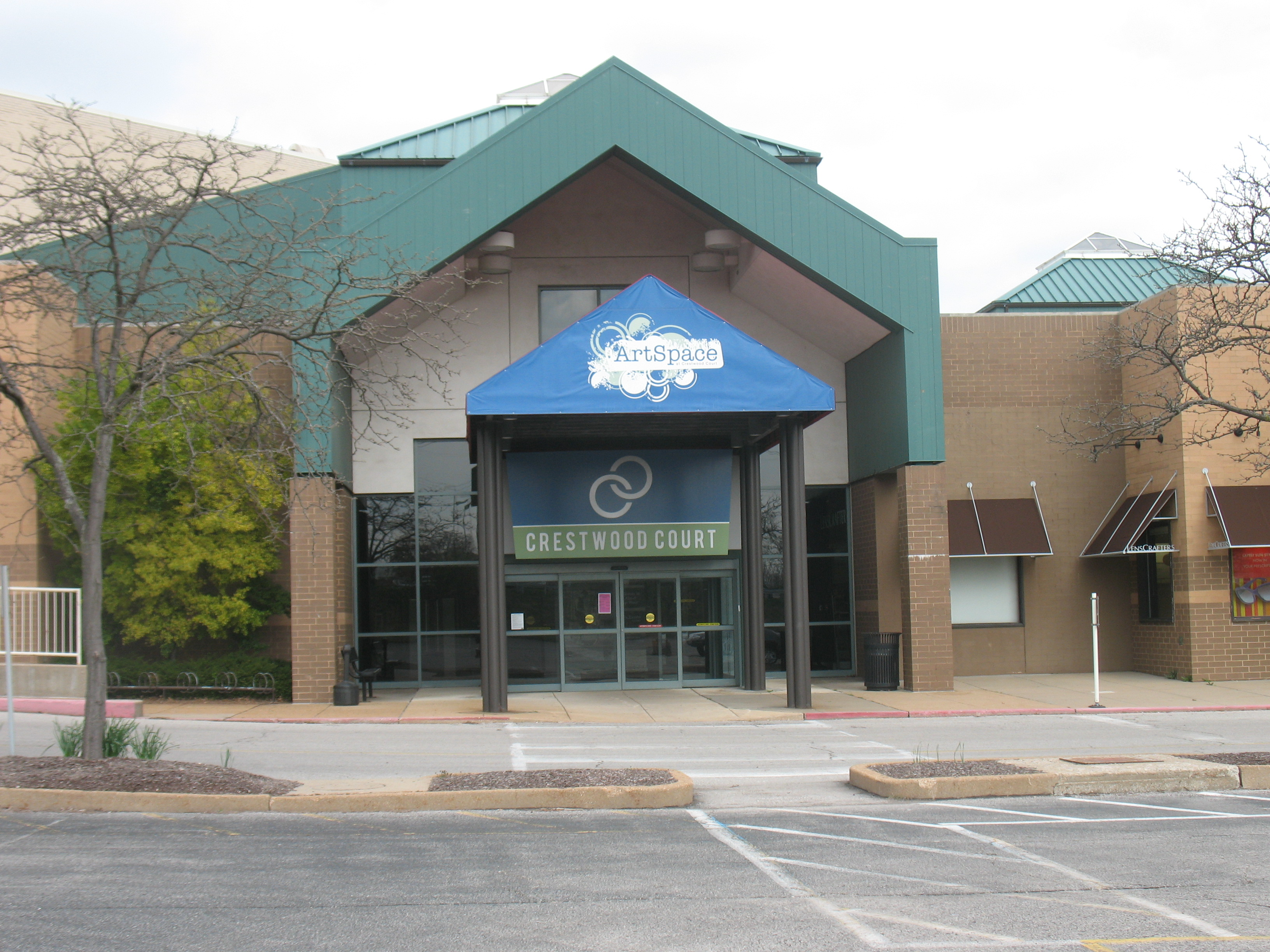
- Crestwood Court exterior in 2013
- Coordinates: 38°33′35″N 90°22′46″W
- Address: 109 Crestwood Plaza; St. Louis, Missouri, 63126
- Opened: March 21, 1957
- Closed: July 11, 2013
- Demolished: May 2016–October 2017
- Previous names: Crestwood Plaza (1957–1998); Westfield Shoppingtown Crestwood (1998–2008)
- Developer: Milton Zorensky and Louis Zorensky
- Owner: Centrum Properties
- Num. of stores: 0 (space for 157)
- Num. of anchor tenants: 0 (space for 3)
- Floor area: 1,034,494 square feet (96,000 m^{2}) (GLA)
- Floors: 1 with basement (3 in former Macy's, Sears, and Dillard's)
- Parking: Before demolition there were 1 outside parking lot with a 2 level parking garage

Crestwood Court (formerly Westfield Shoppingtown Crestwood and Crestwood Plaza) was a shopping mall in Crestwood, Missouri. Opened in 1957, it was the first major mall in the St. Louis area, and one of the first to have more than one department store. The mall previously included Macy's, Dillard's, and Sears as anchor stores, all three of which were vacant before demolition began in May 2016. Demolition was finished in October 2017. A Dierbergs opened at the site of the demolished mall in March 2023. Decline was first noticeable in the early 2000s, but took off seriously in 2006, when many stores started to close. The announcement the Dillard's would close in August 2007 was critical, because it was the most popular store. Two years later, Macy's closed, which was considered the ultimate dagger. It was by then assumed that Crestwood Mall was not going to be around much longer, and that became official in September 2013, when the exterior LensCrafters closed.

== History ==
Crestwood Plaza was the first regional mall in the St. Louis metropolitan area. Local retail developers Louis and Milton Zorensky developed the mall in 1957. Its original anchor stores included local department store Scruggs, Vandervoort and Barney (later Famous-Barr, then Macy's) and Sears, making one of the first major malls to have more than one anchor store, and the first to utilize a split-level parking lot to allow direct access to both floors of the anchors. The Zorenskys later developed a second St. Louis mall, Northwest Plaza, which opened in 1963.

In 1967, Crestwood was expanded, adding Stix Baer & Fuller (later Dillard's) as a third anchor.

The mall was the subject of a 1975 lawsuit related to a Kroger supermarket that formerly operated within it. The suit was filed after Kroger moved to a new store across the street in 1972 and subleased its space in the mall to Tipton Electronics. Mall owners wanted to terminate the lease with Kroger, but Kroger wanted to maintain the sub-lease. The suit ruled in Kroger's favor.

Originally an open-air mall, Crestwood Plaza was enclosed in 1984. A Woolworth store at the mall closed in 1988, and was replaced by 18 smaller stores a year later.

Westfield Group purchased Crestwood Plaza in 1998 and renamed it Westfield Shoppingtown Crestwood. The company sold two other St. Louis-area malls to CBL & Associates Properties in 2007, but did not include Crestwood in the sale. It had previously attempted to sell the mall to Somera Capital Management in 2006, but the deal was not completed. Also in 2007, Dillard's closed its store in the mall due to decreased sales. They never had another anchor store to fill that space. Famous-Barr had also announced plans to relocate to a new outdoor mall in Sunset Hills, but remained at Crestwood after the Sunset Hills development was canceled. In 2008, the mall was sold to Centrum Properties and renamed Crestwood Court. Famous-Barr became a Macy's in 2006, and closed in 2009, leaving Sears as the last remaining anchor store.

The loss of anchor stores resulted in increasing vacancies throughout Crestwood Court. Although Centrum initially planned to redevelop the center as a lifestyle center, it filled more than half of the mall with art-oriented tenants, such as art galleries and dance studios. Sears closed in April 2012 due to declining sales. As of late 2012, the only remaining tenant was a LensCrafters. The mall concourses were officially closed off on July 11, 2013, leaving only LensCrafters, which had an exterior entrance. On September 16, 2013, LensCrafters closed, leaving the mall completely vacant.

== Redevelopment ==
In Summer 2013, proposed redevelopment hit a snag when the Crestwood board of aldermen refused to take the bid from the redeveloper, Centrum Properties, and the project was considered abandoned. The property at that point was entirely vacant. In April 2014 Urban Street paid $3.6 million for the Crestwood Court during an online auction. For comparison, the previous owner Centrum Properties paid $17.5 million when it purchased the 47 acre property in 2008. Centrum's redevelopment plans were stopped when Crestwood aldermen refused to offer public tax incentives for the project.

Of this interaction, Centrum Properties partner Sol Barket said, "The city of Crestwood is one of the finest communities in St. Louis, with wonderful people and some of the best demographics in the entire region. Although things may have gotten heated..., Mayor Jeff Schlink has been nothing but a pleasure to work with, and the aldermen, all good people, simply have different views and opinions of how the mall should be redeveloped."

In 2014, UrbanStreet purchased the Crestwood Court property, which, at that point, had sat vacant for a year. On April 15, 2015, the City of Crestwood released the initial proposal it received from UrbanStreet for the site. That proposal suggested mixed-use of retail and residential use, including open space and community gardens, entertainment, and service retail

So far, the City of Crestwood has moved forward in approving UrbanStreet as the developer for the property and has stated its intent to hold public meetings about that redevelopment. Crestwood Aldermen have called this step "completely procedural." The Lindbergh School District, which serves the City of Crestwood, has announced its opposition to the use of Tax Increment Financing for any component of a redevelopment that includes residential uses.

By October 2017, Crestwood Court was completely demolished. A well respected St. Louis Area Planning Consultant recently told a gathering of the City of Crestwood's "Economic Development" Commission that he was "puzzled" by the lack of progress. Additionally, Crestwood Residents have begun questioning the City's competence regarding the redevelopment process.

In August 2018, Chicago-based firm Urbanstreet decided to plant prairie grass on the site to prevent any further erosion when the proposed $79 million project to include mixed retail, entertainment venues, dining, and housing was suspended as Urbanstreet continued to weigh their options.

On March 28, 2023, a Dierbergs opened on the site of the former mall. As of April 2023 the residential area is under construction.
