= Richard Rovere =

American journalist

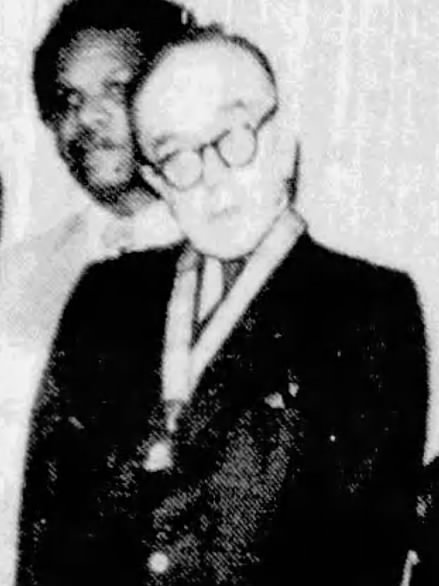
Rovere (center) in 1977

Richard Halworth Rovere (May 5, 1915 – November 23, 1979) was an American political journalist.

== Biography ==
Rovere was born in Jersey City, New Jersey. He graduated from the Stony Brook School in 1933 and Bard College, then a branch of Columbia University, in 1937. During the Great Depression, he was attracted to Communism, may or may not have joined the Party, and wrote for the New Masses. In 1939, as a result of the Nazi-Soviet Pact, he broke with Stalinism and became an anticommunist liberal.

In the early 1940s, he was an assistant editor at The Nation. He joined The New Yorker in 1944 and wrote its "Letter from Washington" column from December 1948 until his death. Throughout the 1940s and 1950s, he periodically contributed to Esquire, Harper's, and The American Scholar; now and then he reported on American matters for Britain's Spectator. His reporting got him on the master list of Nixon political opponents.

Rovere wrote an introduction to Edward Jay Epstein's book Inquest: The Warren Commission and the Establishment of Truth (1966), which was critical of the Warren Commission.

He died of emphysema in Poughkeepsie, New York.

== Blurbs ==
From the Rhinebeck Gazette (Rhinebeck, New York), June 18, 1959:

The Gazette received an advanced copy of Richard H. Rovere's book, "Senator Joe McCarthy," from Harcourt, Brace and Company, Inc. The book is both an analytical biography and a memoir, as well as a commentary on the American political scene. Mr Rovere, who was often an eyewitness observer of the events he describes, lives at 108 Montgomery Street in Rhinebeck.

== Legacy ==
His papers from 1931 to 1968 are housed at the Wisconsin Historical Society Archives.

== Bibliography ==
=== Books ===
- Howe & Hummel: Their True and Scandalous History (1947). Paperback reprint: The Weeper and the Blackmailer (1950)
- The General and the President (with Arthur M. Schlesinger, Jr., 1951)
- Affairs of State: The Eisenhower Years (1956)
- Senator Joe McCarthy (1959)
- The American Establishment and Other Reports, Opinions, and Speculations (1962)
- The Goldwater Caper (1965)
- Waist Deep in the Big Muddy: Personal Reflections on 1968 (1968)
- Arrivals and Departures: A Journalist's Memoirs (1976)
- Final Reports: Personal Reflections on Politics and History in Our Time (1984, published posthumously, foreword by Arthur M. Schlesinger, Jr.)

=== Essays and reporting ===
- Rovere, Richard H. (February 4, 1950). "Wallace". The New Yorker. 25 (50): 27–32. (Note: Reminiscences of school days.)
- Introduction to Epstein, Edward Jay (1966). Inquest: The Warren Commission and the Establishment of Truth. New York: Viking Press. OCLC 391774.

———————
