= Edward Jay Epstein =

American investigative journalist (1935–2024)

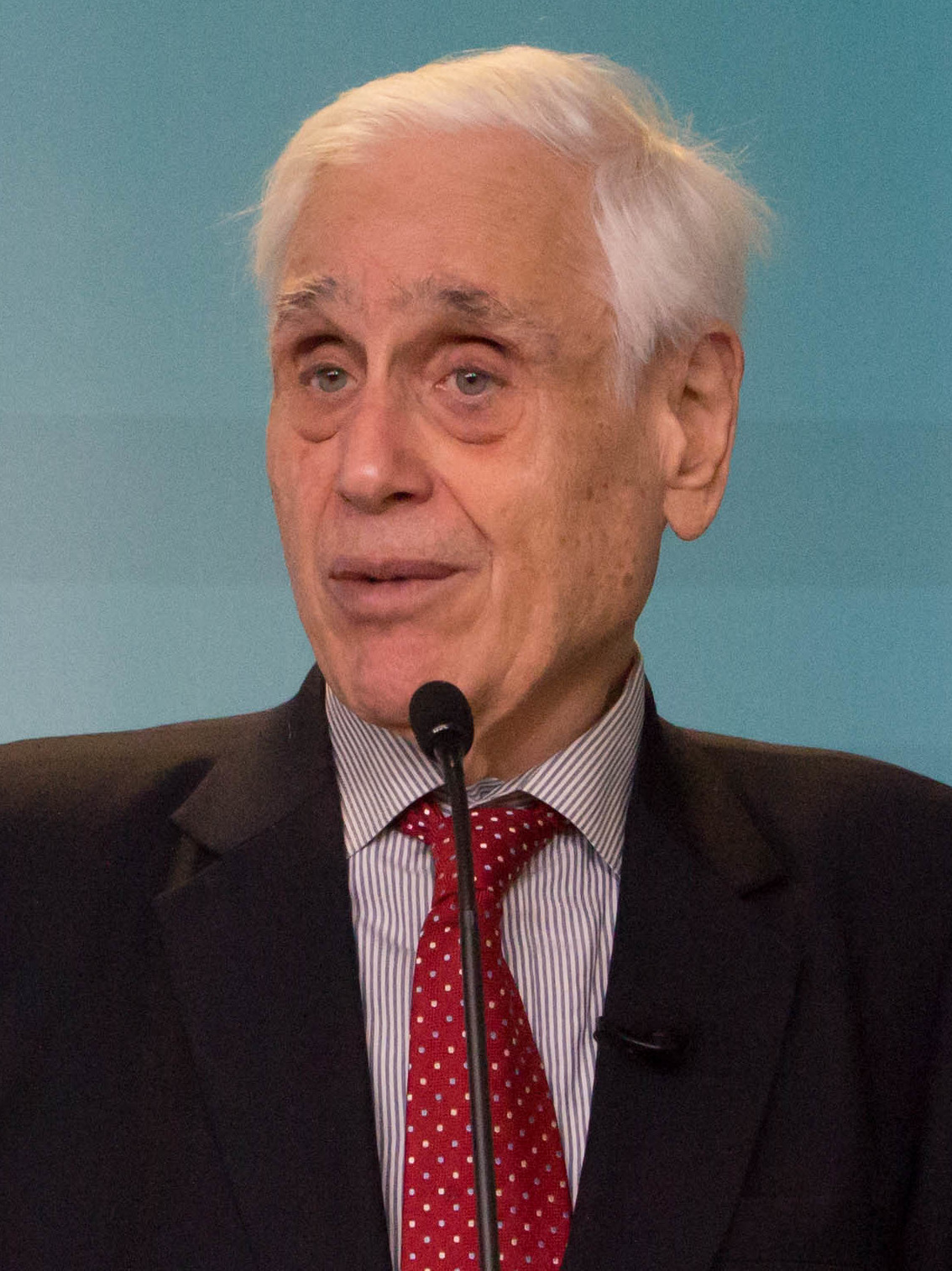
- Epstein in 2017
- Born: December 6, 1935; New York City, U.S.
- Died: January 9, 2024 (aged 88); New York City, U.S.

Academic background
- Education: Cornell University (BA, MA); Harvard University (PhD)

Academic work
- Discipline: Government; Political science; Journalism
- Institutions: Harvard University; University of California, Los Angeles; Massachusetts Institute of Technology

Edward Jay Epstein (December 6, 1935 – January 9, 2024) was an American investigative journalist and a political science professor at Harvard University, the University of California, Los Angeles, and the Massachusetts Institute of Technology.

== Early life and education ==
Edward Epstein was born in New York City on December 6, 1935. He earned a Bachelor of Arts and Master of Arts in government from Cornell University. One of his professors at Cornell was Vladimir Nabokov. In 1973, he received his PhD in government from Harvard University.

== Career ==
Epstein taught courses at Harvard University, the University of California, Los Angeles, and the Massachusetts Institute of Technology for three years. While a graduate student at Cornell University in 1966, he published the book Inquest: The Warren Commission and the Establishment of Truth, an influential critique of the Warren Commission probe into the John F. Kennedy assassination. It featured an introduction by Richard Rovere. After leaving teaching, Epstein decided to pursue his writing career back in New York City.

Epstein wrote three books about the Kennedy assassination, eventually collected in The Assassination Chronicles: Inquest, Counterplot, and Legend (1992). His books Legend (1978) and Deception (1989) drew on interviews with retired CIA Counterintelligence Chief James Jesus Angleton, and his 1982 book The Rise and Fall of Diamonds was an exposé of the diamond industry and its economic impact in southern Africa.

In "Have You Ever Tried to Sell a Diamond?" (1982), Edward Jay Epstein detailed the heavy marketing strategy used by the diamond company De Beers to turn tiny rocks of transparent crystallized carbon into highly demanded, high-priced mass market items. In his 1996 book Dossier: The Secret History of Armand Hammer, the author revealed, among other things, how the prolific businessman laundered money to finance espionage for the Soviets in the 1920s and 1930s.

In 2017, Epstein was the subject of a documentary, Hall of Mirrors, directed by the sisters Ena and Ines Talakic, and which premiered at the 55th New York Film Festival. This covered his most notable articles and books, including close looks at the findings of the Warren Commission, the structure of the diamond industry, the strange career of Armand Hammer, and the inner workings of big-time journalism itself. These were interwoven with an in-progress investigation into the circumstances around Edward Snowden's 2013 leak of classified documents, resulting in Epstein's book How America Lost Its Secrets: Edward Snowden, the Man and the Theft.

Despite claims of both the documentary and the book affirming that Snowden was a Russian spy, neither did so. On the contrary, Epstein concludes in his book that there is no evidence Snowden was employed by the Russian intelligence service while in the United States. What he said in his book was that Snowden, a former civilian contractor at the National Security Agency, as the House Permanent Select Committee on Intelligence unanimously confirmed in its December 2016 report, removed digital copies of 1.5 million classified files from the NSA. Epstein also said that Snowden went to Hong Kong, where he secretly contacted Russian government officials, which Vladimir Putin revealed in a September 3, 2013, televised press conference, and that the House Intelligence Committee found, based on its access to U.S. intelligence, that "[s]ince Snowden's arrival in Moscow [on June 23, 2013], he has had, and continues to have, contact with Russian intelligence services", a conclusion that Epstein confirmed with Representative Adam Schiff, the committee's ranked Democrat, and Representative Mike Rogers, its ranking Republican; all the Democrats as well as Republicans signed the report. The fact that a defector to Moscow had contact between 2013 and 2016 with an adversary's intelligence service does not make him a spy, and therefore Epstein never claimed that Snowden was a spy in the film Hall of Mirrors or in his book. Nonetheless, he said, "Other whistleblowers have gone to their respective service's inspector general with their concerns; by contrast, Snowden 'got in touch with' agents of the Russian government."

== Death ==
Epstein died from COVID-19 at his apartment in Manhattan, New York City, on January 9, 2024, at the age of 88.

== Connection with Jeffrey Epstein ==
Epstein wrote that he first met Jeffrey Epstein in 1987 at a party. Jeffrey Epstein upgraded his flight tickets, let him stay at his properties, and introduced him to others. By early 1989, Epstein became aware of multiple instances of what he believed were fraud and other instances of legal market manipulation, and he wrote an article titled "The Win-Win Game" about this in a column for Manhattan, inc. He did not name Jeffrey Epstein in the article but identified him as a grifter and fabulist, and Jeffrey Epstein stopped speaking with him after its publication.

According to Edward Epstein, Jules Kroll sent an investigator to ask him about Jeffrey Epstein in 1996 as part of an investigation they were conducting for Les Wexner's L Brands. Kroll's investigators had already determined that Jeffrey Epstein was a former Brooklyn roofer with a faked resume.

Twenty-four years later, Jeffrey Epstein contacted Epstein again, inviting him to tea to discuss an article Epstein wrote about Vladimir Nabokov, and an artificial intelligence project named Sophia that Jeffrey Epstein's purported "robot team" was working on.

The January 30, 2025, release of the Epstein files concerning Jeffrey Epstein contained over 100 emails (otherwise unverified) to, from, or regarding Edward Epstein. In some of the released e-mails, Edward Epstein was shown to have messaged Ghislaine Maxwell, inviting her to a "Shadow Commission on 9/11" and linking his personal website where he investigated the September 11 terrorist attacks, which Maxwell declined.

Similarly, in another released e-mail conversation between Ghislaine Maxwell and Philip Levine (a businessman known to have been close to Jeffrey Epstein) that took place in September 18, 2001, a week after the terrorist attacks, and which went viral, Maxwell discusses having landed in Santa Monica, California, on a helicopter; to which Levine jokingly replies: "Where's the real pilot?"

== Published work ==
- Inquest: The Warren Commission and the Establishment of Truth. New York: Viking Press. 1966. OCLC 391774.
- Counterplot. New York: Viking Press. 1969. OCLC 4405.
- News from Nowhere: Television and the News. New York: Random House. 1973. ISBN 9780394463162. OCLC 495180.
- Between Fact and Fiction: The Problem of Journalism. New York: Vintage Books. 1975. ISBN 9780394713960. OCLC 1500255.
- Legend: The Secret World of Lee Harvey Oswald. New York: Reader's Digest Press. 1978. ISBN 9780070195394. OCLC 3516389.
- Cartel. New York: Berkley Books. 1980 [1978]. ISBN 9780425044803. OCLC 11966305.
- The Rise and Fall of Diamonds: The Shattering of a Brilliant Illusion. New York: Simon and Schuster. 1982. ISBN 9780671412890. OCLC 8169228.
- Deception: The Invisible War Between the KGB & the CIA. New York: Simon and Schuster. 1989. ISBN 9780671415433. OCLC 19127470.
- Agency of Fear: Opiates and Political Power in America (Revised ed.). London: Verso. 1990. ISBN 9780860915294. OCLC 22277989.
- The Assassination Chronicles: Inquest, Counterplot, and Legend. New York: Carroll & Graf. 1992. ISBN 9780881849097. OCLC 26751242.
- Dossier: The Secret History of Armand Hammer. New York: Random House. 1996. ISBN 9780679448020. OCLC 33441238.
- The Big Picture: The New Logic of Money and Power in Hollywood. New York: Random House. 2005. ISBN 9781400063536. OCLC 55625186.
- The Hollywood Economist: The Hidden Financial Reality Behind the Movies (2nd ed.). Brooklyn: Melville House. 2012. ISBN 9781612190501. OCLC 721886872.
- Three Days in May: Sex, Surveillance, and DSK. Brooklyn: Melville House. 2012. ISBN 9781612191966. OCLC 801545032.
- The Annals of Unsolved Crime. Brooklyn: Melville House. 2013. ISBN 9781612190488. OCLC 821701850.
- The JFK Assassination Diary: My Search for Answers to the Mystery of the Century. EJE Publication. 2013. ISBN 9781492831501. OCLC 865582282.
- How America Lost Its Secrets: Snowden, the Man and the Theft. New York: Alfred A. Knopf. 2017. ISBN 9780451494566. OCLC 952546865.
- Assume Nothing: Encounters with Assassins, Spies, Presidents, and Would-Be Masters of the Universe. New York: Encounter Books. 2023. ISBN 9781641772945. OCLC 1641772948.
