= Pocket Testament League =

Christian organization

The Pocket Testament League is a Christian nonprofit organization which distributes printed copies of the Gospels from the New Testament.

== History ==
The Pocket Testament League was founded in 1893 by a 12-year-old named Helen Cadbury, daughter of the president of the confectioner Cadbury, who wished to introduce her classmates to Christianity. She formed a group with her Christian schoolfriends, “The Pocket Testament League.”

In 1904, Helen married American evangelist Charles McCallon Alexander, who officially organized the league with Dr. J. Wilbur Chapman in Philadelphia in March 1908. Alexander had been associated with the prominent evangelist Dwight L. Moody, and his experience in worldwide evangelism gave a huge impetus to the League. In 1914, The Pocket Testament League opened an office in London and began sharing gospels as part of its First World War outreach. In October, one of their campaigns gave out 400,000 New Testaments to soldiers on Salisbury Plain.

During the Great Depression, members of the League shared Gospels through the Civilian Conservation Corps in the South and throughout New England. Billy Graham encouraged the League, commenting that "I am completely sold on the work of The Pocket Testament League, and continue to pray for those associated with it."

Many people heard the story of a pocket sized Bible in a soldier's pocket that saved his life. It was Private Jennison of the 5th Yorkshire Regiment who, during WWI, was carrying his New Testament supplied by The Pocket Testament League which stopped the bullet that would have pierced his chest.

After WWII, General MacArthur asked the league for Pocket Testaments. Members of league contributed 11 million Gospels for the nation of Japan. As a result of these Gospels being shared in Japan, Captain Fuchida Mitsuo, who had led the attack on Pearl Harbor, later became a Christian and worked for The League.

After WWII, the league started missionary work in foreign countries. With the support of Generals George Marshall and Chiang Kai-shek, Bibles were distributed among Chinese soldiers fighting in the Chinese Civil War.

== Present ==
The League has over 450,000 members and a staff of 5 full-time people that work from virtual offices. A small team runs the ministry and it is managed by a 15-person board of trustees. The League has members from all 50 U.S. states and from 140 countries.

The League is based in Lititz, Pennsylvania, US. It is also known as Bridge Builders in the UK.

Today, the league still prints small, pocket-sized Gospel of John in languages including English, Simplified Chinese, Traditional Chinese, Italian, Japanese, Russian, German, Spanish and Portuguese, with wide range of cover designs. In 2019 about 16,000 individuals shared 1,150,000 gospels. It also partners with local Bible Societies for accurate Bible translations and ships from several locations around the world and in 2019, 300 partners distributed 6 million gospels.

== See also ==
- Gideons International
