= Frank E. Gaebelein =

American educator and author (1899 – 1983)

- Gaebelein in 1963
- Born: March 31, 1899; Mount Vernon, New York
- Died: January 19, 1983 (aged 83); Rochester, Minnesota
- Occupations: evangelical educator, author, and editor
- Known for: general editor for the 12-volume Expositor's Bible Commentary

Frank Ely Gaebelein (March 31, 1899 – January 19, 1983) was an American evangelical educator, author, and editor who was the founding headmaster of The Stony Brook School in Long Island, New York. He is the author of more than twenty books, and also served as editor for Our Hope (which later merged with Eternity), Christianity Today, and Eternity magazines, style editor for the translation committee of the New International Version of the Bible, and general editor for the 12-volume Expositor's Bible Commentary.

== Early life and education ==
Gaebelein was born in Mount Vernon, New York, the youngest of three sons, to German immigrants Arno Clemens Gaebelein and Emma Fredericka (née Grimm) Gaebelein. His father was a noted preacher and outspoken early leader of the dispensationalist and fundamentalist movements. Frank graduated from Mount Vernon High School, where he was editor of the yearbook with E. B. White (later contributor to The New Yorker magazine and author of Charlotte's Web and Stuart Little). He earned his B.A. from New York University (1920), where he was the piano soloist performing with the University Glee Club. Gaebelein's studies were interrupted briefly in 1918 to serve in the U.S. Army, where he was commissioned as a Second Lieutenant. He earned his A.M. from Harvard University (1921), where he studied English and comparative literature. In 1923, Gaebelein married Dorothy Laura (née Medd), with whom he had three children: Dorothy Laura G. Hampton, Donn Medd, and Gretchen Elizabeth Gaebelein Hull (who later gave birth to artist Jeff Hull (1955), Dr. Rev. Sanford Hull (1956), and Meredyth Hull Smith (1957)).

== Career ==
Shortly after graduating from Harvard in the spring of 1921, Gaebelein was approached by John F. Carson and Ford C. Ottman to be the headmaster of The Stony Brook School, which was an outgrowth of the Stony Brook Assembly. Frank Gaebelein began organizing The Stony Brook School, which opened in the fall of 1922. He held the position of headmaster for more than four decades. During this time, he also served as an ordained deacon and presbyter at the Reformed Episcopal Church. In 1954 he served as vice-chairman for Oxford University Press's preparation of the New Scofield Reference Bible. Toward the end of his tenure at Stony Brook, Gaebelein and the school came under pressure from fundamentalists because of their embracing "new evangelicalism". One of the leaders of this movement, Harold Ockenga, invited Gaebelein to be the dean of the newly founded Fuller Theological Seminary, an offer he considered but ultimately declined. Gaebelein served on the executive committee of evangelist Billy Graham's famous sixteen-week crusade at Madison Square Garden in 1957. Following the close of the crusade in September, Graham visited Stony Brook and spoke to a crowd of 6,000 on the campus. It was due to this that the Stony Brook Assembly ceased its summer conferences, which had been conducted on the campus since 1909.

After retiring from Stony Brook in 1963, Gaebelein joined Carl F. H. Henry as co-editor of Christianity Today. While covering the 1965 Selma to Montgomery marches during the Civil Rights Movement, he was criticized for abandoning his role as a reporter and joining as a protester. In 1968 he served as style committee chairman for the New International Version of the Bible. From 1969 to 1972, Gaebelein was director of the faculty summer seminar on faith and learning at Wheaton College of Illinois. In 1971, he took on the role as general editor for the Expositor's Bible Commentary, an endeavor he continued until his death (supervising, in order of publication, volumes 10, 11, 1, 9, and 12).

== Death and legacy ==
In October 1982, Gaebelein attended the dedication of the Frank E. Gaebelein Hall at The Stony Brook School. In November 1982, he underwent a double bypass surgery, and never fully recovered. Gaebelein died two months later at the Mayo Clinic in Rochester, Minnesota.

== Published works ==
- Down Through the Ages: The Story of the King James Bible (1924)
- A Brief Survey of Scripture (1929)
- Exploring the Bible: a study of background and principles (1929)
- The Hollow Queen (1933)
- Facing the Fact of Inspiration (1933)
- From a Headmaster's Study (1935)
- Philemon: The gospel of Emancipation: A Narrative and Devotional Commentary (1939)
- Looking Unto Him: A Message for Each Day (1941)
- The Christian Use of the Bible (1946)
- The Servant and the Dove: Obadiah and Jonah, Their Messages and Their Work (1946)
- The Meaning of Inspiration (1950)
- The Story of the King James Bible (1950)
- "Rutherford Today" in Samuel Rutherford, 1600-1661 (1950)
- Christian Education in a Democracy (1951)
- The Pattern of God's Truth (1954)
- The Practical Epistle of James: Studies in Applied Christianity (1955)
- "The Bible College in American Education" School and Society, 87, 223 (1959)
- The Story of the Scofield Reference Bible, 1909-1959 (1959)
- Commitment and the School Community (Ed.) (1960)
- Toward a Philosophy of Christian Education: An Introduction to Evangelical Christian Education (Ed.) (1964)
- A Christianity Today Reader (1966)
- A Varied Harvest: Out of a Teacher's Life and Thought: A collection of Essays (1967)
- The New Scofield Reference Bible: Its Background and Making (1967)
- Christianity Today (Ed.) (1968)
- The Pattern of God's Truth: Problems of Integration in Christian Education (1968)
- Faith That Lives: From the Practical Epistle of James (1969)
- Four Minor Prophets, Obadiah, Jonah, Habakkuk, and Haggai: Their Message for Today (1970)
- From Day to Day: A Message from the Bible for Each Day of the Year (1975)
- The Expositor's Bible Commentary (1976–1992)
- The Christian, the Arts, and Truth: Regaining the Vision of Greatness (1985)
- "What is Truth in Art?" in The Christian Imagination: Essays on Literature and the Arts (1986)
