= The Syndicate (building) =

- Century Building and Syndicate Trust Building
- U.S. National Register of Historic Places
- St. Louis Landmark
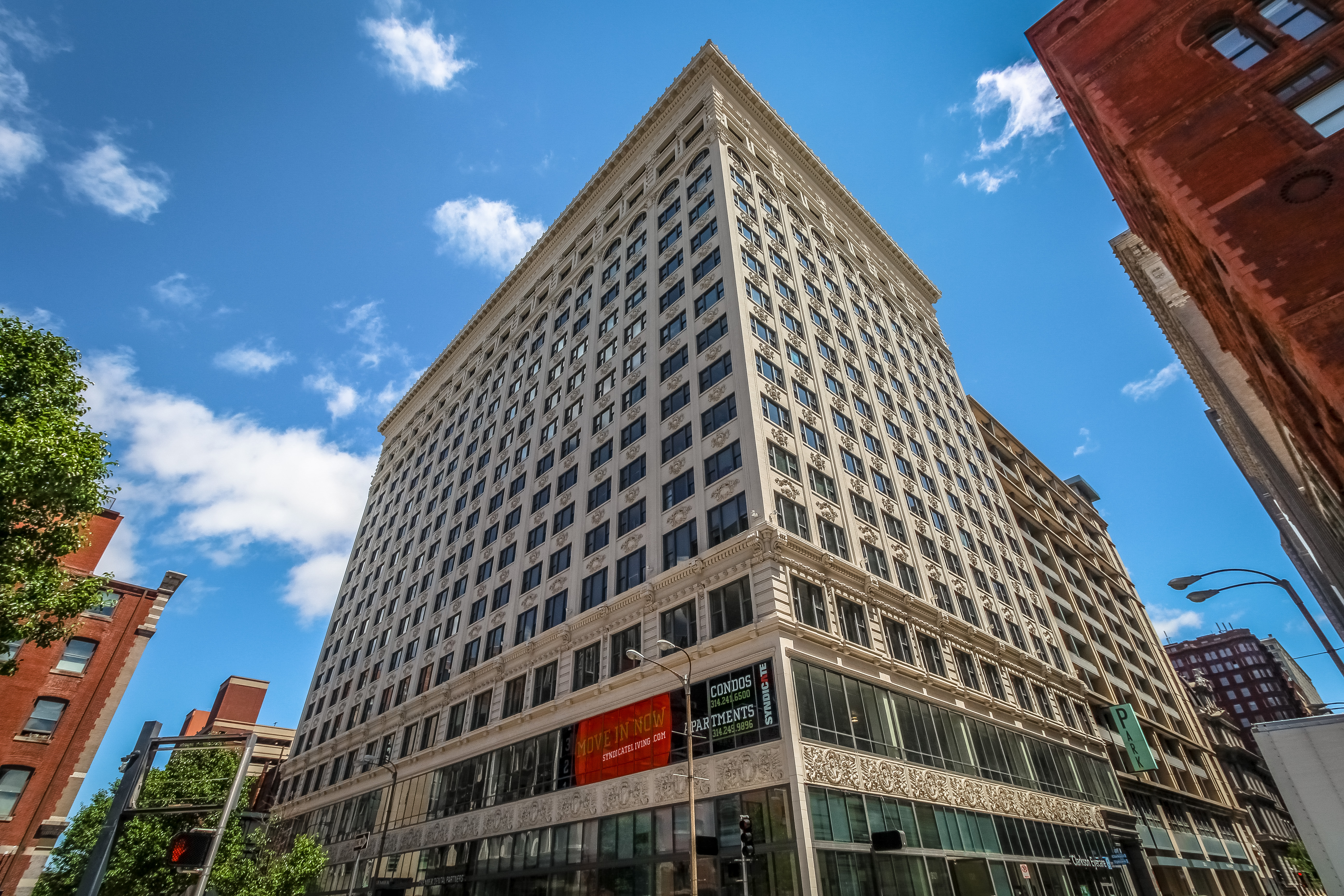

- Location within St. Louis Location within Missouri Location within the United States
- Location: 915 Olive St, St. Louis, Missouri
- Coordinates: 38.6294°N 90.1941°W
- NRHP reference No.: 02001054
- Added to NRHP: 10/16/2002

The Syndicate, built in 1907, is a building that has stood as a historic landmark in downtown St. Louis, Missouri. The detailed Terracotta ornamentation still stands out as a significant glimpse into the style of an earlier time.

The building declined in the 1950s and 1960s and became vacant in 1967 after the Scruggs Vandervoort & Barney department store closed in 1967. After a city request for renovation, and the demolition of its long standing neighbor, the Century Building, The Syndicate was reconstructed between 2006 and 2008 to hold luxury condos in a mixed use project. It holds 94 condominiums, 84 apartments, street level retail, and parking on the basement and first two floors.

The Syndicate Trust Building was added to the National Register of Historic Places in 2002.
