= Christian Friedrich Witt =

German composer, music editor and teacher (1660–1716)

Christian Friedrich Witt, or Witte (c. 1660 – 13 April 1716) was a German composer, music editor and teacher.

== Biography ==
Christian Friedrich Witt was born in Altenburg, where his father, Johann Ernst Witt, was court organist; he had come from Denmark around 1650 when a Danish princess married into the house of Saxe-Altenburg. Frederick I, Duke of Saxe-Gotha-Altenburg probably gave Witt a scholarship in 1676 to study in Vienna and Salzburg, and then from 1685–1686 to study composition and counterpoint in Nuremberg with Georg Caspar Wecker, returning for a further period of study in 1688. He moved to Gotha to take up a post as chamber organist to the court in June 1686; he remained there for the rest of his life. He became a substitute for W.M. Mylius, the kapellmeister, in 1694, and succeeded him after his death in 1713; Duke Frederick II was one of his pupils. He is mentioned as a good keyboard player and kapellmeister in J.P. Treiber's Der accurate Organist im General-Bass (1704) and Telemann's Beschreibung der Augen-Orgel (1739). He was also valued by the courts of Ansbach-Bayreuth, Schwarzburg-Rudolstadt, and Saxe-Weissenfels. While on Witt's deathbed, Johann Sebastian Bach was commissioned to substitute for him and perform a Passiontide work for the court chapel (the Weimarer Passion BWV deest (BC D 1)).

== Compositions ==
=== Vocal ===
His cantatas feature instrumental introductions, vocal concerto movements, solos, duets, homophonic chorale choruses, and are without recitatives. Psalmodia sacra is an important hymnal from the late baroque; Marpurg wrote that it was the best he knew. It contains 762 hymns, 351 with melodies and figured basses, and an appendix of 12 more hymns and five more melodies. There are established chorale melodies by sixteenth and seventeenth century Thuringian composers along with over 100 new ones believed to have been written by Witt.

- 65 cantatas: Rentweinsdorf cycle, for 4 voices, 2 violins, 2 viols, continuo; other instruments include clarion, bassoon, and violone
- 12 cantatas
- Funeral ode: Wer kan des Höchsten Rath, for 5 voices (1697)
- Psalmodia sacra, oder Andächtige und schöne Gesänge: (trans, "Holy Praisings or Devout and Beautiful songs") 356 melodies, of which about 100 are by Witt, for voice and continuo (1715)

=== Orchestral ===
- 3 ouvertures in the French style
- 3 suites, a 4–6
- 7 sonatas, a 4–7, 10 - in an Italian concerto grosso style, including a 3-part concertino
- 3 marches, a 4, ed. P. Rubardt (Kassel, 1954); ed. G. Zahn (Zürich, 1992)
- Concerto, for trumpet

=== Keyboard ===
Witt's keyboard works were well known throughout Germany, and in fact appear in many anthologies of the time. One famous example is the inclusion of two of his suites (in C minor and in F-sharp minor) in the so-called Möllersche Handschrift (Möller manuscript), one of two anthologies compiled by Johann Christoph Bach (1671–1721), Johann Sebastian Bach's older brother (to whom he committed various manuscripts that found their way into the anthologies, as well as manuscripts of some of his own early works).

- 6 suites, (1704); selection ed. L. Cerutti and F. Rima (Padua, 1994–1995)
- Canzona, capriccio, chaconne
- Prelude, 2 fugues, menuet
- Passacaglia, for organ, wrongly attributed to Bach as BWV Anh. 182; in J.S. Bach: Werke XLII, ed. E. Naumann (Leipzig, 1894/1947; see Bach Gesellschaft Ausgabe)
- Herr Christ, der einig Gottessohn, chorale prelude for organ; in Das Erbe deutscher Musik, 1st series, IX (1937)
- Nun komm, der Heiden Heiland, chorale prelude for organ; on "Nun komm, der Heiden Heiland" in Der Orgelfreund VIII (Erfurt)
- Praeludium ex D fis Fuga, Fuga ex D en Fuga ex E in "Mylau Tabulaturbuch"
- Ciaconna ex e con Fuga
- Canzona in B en Ciaconna in B in "Schneeberger Orgel - und Klavierbuch"
- 2 Fuga's and a Fughetta.

Many other keyboard works have been lost.

== Sources ==
- Bernd Baselt, Karl-Ernst Bergunder, 'Witt [Witte], Christian Friedrich', Grove Music Online ed. L. Macy (Accessed 2007-06-13), http://www.grovemusic.com/
- D.P. Walker and P. Walker: German Sacred Polyphonic Vocal Music between Schütz and Bach (Warren, Michigan, 1992)
