= New York Interscholastic Athletic Association =

American high school athletic league

The New York Interscholastic Athletic Association, or "Interscholastic League," pioneered the formation of high school leagues, when it was formed in the spring of 1879 to conduct a track and field meet. The league was exclusively composed of private day-school institutions in the New York metropolitan area. Notable members of the league included Berkeley, Cutler, Barnard, Columbia Grammar School, Trinity, and Dwight.

== Sports ==
In 1892, during the winter, Berkeley School conducted the first open indoor-track meet for league members, and in the spring the league introduced baseball as a league competition. In the fall, the league introduced a league championship schedule for football (although some members of the league had played football since at least the fall of 1884). Other sports soon followed, with the adoption of tennis in 1894, ice skating in 1897, ice hockey in 1898, and basketball in 1898. The New York Times devoted almost all its coverage of secondary school sports to the New York Interscholastic League, probably because the sons and daughters of the readers of the paper went to those schools.

== Student involvement ==
The league was organized by the students and they represented their various schools in league meetings. In the various sports, captains directed and coached the teams, and managers handled the schedules, finances, and overall business of the teams. The schoolboy-run league decided on certain issues such as eligibility requirements, such as age limits, which in the league was twenty. In 1894, the League voted on a new constitution and formed a Board of Arbitration to handle disputes. The Board of Arbitration was made up of one faculty member from each school, thus establishing a dual league administration of students and faculty. The Interscholastic League had even prior to that time had worked with adult administrators, forming alliances with such groups as the University Athletic Club and the Knickerbocker Athletic Club, which managed the indoor and outdoor track and field meets in fields and armories. Many of the athletes from the schools belonged to private athletic clubs and regiment armory teams as well, getting their athletic training.

== Collapse of the league ==
The emergence of public high school athletic activity after 1900 and the decline in the importance of private day schools in the metropolitan area meant a shift in power in football and other sports around 1903. The league collapsed in the season of 1903–1904, but the outdoor track meet and baseball continued to be contested among the schools that historically had been members. The newspapers would occasionally recognized football games in subsequent seasons as “Interscholastic” contests. But whereas in the fall of 1902 almost exclusive coverage was devoted to activities of the football teams of the New York Interscholastic League, by 1904 virtually no football coverage on the league appeared in the newspapers. In the last league contest, a track and field meet in 1909, only DelaSalle, Cutler, and Bernard were participants.

== See also ==
- New York State Association of Independent Schools Athletic Association
- New York State Public High School Athletic Association
