= Lars Brownworth =

American podcaster

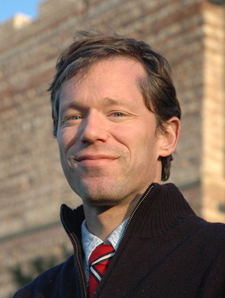
Lars Brownworth in Constantinople

Lars Mehrling Brownworth (born c. 1975) is an American author and U.S. history, political science and humanities teacher at The Stony Brook School in Stony Brook on Long Island, New York, who created the top 50 podcast, 12 Byzantine Rulers: The History of the Byzantine Empire. The podcast was created on a whim by Lars and his brother, Anders Brownworth. He received his undergraduate degree from Houghton University and a MA in Humanities from the University of Dallas.

On August 15, 2007, Brownworth announced that he had resigned from teaching to work on a book with Crown Publishing titled Lost to the West: The Forgotten Byzantine Empire that Rescued Western Civilization, which was published on September 15, 2009. On January 3, 2014, Brownworth released his second book, The Normans: From Raiders to Kings. His third book, titled The Sea Wolves: A History of the Vikings, was published in December 2014. A fourth book, In Distant Lands: A Short History of the Crusades, was released on April 10, 2017. His most recent book, The Caesars Volume 1: Julius Caesar - Roman Colossus, was released on January 11, 2021. It is half of a planned two-volume set which will trace the history of the murderous Julio-Claudian Dynasty. All of his previous books reached the New York Times Best Seller Lists. He made his television debut in the Netflix series Rise of Empires: Ottomans, released in 2020.

He has been interviewed by The New York Times and NPR's "Here and Now", and has written for The Wall Street Journal. He resides in Stony Brook, New York, with his wife, the former Catherine Tipmore. He previously served as the chair of the history department at Washington Christian Academy in Olney, Maryland.

== Influence ==
Brownworth is often seen as a pioneer of history podcasting, with his 12 Byzantine Rulers being a direct impetus for The History of Rome podcast.
