= Rowland Prichard =

Welsh musician (1811–1887)

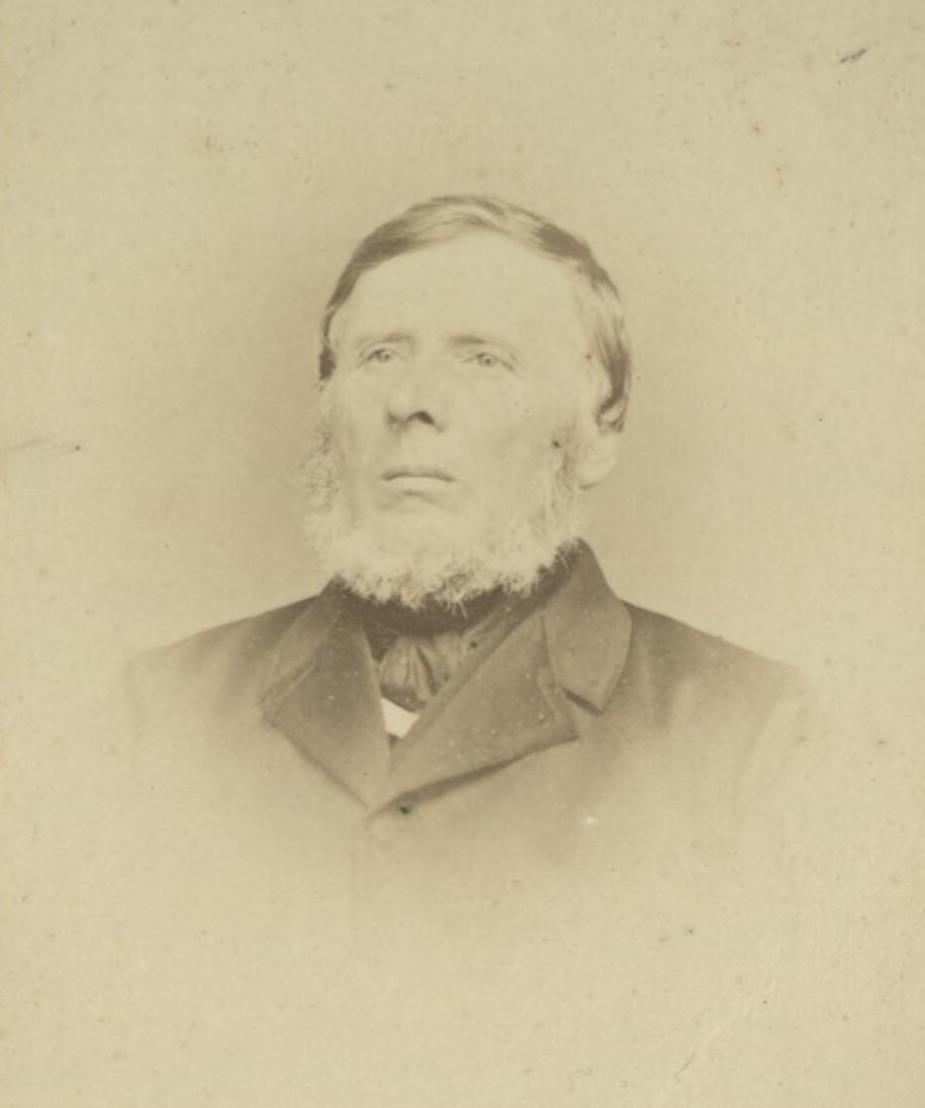
Portrait of Rowland Prichard

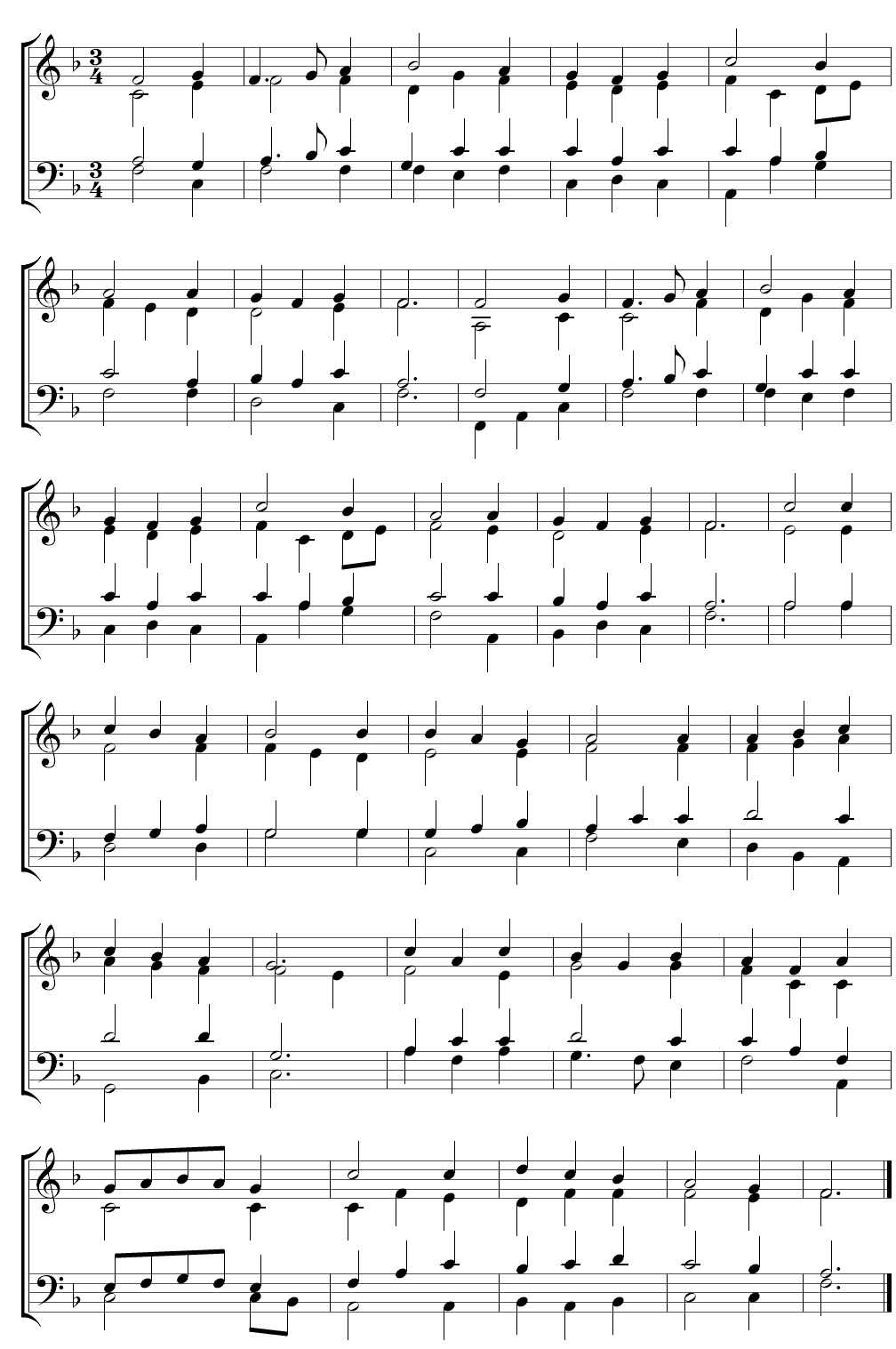
Hyfrydol

Rowland Huw Prichard (alt Rowland Hugh Pritchard) (14 January 1811 – 25 January 1887) was a Welsh musician. A native of Graienyn, near Bala, he lived most of his life in the area, serving for a time as a loom tender's assistant in Holywell, where he died. In 1844 Prichard published Cyfaill y Cantorion (The Singer's Friend), a song book intended for children.

Prichard is remembered today as the composer of the hymn tune "Hyfrydol", to which the hymn "Alleluia! Sing to Jesus", with words by William Chatterton Dix is generally sung.

He is buried at Saint Peters Church, Holywell, Flintshire.

== Hymns ==
- Come, Thou Long Expected Jesus
- Ye that know the Lord is gracious

== See also ==
- Cyril Alington
