= John Wilbur Chapman =

American evangelist (1859–1918)

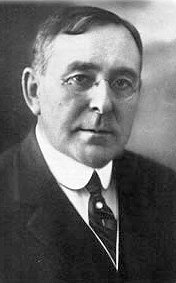
Chapman

John Wilbur Chapman (June 17, 1859, Richmond, Indiana – December 25, 1918, New York City) was a Presbyterian evangelist in the late 19th century who traveled with gospel singer Charles Alexander. His parents were Alexander H. and Lorinda (McWhinney) Chapman.

== Early life and education ==
Chapman grew up attending Quaker Day School and Methodist Sunday School. At age 17, he made a public declaration of his Christian faith and joined the Richmond Presbyterian Church. He received his Bachelor of Arts degree from Lake Forest College and his seminary degree from Lane Theological Seminary in Cincinnati. He completed his ordination into the ministry on April 13, 1881, while still attending Lane. He was later awarded a doctorate in divinity from the College of Wooster and an LL.D. from Heidelberg University.

== Family ==
In May 1882, Chapman married Irene Steddom. In April 1886, they had a daughter, Bertha Irene Chapman. Irene Steddom Chapman died in May 1886. Chapman remarried on November 4, 1888, to Agnes Pruyn Strain; they had four children: Robert (who died in infancy), John Wilbur Jr., Alexander Hamilton, and Agnes Pruyn. His second wife died on June 25, 1907. Chapman married a third and final time on August 30, 1910, to Mabel Cornelia Moulton.

== Ministry ==
Chapman took on several pastorates before shifting to the evangelistic circuit. He began preaching with the legendary D.L. Moody in 1893, and leading many evangelistic events of his own. While not personally responsible for his conversion, Chapman was a strong influence on the ministry of Billy Sunday.

In late 1895, Chapman was appointed Corresponding Secretary of the Presbyterian General Assembly's Committee on Evangelism, overseeing the activities of 51 evangelists in 470 cities. In 1904, Chapman began work on an evangelistic campaign to maximize the efforts of his field evangelists and result in more converts. The testing ground for his theories was in Pittsburgh, which he divided into nine zones in which simultaneous tent meetings would be occurring. Syracuse, New York was the second city in the campaign, meeting with a satisfactory level of success.

In 1905, John H. Converse, a wealthy Presbyterian philanthropist, offered to underwrite Chapman's expenses if he would re-enter the evangelistic field full-time. Converse also set up a trust fund so as to finance Chapman's crusades posthumously. Chapman accepted the offer and in 1907, joined forces with popular gospel singer Charles McCallon Alexander to launch the "Chapman-Alexander Simultaneous Campaign."

The duo assembled an impressive team of evangelists and songleaders and took to the streets. The first joint campaign was held in Philadelphia from March 12 to April 19, 1908. They partitioned the city into 42 sections covered by 21 evangelist-musicians teams. They spent three weeks on each half of the city, resulting in approximately 8000 conversions. It was at a similar Chapman-Alexander event in North Carolina that the legendary King James Only proponent, David Otis Fuller, committed to the Christian faith.

In 1909, Chapman demanded that any field evangelist who doubted the inerrancy of Scripture be removed from ministry. Chapman's biography reports, "The first Chapman-Alexander worldwide campaign left Vancouver, British Columbia on March 26, 1909, and returned on November 26, 1909.

The itinerary included: Melbourne, Sydney, Ipswich, Brisbane, Adelaide, Ballarat, Bendigo, and Townsville in Australia; Manila in the Philippines; Hong Kong, Kowloon, Canton, Shanghai, Hankou, Beijing and Tianjin in China; Seoul, Korea; Kobe, Kyoto, Tokyo, and Yokohama in Japan."

During these years, Chapman was also heavily involved in the promoting of religious summer conferences. He was at one point the director of the Winona Lake Bible Conference in Indiana and also helped to establish bible conferences in Montreat, North Carolina and the Stony Brook Assembly summer conferences on Long Island, founded in 1909. Chapman became heavily involved in the Stony Brook conferences in his later years, seeing that it had the most promise of flourishing because of its close proximity to New York City. After his death, his widow, Mabel Cornelia Moulton, gave to the Stony Brook Assembly the gift of a paved driveway in his memory. Today, 1 Chapman Parkway still serves as the address of The Stony Brook School, which was founded in 1922 as an extension of the summer conferences.

By the end of 1910, Chapman's "mass evangelism" technique was losing favor in evangelistic circles, and Chapman and Alexander were back to large meeting revivals by 1912. The final Chapman-Alexander revival tour was conducted January 6, 1918 to February 13, 1918. In May 1918, Chapman was elected Moderator of the General Assembly of the Presbyterian Church, a position which inundated him with such a high level of stress that he developed a serious enough case of gall stones to need emergency surgery on December 23, 1918, and died two days later, on Christmas Day, aged 59.

== Pastorates ==
- College Corner, Ohio Presbyterian Church, 1882
- Liberty, Indiana Presbyterian Church, 1882
- Dutch Reformed Church (Schuylerville, New York), 1883–1885
- First Reformed Church (Albany, New York), 1885–1890
- Bethany Presbyterian (Philadelphia), 1890–1892, 1896–1899
- Fourth Presbyterian Church (New York City), 1899–1902

== Published works ==
- Ivory Palaces of the King (1893)
- Received Ye the Holy Ghost (Power) (1894)
- And Peter (1895)
- The Lost Crown (1899)
- The Secret of a Happy Day (1899)
- Kadesh-Barnea (or) The Power of a Surrendered Life (1899)
- Spiritual Life of the Sunday School (1899)
- Present Day Parables (1900)
- Revivals and Missions (1900)
- From Life to Life (1900)
- The Life and Work of D.L. Moody (1900)
- Present Day Evangelism (1903)
- Fishing for Men (1904)
- Samuel Hopkins Hadley of Water Street (1906)
- Another Mile (1908)
- The Problem of Work (1911)
- Chapman's Pocket Sermons (1911)
- Revival Sermons (1911)
- The Personal Touch (1912)
- When Home Is Heaven (1917)
- The Minister's Handicap (1918)
- Day After Day (1919)
- Evangelistic Sermons (1922)
- Light on the Way (date unknown)
- The Personal Workers Guide (date unknown)

== Hymnography ==
- "All Hail to the Name" (1914)
- "All in All" (1914)
- "The Full Reward" (1900)
- "God Bless Our Splendid Men" (1916–1917)
- "Hail! All Hail!" (1912)
- "Holy Spirit, Come In" (1894)
- "Jesus, What a Friend for Sinners" (1910) (See "Our Great Savior")
- "The Judgment" (1911)
- "Just to See Jesus" (1910)
- "The Love of the Spirit" (1913)
- "One Day" see also "Glorious Day (Living He Loved Me)" (1910)
- "Our Great Savior (Jesus, What A Friend for Sinners)" (1910)
- "Yield to Him Now (The Savior Has Died to Redeem You)" (1911)
- "'Tis Jesus" (1909)
- "When We Go Home" (1915)
- "Wonderful Grace" (1926)

Religious titles
Preceded by The Rev. John Abner Marquis	Moderator of the 129th General Assembly of the Presbyterian Church in the United States of America; 1918–1919	Succeeded by The Rev. J. Frank Smith
