= Hymnary.org =

Online database of hymns

Hymnary.org is an online database of hymns, hymnodists and hymnals hosted by Calvin University's Calvin Institute of Christian Worship and Christian Classics Ethereal Library. The searchable database contains over one million hymn tunes and texts and incorporates the Dictionary of North American Hymnology. The oldest hymnals in the database are from 1640. The full texts of hymns that are in the public domain are available. The database also contains biographical information on composers and lyricists.

Hymnary.org has received grants from the National Endowment for the Humanities and the Hymn Society in the United States and Canada.

In addition to standard search functions, users have the ability to search for hymns by entering notes of the melody.
