= Arno C. Gaebelein =

American Methodist minister (1861–1945)

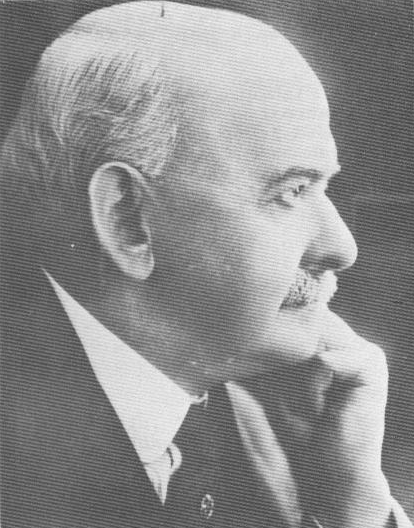
Arno C. Gaebelein.

Arno Clemens Gaebelein (August 27, 1861 – December, 1945) was a Methodist minister in the United States. He was a prominent teacher and conference speaker. He was the father of educator and philosopher of Christian education Frank E. Gaebelein. He edited the journal Our Hope for many years, an outlet of the then-budding Fundamentalist movement in American Christianity.

== Career ==
Being a dispensationalist, he was a developer of the movement in its early days. Two of his books, Revelation, an Analysis and Exposition and Current Events in the Light of the Bible explain the dispensationalist view of eschatology.

Gaebelein did not support the Christian Zionists in their alliance with the World Zionist Organization. In a 1905 speech, he said:

Zionism is not the divinely promised restoration of Israel... Zionism is not the fulfillment of the large number of predictions found in the Old Testament Scriptures, which relates to Israel's return to the land. Indeed, Zionism has very little use of argument from the Word of God. It is rather a political and philanthropic undertaking. Instead of coming together before God, calling upon His name, trusting Him, that He is able to perform what He has so often promised, they speak about their riches, their influence, their Colonial Bank, and court the favor of the Sultan. The great movement is one of unbelief and confidence in themselves instead of God's eternal purposes.

In 1899, Gaebelein left the Methodist Episcopal Church because of complaints of theological liberalism. George Marsden notes that he was one of the early fundamentalist leaders to advocate ecclesiastical separation.

Gaebelein was an advocate of gap creationism. He also was the editor of Our Hope, a Christian periodical, for a number of years, and was an assistant to C. I. Scofield on the Scofield Reference Bible.

Gaebelein had complex views on Jews. He admired Judaism, but also saw the "true" form of Judaism as inherently involving Jesus (akin to the Hebrew Christian movement). George Marsden refers to some of Gaebelein's writing as being anti-Jewish. In the November–December 1896 issue of Our Hope, Gaebelein wrote that "Scriptural – not Talmudic or Rabbinical, still less Reformed – Judaism is as much as divine revelation as Christianity. The canon of the New Testament has no higher Divine authority than has that of the Old. Neither is complete without the other. (...) All he [the Jew] needs is personal, saving faith in his own Jewish Messiah, the Christ of God, nothing more. And all that was Divinely given him through Moses he has full liberty to retain and uphold as far as possible when he becomes a believer in Jesus Christ." David A. Rausch wrote in 1980 that Gaebelein and Our Hope chronicled Nazi anti-Jewish atrocities and the beginnings of the Holocaust quite clearly and directly in the 1937-1945 period, when this information was available and public, yet not widely acknowledged or acted upon. While there were various regrettable passages published suggesting that the persecution would actually all turn out for the better and be a "blessing", Rausch thought the coverage was largely to their credit in retrospect, accurately calling out the possibility of anti-Semitism not just in Germany, but in the United States, and denouncing it.

== Works ==
- Revelation, and Analysis and Exposition
- Current Events in the Light of the Bible
- The Annotated Bible, a commentary on the Old and New Testaments which Gaebelein described as a 'Bible study course'.
- The Harmony of the Prophetic Word, a key to old testament prophecy concerning things to come. (1903)
- The Prophet Daniel (1911)
- The Jewish Question (1912)
- The Book of Genesis: A Complete Analysis of Genesis with Annotations (1912)
- Christ and Glory (1918)
- Studies in Prophecy (1918)
- The Angels Of God (1924)
- The Healing Question (1925)
- The Christ We Know (1927)
- The Conflict of the Ages: The Mystery of Lawlessness: Its Origin, Historic Development and Coming Defeat (1933)
- The History of the Scofield Reference Bible (1943)
- The Prophet Ezekiel: an analytical Exposition (1918)
- Meat In Due Season (nd)
