= Scruggs, Vandervoort and Barney =

American department store

Scruggs, Vandervoort & Barney
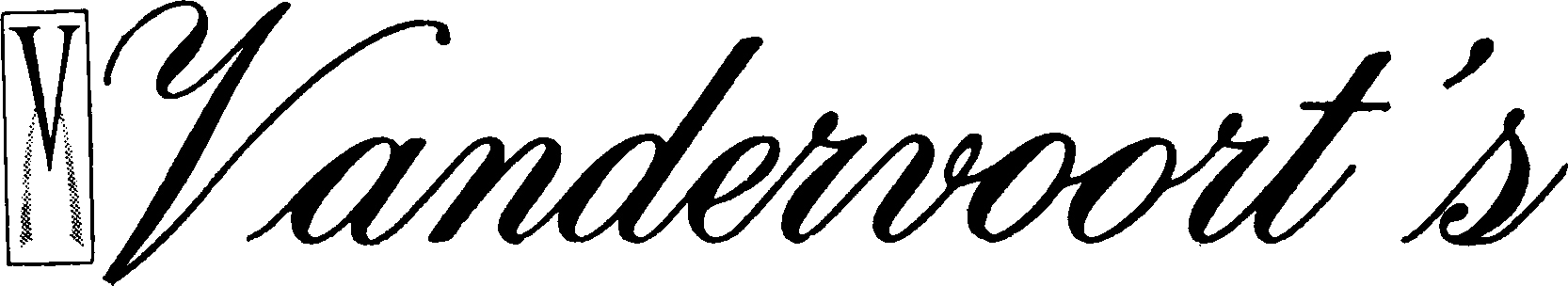
- Industry: Retailing
- Founded: April 1850
- Founder: M.V.L. McClelland, Richard M. Scruggs
- Defunct: 1969; 57 years ago
- Fate: Bankruptcy
- Headquarters: St. Louis, Missouri, U.S.
- Key people: M.V.L. McClelland; Richard M. Scruggs; William L. Vandervoort; Charles E. Barney

Scruggs, Vandervoort & Barney was a department store founded in St. Louis, Missouri in 1850, by M.V.L. McClelland and Richard Scruggs as McClelland, Scruggs & Company. The company started out as a Dry goods store, with the first store opened on North 4th street in downtown St. Louis, later expanding. In 1860, William L. Vandervoort joined the company. Then, in 1870, McClelland retired and Charles E. Barney replaced him in the company.

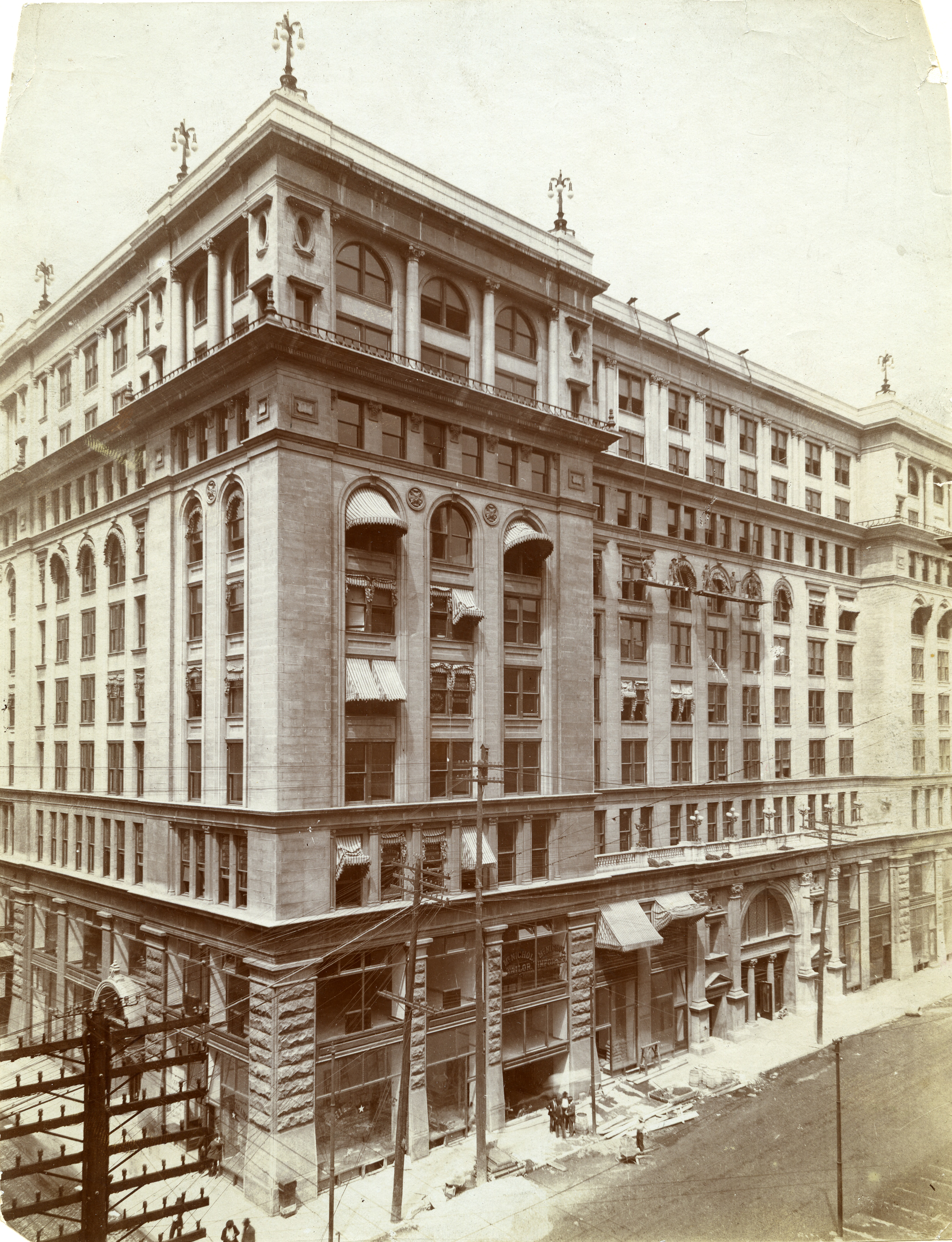
Century Building (Syndicate Trust Building), northwest corner of Ninth and Locust Streets. Photograph by Emil Boehl, 1896.

In 1907, the company moved to The Syndicate at Tenth and Olive streets. Ten years later, they acquired the Mermod Jaccard King Jewelry Company, incorporating themselves into its downtown location. They were well known for holding several varieties of fashion shows. In the 1950s, then known as "Vandervoort's," they opened a branch store in Clayton, Missouri, and, later Crestwood Plaza in Crestwood, Missouri.

Vandervoort's suffered financial pressures and shuttered operations in 1969. The Crestwood Plaza branch would be taken over by Famous-Barr the same year.

Classic logo

== In popular culture ==
- Vandervoort's is referenced in episode 6 of Masters of Sex, which is set in the late 1950s.
