= Charles McCallon Alexander =

American gospel singer

Charles M. Alexander
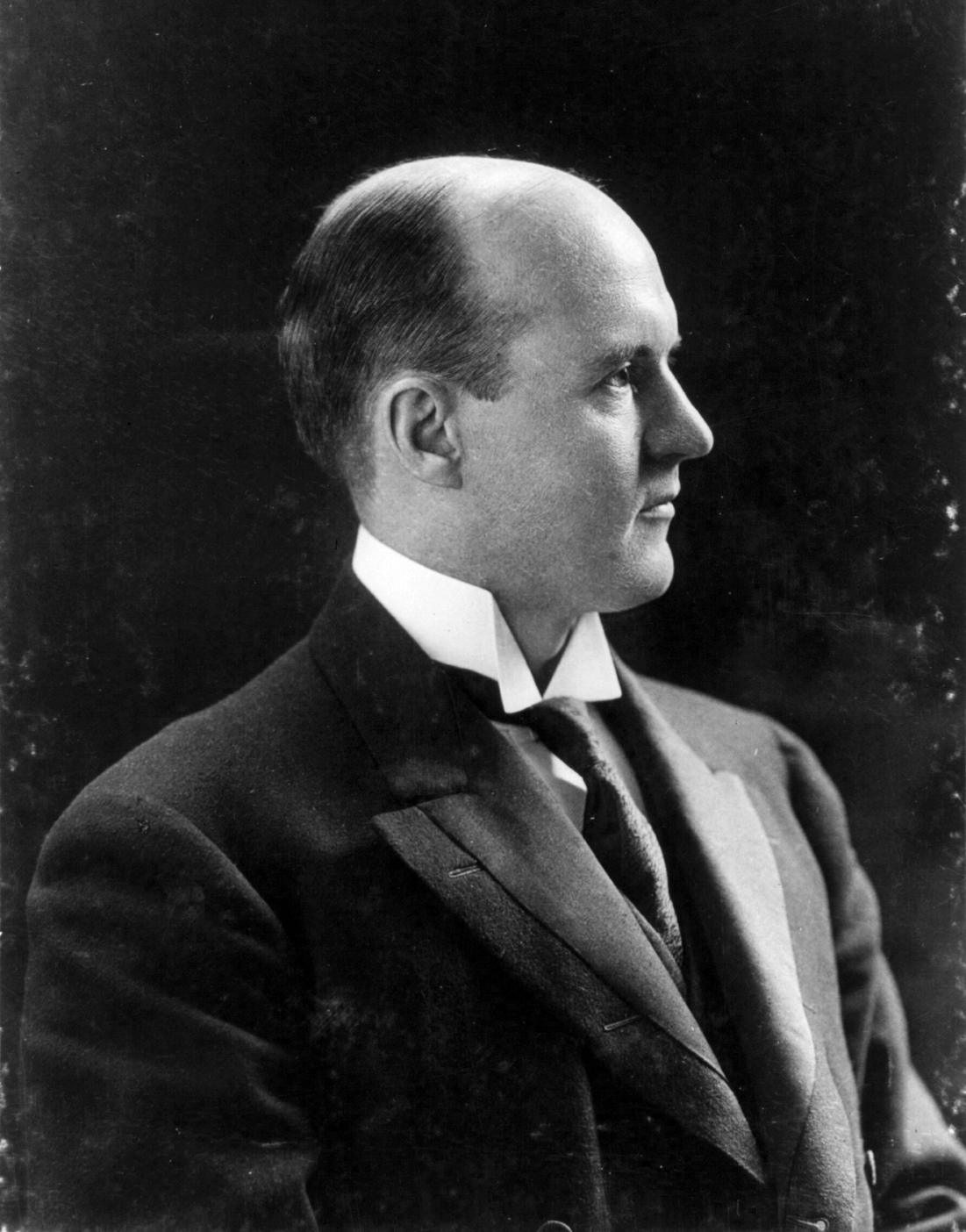

Background information
- Born: 24 October 1867; Tennessee (near Maryville), U.S.
- Died: 13 October 1920 (aged 52) England
- Genres: Gospel
- Occupations: Singer, song leader
- Instrument: Vocals
- Years active: 1895–1918

Charles McCallon Alexander (24 October 1867 – 13 October 1920) a native of East Tennessee, was a popular nineteenth-century gospel singer who worked the evangelistic circuit for many years. Over the course of his ministry, he toured with R. A. Torrey and John Wilbur Chapman, most notably. In 1904, Alexander married Helen Cadbury, daughter of the Cadbury Chocolate Company president. She toured with him on the evangelistic circuit as a women's worker. Together they spread The Pocket Testament League around the world.

Alexander's early Christian influence came from his mother, who was in the habit of reading Dwight L. Moody sermons to the family every night around the fireplace. At an 1880 revival, a thirteen-year-old Charlie Alexander committed to the Christian faith. He attended Moody Bible Institute from 1892 to 1894, after which time he toured with the M. B. Williams revival campaign. In 1902, he joined Dr. R. A. Torrey's Australian tour.

In 1907, Alexander joined forces with evangelist John Wilbur Chapman to launch the "Chapman-Alexander Simultaneous Campaign." The duo assembled an impressive team of evangelists and song leaders and took to the streets. The first joint campaign was held in Philadelphia, Pennsylvania from March 12 to April 19, 1908. They partitioned the city into 42 sections covered by 21 evangelist-musicians teams. They spent three weeks on each half of the city, resulting in approximately 8000 conversions. It was at a similar Chapman-Alexander event eight years later in North Carolina that the legendary King James Only proponent D O Fuller committed to the Christian faith.

Chapman's biography reports, "The first Chapman-Alexander worldwide campaign left Vancouver, British Columbia, on March 26, 1909, and returned November 26. Stops along the way included: Melbourne, Sydney, Ipswich, Brisbane, Adelaide, Ballarat, Bendigo, and Townsville in Australia; Manila in the Philippines; Hong Kong, Kowloon, Canton, Shanghai, Hankow, Peking and Tientsin in China; Seoul, Korea; Kobe, Kyoto, Tokyo, and Yokohama in Japan."

By the end of 1910, Chapman's "mass evangelism" technique was losing favor in evangelistic circles, and Chapman and Alexander were back to large meeting revivals by 1912. The final Chapman-Alexander revival tour was conducted January 6 to February 13, 1918. After the conclusion of that crusade, Alexander retired to England, where he lived out the remaining two years of his life. He died in 1920 in Birmingham, England and was interred in Lodge Hill Cemetery.

Alexander was inducted into the Gospel Music Hall of Fame in 1991.
