= Jonas Hawkins =

American spy during the American Revolution

- Born: August 28, 1752; Stony Brook, New York
- Died: April 24, 1817 (aged 64); Mills Pond, New York
- Occupations: spy; militia officer; innkeeper; postmaster
- Espionage activity
- Allegiance: United States
- Operations: Culper Ring

Jonas Hawkins (August 28, 1752 – April 24, 1817) was an American Patriot and a member of the Culper Spy Ring during the American Revolution.

After the American Revolutionary War, Hawkins was a New York militia officer, tavern owner, innkeeper, and postmaster.

== Family life ==
Jonas Hawkins was the great grandson of Zachriah Hawkins, a founder of Brookhaven, New York. Jonas Hawkins was born and lived in Stony Brook, New York. Stony Brook and Setauket were villages within the town of Brookhaven.

Jonas Hawkins was a son of Eleazer Hawkins, Sr. (1716–91) and Ruth Mills Hawkins (1721–91), who were married in 1739.

Hawkins married Ruth Mills (1748–1840), a woman born 27 years after his mother who had the same maiden name. Their children were Micah, Julia Ann (m. Thomas Shepard Mount, mother of artist William Sidney Mount), Deborah, Ruth, Renelche, William Wickham, Jonathan, Jonas and Dorothy.

== American Revolution ==
Jonas Hawkins signed the Association to sustain the Continental Congress and the Provincial Convention in Brookhaven, Suffolk County, New York, on June 8, 1775, as did his father, Eleazar Hawkins, Sr. Jonas Hawkins was a courier for the Culper Ring during many of its early operations between December 1778 and the summer 1779.

In December 1778, General George Washington's chief of intelligence and Culper Ring spymaster, Major Benjamin Tallmadge recruited Hawkins to bring messages from the Ring's chief spy in New York City, Abraham Woodhull, to Setuaket, New York where they would be forwarded to Tallmadge. Woodhull used the code name "Samuel Culper", later "Samuel Culper, Sr." to avoid detection if his letters were intercepted. Tallmadge was referred to by the alias "John Bolton." Woodhull made trips into New York, ostensibly to visit his sister, Mary Underhill, who operated a boarding house with her husband Amos Underhill. Woodhull continued his visits to New York into the summer of 1779, although he became increasingly anxious that his continuing visits to New York City might lead to his discovery as time passed.

At first, Woodhull had to return to Setauket to pass messages to Caleb Brewster, a Continental Army officer who spent most of his time operating whaleboats on Long Island Sound for secret military purposes, to take to Tallmadge or to receive messages from Tallmdadge via Brewster. By December 1778, Tallmadge set up couriers, at first Jonas Hawkins, then in the early summer mainly Austin Roe, who would take messages the 55 miles (89 km) between New York and Setauket to pass them to Brewster. Hawkins's task was to get the letters to Brewster who would pick up messages at Setauket and take them across the Sound to Tallmadge at Fairfield, Connecticut. Tallmadge would then forward the messages to Washington.

In June 1779, Woodhull engaged Robert Townsend, who used the alias "Samuel Culper, Jr." to gather intelligence in New York City. Since Townsend was engaged in business there, his presence was expected to arouse less suspicion than Woodhull's visits would. He also had access to British officers through the authorship of a society column in a Loyalist newspaper and his tailoring business, as well as his interest in a coffeehouse with Loyalist newspaper owner James Rivington, who also was a secret member of the Ring.

After Townsend began his intelligence activities in New York City, Woodhull operated almost exclusively from Setauket. A revised communications network was then established in which Townsend would pass intelligence to a courier, at first Hawkins, then Hawkins and Roe, and after September 1779, exclusively Roe, who would take it to Setauket and pass it to Woodhull, usually via dead drop. Woodhull would evaluate and comment on it and pass it to Brewster, who would take it across Long Island Sound, occasionally adding an intelligence note of his own, and pass it to Tallmadge. Tallmadge would usually add a cover letter with comments. According to widely accepted local and family tradition, Anna Strong signalled Brewster, who ran frequent trips with his whaleboats across the Sound on smuggling and military missions, that a message was ready. She hung a black petticoat on her clothesline at Strong Point in Setauket, which was easily visible by Brewster from a boat in the Sound and by Woodhull from his nearby farm after he began to operate from Setauket. She would add a number of handkerchiefs for one of six coves where Brewster would bring his boat and Woodhull would meet him. Historian Richard Welch writes that the tradition of the clothesline signal is unverifiable but it is known that the British had a woman at Setauket who fits Anna's profile under suspicion for disloyal activities. Tallmadge found that personally taking the message to Washington was too time-consuming. So he sent messages after the first one to Washington by a dragoon, then by a relay of dragoons, acting as couriers.

Hawkins at first was bold but became increasingly anxious about British patrols. His role was reduced between April 1779 when Woodhull identified both Hawkins and Roe as couriers for the Ring and July 1779 when Tallmadge gave Roe, but not Hawkins, a code number in his code directory.

Woodhull wrote in a coded message on August 15, 1779, that Hawkins had to destroy a letter from Culper, Jr., or be captured. In his August 15 message, Woodhull wrote that Hawkins insisted that his next meeting with Townsend be in an out of the way location. Townsend did not like taking the additional risk and was beginning to doubt Hawkins's reliability and to regret the destroyed messages. Finally in September 1779, with Hawkins increasingly anxious, and more importantly, with Townsend refusing to deal with him any longer, Hawkins stopped his courier services for the Ring. Woodhull acted as courier on September 11 so he could explain to Townsend the loss of the earlier letters. Austin Roe then became the sole permanent courier for the Ring.

== Aftermath ==
In 1786, Hawkins was a captain, and his fellow Culper Ring courier, Austin Roe was a lieutenant, in Lieutenant Colonel David Pierson's New York militia regiment in Suffolk County, New York. By 1787, Hawkins was a major and Roe was a captain. Hawkins resigned from the militia in 1803.

Major Jonas Hawkins inherited the Hawkins-Mount Homestead in Stony Brook, later known as the William Sidney Mount House, from his father. By 1797, he operated a tavern and inn in the large structure, which also served as the local post office.

The Suffolk Lodge of the Freemasons moved to Jonas Hawkins's house at Stony Brook on January 23, 1802, but soon moved again to Goldsmith Davis's house at Coram, New York, on August 20, 1802.

On June 25, 1810, Jonas Hawkins, Benjamin F. Thompson and Charles H. Havens founded a branch of the Tammany Society at Setauket.

Hawkins's daughter Julia Ann Mount inherited house when he died in 1817 and moved there with her children, including later artists William Sidney Mount, Shepard Alonzo Mount and Henry Smith Mount.

Jonas Hawkins died on April 24, 1817, at Mills Pond, New York.

== In popular culture ==
The Culper Ring is depicted in the fictionalized AMC American Revolutionary War spy thriller period drama series, Turn: Washington's Spies, based on Alexander Rose's historical book Washington's Spies: The Story of America's First Spy Ring (2007).

== See also ==
- Intelligence in the American Revolutionary War
- Intelligence operations in the American Revolutionary War
