= Evelina Mount =

19th-century American still-life painter

- Born: July 31, 1837; Stony Brook, New York
- Died: July 24, 1920 (aged 82); Stony Brook, New York
- Known for: Floral Still-Lifes and Landscape painting

Evelina "Nina" Mount (1837–1920) was a 19th-century American female artist. Born in Stony Brook, New York in 1837, as a daughter of an artist, Evelina was introduced to art at an early age by her father, Henry Mount, and her paternal uncles, Shepard Alonzo Mount and William Sidney Mount, with the latter being her mentor for the first three decades of her life. She is best known for her floral still-lifes and landscapes.

== Early life ==
Evelina Mount, Mount House, n.d., oil on board

Evelina Mount, nicknamed "Nina," was born on July 31, 1837, to parents Henry Smith Mount (1802-1841) and Mary Bates Ford (1805-1887); she had five siblings: Julia Hawkins (1827-1855), Elizabeth Reeves (1829-1911), Henry John (1832-1894), Thomas Sheppard "Judge" (1834-1900), and Malcolm (1839-1887). Evelina's father, known for his artistic skills in painting still-lifes and signs, died in 1841 from tuberculosis when Evelina was just four years old.

She was raised in Stony Brook, New York, residing in the Hawkins-Mount House where she lived for most of her life except for brief, periodic stays in New York City.

During the 1840s, the Hawkins-Mount House was co-occupied by the family of Shepard Alonzo Mount and William Sidney Mount, Evelina's artistic uncles who encouraged her interest in art.

== Education and training ==
Growing up in the mid-nineteenth century, Evelina was one of the few women on Long Island who surpassed the constraints of her time to become a successful artist. One of the main reasons Evelina was able to work around the propriety and social standards for young women was her familial connection to her artistic paternal uncles, especially William Sidney Mount.

Evelina Mount, Mount House from Road, n.d., oil on beveled panel

William was a mentor to Evelina and encouraged her to practice her artistic skill through informal training and observation with him. He provided instruction regarding perspective and choice of paint colors, freely offered commentary on Evelina's work, and when asked, he added finishing touches to her paintings. Several of Evelina's paintings are copies of William's paintings with small changes or additions of a feminine quality. For example, Evelina's oil on canvas Mount House from Road is a meticulous replica of William's oil The Mount House (1854) except for her addition of a bonneted figure of a woman in the background who stands next to the original male figure.

William Sidney Mount started encouraging Evelina to pursue formal artistic training in New York City in the 1850s and in 1867-1868 Evelina undertook a course of study with Hudson River School artist James McDougal Hart.

Between 1871 and 1878, Evelina exhibited a total of seven paintings at the annual exhibitions of the National Academy of Design, six of which were identified as still-life florals. Besides exhibiting at the National Academy of Design, Evelina only exhibited publicly one other time at the Academy of Design in Chicago where she showed her painting, Vase of Flowers.

Although she is considered Long Island's first professional woman artist, Evelina rarely sold her works; instead she chose to gift them to family and friends.

== Style and technique ==
Evelina Mount, Daisies, n.d., oil on canvas

=== Still-lifes ===
Evelina Mount, Roses and Fuchsia, 1867, oil on canvas

Evelina is best known for her paintings of floral still-lifes. As a young artist in her twenties, Evelina strived to depict her florals in a conventional manner, which typified one popular style of art in the late 1850s. Her early representations of wildflowers, for example, her oil on canvas titled Daisies, clearly reflects conventional representation of nature in an outdoor setting.

Evelina Mount, Floral Wreath, n.d., oil on panel

She also took interest in flower arrangements strewn haphazardly together which are also examples of the popular style of this time (see example Roses and Fuchsia, 1867, oil on canvas). The placement of these flowers on a tabletop with minimal background reflect Nina's desire to keep the arrangements within a contained, logical space.

After her training with James McDougal Hart in the late 1860s, Evelina's floral still-life style underwent a change. She departed from her conventional settings and explored more unique views. Her oil painting Floral Wreath, depicts a wreath attached to a branch suspended in space.

Although Evelina very rarely dated her artworks, when she painted her still-lifes can be approximated by comparing them to those that were dated as well as the style in which they are painted.

=== Landscapes ===
While Evelina is known for her floral still-lifes, her artistic skills with landscape paintings are also noteworthy. Like her uncle and mentor William Sidney Mount, Nina preferred to paint the area which she was most familiar, her hometown of Stony Brook, Long Island. Many of her landscapes feature the Hawkins-Mount House and grounds where she resided most of her life. These paintings reflect her love of the area as well as the endless painterly possibilities of the old farmhouse and surrounding property. Other local structures she depicted, such as the Setauket Mill and the Longbotham Farm provide some of the only visual evidence of their existence today.

Evelina Mount, The Dock House, Stony Brook, n.d., oil on canvas

Evelina also participated in plein-air painting, a popular artistic movement of her time. For example, her oil on canvas The Dock House, Stony Brook, which was painted outdoors, reflects the spontaneity and freshness associated with works completed in the open air.

Unlike her florals, the style of her landscapes did not drastically change, making it difficult to date these works.

== Later days ==
Evelina Mount ceased painting by the 1890s. Her reasons for abandoning her art is unclear, but may be due, in part to the death of her uncle and mentor, William Sidney Mount in 1868 and her loss of connection to he New York City art scene.

Evelina Mount suffered a stroke in 1910 and used a wheelchair until her death, at age eighty-three, on July 24, 1920. Evelina was buried alongside her sister Elizabeth in the Presbyterian Churchyard in Setauket, New York where her uncle, William Sidney Mount is also buried.

== Notable collections ==
- The Long Island Museum of American Art, History, and Carriages - owns 96 works by Evelina Mount - the majority of her known surviving drawings and paintings.
