= Shepard Alonzo Mount =

Nineteenth century American artist

Portrait of Shepard Alonzo Mount by William Sidney Mount, 1847

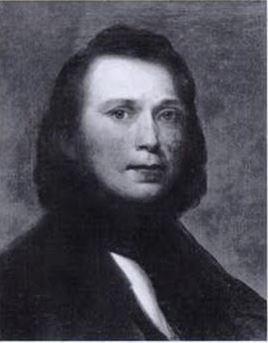
Shepard Alonzo Mount self-portrait (before 1868)

Shepard Alonzo Mount (1804-1868) was a National Academy of Design-trained American artist during the mid-nineteenth century that painted favorable genres of realism during the time such as still-life and landscapes. He found inspiration from subjects and themes found in local areas around him. He was best known for portraiture. Mount was highly regarded for his ability to capture a meticulously rendered likeness and personality of his portrait subjects.

== Biography ==
Mount was born on July 17, 1804, in Setauket, New York. He was one of five children of Julia Ann Hawkins (1782-1841) and Thomas Shepard Mount (1778-1814). Other siblings include eldest Henry Smith Mount (1802-1841), Robert Nelson (1806-1883), the prominent artist William Sidney Mount (1807-1868), and Ruth Hawkins (1808-1888). Until the death of their father Thomas Shepard in 1814, the family owned and operated an inn and farm. Shortly after his death, they moved to Stony Brook, New York, to live with Julia Ann’s parents Ruth and Jonas Hawkins. Shepard’s introduction to the fine arts would come through more practical craftsmanship.

=== Education and early career ===
Julia Ann apprenticed her son Shepard to a carriage builder named James Brewster in New Haven, Connecticut. Shepard worked for Brewster from 1821 to about 1828 trimming carriage interiors. This experience helped refine Shepard’s eye for color theory, style, and design.

In 1827, Shepard ended his apprenticeship and reunited with his brothers Henry and William in New York City where he enrolled in drawing classes at the National Academy of Design alongside William. His brother, Henry had opened a business of his own in ornamental painting with William working alongside him; in the workshop there, all three brothers would practice their drawing in the evenings after closing.

In 1828, Shepard and William decided to open a portrait studio at 15 Cherry Street in New York City. After the portrait studio closed due to a lack of success, the brothers relocated to Athens, Pennsylvania. Shepard returned to New York not long after where he began studying portrait painting with Henry Inman.

== Style and technique ==
Shepard Alonzo Mount, Fish, 1847, oil on panel

=== Still-life ===
In the earlier period of his career Shepard focused on producing still-life paintings for exhibition. Mount’s first exhibited work was in 1829 at the Academy, titled Still Life; Composition. He was heavily influenced by his older brother Henry.

Shepard Mount received a great deal of recognition for his still life paintings of fish. In a letter to his brother William Mount, he described his awareness of his skill as he wrote, "You must allow me to brag a little on fish as I sometimes think (and not without some reason) that they are the only subjects I can paint really well."

=== Landscapes ===
Shepard Alonzo Mount, Hudson River Scene, 1861, oil on panel

Shepard had a great deal of admiration for nature, evident in his landscape paintings. Though it was his genre of choice, he rarely exhibited them. His painting, Hudson River Scene, finished in 1861, depicts a golden past. Two ornately dressed Native Americans gaze across the Hudson River. In the river below he placed a man in a rowboat as a reference to the journey through life, and to represent himself in his piece. This was a favored theme of his which he frequently recreated in landscapes. In this particular scene, his subject matter symbolizes the passage through time and the fading of the golden age into modernity. Shepard created most of his landscapes based on the Susquehanna River close to the New York-Pennsylvania state line near Athens, Pennsylvania.

=== Portraits ===
After the Mount brothers closed the portrait shop in 1829, Shepard made his way to Athens, Pennsylvania, where he made his living painting portraits. In this area competition was scarce ensuring Shepard a likely prospect in commissions. He continued painting portraits for relatives and friends for a little over a half a year in Athens, until his return to Stony Brook in 1830, where he was commissioned to paint the now-lost portrait of Setauket physician, Dr. Henry S. Dering. Shepard’s portrait that year of an African American woman named Tamer is one of his earliest surviving portraits. Tamer lived and worked as a domestic servant at the St. James estate of William and Eliza Mills.

Shepard Alonzo Mount, Portrait of Mr. John Bedell, 1833, oil on canvas

Later, Shepard’s portraits became more traditional with tighter brush strokes and compositional format. The painting's additional background composition would correlate with the subject’s occupation, interests, or social status which was a common formulation during the eighteenth and nineteenth century portrait painting. Shepard also became heavily influenced by Henry Inman (1801-1846). Inman regularly visited Stony Brook for leisurely time spent for hunting and fishing. Shepard’s outdoor activities with Inman became lessons in painting portraiture, Inman’s area of expertise. Shepard was able to escalate his skill in portrait painting because of Inman’s advisement. Shepard abandoned the use of background elements and other objects to describe a sitter’s personality and livelihood, using his newly developed skills to identify the individual with elements of color and brush stoke techniques. In 1833, Shepard painted John Bedell using strong contrast, linear brush strokes, and crisp colors to accentuate Bedell’s nature. For his portrait of his sister Ruth in 1834, Shepard used looser painterly brush techniques to invoke a more romanticized gesture. Color was used playful across the painting to demonstrate her delicate personality. His newly found style granted him the opportunity to exhibit John Bedell in 1833 as his first public piece. Later that year he was elected to become an associate member of the National Academy of Design. As time progressed, Shepard’s artistic abilities in portraiture became known and his recognition as an artist increased. He began getting commissioned by socialites that resided in New York City. These individuals included business owners, established Wall Street executives, and other professional and mercantile individuals from the rising upper-middle class of this period.

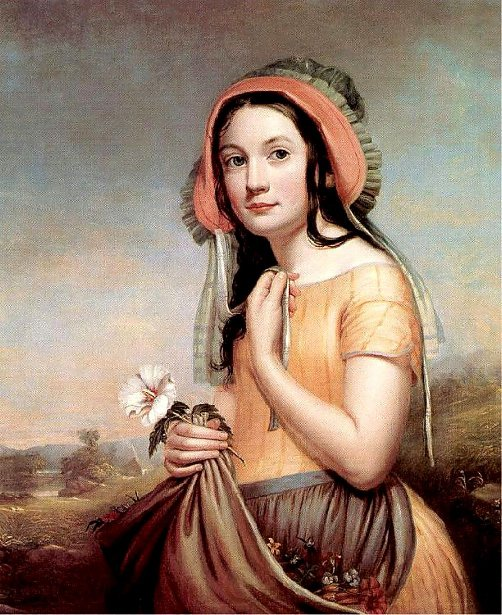
Shepard Alonzo Mount,Rose of Sharon, 1850, oil on canvas

Shepard’s first milestone piece as a professional portrait painter was of his wife, Elizabeth Elliott Mount, completed in 1838, a year after they were married. This painting was exhibited in 1838 at the National Academy of Design. Shepard’s skills, reputation, and fame as a portrait painter increased after this achievement. In addition to Shepard’s accomplishments as a painter, he also began his family with Elizabeth in 1838. Their firstborn was named William Shepard Mount in honor of his uncle; Ruth also known as Tutie was born in 1842; Joshua was born in 1845; and lastly in 1853 Robert was born. Shepard often used his children as models for his paintings.

The peak of Shepard’s career was realized in his painting Rose of Sharon, 1850, the subject being his daughter Ruth (1842-1861), or Tutie, as he called her. In this painting, he used illusions of landscape elements as the background, a favorite technique used in many of his portraitures. She was also painted gently holding flowers, complimenting her delicate beauty and her fruitful youth. One feature of this painting that truly stands out among the rest is his advanced use of color and technique. He painted her skin as filled with life, a glow from within. Goupil et Cie, a successful publishing firm in Paris, commissioned the reproduction of Rose of Sharon as a lithograph. It was later distributed commercially throughout the U.S. and Europe, helping to spread his notoriety. His love for his daughter illuminates this painting, making this particular one of his most renowned work.

== Later days ==
Shepard Alonzo Mount, Camille Mount, 1868, oil on canvas

Shepard often travelled for commission work, manly to New York City. Elizabeth grew bitter over Shepard’s constant commutes resulting a strain in their marriage. In August 1858, Elizabeth died at the age of 42. Overwhelmed by her death Shepard left his children in his sister Ruth’s care in Stony Brook, New York, for six weeks. In 1861, at the age of only 19, Tutie died of consumption four months after being married. In 1863, his eldest son William Shepard was forcibly drafted into the Civil War during his time in Mississippi as a part of the Army of the Confederacy. William Shepard found his way to Union soldiers and asked to join them. Unfortunately, Union soldiers took him for a spy and imprisoned him. Shepard was finally able to release his son from imprisonment thanks to his friend Francis Bicknell Carpenter, a fellow artist, was painting a portrait of Abraham Lincoln and gave him letter endorsing his plea. Lincoln immediately ordered for William Shepard’s release.

Shepard continued to paint throughout his later years. His last painting, Camille Mount, of his recently deceased granddaughter, was finished on September 12, 1868. He then died in Stony Brook six days later at the age of 64 from falling ill of cholera. He is now buried in Saint James Episcopal Church Graveyard in Saint James, New York.
