= Stony Brook, New York =

- Hamlet and census-designated place
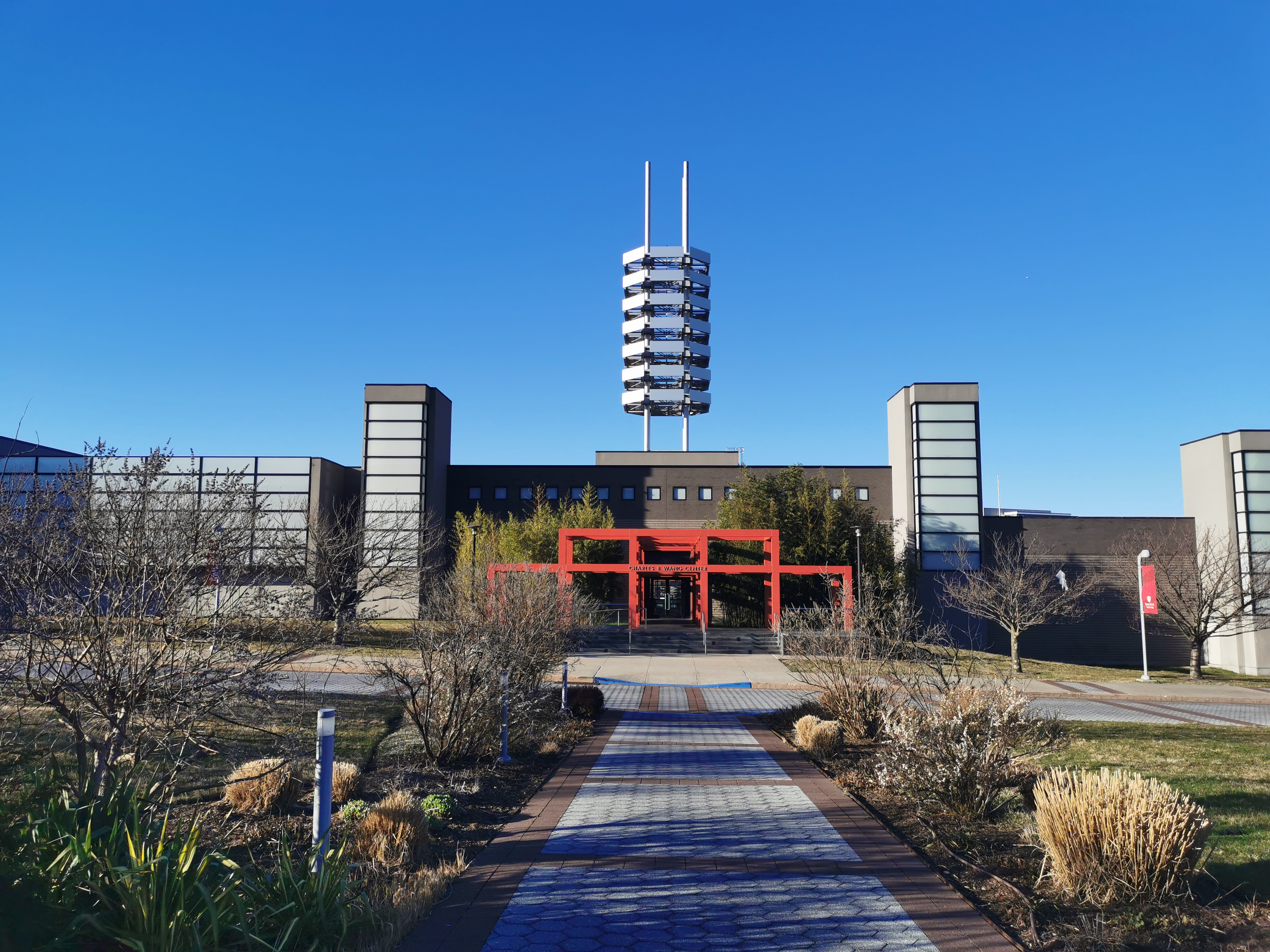
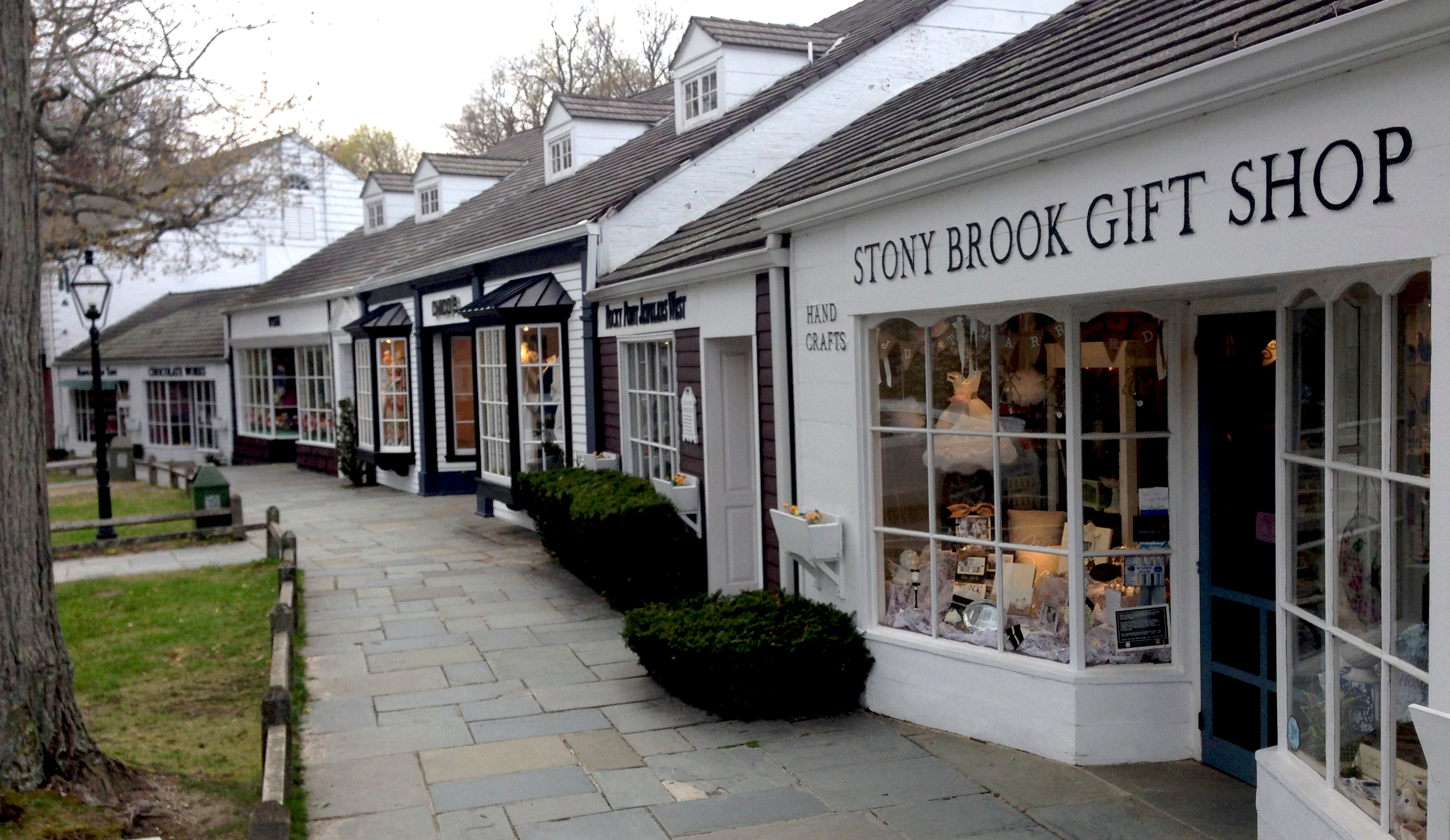
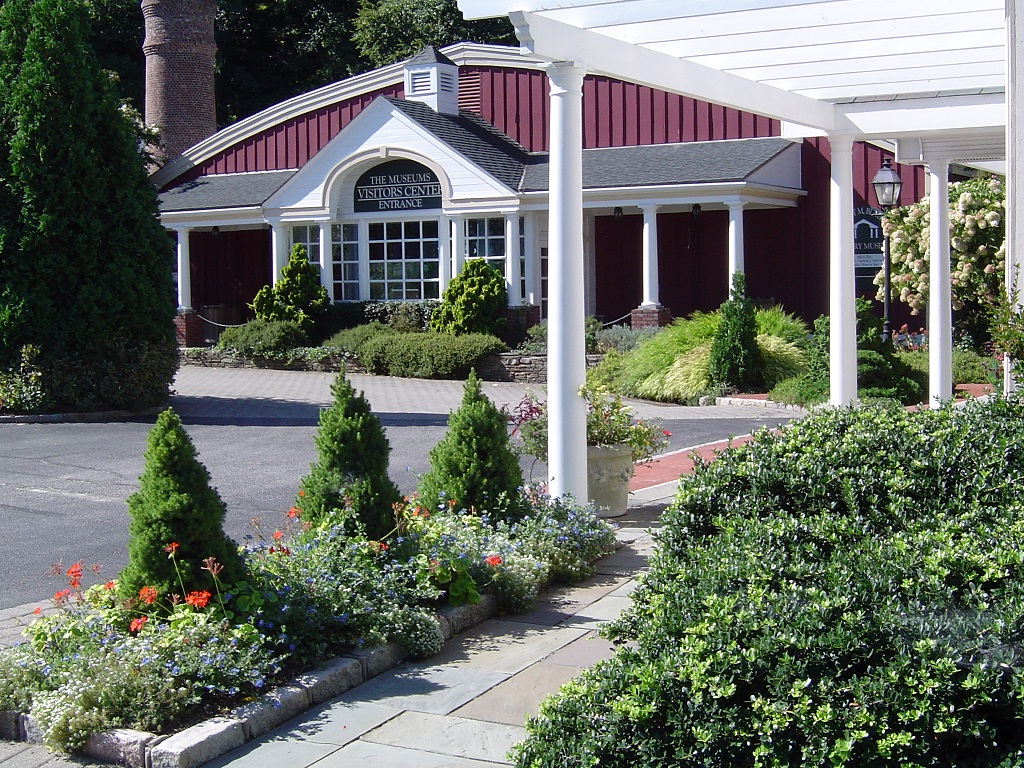
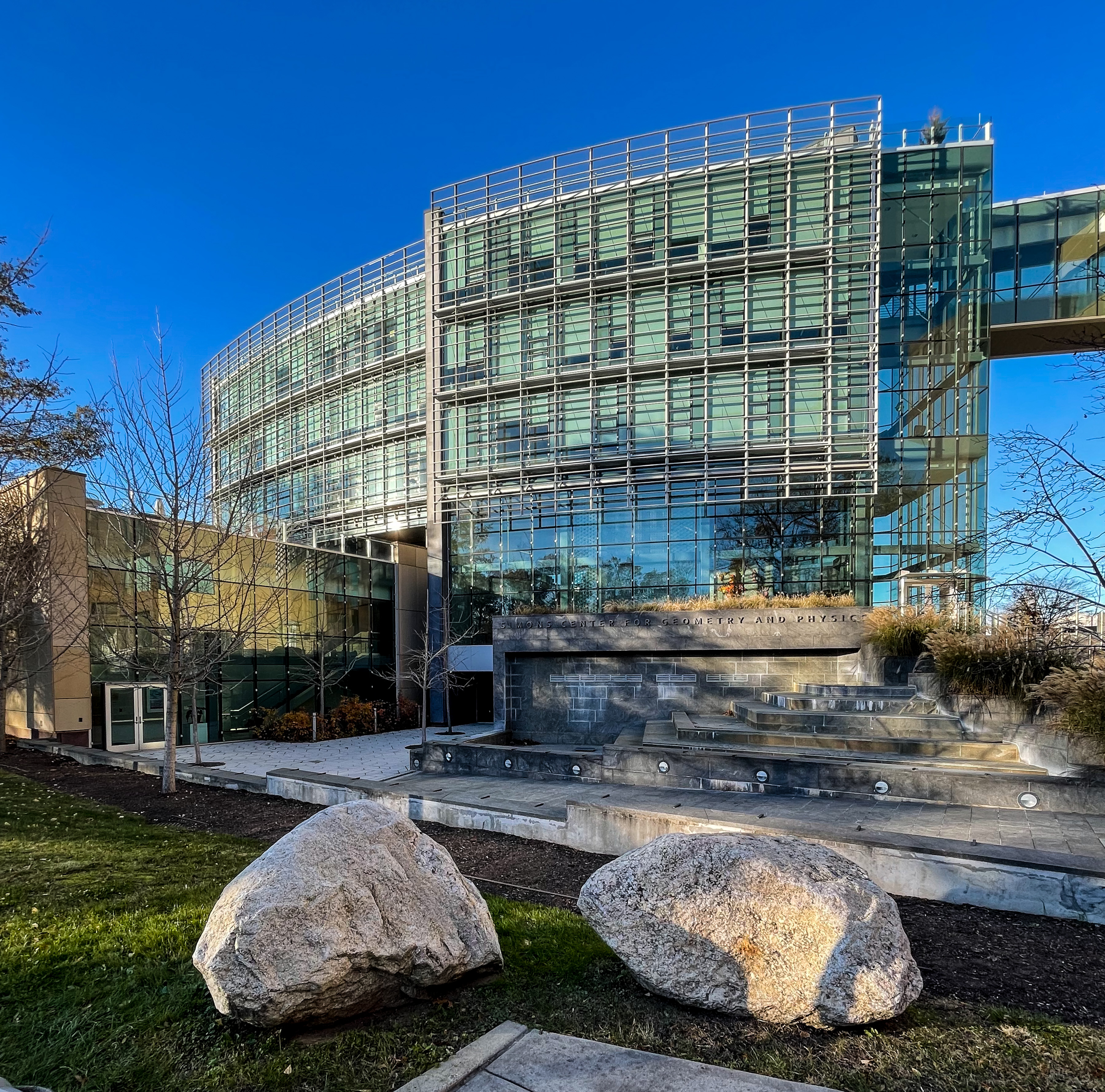
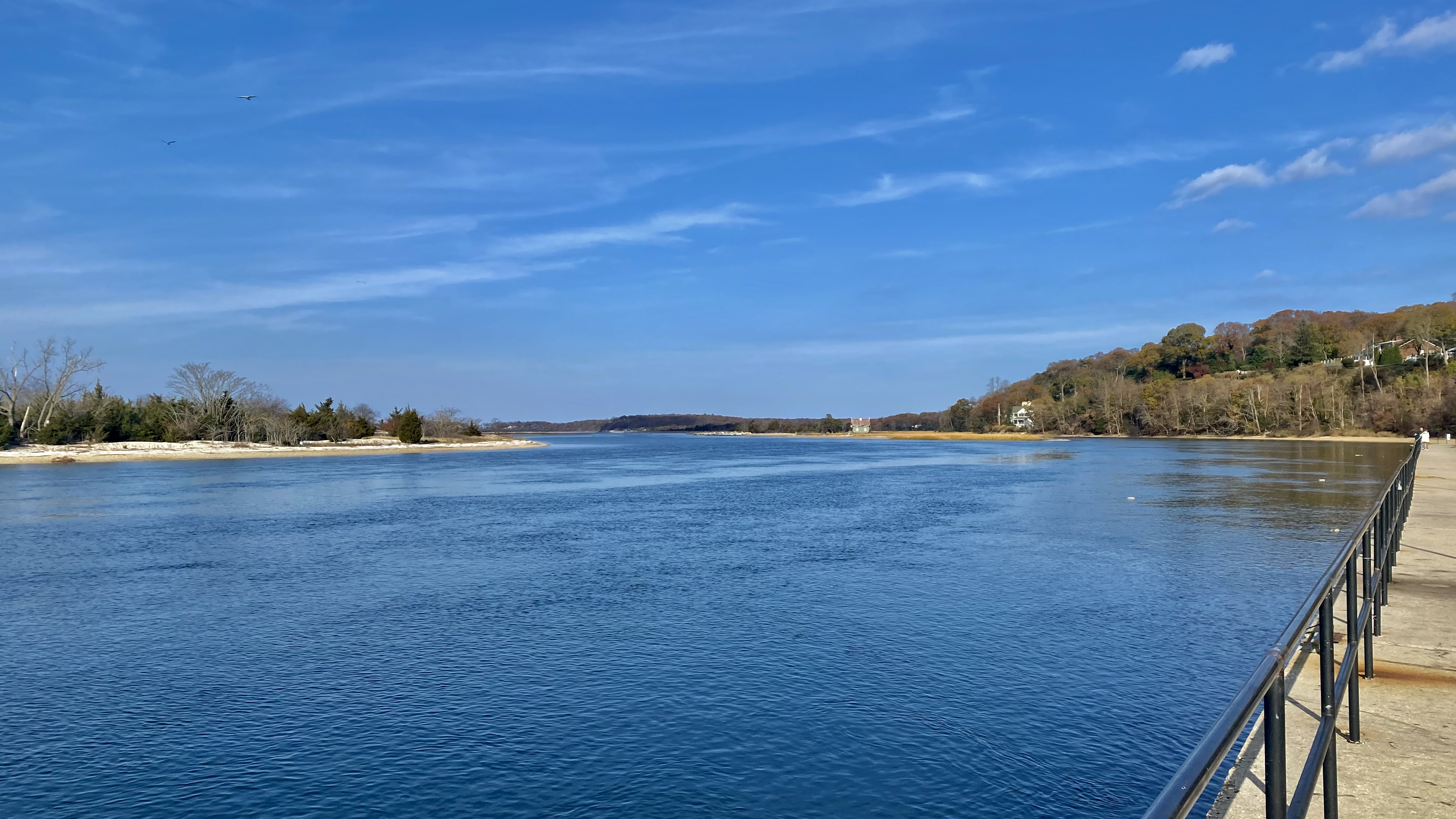
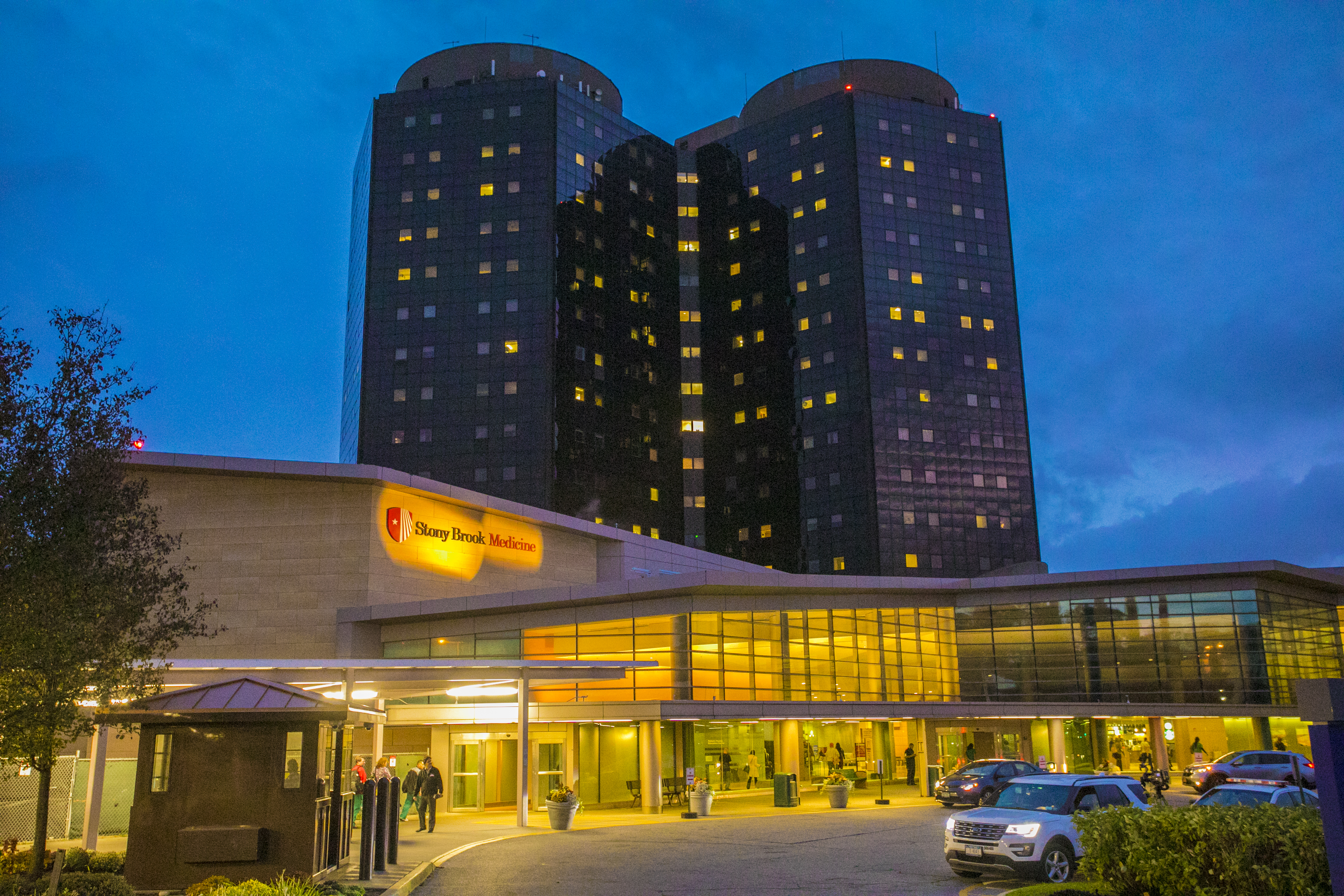
- Stony Brook University Stony Brook Village Center Long Island Museums Simons Center for Geometry and Physics Stony Brook Harbor Stony Brook Hospital

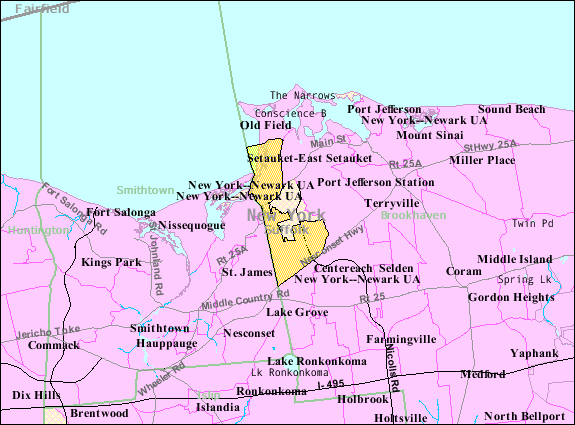
- U.S. Census map

- Location within Long Island Location within New York
- Coordinates: 40°54′23″N 73°7′42″W
- Country: United States
- State: New York
- County: Suffolk
- Town: Brookhaven

Area
  - Total: 6.25 sq mi (16.18 km^{2})
  - Land: 5.82 sq mi (15.08 km^{2})
  - Water: 0.42 sq mi (1.10 km^{2})
- Elevation: 89 ft (27 m)

Population (2020)
  - Total: 13,467
  - Density: 2,312.6/sq mi (892.91/km^{2})
- Time zone: UTC−5 (Eastern (EST))
  - Summer (DST): UTC−4 (EDT)
- ZIP Codes: 11790, 11794
- Area codes: 631, 934
- FIPS code: 36-71608
- GNIS feature ID: 0966524

Stony Brook is a hamlet and census-designated place (CDP) in the Town of Brookhaven in Suffolk County, New York, United States, on the North Shore of Long Island. Begun in the colonial era as an agricultural enclave, the hamlet experienced growth first as a resort town and then to its current state as one of Long Island's major tourist towns and centers of education. Despite being referred to as a village by residents and tourists alike, Stony Brook has never been legally incorporated by the state. As of the 2020 census, Stony Brook had a population of 13,467.

The CDP is adjacent to the main campus of Stony Brook University, the largest public university in New York by area, and also The Stony Brook School, a private college preparatory school. It is also home to the Long Island Museum of American Art, History, and Carriages and the Stony Brook Village Center, a privately maintained commercial center planned in the style of a traditional New England village.

== History ==
=== Origins and early history ===
Stony Brook was first settled in the late 17th century. It was originally known by the native name Wopowog and then as Stony Brook, with both names likely referring to the interconnected bodies of water at the hamlet's western edge. It began as a satellite community of adjacent Setauket, New York, the Town of Brookhaven's first settlement, and its land was included in the initial 1655 purchase from the native Setalcott tribe.

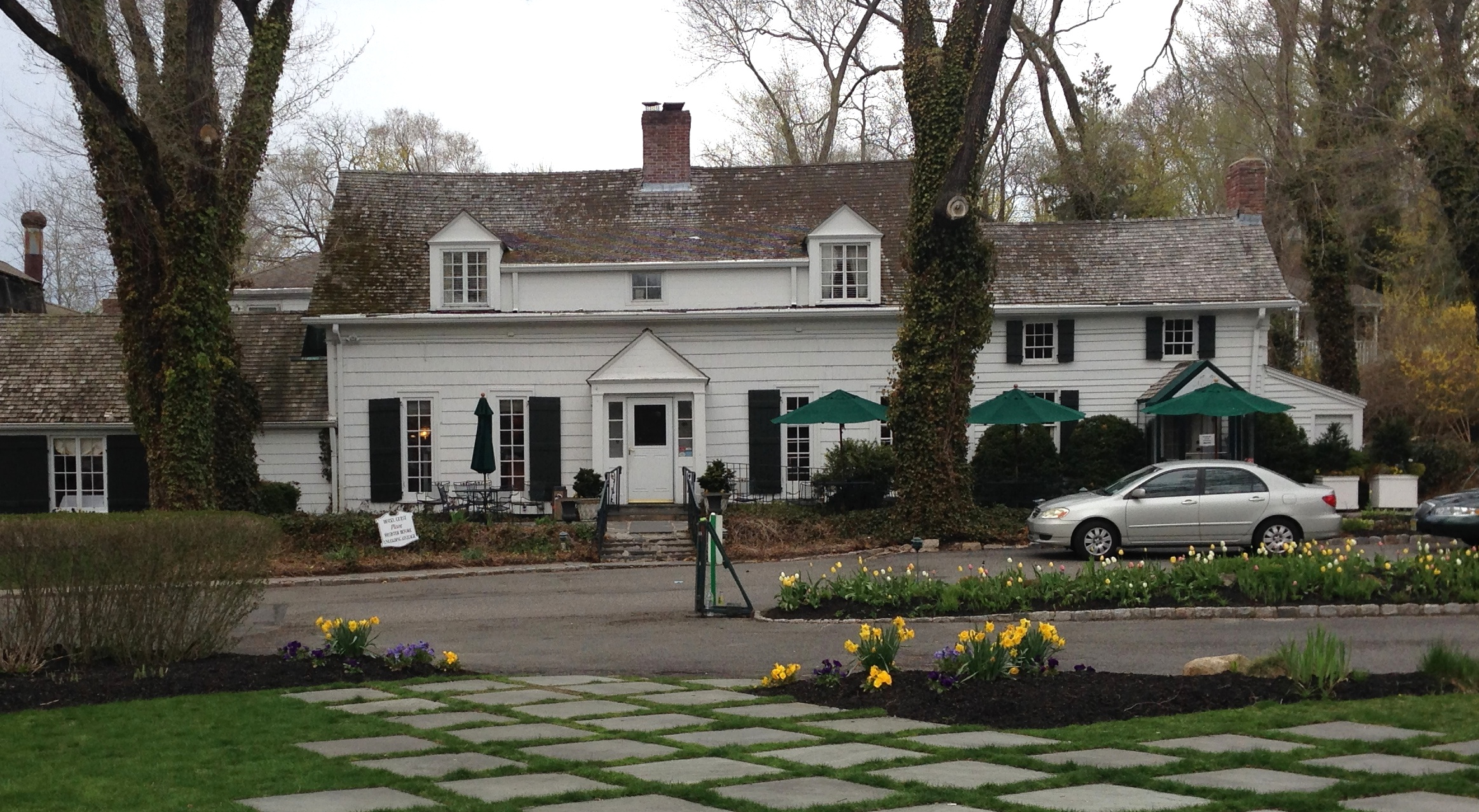
The Three Village Inn, housed in the c. 1751 Richard Hallock home

A gristmill was built in 1699 on the water body now known as the Mill Pond, currently drained after severe rain breached it in the early hours of August 19, 2024. The current structure, which replaced the original in 1751, ground grain into the 1940s and has since been repurposed for public tours. For religious services and education, the hamlet's original residents had to attend institutions in the neighboring communities of Setauket and St. James. In the latter half of the 18th century, activity began to shift from the mill area north toward the harbor as new residences, a number of which still stand, were constructed.

Stony Brook was a remote area through the 18th century aside for a modest amount of commerce near the mill at the intersection of Main Street and Harbor Road. The community's development was stalled by its poorly accessible harbor relative to nearby Setauket and Port Jefferson. In the 1840s, local painter William Sidney Mount led a call for the harbor's dredging. This was completed twice, but after the harbor filled in both times the effort was abandoned. Lacking the resources of its neighboring harbor settlements, Stony Brook based its economy on agriculture and the cordwood industry.

=== Growth ===
The Long Island Rail Road reached Stony Brook in the 1870s, creating an easy link between New York City and the citizens of Stony Brook. Stony Brook quickly became a popular summer resort for city dwellers attempting to escape the hazards and stress of urban life. The establishment of the Stony Brook Assembly in 1909 also helped to draw more residents to the local area. A number of these newcomers constructed houses and cottages, many of which were either originally made for year-round use or have since been converted to such.

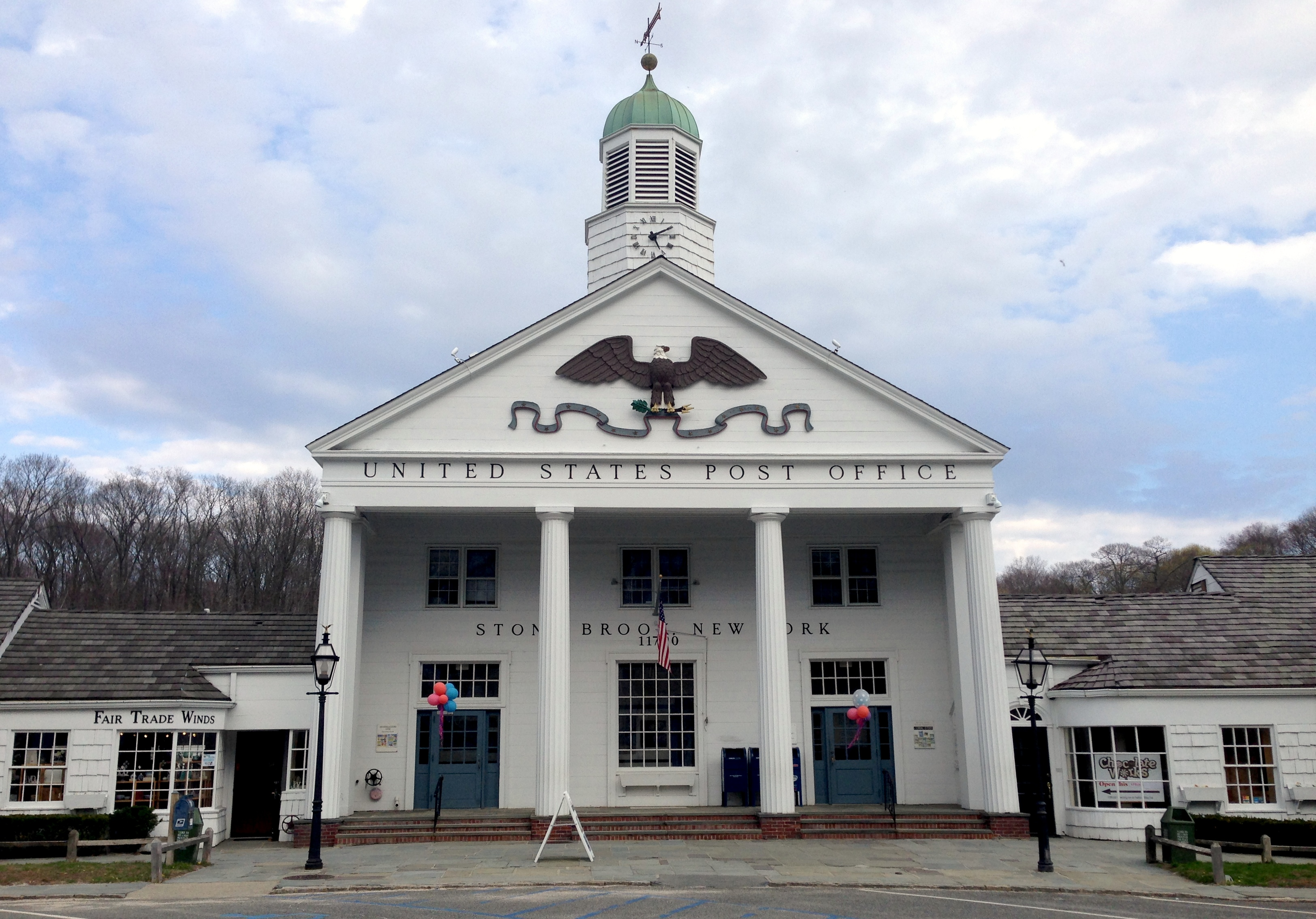
The local post office, centerpiece of the Stony Brook Village Center

Nevertheless, the majority of residences were local farmers and businessmen who depended on all necessities being in easy reach. Most businesses were then on the compact plot that would become the contemporary village green. Unlike today, the shops in this area were utilitarian and haphazardly arranged.

The history of the unincorporated "village" is closely linked to that of Ward Melville, a local businessman who owned what would become the CVS Corporation. At one point owned much of what his family coined as the Three Village area (consisting of Stony Brook, the hamlet of Setauket, and the incorporated village of Old Field).

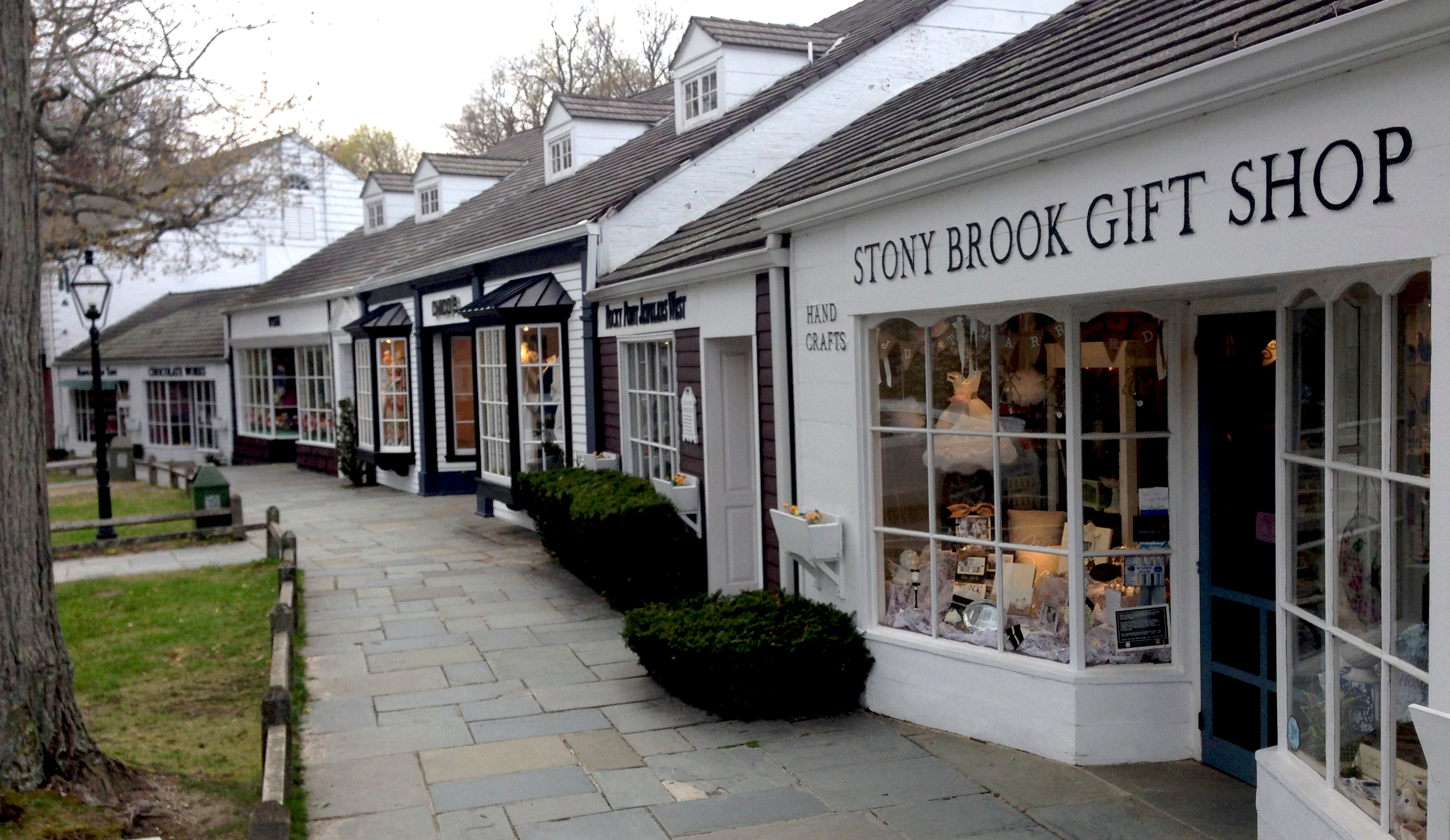
Shops in the Stony Brook Village Center

Beginning in 1939 with the creation of his Stony Brook Community Fund, Melville used his wealth to begin the transformation of part of the hamlet into his idea of an idyllic New England village, the Stony Brook Village Center, with white clapboard buildings and quaint stores. The focus had been in the previous center of the village's commerce, which now consists of a village green and a crescent of stores embellished with stone walkways and seasonal gardening. To accomplish this, Melville moved many of the existing shops in the plot into the crescent and modified their details for consistency, a design model similar to that of Colonial Williamsburg. As a centerpiece to the crescent, Melville built the Stony Brook Post Office, decorated by a large eagle that flaps its wings to mark each hour.

=== Modern development ===
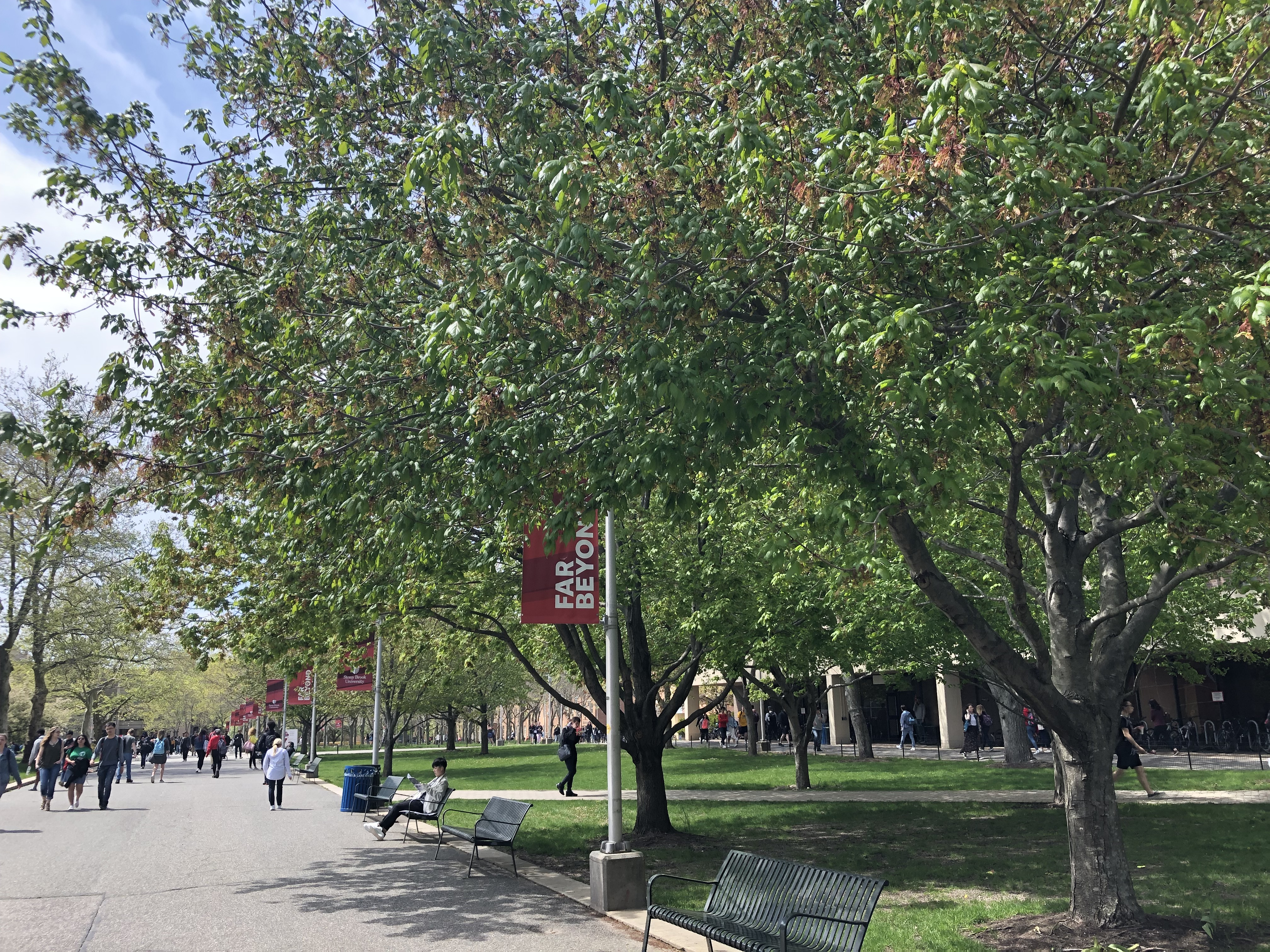
The Academic Mall across the Stony Brook University campus

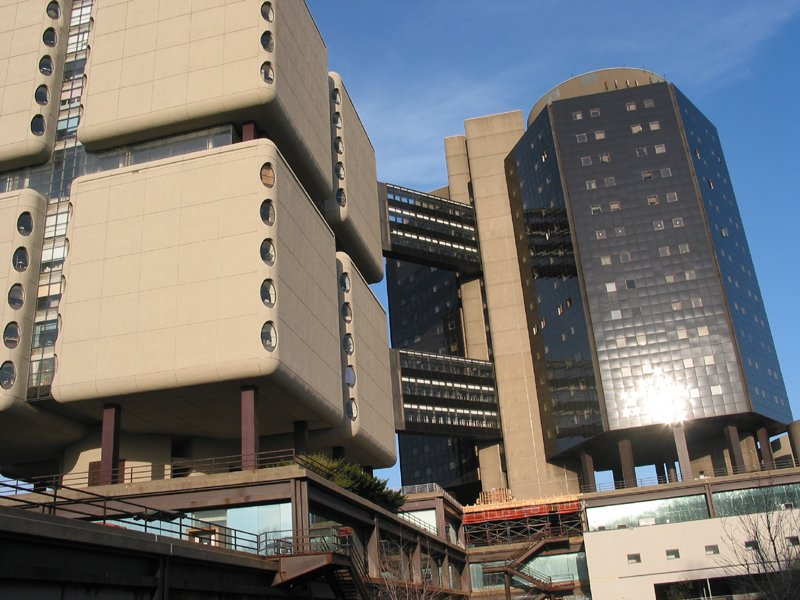
Stony Brook University Hospital

Melville donated the land and funds to New York for establishing a branch of the State University of New York in the area. This led what was then called the State University College on Long Island, at the time in constrictive Oyster Bay quarters, to relocate and change its name to Stony Brook University. Melville also donated land and funds for the local school district. The Three Village Central School District today serves several communities in the vicinity and has named its flagship Ward Melville High School after the philanthropist.

Tourist attractions include the Stony Brook Grist Mill and the Long Island Museum of American Art, History, and Carriages, a large complex of buildings originally known as the Stony Brook Carriage House and Suffolk Museum. Other Stony Brook attractions are the 19th-century William Sidney Mount House, the St. James Episcopal Chapel, and the West Meadow Beach Historic District.

== Geography ==
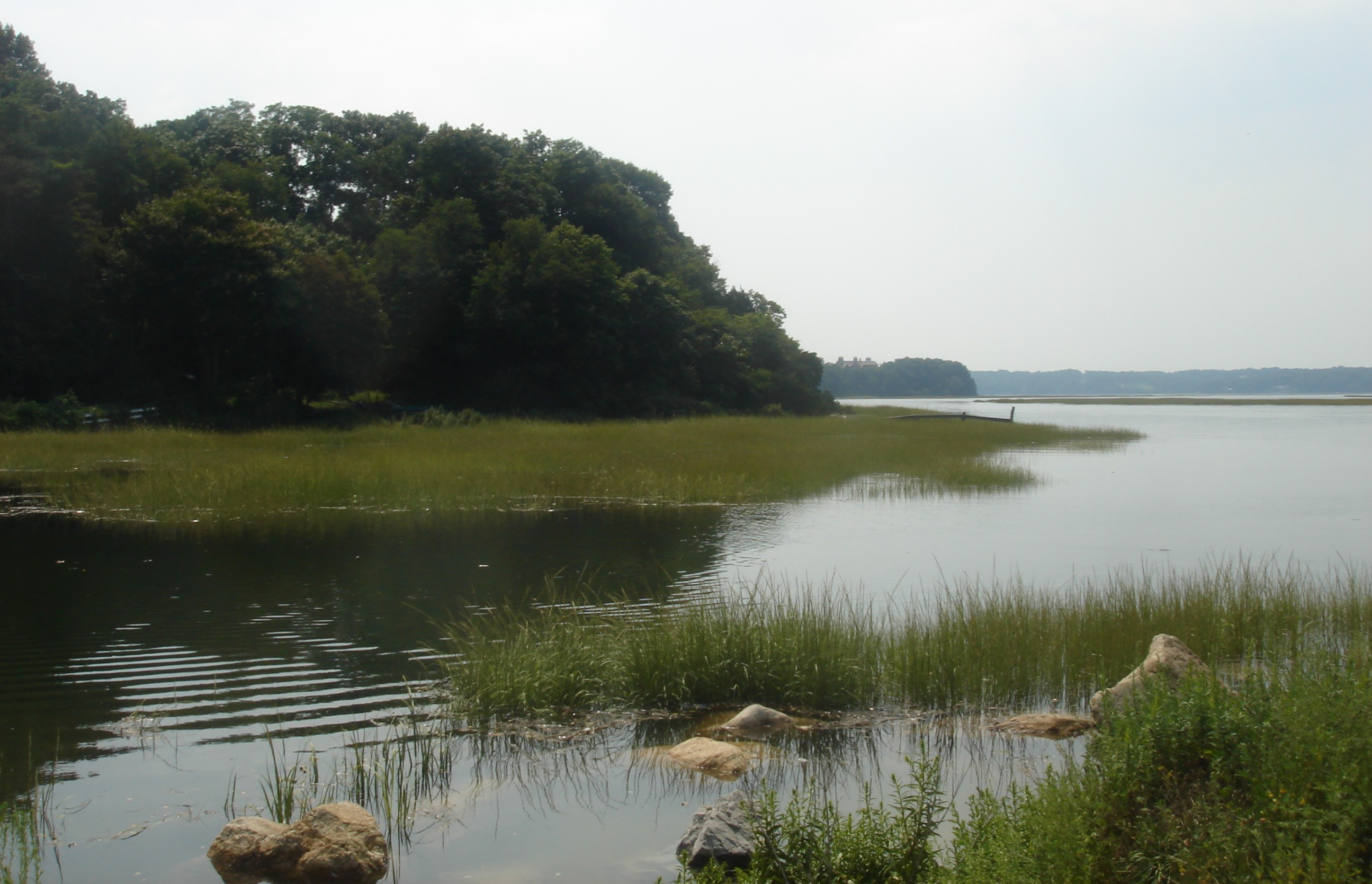
Stony Brook Harbor

Stony Brook is on the North Shore of Long Island, approximately 55 miles (89 km) east of the New York City borough of Manhattan. The census-designated place occupies an irregular shape measuring roughly 5 miles (8 km) north to south and 1 mile (1.6 km) east to west.

The historic core of Stony Brook was developed from the 17th century onward at the mouth of Stony Brook Harbor, a narrow inlet of the Long Island Sound. This section of town includes the Stony Brook Village Center, a planned commercial center in the style of New England clapboard architecture that opened in 1941. Nearby are the Long Island Museum, the Three Village Inn, and William Sidney Mount House. A peninsula in this vicinity known as the West Meadow includes a beach and wetlands reserve.

Stony Brook University is within and adjacent to the census-designated place, with its main campus less than 2 miles (3.2 km) from Stony Brook's historic center. It is primarily on the eastern side of the census-designated place, with a pedestrian entrance on Route 25a at the Stony Brook station of the Long Island Rail Road and a vehicular entrance on Nicolls Road. The local stretch of Route 25A contains shops and other commercial properties that cater to the university's student body.

The southern (inland) portion of Stony Brook primarily consists of post-war residential development. The Stony Brook University Research and Development Park (in Stony Brook and adjacent St. James) occupies a buffer between this section and the university's central campus. Forming Stony Brook's official southern boundary is Route 347, a corridor with commercial development including an AMC Loews cinema within the CDP boundaries and the Smith Haven Mall nearby.

== Education ==
Stony Brook is well known as the home and namesake of The Stony Brook School, a prep school, and Stony Brook University. The university is in a separate census-designated place and has been since the 2010 U.S. census, and up to the 2000 U.S. census the U.S. Census Bureau did not place the university in a census-designated place at all.

The hamlet is primarily located within the boundaries of (and is thus served by) the Three Village Central School District. However, a small section of the hamlet's southwestern extreme is located within the boundaries of (and is thus served by) the Middle Country Central School District. As such, children who reside within the hamlet and attend public schools go to school in one of these two districts, depending on where they reside within the hamlet.

== Transportation ==
The Stony Brook station of the Long Island Rail Road's Port Jefferson Branch is located within and serves the hamlet. Commute time to Penn Station is approximately 1 hr 48 mins including a transfer in Huntington, Hicksville or Jamaica.

== Demographics ==
Historical population
Census	Pop.	Note	%±
2020	13,467		—
U.S. Decennial Census

=== 2020 census ===
As of the 2020 census, Stony Brook had a population of 13,467. The median age was 46.0 years. 18.9% of residents were under the age of 18 and 21.1% of residents were 65 years of age or older. For every 100 females there were 96.2 males, and for every 100 females age 18 and over there were 93.9 males age 18 and over.

100.0% of residents lived in urban areas, while 0.0% lived in rural areas.

There were 4,831 households in Stony Brook, of which 29.3% had children under the age of 18 living in them. Of all households, 61.9% were married-couple households, 12.5% were households with a male householder and no spouse or partner present, and 21.8% were households with a female householder and no spouse or partner present. About 20.0% of all households were made up of individuals and 12.7% had someone living alone who was 65 years of age or older.

There were 5,033 housing units, of which 4.0% were vacant. The homeowner vacancy rate was 0.9% and the rental vacancy rate was 5.1%.

Racial composition as of the 2020 census
Race	Number	Percent
White	10,549	78.3%
Black or African American	225	1.7%
American Indian and Alaska Native	9	0.1%
Asian	1,672	12.4%
Native Hawaiian and Other Pacific Islander	3	0.0%
Some other race	174	1.3%
Two or more races	835	6.2%
Hispanic or Latino (of any race)	826	6.1%

=== 2010 census ===
As of the census of 2010, there were 13,727 people, 4,758 households, and 3,787 families residing in the CDP. The population density was 2,390.5 inhabitants per square mile (923.0/km^{2}). There were 4,970 housing units at an average density of 865.5 per square mile (334.2/km^{2}). The racial makeup of the CDP was 88.6% White, 14.4% from two or more races, 7.5% Asian, 4.4% Hispanic or Latin of any race, 1.7% African American, 0.25% from other races, 0.1% Native American, and 0.01% Pacific Islander.

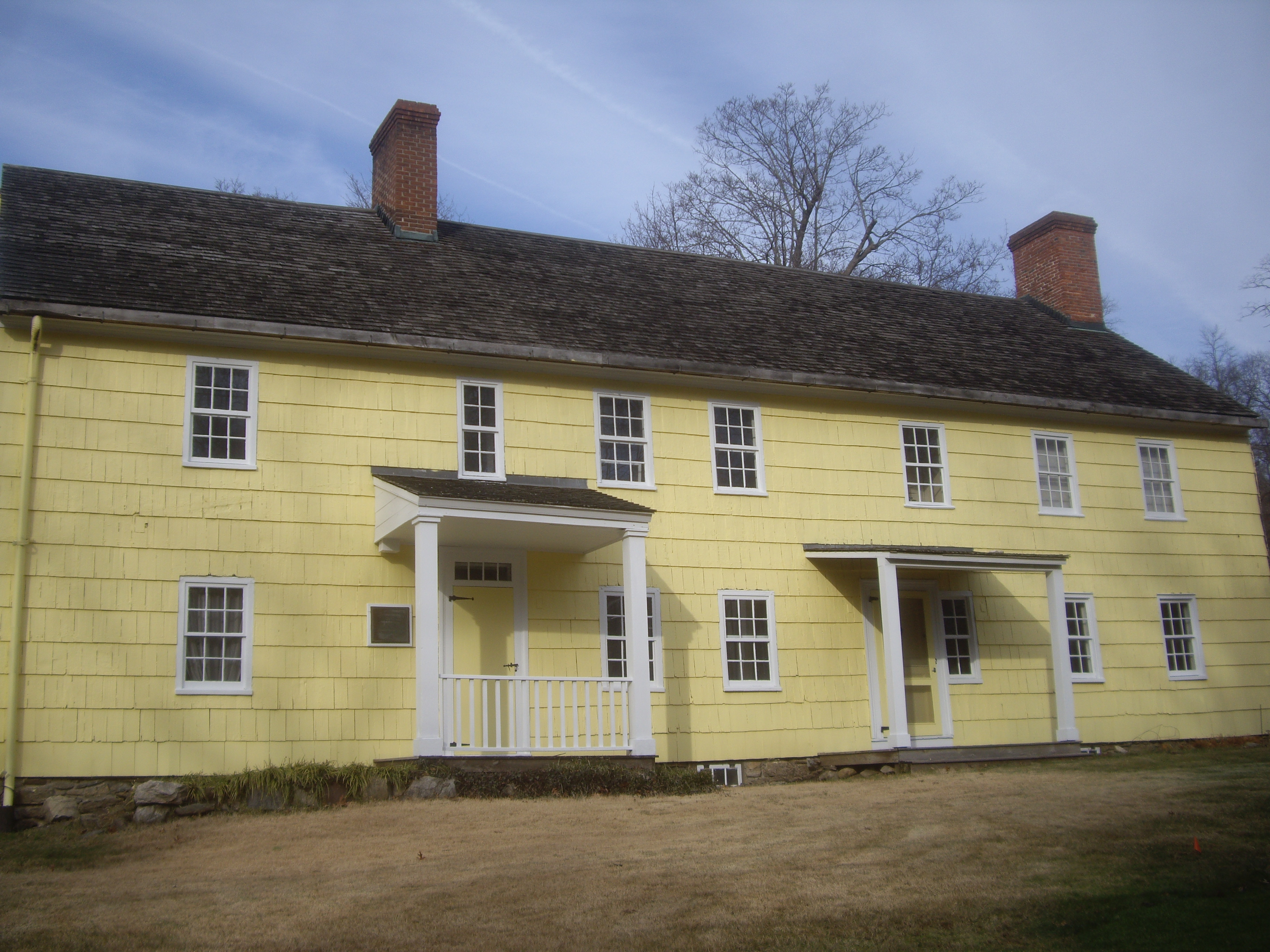
The William Sidney Mount House

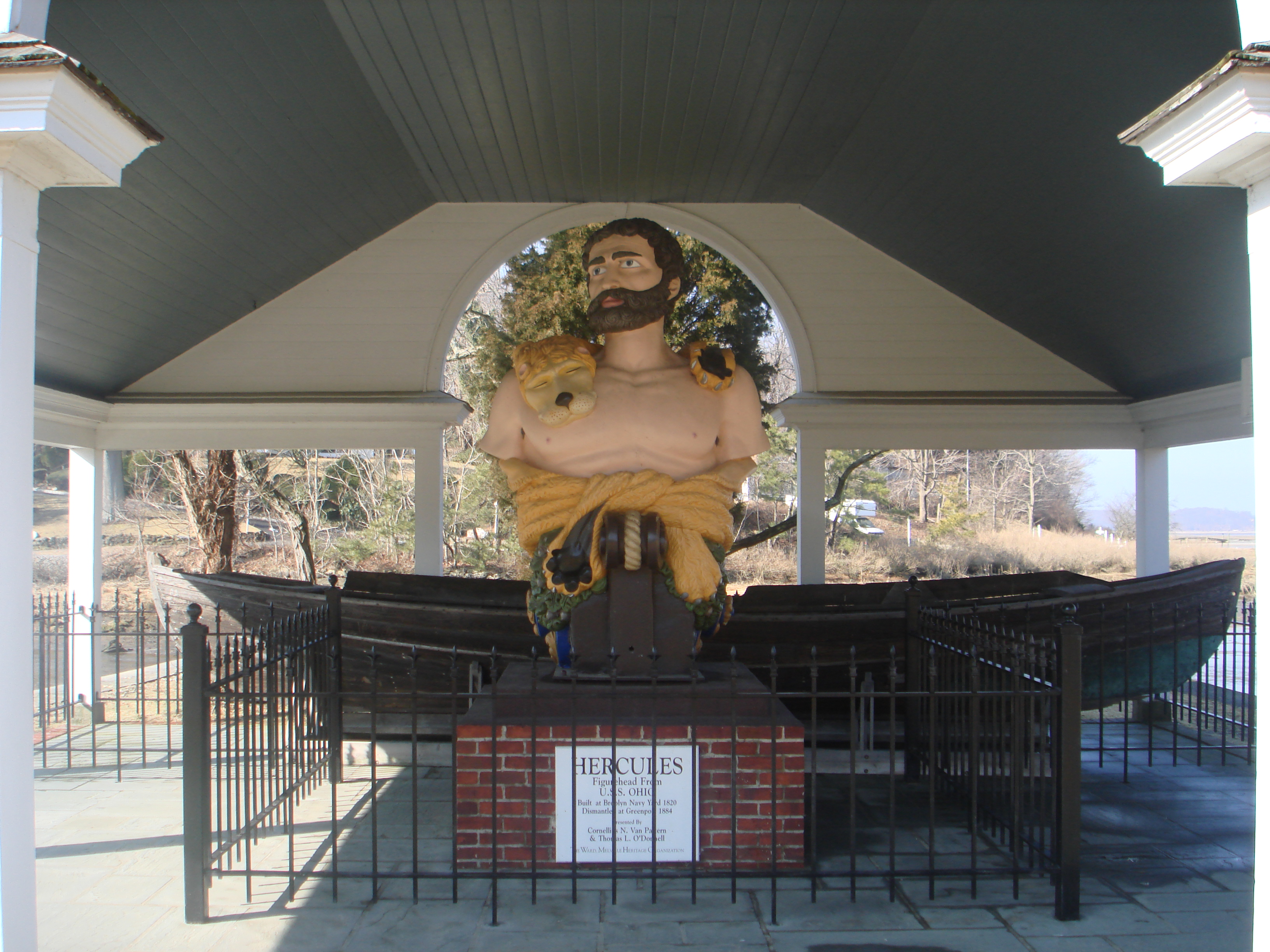
Hercules figurehead of the USS Ohio, kept in Old Stony Brook

There were 4,758 households, out of which 39.2% had children under the age of 18 living with them, 71.3% were married couples living together, 6.3% had a female householder with no husband present, and 20.4% were non-families. 16.2% of all households were made up of individuals, and 9.1% had someone living alone who was 65 years of age or older. The average household size was 2.88 and the average family size was 3.23.

In the CDP, the population was spread out, with 26.9% under the age of 18, 5.8% from 18 to 24, 28.1% from 25 to 44, 26.5% from 45 to 64, and 12.7% who were 65 years of age or older. The median age was 39 years. For every 100 females, there were 95.2 males. For every 100 females age 18 and over, there were 91.2 males.

=== Income and poverty ===
The median income for a household in the CDP was $90,009, and the median income for a family was $95,567. Males had a median income of $68,400 versus $41,770 for females. The per capita income for the CDP was $35,247. About 1.9% of families and 2.9% of the population were below the poverty line, including 1.9% of those under age 18 and 2.9% of those age 65 or over.

== Local media ==
- SBU TV, Stony Brook University Television
- Stony Brook Independent, publication at Stony Brook University
- Stony Brook Press, a newspaper at Stony Brook University.
- The Statesman, the oldest newspaper at Stony Brook University
- The Village Times Herald, a newspaper in Setauket
- WUSB (FM), Stony Brook University Radio at 90.1 FM

== Notable people ==
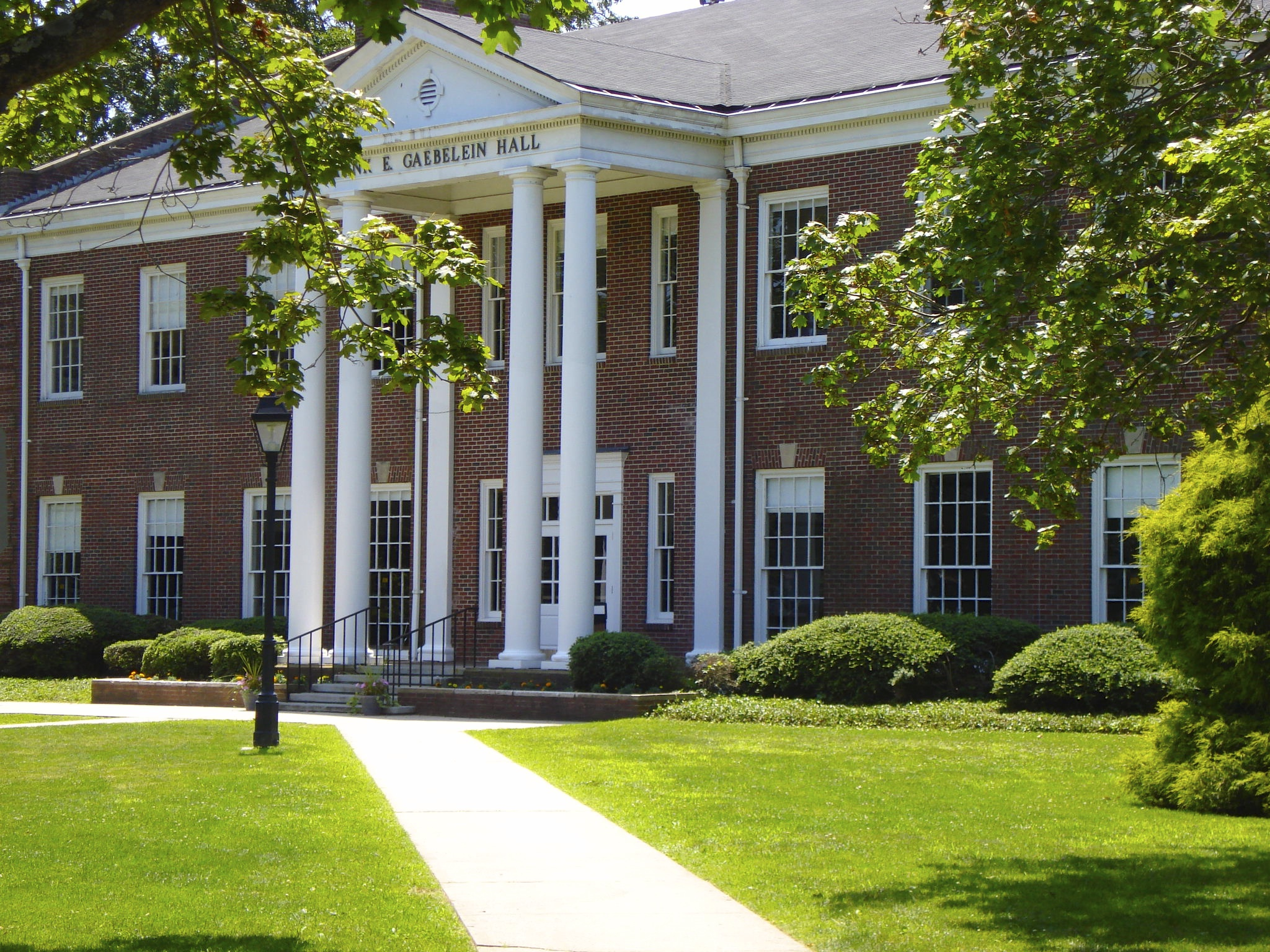
The Stony Brook School

- Bud Abbott (1897–1974), comedian
- Cody Arnoux, soccer player
- Ella May Bennett, Universalist minister
- Harold Beverage, inventor
- Blue Öyster Cult, musicians, band
- George Booth, New Yorker cartoonist
- Lars Brownworth, teacher and historian
- Nathan Bruckenthal, U.S. Coast Guardsman and posthumous Bronze Star recipient
- Sarah Drew, actress
- Brooke Ellison, first quadriplegic graduate from Harvard University
- Michael J. Epstein, filmmaker and musician
- Toni Frissell, fashion photographer
- Frank E. Gaebelein, educator
- Manon Gage, actress
- Marci Geller, independent singer-songwriter
- Kevin James, comedian, actor
- Karsh Kale, producer, composer, musician
- Anthony Kay, pitcher for the Toronto Blue Jays of Major League Baseball
- Michael Kimmel, sociologist, scholar
- Steven Matz, pitcher for the St. Louis Cardinals of Major League Baseball
- Evelina Mount, painter
- R.A. the Rugged Man, hip-hop artist
- Cliff Robertson, actor
- Jim Simons, mathematician and hedge-fund manager
- Louis Simpson, Pulitzer Prize poet
- Robert R. Sokal (1925–2012), biological anthropologist and biostatistician
- Koyo (band), musicians, band

== See also ==
- New York State Route 25A (North Country Road)
- Stony Brook University Hospital
