= William Sidney Mount House =

Historic house in New York, United States

- William Sydney Mount House
- U.S. National Register of Historic Places
- U.S. National Historic Landmark
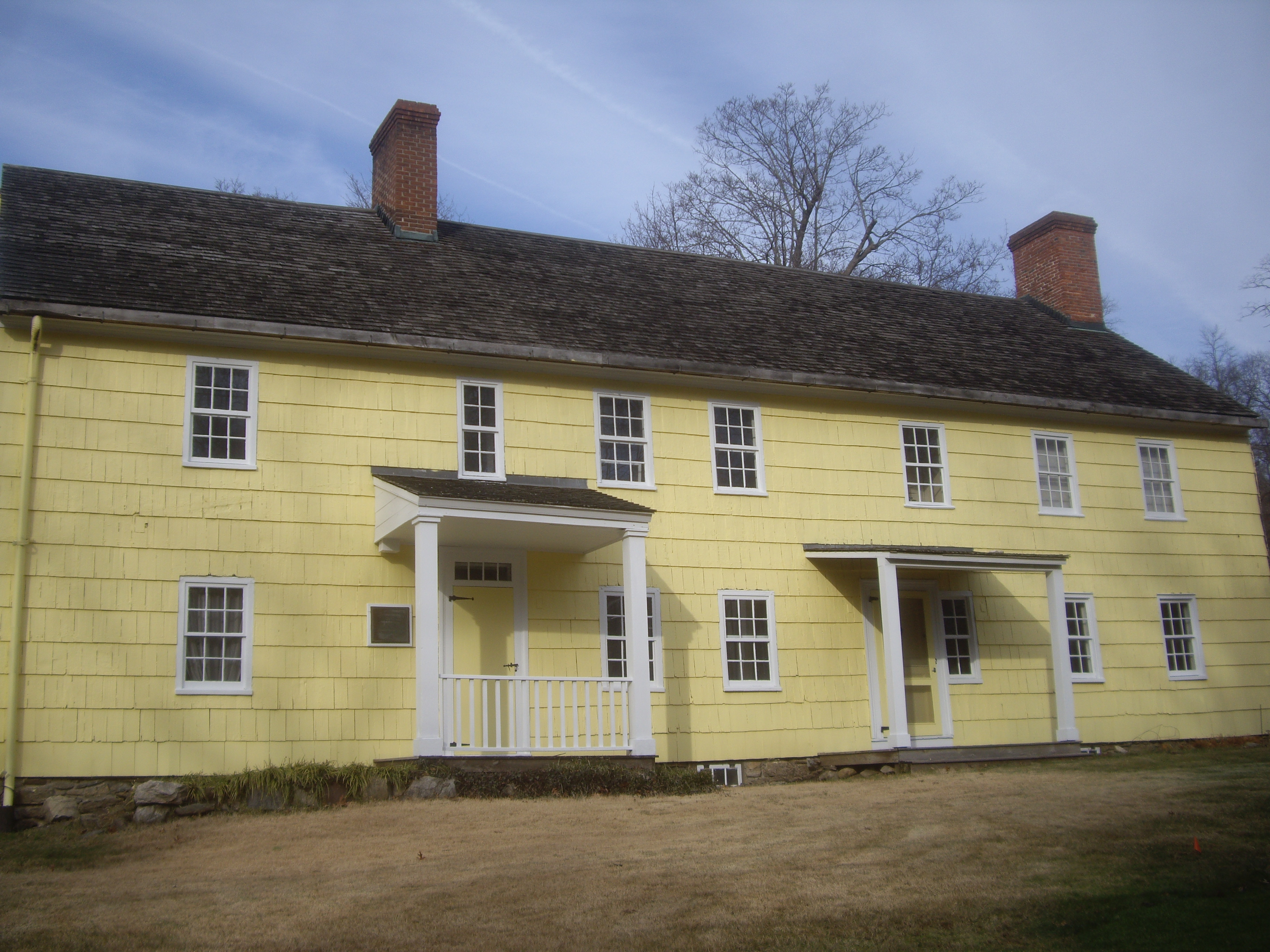

- Location within New York Location within the United States
- Location: 1556 Stony Brook Road, Stony Brook, Long Island, NY
- Coordinates: 40°54′26.62″N 73°8′17.83″W
- Area: 2.3 acres (0.93 ha)
- Built: 1725 and 1807
- Architect: Eleazar Hawkins
- NRHP reference No.: 66000575

Significant dates
- Added to NRHP: October 15, 1966
- Designated NHL: December 21, 1965

The William Sidney Mount House is a historic house at 1556 Stony Brook Road in Stony Brook, New York. Built in 1725 and enlarged in 1810, it was designated a National Historic Landmark in 1965 as the lifelong home of artist William Sidney Mount (1807–1868). The house is now owned by the Long Island Museum and is occasionally opened for tours.

== Description and history ==
The William Sidney Mount House is located west of the campus of Stony Brook University, at the northeast corner of North Country Road (New York State Route 25A) and Stony Brook Road. It is a 2 1/2-story wood-frame structure, with a gabled roof and shingled exterior. Its main facade is a broad seven bays in width, with two entrances and windows placed somewhat irregularly. One brick chimney pierces the roof behind the main entrance, and a second stands against the far right facade. The main entrance is sheltered by a shed-roof porch and has a four-light transom window. Single-story ells extend to the rear (north) of the main structure.

The interior of the house has more than twenty rooms. The most notable of these are its original kitchen, which has been restored, and the attic level, which housed the studio of American genre painter William Sidney Mount.

The oldest portion of the house is the left half of the main block, which was built in 1725 by Eleazer Hawkins, the grandfather of William Sidney Mount. Hawkins built it as an "ordinary" or tavern, whose kitchen is now preserved. About 1810 the house was enlarged, by either attaching an existing structure or building a new addition to the right side. The house was sold out of the Mount family in 1918.

William Sidney Mount was born in this house, and occupied it for most of his productive life. His work was widely popular for its depictions of country life, and he was one of the first American artists to receive significant notice abroad.

== See also ==
- List of National Historic Landmarks in New York
