= William Sidney Mount =

19th-century American genre painter

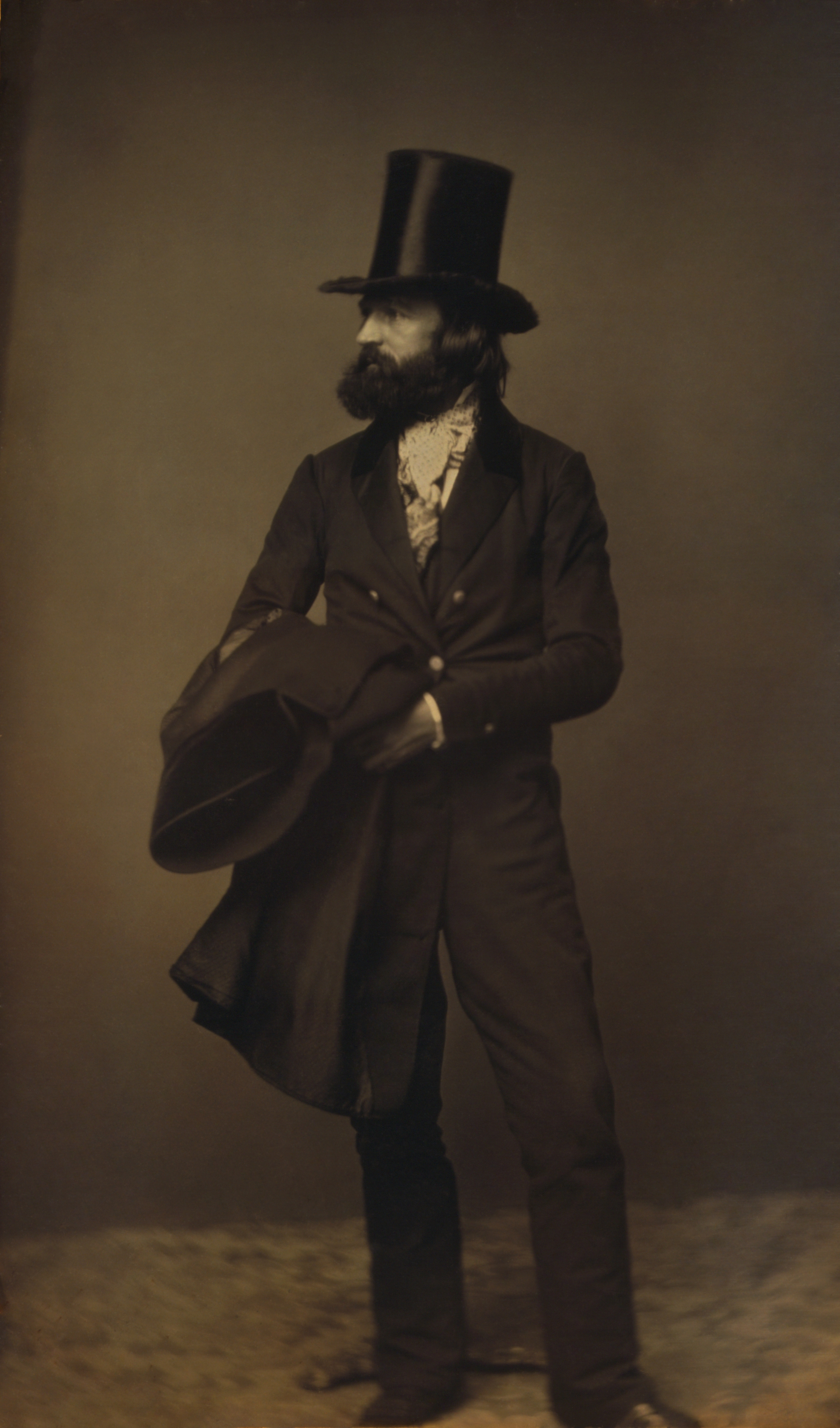
- Daguerreotype photograph of Mount by Mathew B. Brady, c. 1855
- Born: November 26, 1807; Setauket, New York
- Died: November 19, 1868 (aged 60); Setauket, New York
- Known for: Genre, landscape, portrait painting, and violin design

William Sidney Mount (November 26, 1807 – November 19, 1868) was a 19th-century American genre painter. Born in Setauket, New York in 1807, Mount spent much of his life in his hometown and the adjacent village of Stony Brook, where he painted portraits, landscapes, and scenes inspired by daily life from the 1820s until his death in 1868 at the age of sixty. During that time he achieved fame in the U.S. and Europe as a painter who chronicled rural life on Long Island. He was the first native-born American artist to specialize in genre painting. Mount was also passionate about music and a fiddle player, a composer and collector of songs, symphonies, sonatas and other works, and designed and patented several versions of his own violin which he named the "Cradle of Harmony." Many of his paintings also feature musicians and groups of people engaged in dance in rural settings.

== Biography ==
=== Early life ===
Mount was born November 26, 1807, in the village of Setauket, New York, on the north shore of eastern Long Island to parents Julia Ann Hawkins (1782–1841) and Thomas Shephard Mount (1778–1814). Mount's parents operated a farm, as well as a store and tavern that bordered the village green in Setauket. Thomas and Julia had eight children. Five survived childbirth: Henry Smith Mount (1802–1841), Shepard Alonzo Mount (1804–1868), Robert Nelson Mount (1806–1883), William Sidney Mount (1807–1868), and Ruth Hawkins Mount (1808–1888).

At around seven months old, Mount was believed to be close to death when a home nurse noticed his health was failing. His aunt, who came to make funeral arrangements, saw signs of life still in Mount and restored him back to health.

After his father's death in 1814, Mount was sent to live with his uncle and aunt, Micah (1777–1825) and Letty (c. 1777 – 1835) Hawkins in New York City while his mother moved back to her father's home in Stony Brook. His Uncle Micah was an established composer, playwright, mimic, and poet who played the piano, flute, and violin, who helped inspire Mount's passion for music. Mount returned to his grandfather's farm in 1815, where he stayed until moving back to New York City to work as an apprentice in his older brother Henry's sign and ornamental painting business where he cultivated his artistic skills.

=== Education and training ===
Under his brother Henry's encouragement, Mount attended the American Academy of the Fine Arts exhibition in City Hall Park in 1825, an event that had a profound impact on him. This first exhibition introduced Mount to prominent seventeenth- and eighteenth-century European artists, like well-known artist Benjamin West who excelled at depicting subject from biblical history and would inspire Mount to focus his attention on becoming a history painter. Instead of seeking formal education and/or an apprenticeship under a successful painter, Mount decided to educate himself while still working for his older brother who had entered a partnership with another sign painter, William Inslee. Inslee owned a large set of engravings by the British artist William Hogarth. Mount avidly set about copying the Hogarth prints, as a way to further his artistic skill.

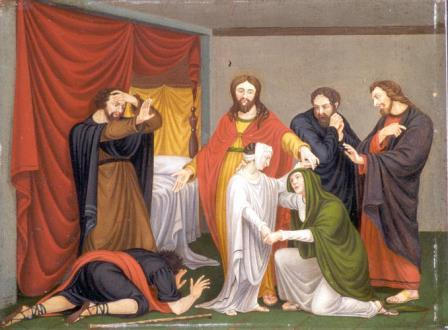
William Sidney Mount, Christ Raising the Daughter of Jairus, 1828, painting.

When another family friend, Martin E. Thompson, saw Mount's renditions/drawings, he recommended that he enroll as a student at the newly formed National Academy of Design, of which Thompson was a founding member. Mount enrolled in drawing classes and continued to excel in his artistic skills until he returned to Stony Brook several years later; works Mount exhibited at the Academy were met with great appreciation and high regard helping inspire him to keep painting and creating.

== Career ==
=== History paintings ===
Influenced by classically trained artists, Mount's initial artistic desire was to become a historical painter. Inspired by Benjamin West and William Hogarth, as noted above, Mount was enamored with the Grand Manner and the lofty styles of these artists. Striving to create his own success, Mount produced a number of historical paintings often selected from scenes in classical texts that represented death, resurrection, or near-death experiences.

Mount's first major oil painting, Christ Raising the Daughter of Jairus (1828), which depicts the moment described in the New Testament Book of Mark when Christ commands the young girl to arise from the dead and walk, created a sensation when it was exhibited at the National Academy of Design. The council could not believe an artist of his age and lack of formal training could produce such a profound work. Although the originality of the painting was questioned, the conception of the piece was entirely Mount's own. Despite Mount's success with historical painting, he ultimately was forced to abandon them due to a desperate need for funds.

=== Portraiture ===
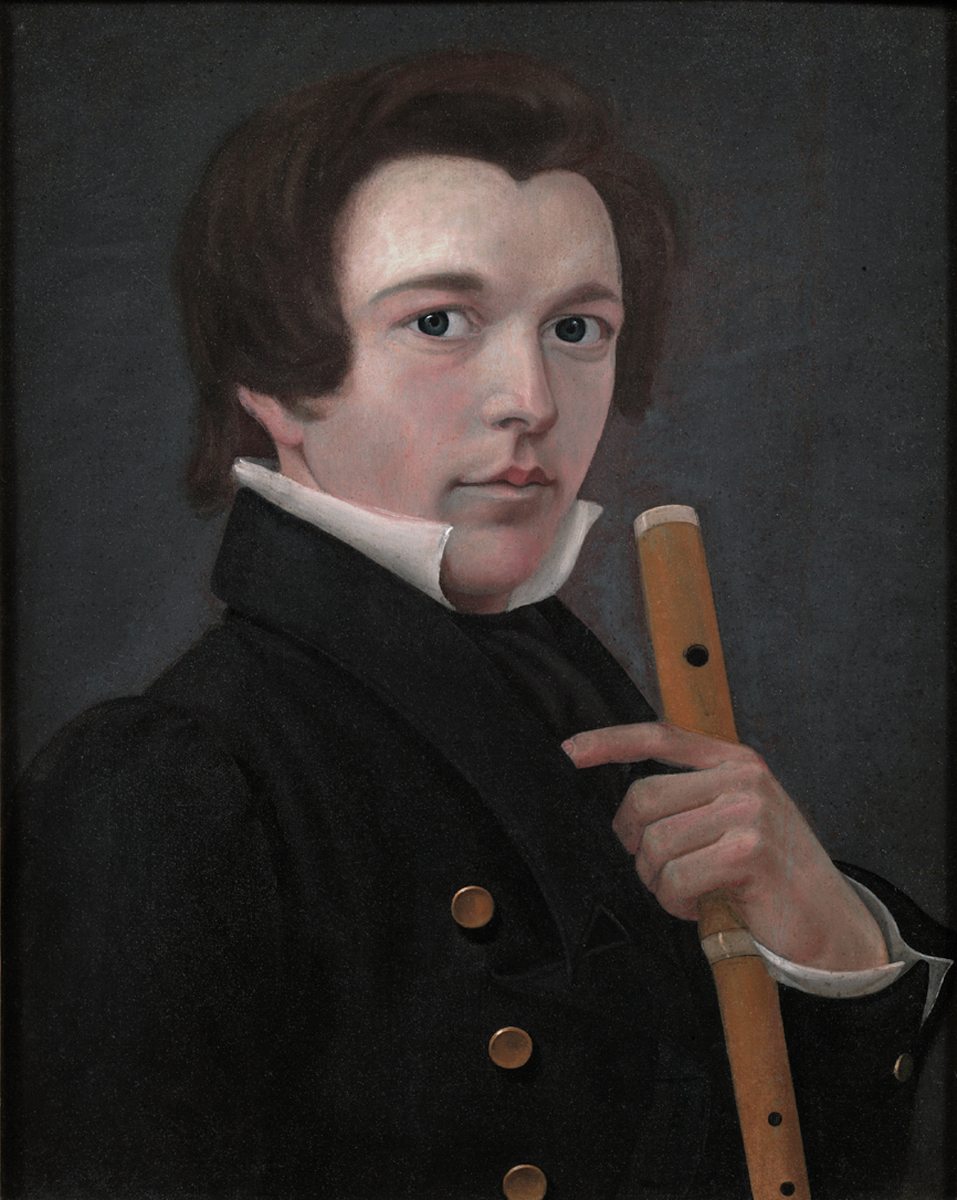
William Sidney Mount, Self Portrait with Flute, 1828.

Leaving history paintings behind, Mount found great success and much needed funds in portraits.

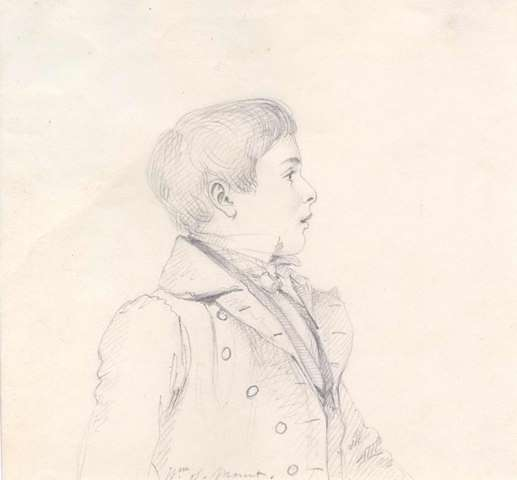
William Sidney Mount, Portrait of a Boy, 1837.

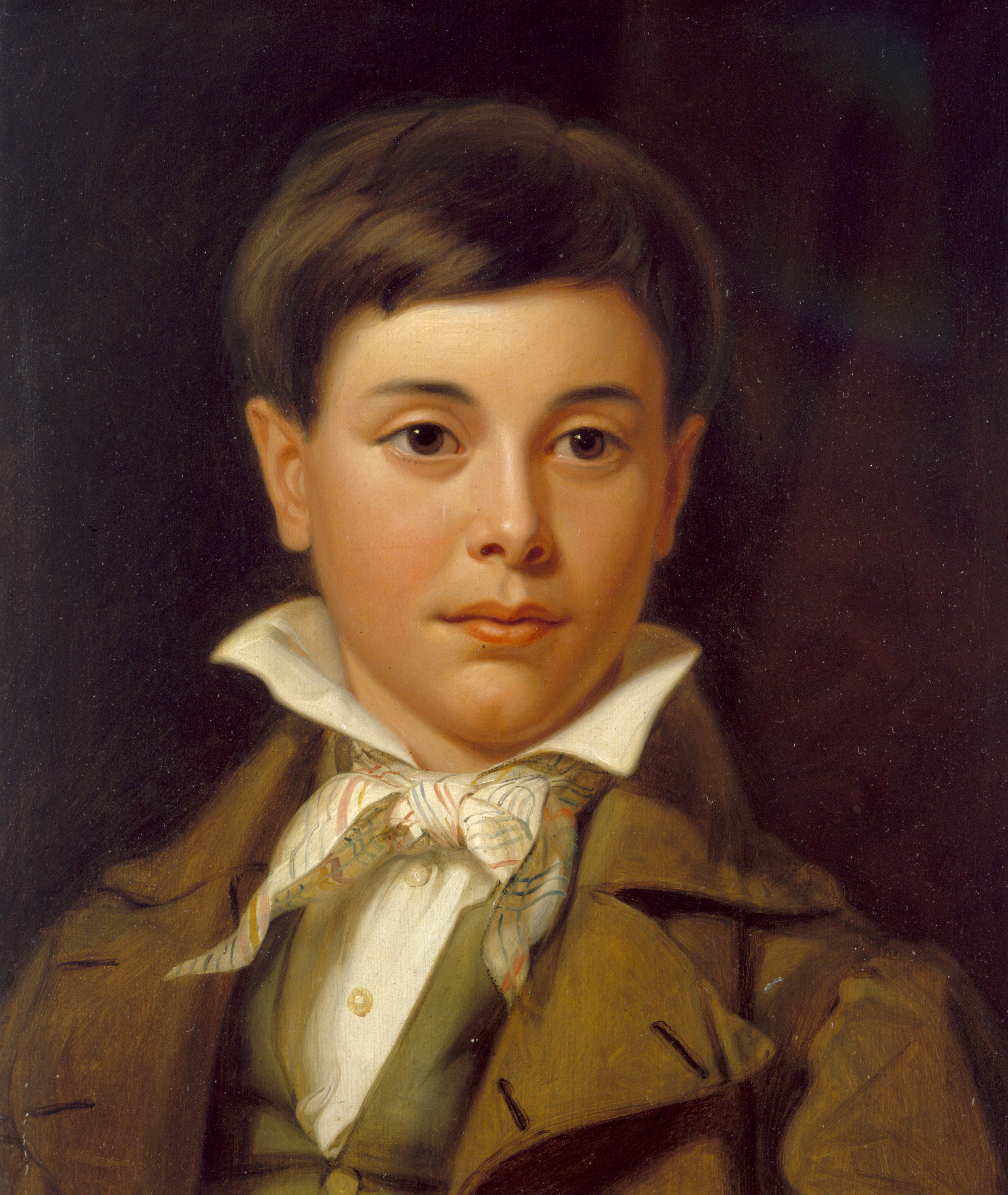
William Sidney Mount, Jedediah Williamson, 1837.

Mount's first subjects were himself, having painted his first self-portrait in the spring of 1828, and his close family members including his brother Henry, sister Ruth Mount Seabury, and nephew Charles Edward Seabury. He painted his first commissioned portrait later that year. Mount wrote in his autobiography “I found that portraits improved my colouring, and for pleasurable practice in that department I retired into the country to paint the mugs of Long Island Yeomanry.” Also that year, William and his brother, Shepard Alonzo Mount decided to open a portrait studio at 15 Cherry Street in New York City. Sadly, business was poor and they closed the studio in 1829. But Mount's portrait work continued for the remainder of his career and life.

In the early years, some of Mount's more prominent Long Island patrons were members of the Wells, Weeks, Mills, and Strong families. Often, Mount was commissioned to paint posthumous mourning portraits, or portraits done after death. The subjects of these paintings are often depicted “alive” with symbols/settings representing death being incorporated which often included flowers and/or bodies of water. In general, Mount did not enjoy these commissions, due to the morbid nature of the projects and the difficulty of working with surviving loved ones. For certain portraits, such as Jedediah Williamson in 1837, Mount would be called to the scene of his subject's death or wake, to take detailed sketches and notes for his paintings. While Jedediah was tragically run-over by a loaded wagon, the final project created by Mount leaves out the gruesome manner of his death, allowing his family to remembering him without being reminded of how he died. Through the art of posthumous portraits, the dead could be restored to their relatives eternally preserved.

=== Genre ===
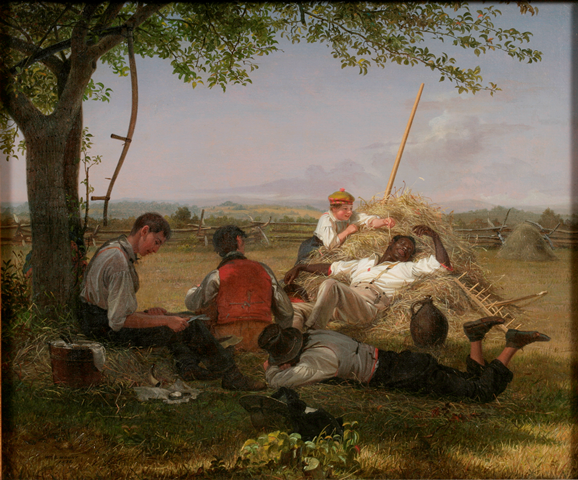
William Sidney Mount, Farmer's Nooning, 1838.

Mount's greatest success and what he is most famed for are his genre paintings which unlike his early historical paintings centered on death, typically focused on daily experiences that viewers could identify with. Mount was one of the first artists to specialize in the American rural social scene; before his time there existed a certain feeling among artists that the daily life of rural America was not worthy of their high calling.

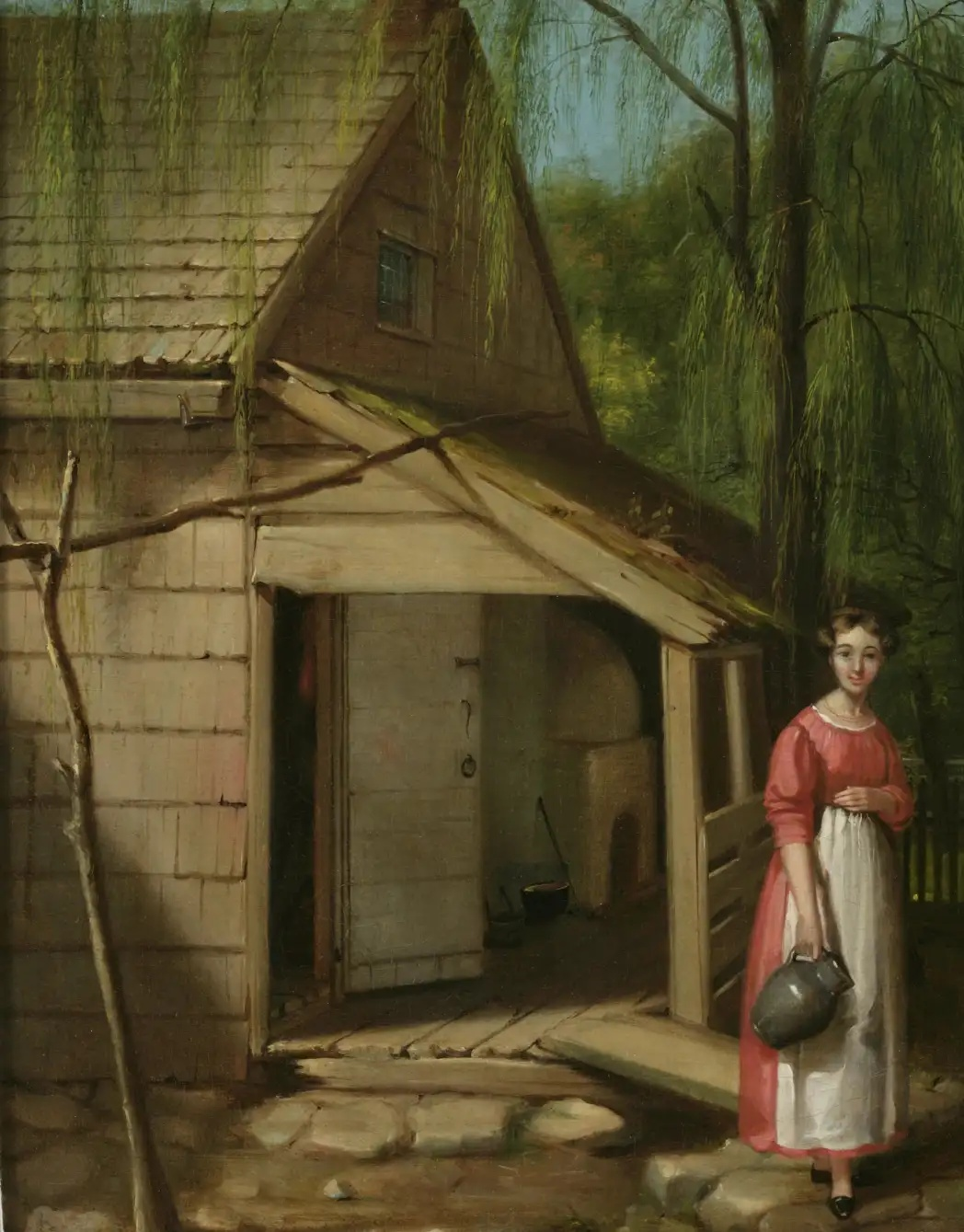
William Sidney Mount, Girl with Pitcher, 1829, painting.

Mount was encouraged to pursue genre painting by the enthusiastic reception his initial efforts received at the National Academy in New York. His first success in genre painting was the multi-figural Rustic Dance After a Sleigh Ride, shown at the 1830 National Academy exhibition along with his Girl with a Pitcher, 1829.

== Music and Mount ==
Not only was Mount's love of music and dance represented in his paintings, but also was evident in his other preoccupations. Coming from a family of musically talented individuals, Mount grew up surrounded by music. Beyond providing subject matter, music gave Mount another outlet that he pursued as a fiddler, a fife player, a collector of folk songs, and a violin designer. Mount performed at dances and in concerts and avidly collected hundreds of tunes which he would then share with musically inclined family and friends. Some of which were by Beethoven, Mozart, Rossini, Schubert, Mendelssohn, Donizetti and one of his idols Nicolo Paganini.

=== Cradle of Harmony ===
Cradle of Harmony, created by William Sidney Mount, 1852.

Mount's fiddle performances for country dances convinced him there was a need for a violin that would project its sound loudly enough to be heard over the noise of the crowd. He also aimed to design a violin that had fewer parts than normal so that it could be manufactured more efficiently and affordably. Mount patented a hollow-backed violin, which he named the “Cradle of Harmony” in 1852. Mount experimented with various violin shapes and modifications for the rest of his life, with four different versions existing today. He displayed the instruments publicly and demonstrated one at the New York Crystal Palace Exposition in 1853.

== Spiritualism ==
In the early 1850s, Mount showed an intense interest in spiritualism. He attended several spiritual conferences, participated in séances and table knockings, met some of the leading figures of the movement, and attempted to contact many spirits on his own. In his writings, Mount claims to have been in contact with his uncle Micah Hawkins, who answered questions about his deceased mother, brother Henry, and other relatives. Mount's journal, dubbed the Spirit Journal (now in the collection of the Long Island Museum of American Art, History, and Carriages), is his own personal recording of Spiritualism in his life. The work records his interests in—and his reactions to—Spiritualism. It offers insights into how these ideas affected his outlook on the world having grown up with Christian faith. The entries in the journal are dated from 1854 to 1855, when Spiritualism was at its height, and when Mount was seeking answers that he could not find elsewhere.

== Legacy ==
William Sidney Mount never married or had children. His family home, surrounding property, and various outbuildings in Stony Brook became a National Historic Landmark dubbed the William Sidney Mount House in 1965. The site is at the corner of Stony Brook Road and New York State Route 25A.

Mount fell ill while on a trip to New York City to tend to the affairs of his recently deceased brother, Shepard Alonzo Mount. Mount quickly returned to his brother Robert Nelson Mount's (1806–1883) house in Setauket, where he died of pneumonia, November 18, 1868. He is buried in Setauket Presbyterian Church and Burial Ground in Setauket.

== Notable collections ==
Mount's work can also be found in many collections around the United States, including the Metropolitan Museum of Art, the Brooklyn Museum of Art, The New-York Historical Society, the Museum of Fine Arts, Boston, the Nelson-Atkins Museum of Art, Yale University Art Gallery, the Art Institute of Chicago, and the Cleveland Museum of Art, among others. The Long Island Museum of American Art, History, and Carriages owns the largest repository of Mount artwork and archival material.

== Gallery ==
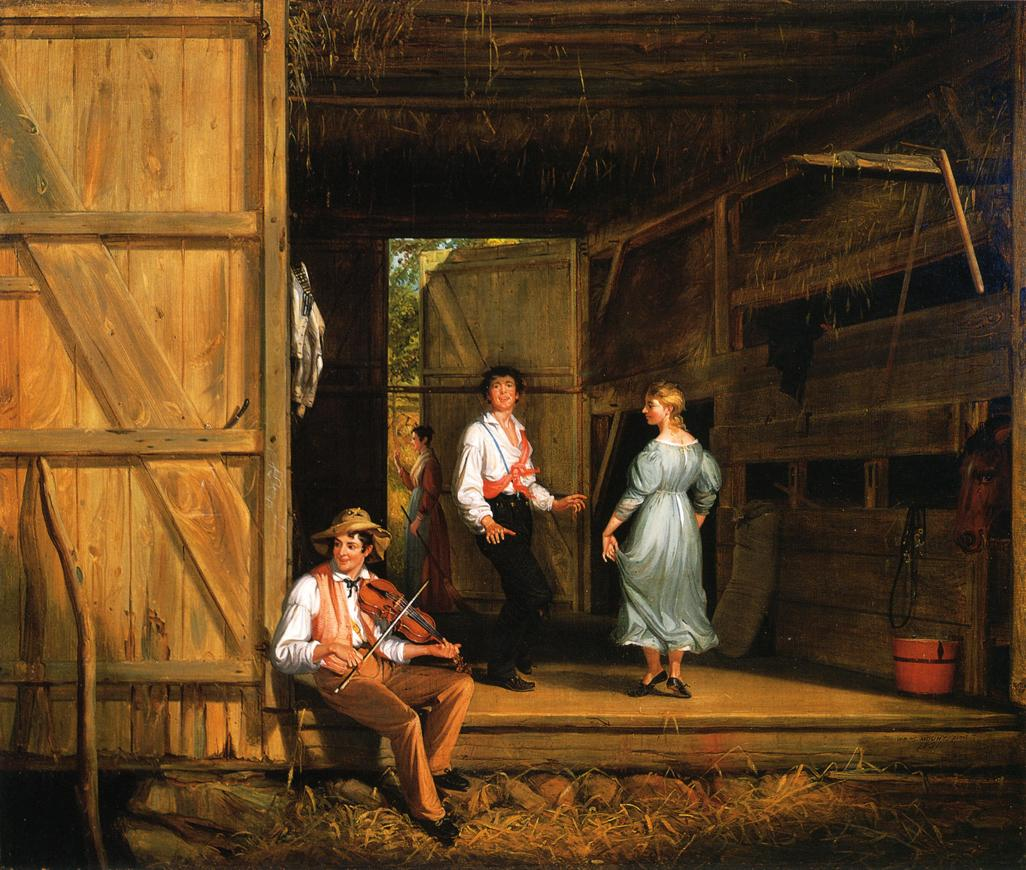
Dancing on the Barn Floor, 1831

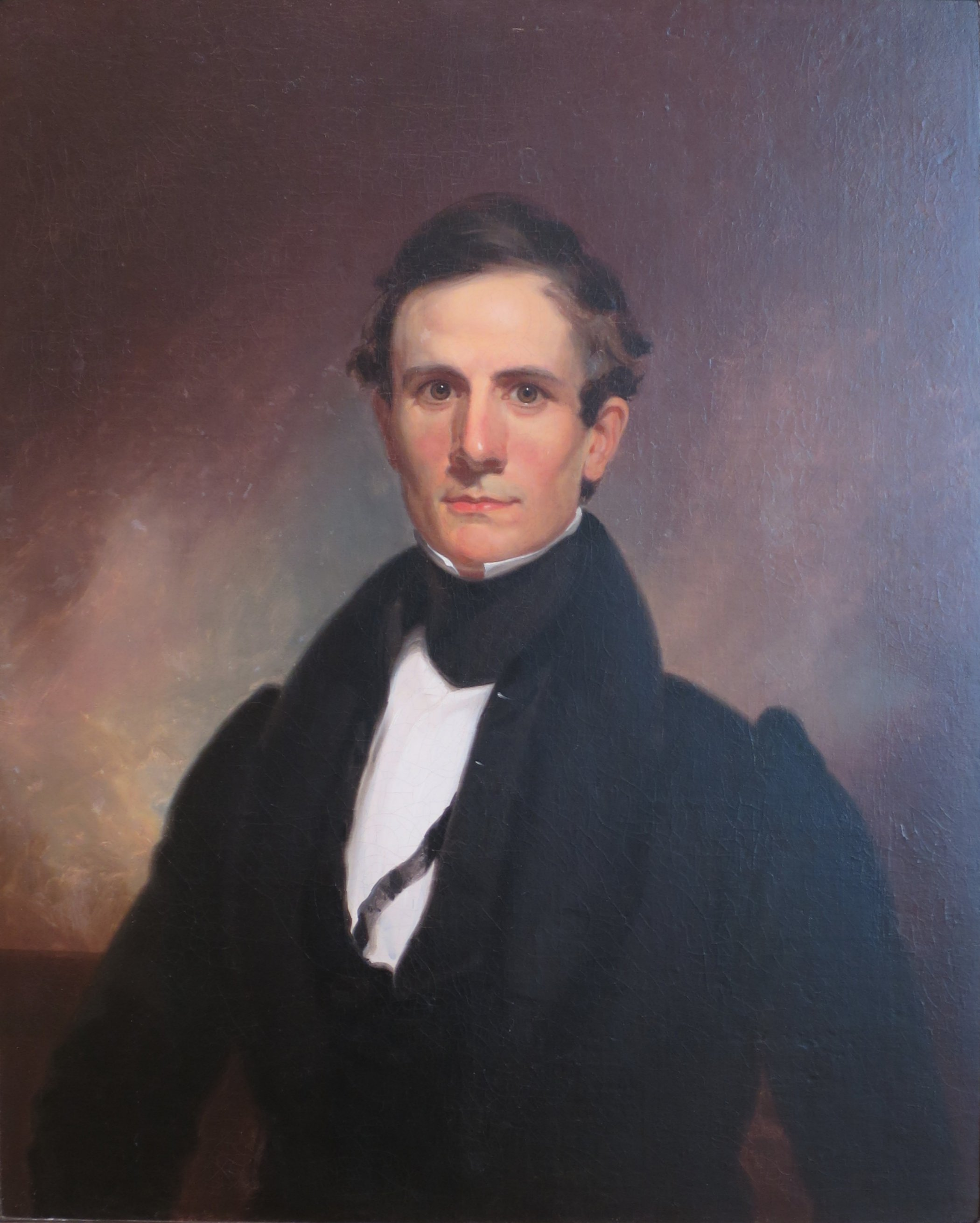
Portrait of Laertes Chapin, 1833

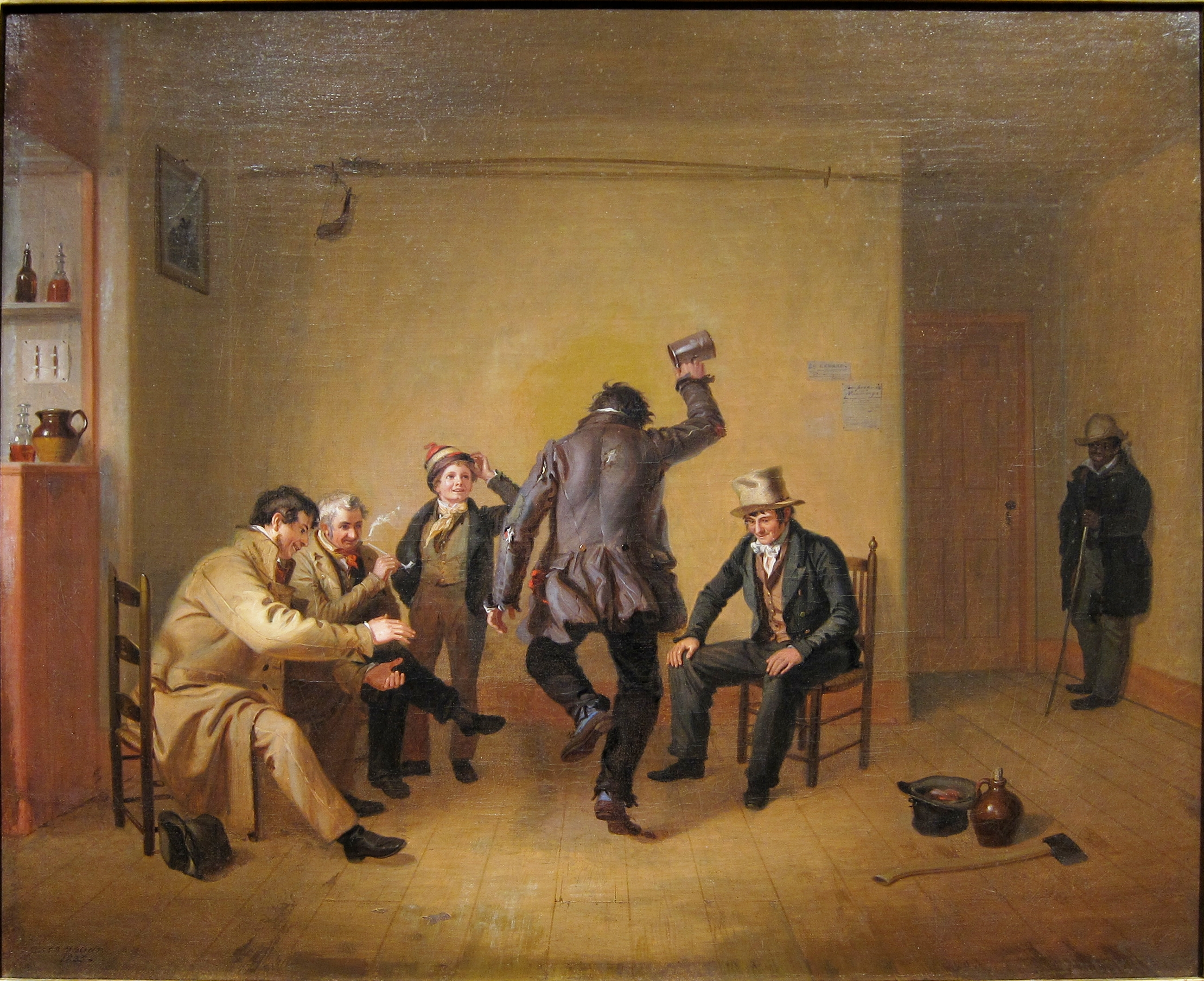
Bar-room scene, 1835

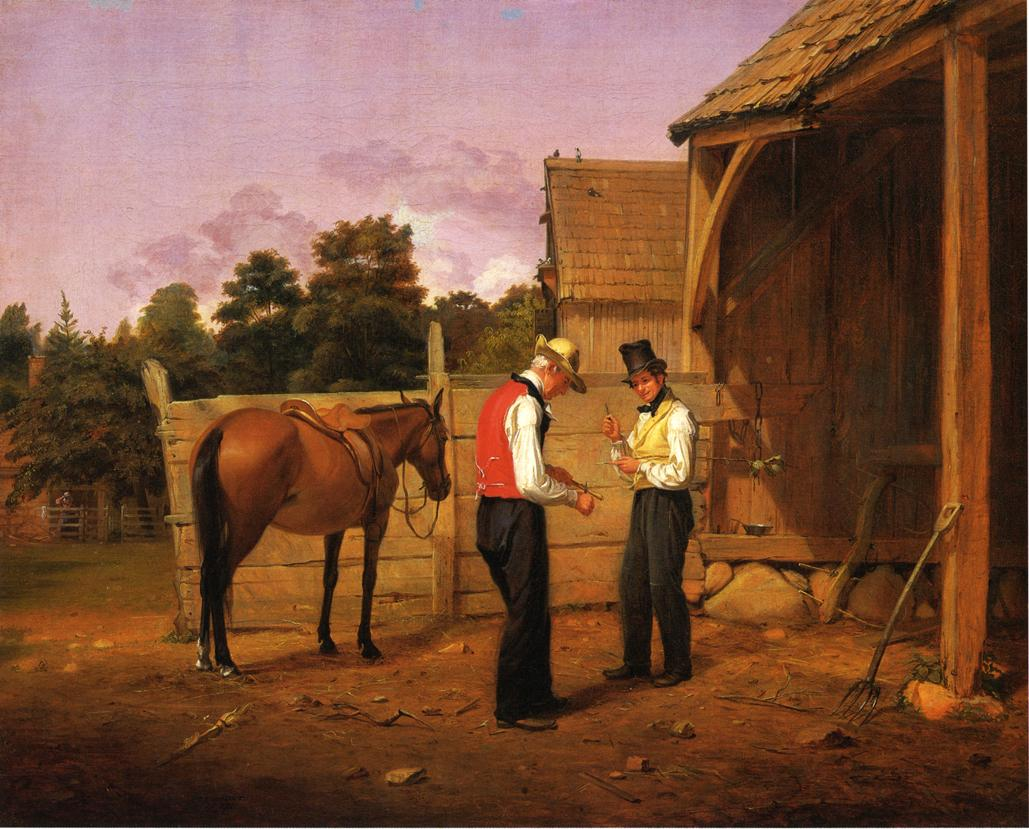
Bargaining for a Horse, 1835

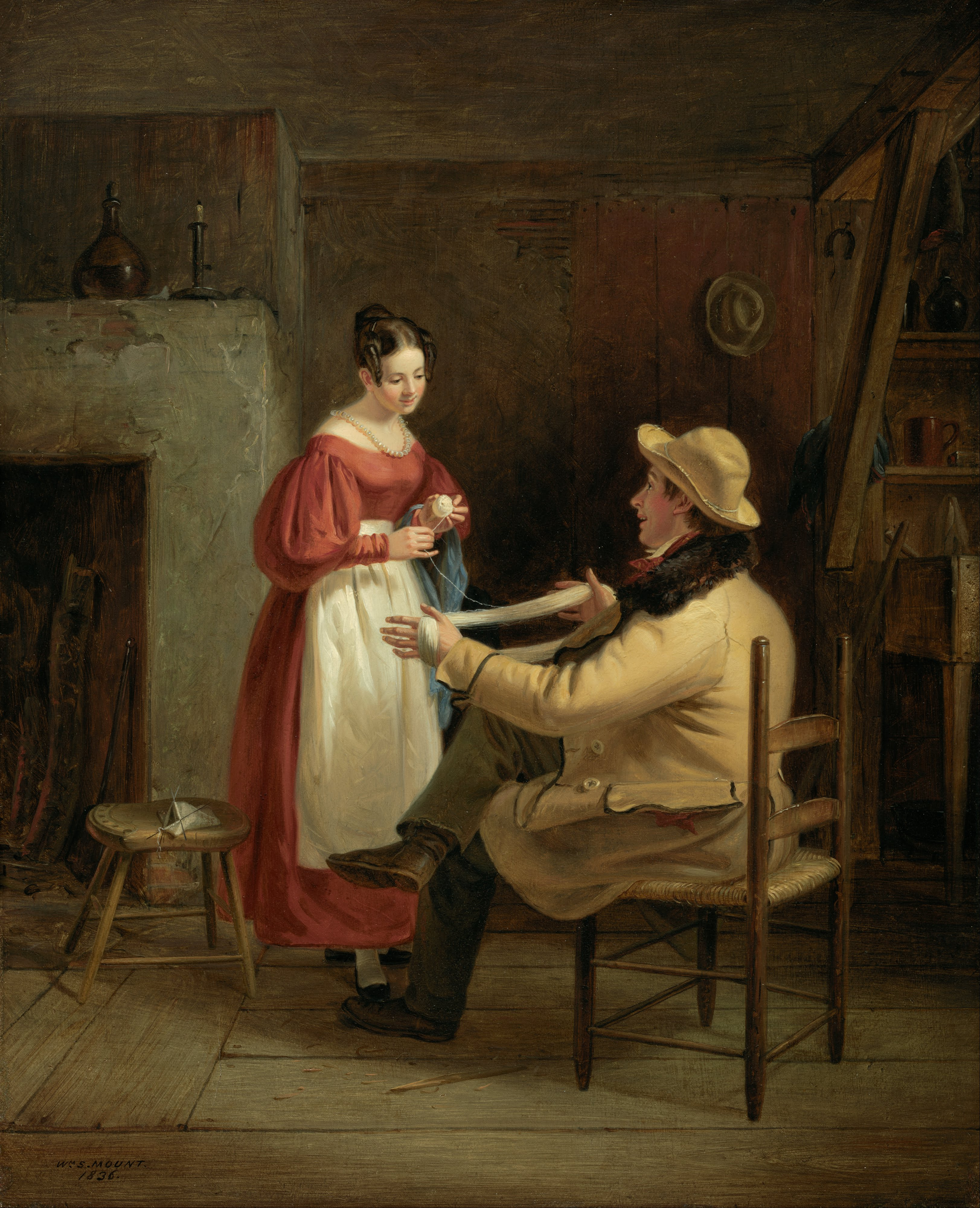
Winding Up, 1836

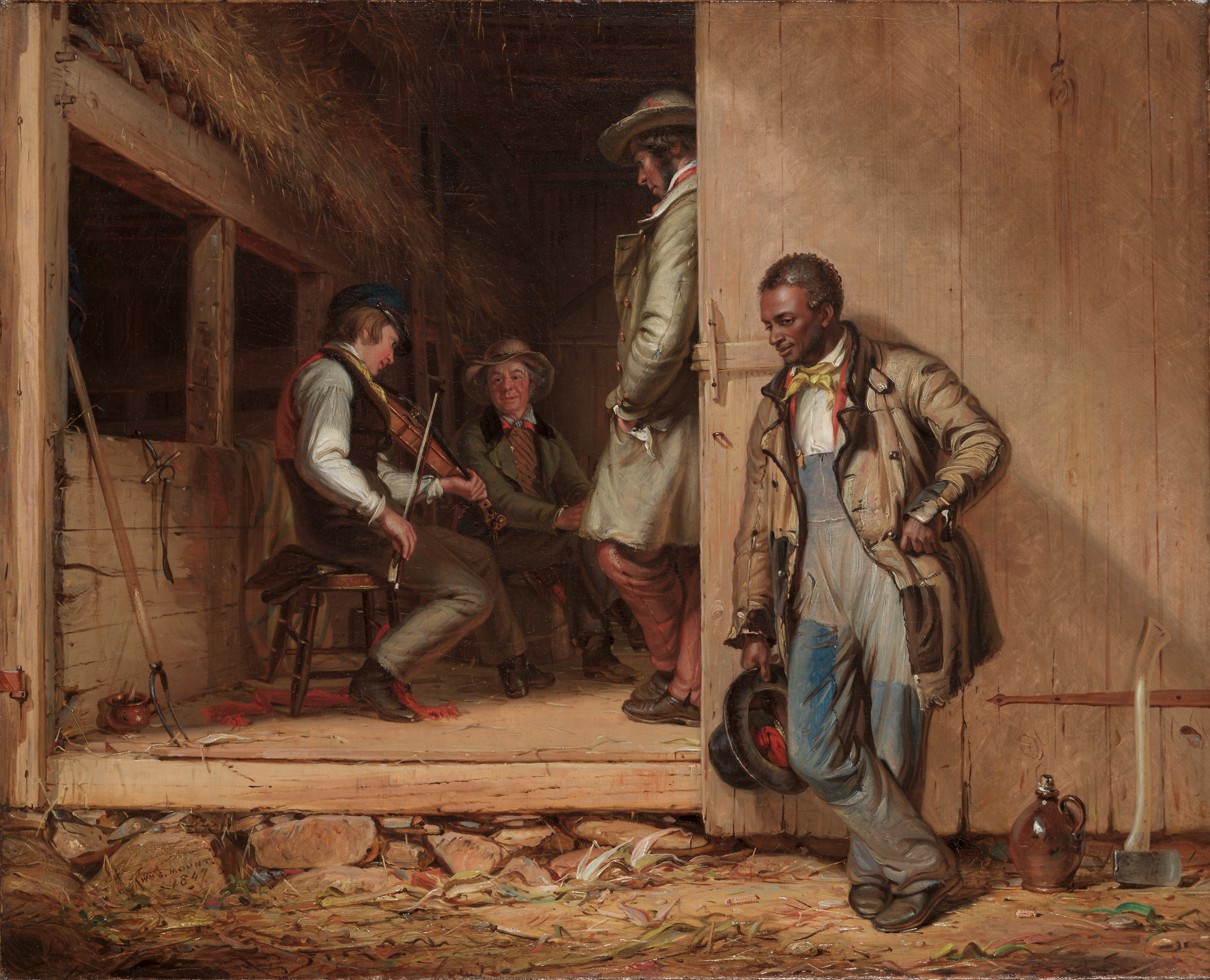
The Power of Music, 1847

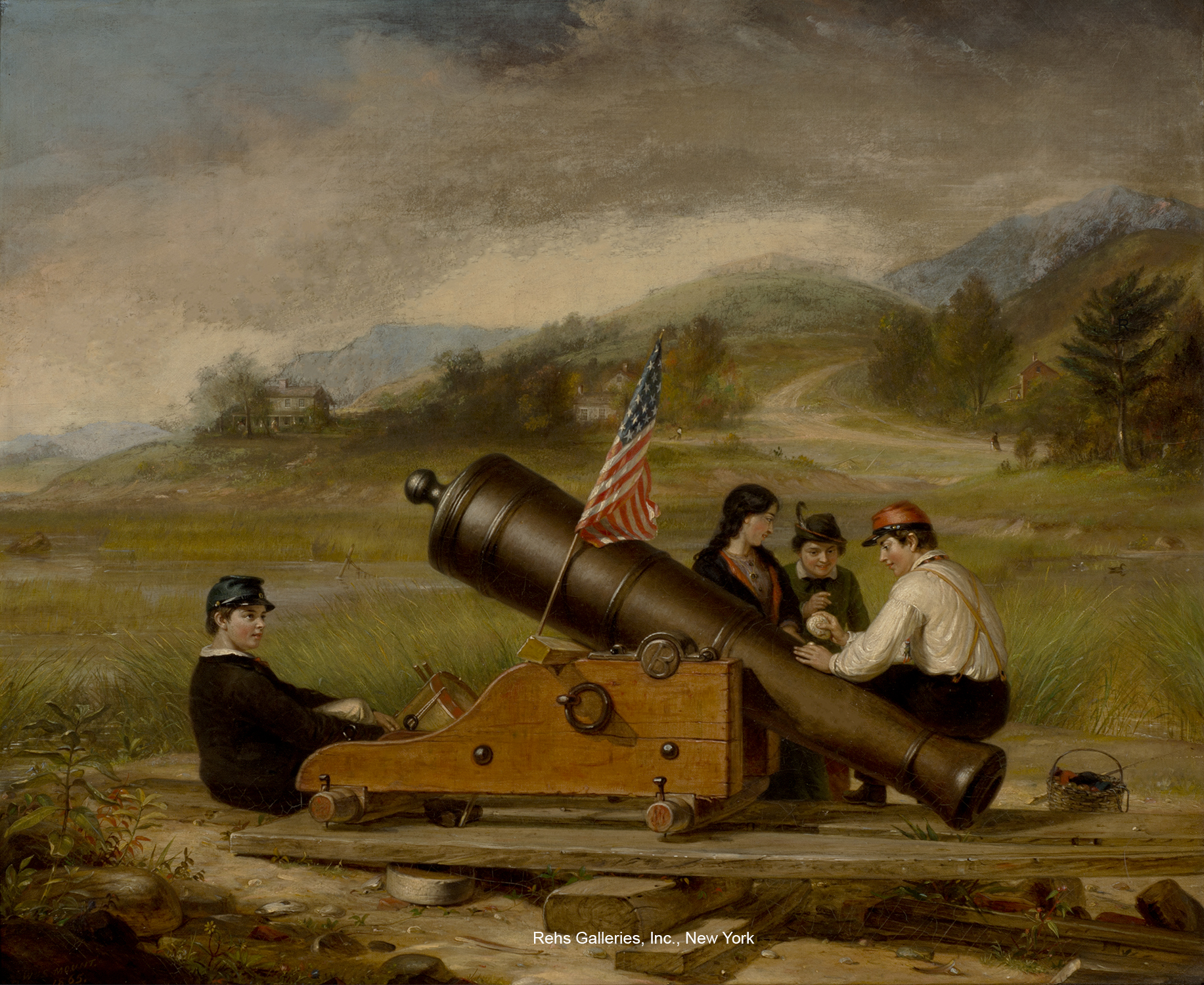
Muzzle Down / Peace, 1865, Rehs Galleries, Inc.
