= Wedding of Prince William and Catherine Middleton =

2011 British royal wedding

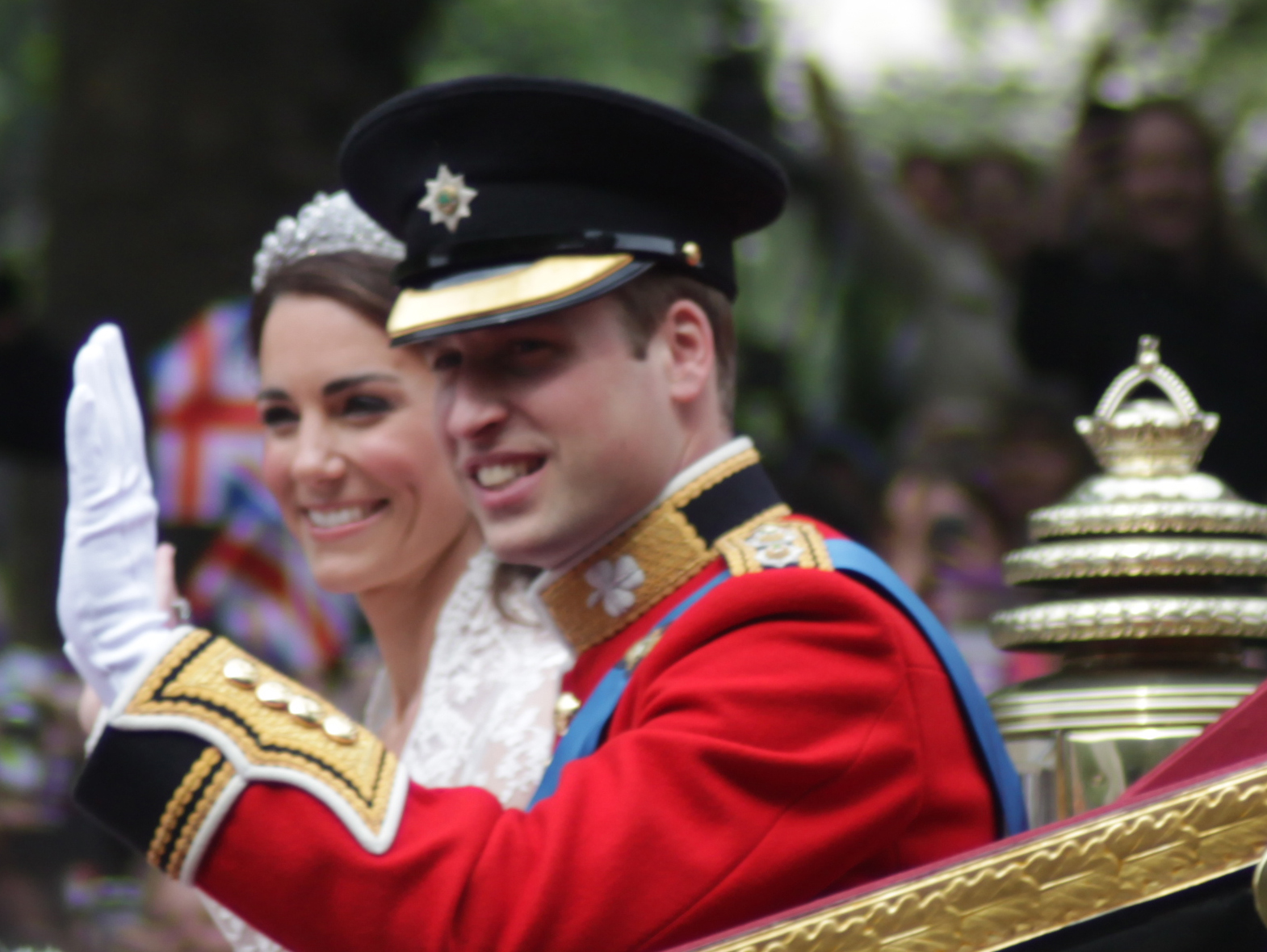
- William (right) and Catherine waving to the crowd at The Mall shortly after their wedding
- Date: 29 April 2011; 15 years ago
- Venue: Westminster Abbey
- Location: London, England
- Participants: Prince William; Catherine Middleton

The wedding of Prince William and Catherine Middleton took place on Friday, 29 April 2011 at Westminster Abbey in London, England. William was second in the line of succession to the British throne at the time, later becoming heir apparent. The couple had been in a relationship since 2003.

John Hall, Dean of Westminster, presided at the service; Rowan Williams, Archbishop of Canterbury, conducted the marriage; Richard Chartres, Bishop of London, preached the sermon; and a reading was given by Catherine's brother James. William's best man was his brother Prince Harry, while Catherine's sister Pippa was the maid of honour. The ceremony was attended by the bride's and groom's families, as well as members of foreign royal families, diplomats, and the couple's chosen personal guests. After the ceremony, the couple made the traditional appearance on the balcony of Buckingham Palace. As William was not the heir apparent to the throne at the time, the wedding was not a full state occasion, and details such as much of the guest list of about 1,900 were left for the couple to decide.

William and Catherine first met in 2001. Their engagement, which took place on 20 October 2010, was announced on 16 November 2010. The build-up to the wedding and the occasion itself attracted much media attention, being compared in many ways with the wedding of William's parents in 1981. The occasion was made a public holiday in the United Kingdom and featured many ceremonial aspects, including use of the state carriages and roles for the Foot Guards and Household Cavalry. Events were held around the Commonwealth to mark the wedding; organisations and hotels held events across Canada, over 5,000 street parties were held throughout the United Kingdom, and about a million people lined the route between Westminster Abbey and Buckingham Palace on the wedding day. The ceremony was viewed live by tens of millions more around the world, including 72 million live streams on YouTube. In the United Kingdom, television audiences peaked at 26.3 million viewers, with 36.7 million watching at least part of the coverage.

== Engagement announcement ==
Prince William and Catherine Middleton first met in 2001 while studying at the University of St Andrews. They began dating in 2003. On 16 November 2010, Clarence House stated that William was to marry Catherine "in the Spring or Summer of 2011, in London". They were engaged in October 2010, while on a private holiday in Kenya; William gave Middleton the same engagement ring that his father had given to William's mother, Diana, Princess of Wales—an 18-karat white gold ring with a 12-carat oval Ceylon (Sri Lankan) sapphire and 14 round diamonds. It was announced at approximately the same time that, after their marriage, the couple would live on the Isle of Anglesey in Wales, where William was based with the Royal Air Force.

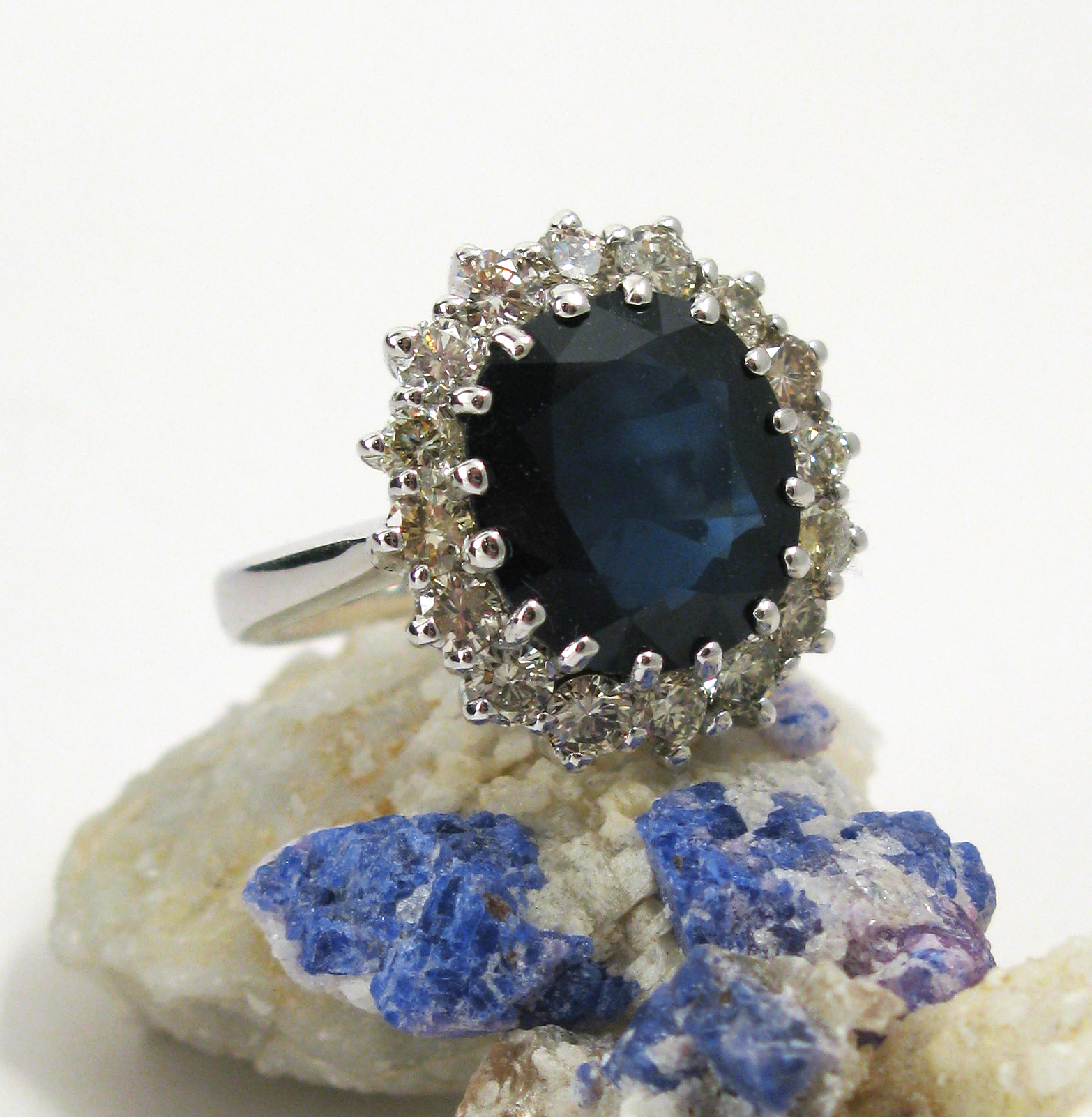
A replica of Catherine's engagement ring

The Queen said she was "absolutely delighted" for the couple, giving her formal consent to the marriage, as required by the since-repealed Royal Marriages Act 1772, in her British privy council on the morning of the engagement. Congratulations also came in from the Queen's prime ministers, including Julia Gillard, Prime Minister of Australia, who had at other times demonstrated moderate republican leanings. The suffragan Bishop of Willesden, Pete Broadbent, who also has republican views, published a critical reaction to the wedding announcement on Facebook. He later acknowledged that his words were "offensive" and apologised, but his superior, Richard Chartres, Bishop of London, instructed him to withdraw from public ministry "until further notice".

Following the announcement, the couple gave an exclusive interview to ITV News political editor Tom Bradby and hosted a photocall at St James's Palace. On 12 December 2010, Buckingham Palace issued the official engagement photographs; these were taken on 25 November, in the state apartments at St. James's Palace, by photographer Mario Testino.

On 23 November 2010, the date of the ceremony was confirmed as Friday, 29 April 2011. The Queen in her British Council ordered on 15 December 2010 that the wedding day would be a public holiday throughout the United Kingdom. It was also declared an official public holiday in the British Overseas Territories of Bermuda, the Cayman Islands, Gibraltar, the Falkland Islands, Montserrat, and the Turks and Caicos, and the British Crown Dependencies of Guernsey, Jersey, and the Isle of Man. As 29 April fell six days before elections for the Scottish Parliament and the Alternative Vote referendum, this attracted political comment. John Curtice, a professor of politics at the University of Strathclyde, stated for the Scottish elections that the date was "unfortunate" and was "likely to see the Royal Family getting caught up in political debate".

Middleton, who was christened as a child, decided to be confirmed into the Church of England preceding her wedding. The confirmation service was conducted on 10 March at St James's Palace by the Bishop of London with her family and William in attendance. TV programmes were also shown in the UK prior to the wedding which provided deeper insights into the couple's relationship and backgrounds, including When Kate Met William and Channel 4's Meet the Middletons.

== Planning ==
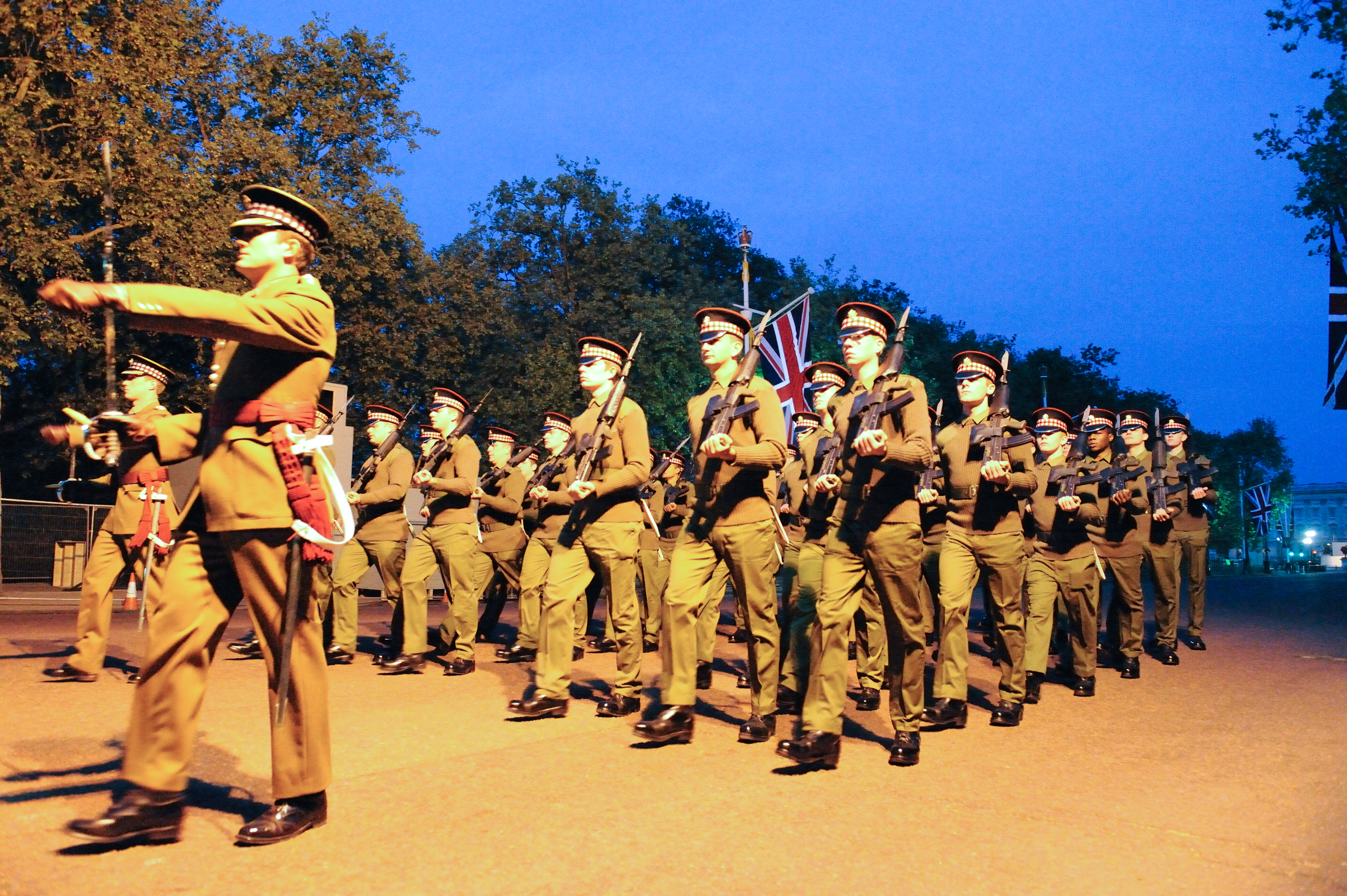
Soldiers in non-dress uniforms during the rehearsal for the wedding on 27 April

On 5 January, St James's Palace publicised that the ceremony would start at 11:00 British Summer Time (BST) and that Catherine would arrive at the abbey by car rather than by carriage, the traditional transport for royal brides. The route planned was along The Mall, through Horse Guards Parade, and down Whitehall to the abbey. Some roads in central London were closed; Transport for London issued travel advice and information on road closures.

=== Cost ===
The costs of the wedding itself were borne by the Royal Family and the Middletons, and the costs of security and transport were covered by Her Majesty's Treasury. The couple also asked that donations be made to charities in place of traditional wedding gifts; to that end, they established The Prince William and Miss Catherine Middleton Charitable Gift Fund, which focused on assisting charities such as the New Zealand Christchurch Earthquake Appeal, the Canadian Coast Guard Auxiliary, the Royal Flying Doctor Service, and the Zoological Society of London.

The overall cost of the event was estimated to have been £23.7 million. The Australian newspaper Herald Sun estimated A$32 million for security and A$800,000 for flowers. Estimates of the cost to the economy of extra public holidays, such as that allowed for the wedding, vary between £1.2 billion and £6 billion. The British government tourist authority VisitBritain predicted the wedding would trigger a tourism boom that would last several years, eventually pulling in an additional 4 million visitors and generating £2 billion. However, VisitBritain's head of research and forecasting, David Edwards, suggested to colleagues two days after the engagement was announced that the evidence pointed to royal weddings having a negative impact on inbound tourism. He noted that the number of visitors to Britain was down significantly in July 1981, when Prince Charles and Diana were married, from the same period in other years, and also July 1986, when Prince Andrew and Sarah Ferguson were married, was down from July 1985.

=== Guest list ===
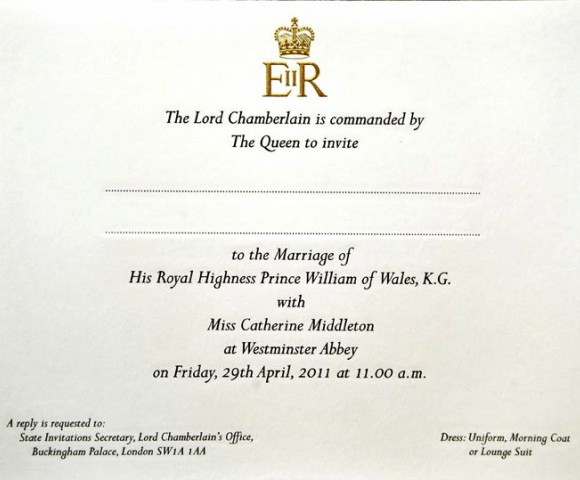
The official invitation for the royal wedding, sent by the Lord Chamberlain

On 16 and 17 February, three sets of guest lists were sent out in the name of the Queen. Many guests or their successors in office who had been invited to the wedding of William's parents were not invited to the wedding. The first list, consisting of about 1,900 people, attended the ceremony in the abbey; the second list of approximately 600 people were invited to the luncheon reception at Buckingham Palace, hosted by the Queen; and the final list, of about 300 names, was for the evening dinner, hosted by the Prince of Wales.

More than half the wedding guests were family and friends of the couple, though there were a significant number of Commonwealth leaders (including the governors-general who represent the Queen in Commonwealth realms other than the UK, prime ministers of the Commonwealth realms, and heads of government of other Commonwealth countries), members of religious organisations, the diplomatic corps, several military officials, members of the British Royal Household, members of foreign royal families, and representatives of William's charities and others with whom William has worked on official business. Although St James's Palace declined to publish the names of those invited, a breakdown of guests was published by category, though not including foreign heads of state. The invitation of Cardinal Seán Brady, Primate of All Ireland, to the event, and its acceptance, were described as "unprecedented" by a spokesman for Ireland's Catholic bishops. The spokesman attributed the invitation to Cardinal Brady's contribution to the Northern Ireland peace process.

=== Route ===
Route of William to, and the couple from, Westminster Abbey

The route of William and his party to the ceremony went between Buckingham Palace and Westminster Abbey, by The Mall, passing Clarence House, by Horse Guards Road, Horse Guards Parade, through Horse Guards Arch, Whitehall, the south side of Parliament Square, and Broad Sanctuary. After the ceremony, the bridal couple returned along the same route by carriage. At 6.00 am, roads in and around the processional route were closed to traffic. From 8.15 am, the main congregation, governors-general, prime ministers of Commonwealth realms, and diplomats arrived at the abbey.

William and Harry, who had stayed at Clarence House, left for the ceremony at 10.10 am in a Bentley State Limousine and arrived at 10.18 am, followed by representatives of foreign royal families, the Middleton family, and, lastly, the Royal Family (the Prince of Wales and the Duchess of Cornwall; the Princess Royal and Vice Admiral Timothy Laurence; the Duke of York, Princess Beatrice, and Princess Eugenie; and the Earl and Countess of Wessex). The Queen and the Duke of Edinburgh were the last members of the Royal Family to leave Buckingham Palace, as is tradition, arriving at the abbey at 10.48 am. The bridal party, which had spent the night at the Goring Hotel, left for the ceremony in the former number one state Rolls-Royce Phantom VI at 10.52 am, in time for the service to begin at 11.00 am.

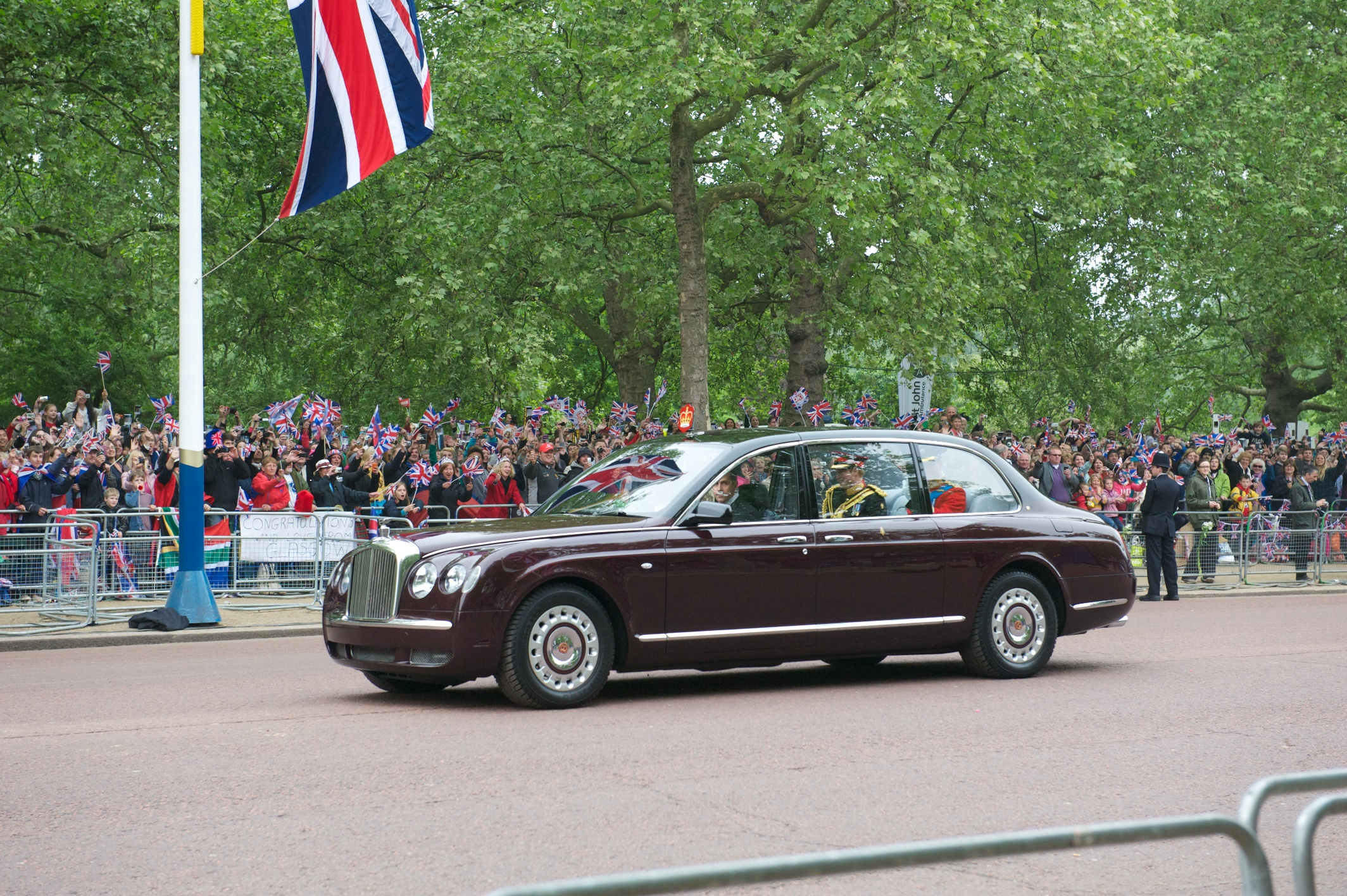
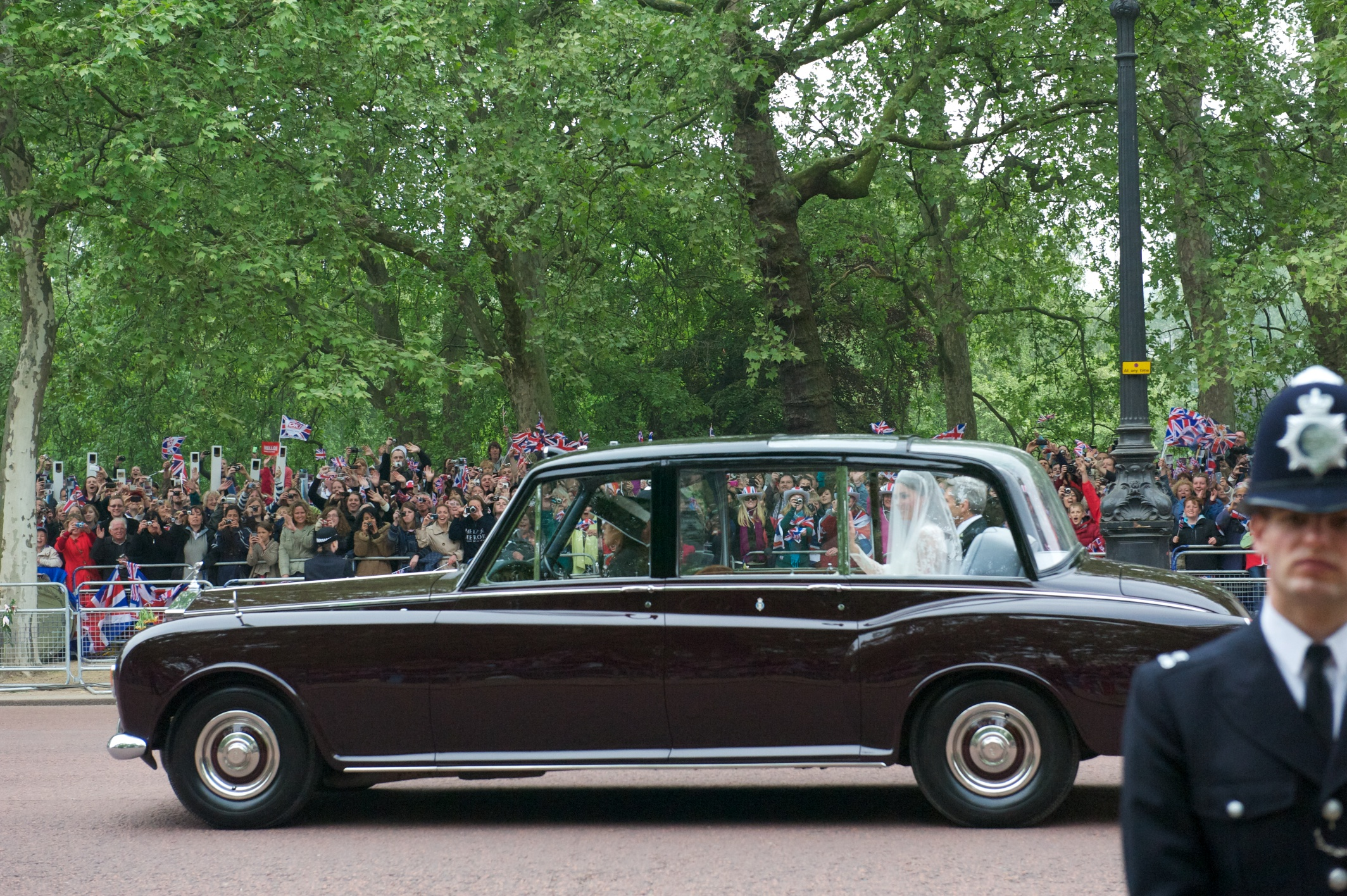
William travelled to the ceremony in a Bentley State Limousine (left) with his brother and best man Harry, and Catherine in a Rolls-Royce Phantom VI Silver Jubilee Car (right) with her father.

The service finished at 12.15 pm, after which the newly married couple travelled to Buckingham Palace in the 1902 State Landau. They were followed by Prince Harry, Pippa Middleton, and the bridesmaids and page boys, who travelled in two of the Ascot Landaus; the Prince of Wales, the Duchess of Cornwall, and Mr and Mrs Middleton, who travelled in the Australian State Coach; and the Queen and the Duke of Edinburgh, who travelled in the Scottish State Coach. At 1.25 pm, the couple appeared on the balcony of Buckingham Palace to watch a flypast of an Avro Lancaster bomber, a Supermarine Spitfire fighter, and a Hawker Hurricane fighter aircraft from the Battle of Britain Memorial Flight, followed by two Typhoons from RAF Coningsby and two Tornado GR4s from RAF Leuchars in a flat diamond formation.

== Ceremony ==
=== Venue ===
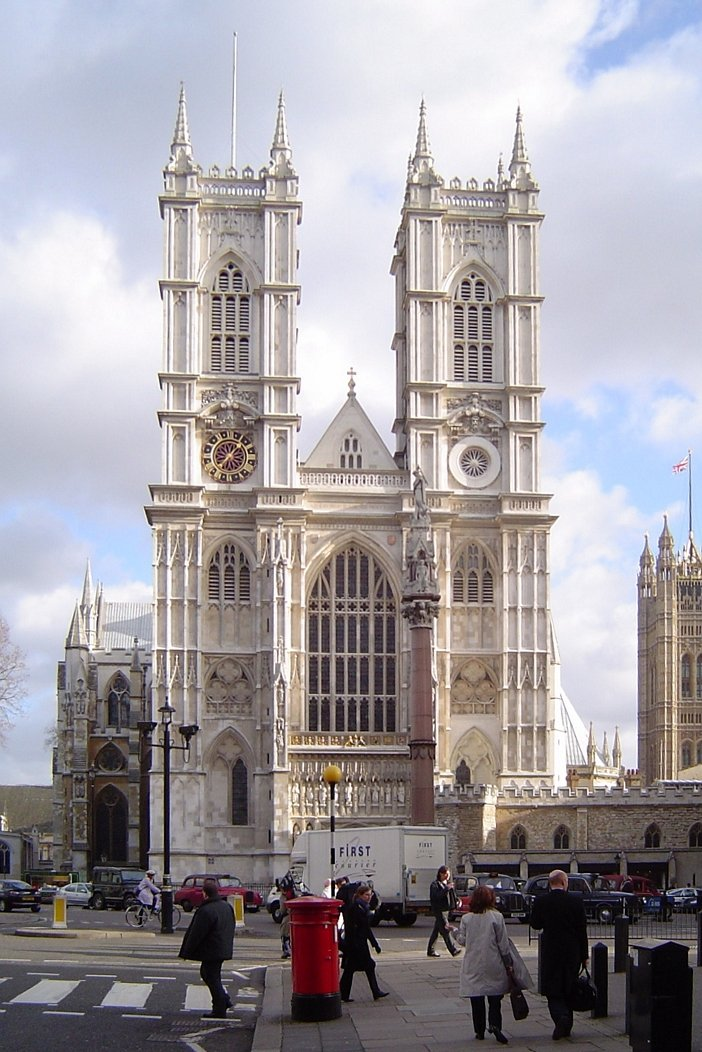
Westminster Abbey has been the venue for coronations and some royal weddings.

Combined coat of arms of William and Catherine, the Duke and Duchess of Cambridge

Westminster Abbey, founded in AD 960, has a particular status and is known as a royal peculiar. Although the abbey has been the traditional location for coronations since 1066, not until the 20th century did it become the church of choice for royal weddings; prior to 1918, most royal weddings took place in the royal chapels, such as the Chapel Royal at St James's Palace and St George's Chapel, Windsor Castle. The abbey, which has a usual seating capacity of 2000, has been the venue for most royal weddings in the last century, including those of William's grandparents (Queen Elizabeth II and Prince Philip in 1947, and John Spencer, Viscount Althorp and the Hon. Frances Ruth Roche in 1954), William's great-aunt Princess Margaret in 1960, William's first cousin twice removed Princess Alexandra in 1963, William's aunt Princess Anne in 1973, and William's uncle Prince Andrew in 1986. It was also the setting for the funeral of Diana, Princess of Wales, in 1997. A prominent decorative addition inside the abbey for the ceremony was an avenue of 20-foot tall trees, six field maples and two hornbeams, arranged on either side of the main aisle.

=== Bridal party ===
Contrary to royal tradition, the groom had a best man—his brother, Prince Harry—instead of two supporters. Catherine chose her sister, Pippa, as the maid of honour. There were four bridesmaids and two page boys:

- Lady Louise Mountbatten-Windsor, the seven-year-old daughter of the Prince Edward, Earl of Wessex, and Sophie, Countess of Wessex;
- Margarita Armstrong-Jones, the eight-year-old daughter of David Armstrong-Jones, Viscount Linley, and Serena, Viscountess Linley;
- Grace van Cutsem, the three-year-old daughter of the couple's friend Hugh van Cutsem;
- Eliza Lopes, the three-year-old granddaughter of Camilla, Duchess of Cornwall;
- William Lowther-Pinkerton, the ten-year-old son of William's private secretary, Major Jamie Lowther-Pinkerton; and
- Tom Pettifer, the eight-year-old son of Princes William and Harry's former nanny, Tiggy Pettifer.

=== Wedding attire ===
==== Bride ====
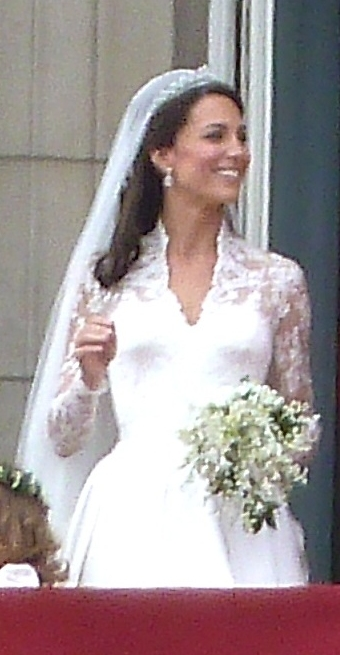
Catherine in her wedding dress

Catherine's bridal dress, designed by the London-based designer Sarah Burton at Alexander McQueen, was made of ivory satin and featured an overlaid long-sleeved V-neck lace bodice and appliquéd full skirt with box pleats, the back leading to a nine-foot train. The bodice incorporated machine-made lace, sourced from manufacturers in France and Britain. Floral motifs were cut from lengths of these and then appliquéd by hand onto silk net (tulle) by workers from the Royal School of Needlework. The motifs included roses, thistles, daffodils and shamrocks to represent England, Scotland, Wales and Northern Ireland. Middleton's point-toed pump shoes were also from Alexander McQueen and had a lace pattern matching the dress with appliqués made by the Royal School of Needlework.

The veil was held in place by the Cartier Halo Tiara, made in 1936 and lent to her by the Queen. It was purchased by the Queen's father, who was to become King George VI, for his wife, Elizabeth, three weeks before his accession. Princess Elizabeth (later Queen Elizabeth II) received the tiara from her mother on her 18th birthday. In order to avoid her tiara falling off (as had happened for Lady Diana Spencer while wearing a Spencer family tiara during her 1981 wedding to Charles, Prince of Wales), Catherine's stylists "backcombed the top [of her hair] to create a foundation for the tiara to sit around, then did a tiny plait in the middle and sewed it on."

For the customary bridal themes of "something old, something new, something borrowed, something blue", Middleton's gown and veil had lace appointments (the "old"); she was given custom-made diamond earrings by her parents, inspired by the Middleton family's new coat of arms (the "new"; made by Robinson Pelham) and the Queen's tiara (the "borrowed"); and a blue ribbon was sewn into the bodice (the "blue").

Catherine's shield-shaped wired bouquet, designed by Shane Connolly, contained myrtle, lily of the valley, sweet William, ivy and hyacinth.

Catherine's hair was styled in loose curls for the occasion by hair dresser James Pryce of the Richard Ward Salon. She received private make-up lessons from Arabella Preston and the entire bridal party received "makeup artistry assistance" from Bobbi Brown make-up artist Hannah Martin prior to the event. It was reported at the time that ultimately Catherine did her own makeup for the occasion but Brown later stated that Martin had done her makeup. The look was described as a "soft smokey eye" with pink lips and cheeks. Her nails were painted by manicurist Marina Sandoval in a mixture of two polishes: a "barely there pink" and a "sheer beige" to complement her skin tone and gown.

==== Bridal attendants ====
Pippa Middleton, Catherine's maid of honour, also wore a gown by Sarah Burton of Alexander McQueen. It was described as being made of "heavy, ivory satin-based crepe, with a cowl front and with the same button detail and lace trims as Catherine's dress". Like her sister, she received "makeup artistry assistance" from Bobbi Brown make-up artist Hannah Martin. Her hair was loosely curled in a half-up, half-down style by the Richard Ward Salon with a deep side part and a hairpiece made of ivy and lily of the valley to match Catherine's bouquet.

The young bridesmaids wore dresses designed by Nicki Macfarlane, handmade with the help of Macfarlane's daughter Charlotte, in their homes at Wiltshire and Kent. The gowns echoed Catherine's dress and were made with the same fabrics and button detail along the back. They were described as having a "ballerina-length, full, box pleated skirt" and were hand finished with English Cluny lace. Their ivy and lily-of-the-valley hair wreaths were influenced by Catherine's mother Carole's headdress at her 1980 wedding to Michael Middleton.

All of the bridesmaids wore satin Mary Jane style shoes with a Swarovski crystal buckle designed by Devon-based Rainbow Club. Their flowers were designed and made by Shane Connolly and replicated the flowers in Catherine's bouquet: lily-of-the-valley, sweet William, and hyacinth.

The pageboys' outfits were designed by Kashket and Partners in the style worn by a "Foot Guard officer at the time of the Regency (the 1820s)" with an insignia from the Irish Guards, whose Colonel was Prince William. The tunics are red with gold piping and have Irish shamrocks on the collars. The pages wore a gold and crimson sash (with tassel) around their waists, as is tradition for officers in the Irish Guards when in the presence of a member of the Royal Family.

==== Groom and best man ====
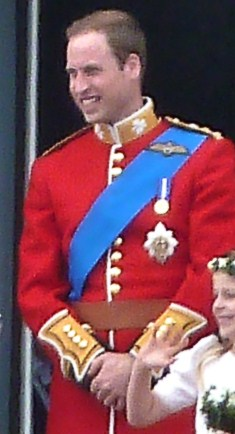
Prince William in uniform

Prince William had intended to wear the frock coat uniform of an Irish Guards officer as he had been appointed Colonel of that regiment earlier that year; however, the Queen insisted that William wear the regiment's full dress uniform with scarlet tunic. William wore the mounted officer's uniform in Guard of Honour Order with a forage cap rather than the bearskin hat. As a Knight Companion of the Order of the Garter, he wore the order's star and blue riband, to which were affixed his RAF wings and Golden Jubilee Medal.

Prince Harry wore the uniform of a captain of the Blues and Royals (Royal Horse Guards and 1st Dragoons), with a forage cap. He wore aiguillettes, a cross-belt and gold waist belt with sword slings, but no sword. He wore the wings of the Army Air Corps and Golden Jubilee and Afghanistan Campaign medals.

Designer Russell Kashket worked with the Princes to address concerns they had with the outfits. One such concern was the heat of the Abbey, so the designers used special material to absorb the heat while still achieving the desired look. While military dress uniforms do not traditionally have pockets, the palace requested that some sort of compartment be added to Harry's outfit for Catherine's wedding ring.

=== Wedding service ===
External videos
- The Wedding of Prince William and Catherine Middleton (external video)

The order of service chosen by the bridal couple was the Series One form, which is virtually identical to that of the 1928 Prayer Book. The Dean of Westminster, John Hall, officiated for most of the service, with Rowan Williams, the Archbishop of Canterbury, as celebrant of the marriage and Richard Chartres, the Bishop of London, preaching the sermon. It has long been traditional for the Archbishop of Canterbury, the Church of England's most senior bishop, to officiate at the weddings of England's monarchs and future monarchs. Chartres is a close friend of the then-Prince of Wales and confirmed both Prince William and Catherine Middleton.

The service commenced with the procession of the Queen, Prince Philip and the clergy. Shortly after, Middleton arrived with the party of maid of honour and junior attendants. As the choir sang "I was glad", an anthem by Sir Hubert Parry composed in 1902 for the coronation of King Edward VII, Catherine made her three-and-a-half-minute procession through the nave and choir on her father's arm, to meet Prince William. The service proceeded with the formal service and congregational singing of three well-known hymns, fanfares, anthems, organ and orchestral music.

In the marriage vows, the couple promised to "love, comfort, honour and keep" each other. This was sealed by the exchange of a single ring.

The lesson, read by Catherine's brother James Middleton, was from the Epistle to the Romans (Chapter 12, verses 1–2 and 9–18) and is an exhortation to live a righteous and peaceful life.

The sermon, preached by Richard Chartres, Bishop of London, commenced with a quotation from Catherine of Siena, whose feast day it was. He urged the couple to live selflessly, each remembering the needs of each other and seeking to transform each other by love rather than seeking to reform. He ended the sermon with a prayer composed by the couple themselves:

God our Father, we thank you for our families; for the love that we share and for the joy of our marriage.

In the busyness of each day, keep our eyes fixed on what is real and important in life and help us to be generous with our time and love and energy. Strengthened by our union help us to serve and comfort those who suffer.

We ask this in the Spirit of Jesus Christ. Amen.

The service continued with prayers and exhortations by the dean and archbishop. A newly composed choral anthem was sung by the choir. After the signing of the registers, William and Catherine walked down the aisle, pausing briefly to bow and curtsey to the Queen. They were followed in procession by other members of the bridal party, and their families, being joined at the door by the two youngest bridesmaids.

On leaving Westminster Abbey, to the pealing of bells, they passed through a guard of honour of individually selected men and women from the various services, and were greeted by cheers from the crowds. The bridal couple entered the 1902 State Landau drawn by four white horses with postilions and attendant footmen, and guarded by a mounted escort of the Life Guard. A similar open carriage carried the rest of the bridal party, escorted by the Blues and Royals. The Queen and other members of the Royal Family followed in coaches drawn by the Queen's Cleveland Bay horses, and in state cars.

The wedding bouquet was returned to Westminster Abbey and placed on the tomb of the Unknown Warrior by a royal official after the photographs had been taken. This followed the tradition started by Prince William's great-grandmother Lady Elizabeth Bowes-Lyon, after her wedding to Prince Albert, Duke of York (later King George VI), in 1923. The formal portraits were taken by Hugo Burnand at Buckingham Palace following the ceremony.

=== Music ===
Two choirs, one orchestra, and a fanfare ensemble played the music for the service. These were the Westminster Abbey Choir, the Chapel Royal Choir, the London Chamber Orchestra, and a fanfare ensemble from the Central Band of the Royal Air Force. The choirs were directed by James O'Donnell, Organist and Master of the Choristers at Westminster Abbey. The abbey's sub-organist, Robert Quinney, played the organ. The organist, choir master and composer at the Chapel Royal was Andrew Gant. The London Chamber Orchestra was conducted by Christopher Warren-Green, who was its music director and principal conductor. The fanfares were performed under the direction of Wing Commander Duncan Stubbs.

Catherine processed down the aisle to the anthem "I was glad", written by Sir Hubert Parry, from Psalm 122. It was composed for the crowning of Prince William's great-great-great-grandfather, Edward VII, at Westminster Abbey in 1902.

Three congregational hymns were sung during the service:

- "Guide Me, O Thou Great Redeemer" sung to the tune "Cwm Rhondda". The hymn, originally written in Welsh by 18th-century Methodist preacher William Williams, had been sung at the funeral of Diana, Princess of Wales.
- "Love Divine, All Loves Excelling". The words were written by Charles Wesley and its tune – Blaenwern – was composed by William Penfro Rowlands, during the 1904–1905 Welsh Revival. This hymn was sung at the Prince of Wales's 2005 marriage to the Duchess of Cornwall.
- "Jerusalem", based on the poem by William Blake and set to music by Parry.

In addition, "God Save the Queen" was heralded with a fanfare and sung between the blessing and the signing of the marriage registers.

Choral compositions featured in the service were Parry's Blest Pair of Sirens (a setting of an ode by John Milton) during the signing of the register, Paul Mealor's Ubi Caritas et Amor as the motet and a specially commissioned anthem, "This is the day which the Lord hath made" consisting of words chosen from the psalms, by John Rutter.

Fanfare ensemble leader Wing Commander Duncan Stubbs's own composition Valiant and Brave was performed as the royal couple signed the wedding registers. Preux et audacieux (which translates from French as "Valiant and Brave") is the motto of 22 Squadron, in which Prince William was serving as a search and rescue pilot at RAF Valley in North Wales. The fanfare led into the recessional music, the orchestral march "Crown Imperial" by William Walton, composed for the coronation of George VI and which was also performed at Charles and Diana's wedding.

The music performed before the service included two instrumental pieces by Sir Peter Maxwell Davies ("Veni Creator Spiritus" and "Farewell to Stromness"), as well as works by Johann Sebastian Bach, Benjamin Britten, Frederick Delius, Edward Elgar, Gerald Finzi, Charles Villiers Stanford, Ralph Vaughan Williams and Percy Whitlock.

The bells of Westminster Abbey rang a full peal as the newly married couple and guests left the church. The ten bells rang a peal called "Spliced Surprise Royal", consisting of 5,040 changes, that took more than three hours to complete. They were rung by the volunteers of the Westminster Abbey Company of Ringers, under the direction of David Hilling.

=== Wedding ring ===
Catherine's Welsh gold wedding ring was made by the royal warrant holder Wartski, a company with roots in Bangor, Gwynedd, north Wales. Since 1923, it has been a tradition in the Royal Family to use Welsh gold for the wedding ring of the bride. This ring was made from a small amount of gold that had been kept in the royal vaults since it was presented to Queen Elizabeth II. It was mined from the Clogau Gold Mine in the mountains of North Wales. The Clogau Gold Mine had its heyday in the late nineteenth century, was abandoned in the early twentieth century, was reopened in 1992 and finally closed in 1998. The Queen had given a piece of the gold that had been in the family for many years to Prince William. Prince William chose not to receive a wedding ring at the ceremony.

=== Title upon marriage ===
On the morning of the wedding, it was announced that William was to be created Duke of Cambridge, Earl of Strathearn, and Baron Carrickfergus, with Catherine becoming Her Royal Highness The Duchess of Cambridge after the marriage service. This was in line with the practice of granting titles upon marriage to royal princes who did not already have one (for example, Prince Andrew was created Duke of York when he married in 1986). Strathearn is close to St Andrews, Fife, in Scotland, where the couple met as students, and Carrickfergus is in Northern Ireland. (Note: The titles became official on 26 May 2011, when the Letters Patent granting these were signed, passed the Great Seal, and recorded on the Roll of the Peerage.)

== Family celebrations ==
=== Reception ===
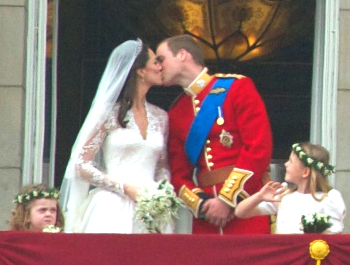

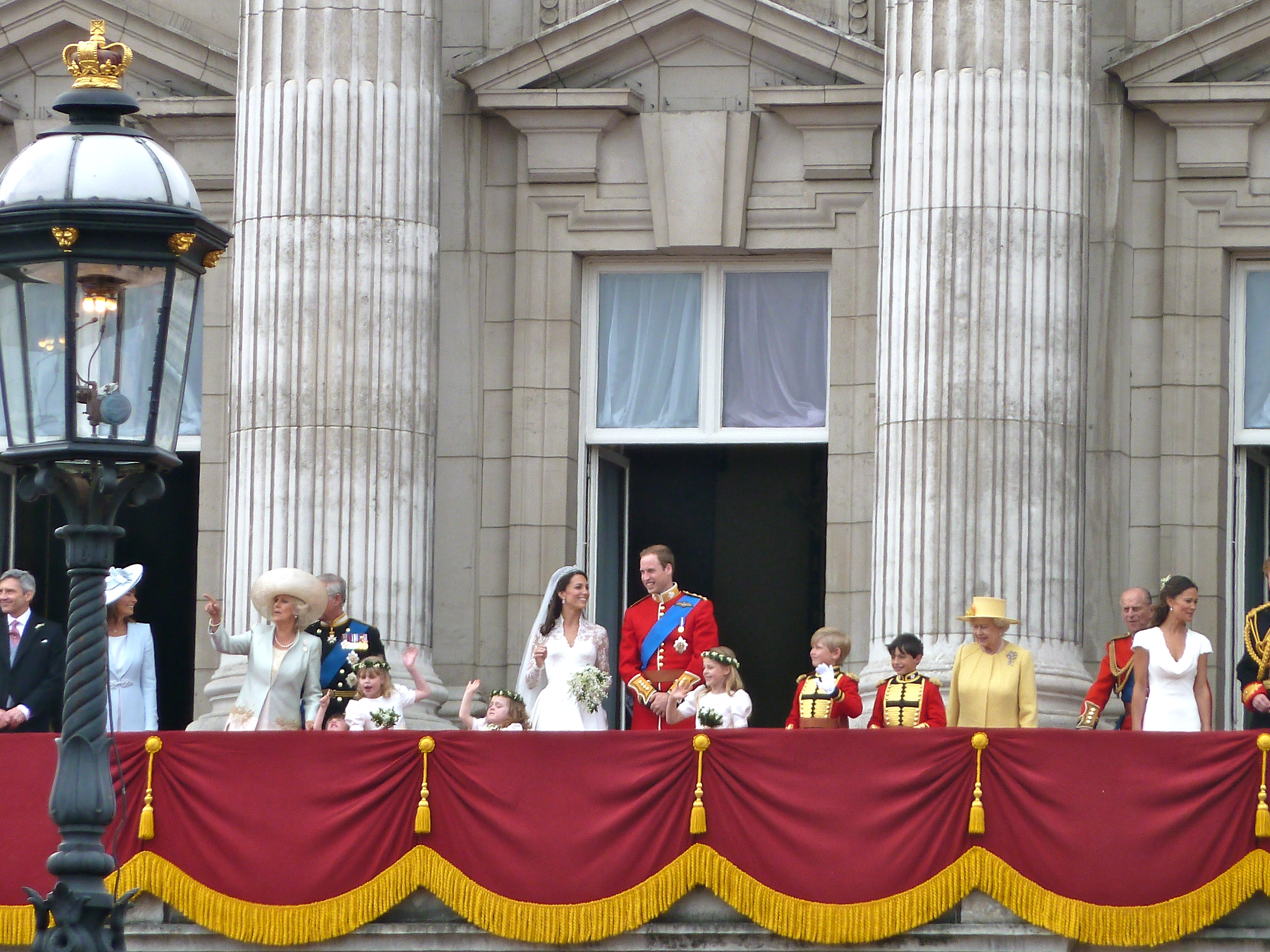
The newlyweds and the bridal party appeared on the balcony of Buckingham Palace; from left to right: Michael Middleton, Carole Middleton, the Duchess of Cornwall, the Prince of Wales, Eliza Lopes, Lady Louise Mountbatten-Windsor, Grace van Cutsem, the Duchess of Cambridge, the Duke of Cambridge, Margarita Armstrong-Jones, Tom Pettifer, William Lowther-Pinkerton, the Queen, the Duke of Edinburgh, Pippa Middleton, Prince Harry

The night before the wedding, the Queen and other members of the royal family and royals from other countries attended a gala dinner at Mandarin Oriental Hyde Park organised by the Queen's cousin Lady Elizabeth Shakerley. After the wedding, the Queen hosted a lunchtime reception at Buckingham Palace, starting after the arrival of the married couple's carriage. It was a private gathering for guests drawn from the congregation who represent the couple's official and private lives. The couple made an appearance on the balcony on the east (main) front of Buckingham Palace, where they shared a kiss twice. Claire Jones, Official Harpist to the Prince of Wales, performed at the reception, playing a gold leaf harp known as "Prince of Wales" presented to Prince Charles in 2006 by Italian-American harp maker Salvi Harps.

At the reception, guests were served a selection of canapés. The main cake was an eight-tier fruit cake decorated with Lambeth-piped sugar paste flowers. Cake designer Fiona Cairns based in Fleckney, Leicestershire was chosen in February 2011 to bake the wedding cake. Additionally, McVitie's made a chocolate biscuit groom's cake from a Royal Family recipe, specially requested by Prince William, for the reception at Buckingham Palace. This icebox cake is a favorite tea cake of the Prince, his mother, Diana, Princess of Wales, and his grandmother Queen Elizabeth II.

At 3.35 pm, William drove his new wife back up the Mall for the short distance to Clarence House, his official London residence. The car, a blue, two-seater Aston Martin DB6 Volante (MkII convertible) that had been given to Prince Charles by the Queen as a 21st birthday present, was decorated in the customary newlywed style by the best man and friends; the rear number plate read "JUST WED". This was actually just for show; the registered number plate was EBY 776J. The Prince had changed into a Blues and Royals captain's frock coat also made by Kashket; his wife was still wearing her wedding dress. In a surprise organised by RAF Wattisham, the car was shadowed by a yellow Sea King helicopter flying the RAF Ensign from its winch cable, marking William's service as a pilot with the RAF Search and Rescue Force.

=== Evening celebrations ===
In the evening, the Prince of Wales hosted a private dinner, followed by dancing, at Buckingham Palace for the couple and their close friends and family. Prince Harry said a few words at the reception before handing over to James Meade and Thomas van Straubenzee who delivered the reception speeches. For the evening reception, the Duchess of Cambridge wore a strapless dress by Sarah Burton which "featured a circle skirt and diamante detailing". She also wore a white shrug and let her hair down. Singer-songwriter Ellie Goulding performed at the event, singing her rendition of "Your Song" for the couple's first dance. She also performed her hit single "Starry Eyed" for the assembled guests. The event ended with a small fireworks display in the palace grounds.

The menu for the evening reception remained unknown for several years until a copy of the menu was sold at an auction:

- South Uist salmon, Lyme Bay crab, Hebridean langoustines and a fresh herb salad with 2009 Domaine Guyot-Javillier Meursault
- North Highland organic lamb from Prince Charles's organic farm with spring vegetables, English asparagus, Jersey Royal potatoes and sauce Windsor with 2004 L'Hospitalet de Gazin Pomerol
- Berkshire honey ice cream, sherry trifle and chocolate parfait with Laurent-Perrier Rosé champagne
- Coffee and mint tea

== Public celebration ==
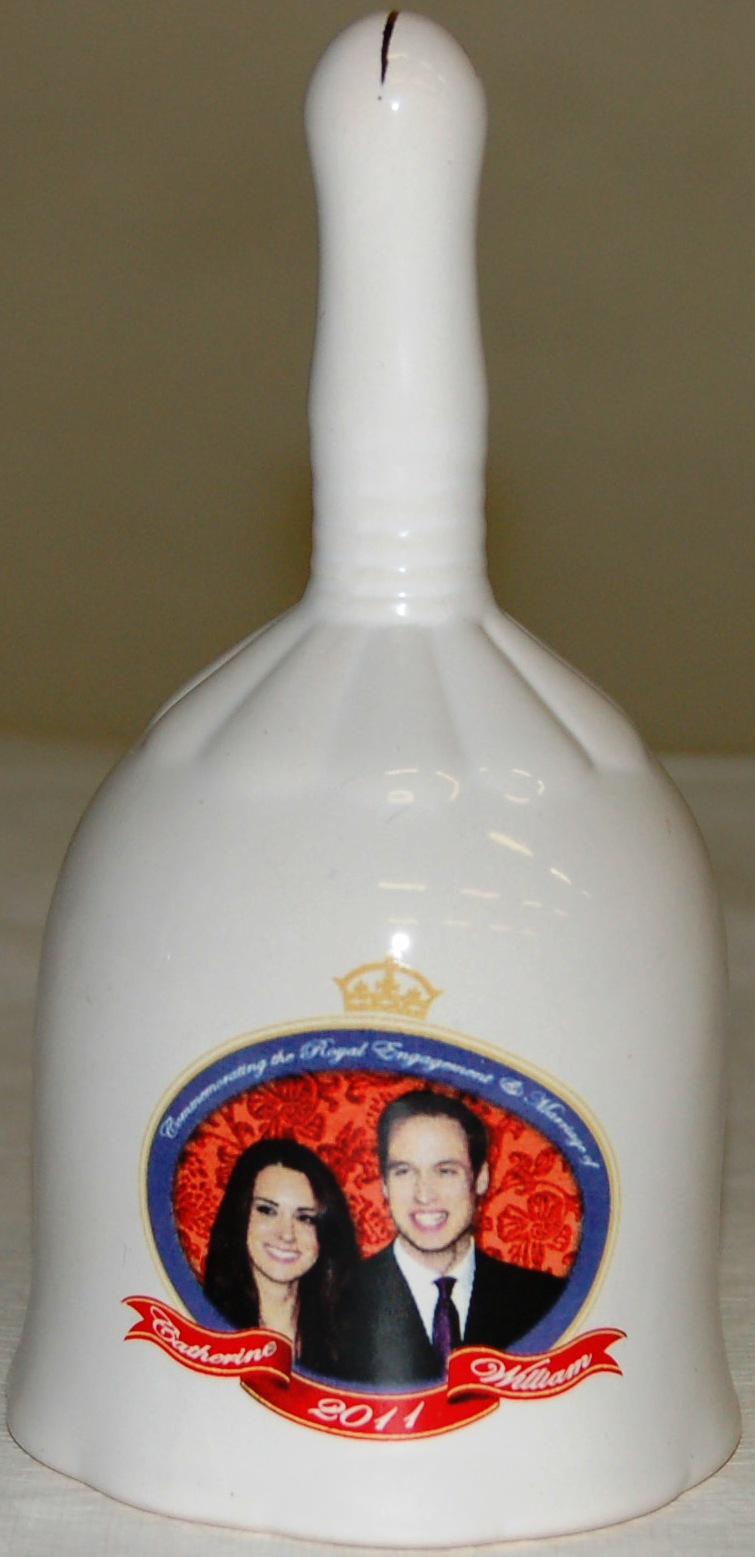
A bell with William and Catherine's profile, made to commemorate the royal wedding.

=== Official merchandise, coins, and stamps ===
Prince William and Catherine Middleton personally approved an official range of china (including handmade plates, cups, and pill boxes) to be made for the Royal Collection and sold as souvenirs from December 2010 onwards. The items were decorated with the intertwined initials of the couple under the prince's coronet and included the wording "To celebrate the marriage of Prince William of Wales and Catherine Middleton 29 April 2011." The Lord Chamberlain's office approved a longer list of memorabilia, including official mugs, plates, biscuit tins, and porcelain pill pots. The document also clarified the use of William's coat of arms and pictures of the couple on such items.

To mark the engagement of William and Catherine, the Royal Mint produced an official Alderney £5 engagement coin, showing the couple in profile, and an official £5 coin for the wedding. The Royal Australian Mint issued a series of circulation and collectable coins designed by Stuart Devlin. The Royal Canadian Mint released a series of coins, and Canada Post issued a stamp, approved by Clarence House, in commemoration of the wedding. On 21 April, a set of commemorative postage stamps, featuring the couple's official engagement photographs, was issued by Royal Mail.

=== Broadcasting ===
The wedding was widely broadcast on television, internet, and radio, in more than 180 countries. ITV, BBC, and CNN covered the ceremony and associated events live through the combined pool of footage from the BBC, Sky, and ITN to help cover the overall cost.

In North America, which is five to nine hours behind British Summer Time, the wedding occurred during the time usually taken up by network breakfast television programmes, which expanded their normal length to allow for full coverage. NBC's Today began coverage at 4 am Eastern Time, and along with MSNBC, partnered with ITV. ABC partnered with BBC, CBS has its own live London affiliates, and Fox and Fox News Channel partnered with their sister network Sky News. (Although the American networks sent their top presenters, NBC expanded the Today show due to the 2011 Super Outbreak of tornadoes; NBC Nightly News presenter Brian Williams had arrived in London to present the coverage, but the outbreak forced him to return to the United States. Nevertheless, NBC had the highest ratings of any American network for the royal wedding, like 30 years before.)

The CBC and CTV had live coverage. Cable networks and radio also had live coverage. In Mexico, the wedding aired on Televisa and TV Azteca; all television stations in Mexico carrying the ceremony stayed on the air during the late night hours instead of normally signing off. The ABC also took the BBC feed in Australia, in addition to pay TV channel UKTV. Coverage was also provided on the Seven Network, Nine Network and Network Ten. The ABC had planned to produce alternative commentary with The Chaser, but in response to these plans, the BBC barred the use of its footage for such a purpose, on orders from Clarence House. The royal wedding was also streamed live online on YouTube via the British Monarchy's official The Royal Channel.

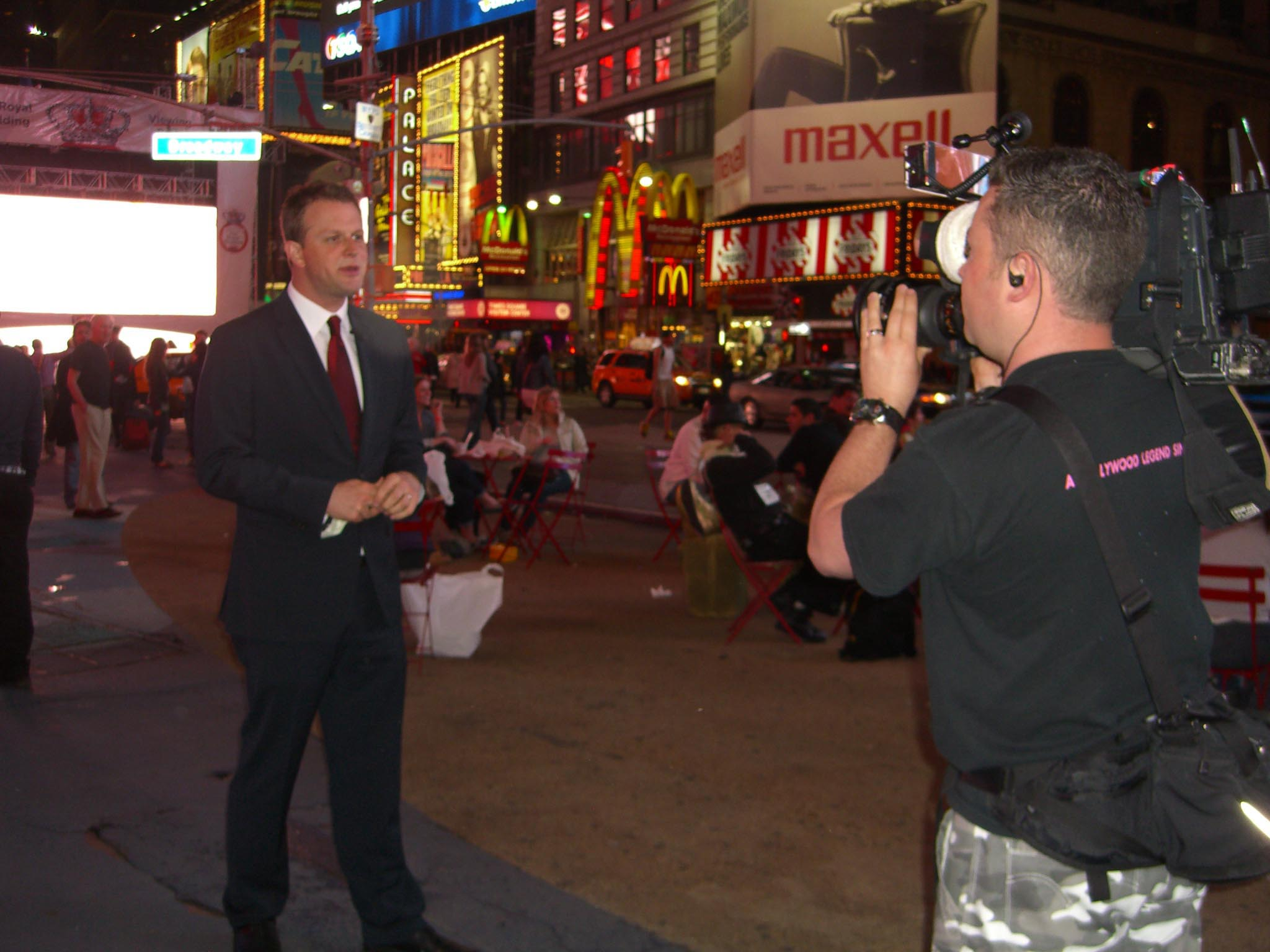
Nick Dixon reporting on American views of the wedding in Times Square for ITV's Daybreak programme on 28 April 2011

An April 2011 poll of 2,000 British adults found that 35% of the public intended to watch the wedding on television while an equal proportion planned to ignore the event altogether. According to their reported plans, women were more than twice as likely (47%) to watch the event as men (23%). Early estimates following the ceremony indicated an estimated 24.5 million people in the United Kingdom watched the wedding on either BBC One or ITV, giving those channels a 99.4% share of the terrestrial television audience as the service began, with the BBC's Live royal wedding website having 9 million hits, estimating over half the British population watched the wedding.

The viewing figures for the event have been the subject of much speculation, with Jeremy Hunt, Culture Secretary, estimating that 2 billion people would watch the wedding. Following the event, this figure was duly reported by the media, but was criticised by some news outlets for being inaccurate and unfounded. Estimated figures include a peak audience of 26.3 million viewers and a total of 36.7 million watching at least some part of the wedding coverage in the UK, while in the United States, the wedding drew an average audience of 22.8 million, with over 60 million tuning in at some point to watch some of the coverage. In India, a reported 42.1 million viewers tuned in, 9.9 million viewers in Germany, 9.6 million viewers in France, 5.22 million viewers watched the event in Canada with twelve million tuning in at some point, five million in Australia, and one million was expected in China, for an audience of 122 million to 176 million viewers, drawing from a total population pool of 3.126 billion (approximately 45% of the world's population). Other reported figures put the global audience at 162 million viewers. In addition to the television audiences, the ceremony attracted 72 million live streams and a reach of 101 million streams on YouTube across 188 countries. With its 72 million streams, the wedding has been listed in the 2012 Guinness Book of World Records for the record of "Most Live Streams for a Single Event", beating the Michael Jackson memorial service in 2009. It has been suggested that the "two billion" figure is exaggerated, and that there are too many gaps in the worldwide TV measuring system to accurately audit global audience figures.

=== Public response ===
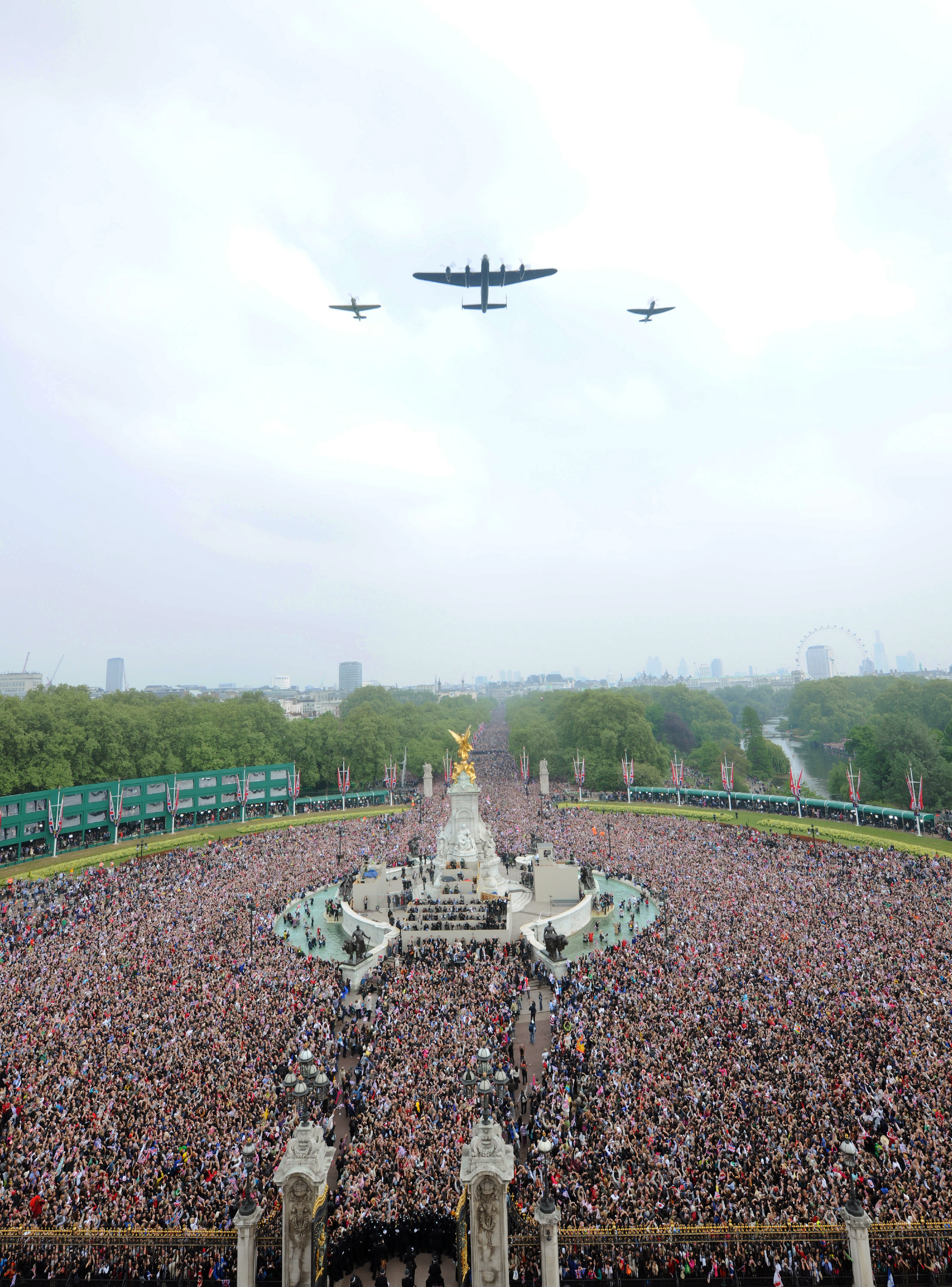
The Battle of Britain Memorial Flight overhead crowds of well-wishers at The Mall hoping to see the newly married couple on the Buckingham Palace balcony

There were about 5,500 applications to hold royal wedding street parties across England and Wales, including 850 in London, one of which was hosted by Prime Minister David Cameron in Downing Street for charity workers and local children. The anti-monarchy campaign group Republic held an alternative street party in Holborn. The event had initially been blocked by Camden Council after businesses raised concerns about loss of trade.

A number of ceremonies and parties were held at places which had an intimate connection with the couple. In Scotland about 2,000 people attended a party at the University of St Andrews, where the royal couple first met. Hundreds of people watched the ceremony on a big screen in Edinburgh's Festival Square. Welsh celebrations were led by Anglesey, where Prince William was a search and rescue pilot and where the couple resided after the wedding. 2,600 people gathered to watch the event on big screens there, and around 200 street parties were organised throughout the rest of the country, including over 50 in Cardiff. Chester Zoo gifted William and Catherine a baby Humboldt penguin named Acorn, with the couple agreeing to sponsor him as he lived in a colony of other Humboldt penguins at the zoo's exhibit in the UK.

The international Peace Bridge across the Niagara River between the United States and Canada at Buffalo, New York, and Fort Erie, Ontario, and operated in part by an Ontario Crown corporation, was lit in red, blue and gold, the colours of the royal coat of arms.

In New Delhi, India, several hotels broadcast the ceremony live. One hotel offered cream tea and cakes decorated with royal emblems.

Criticism and scepticism stemmed from the belief that, at a time of recession and rising unemployment in the UK, millions of pounds in tax funds were used for the wedding's security. The costs of the wedding itself were paid for by the Royal Family and the Middletons. Emma Boon, campaign director for the taxpayers union TaxPayers' Alliance, expressed distaste for the lavish cost of the wedding and noted, "Of course it should be an event for the whole nation to celebrate, but ordinary taxpayers should not be left with a bill fit for a king." Graham Smith, current Campaign Manager of Republic, also spoke out on the taxpayer's responsibility for the wedding.

=== Charitable fund ===
In March 2011, William and Catherine set up a gift fund held by The Foundation of Prince William and Prince Harry to allow well-wishers who wanted to give them a wedding gift to donate money to charities with which they were involved, incorporating the armed forces, children, the elderly, art, sport and conservation.

The fund supported a total of 26 named organisations:

- Oily Cart: a charity providing interactive theatre for under-fives and young children with learning difficulties
- PeacePlayers International: a charity that uses sport, particularly basketball, to unite and educate young people from diverse backgrounds
- The Ocean Youth Trust: a charity based around teaching people to sail to enhance personal development
- Greenhouse Schools: a charity that uses sport and dance programmes to support London's disadvantaged children
- IntoUniversity: a charity that provides local learning centres in disadvantaged areas to inspire the local youngsters to achieve
- Beatbullying: a charity that works with children affected by bullying to provide them with support and confidence
- The Association for Children's Palliative Care (ACT): a charity that aims to give children who are not expected to reach adulthood the best quality of life they can
- The Scottish Community Foundation: a charity that helps fund good causes all across Scotland
- The Berkshire Community Foundation: a charity that gives grants to local voluntary organisations
- Combat Stress: a charity providing care for veterans' mental health
- The Household Cavalry Benevolent fund: a charity providing support to soldiers' families, former soldiers and serving soldiers of the Household Cavalry Regiment
- The Irish Guards Appeal: a charity to help Irish Guards and their families who have been affected by serious injury or disability
- The Army Widows Association: a charity providing comfort and support to widows and widowers of servicemen and women
- The RAF Benevolent Fund: a charity providing practical and financial support to members of the RAF and their families
- The Zoological Society of London: a charity for the worldwide conservation of wildlife and their habitats
- Earthwatch: a charity to promote the understanding and action necessary for a sustainable environment
- The Canadian Coast Guard Auxiliary: a charity providing assistance to the National Defence and Coast Guard with search and rescue and safe boating programmes
- The Christchurch Earthquake appeal: a charity raising money for the victims of the earthquake that devastated Christchurch in February 2011
- The Royal Flying Doctor Service of Australia: a charity delivering health care and emergency service to those who live, travel and work throughout Australia
- Cruse Bereavement Care: a charity providing advice and support to anyone trying to cope with grief
- Dance United: a charity using contemporary dance training to unlock the potential of young offenders and disadvantaged children
- Venture Trust: a charity using wilderness expeditions to provide young people with personal development activities
- Keyfund: a charity providing young people with the opportunity to develop practical skills, confidence and self-awareness to reach their potential
- A National Voice: a charity run for and by young people who are or have been in care to create positive changes to the care system
- Youth Access: a charity providing advice and counselling to youngsters across the UK
- The Community Foundation in Wales: a charity managing funds to provide volunteer organisations in Wales with necessary grants

=== Tributes outside the Commonwealth ===
In the United States, the Empire State Building in New York City was lit in red, white, and blue, the colours of the Union Flag at sunset on 29 April to mark the wedding.

=== Power demand on the UK National Grid ===
In the UK, the National Grid reported a huge surge in demand for power after the service, equivalent to one million kettles being boiled, when the royal couple returned to Buckingham Palace. In Canada, viewership of the wedding was recorded by electricity use in Ontario, where, at the approximate moment Middleton arrived at Westminster Abbey, the Independent Electricity System Operator recorded a 300 megawatt drop in electricity use, which was attributed to "people going about their normal morning routines [stopping] whatever they were doing, rather than make breakfast or shower, and watch the TV".

== Policing ==
The wedding had been subject to threats of violence and disruption. In February 2011, security agencies, including MI5, identified "dissident Irish republican groups" as possible threats. The group Muslims Against Crusades abandoned a planned protest. The English Defence League vowed to hold a counter-demonstration and promised 50 to 100 EDL members at each railway station in central London to block Muslim extremists in a "ring of steel".

=== Security operations and arrests ===
Sixty people arrested at the TUC rally on the March for the Alternative had bail conditions that prevented them entering central London over the wedding period.

On 28 April 2011, political activist Chris Knight and two others were arrested by the Metropolitan Police Service "on suspicion of conspiracy to cause public nuisance and breach of the peace". The three were planning a mock execution of Prince Andrew with a home-made guillotine in central London to coincide with the wedding. The guillotine was workable, except that it did not have a blade.

On the day of the wedding, the Metropolitan Police Service made "pre-emptive" moves, applying blanket stop and search powers and arresting 52 people, including 13 arrested at Charing Cross station in possession of anti-monarchy placards and "climbing equipment". Five people, three of whom were wearing zombie make-up, were arrested "on suspicion of planning a breach of the peace" when they entered a branch of Starbucks. Police described the overall security operation as an "amazing success". Eight of the arrested appealed to the European Court of Human Rights that their arrests were unlawful, but their claims were rejected.

In Scotland, twenty-one people were arrested at an unofficial "street party" in Kelvingrove Park, Glasgow which saw "completely unacceptable levels" of drunkenness according to Strathclyde Police. A taxi driver died on 10 May from injuries sustained when his cab was struck by a police van attending the Kelvingrove incident.

== Honeymoon ==
There were reports that the couple would leave for their honeymoon the day after their wedding, but it was later reported that on the following day William and Catherine flew to Llwynywermod, Prince Charles's then private Welsh estate. William returned to his work as a search-and-rescue pilot, and the couple did not depart for their honeymoon until 9 May, ten days after their wedding. The honeymoon destination was initially kept secret; the couple honeymooned for ten days on a secluded villa on a private island in the Seychelles, returning by 21 May. The length of the honeymoon was limited by William's RAF duties and the couple's scheduled tour to Canada and the United States later that summer.
