= John Zundel =

German organist, composer, and pedagogue

- Johannes Zundel
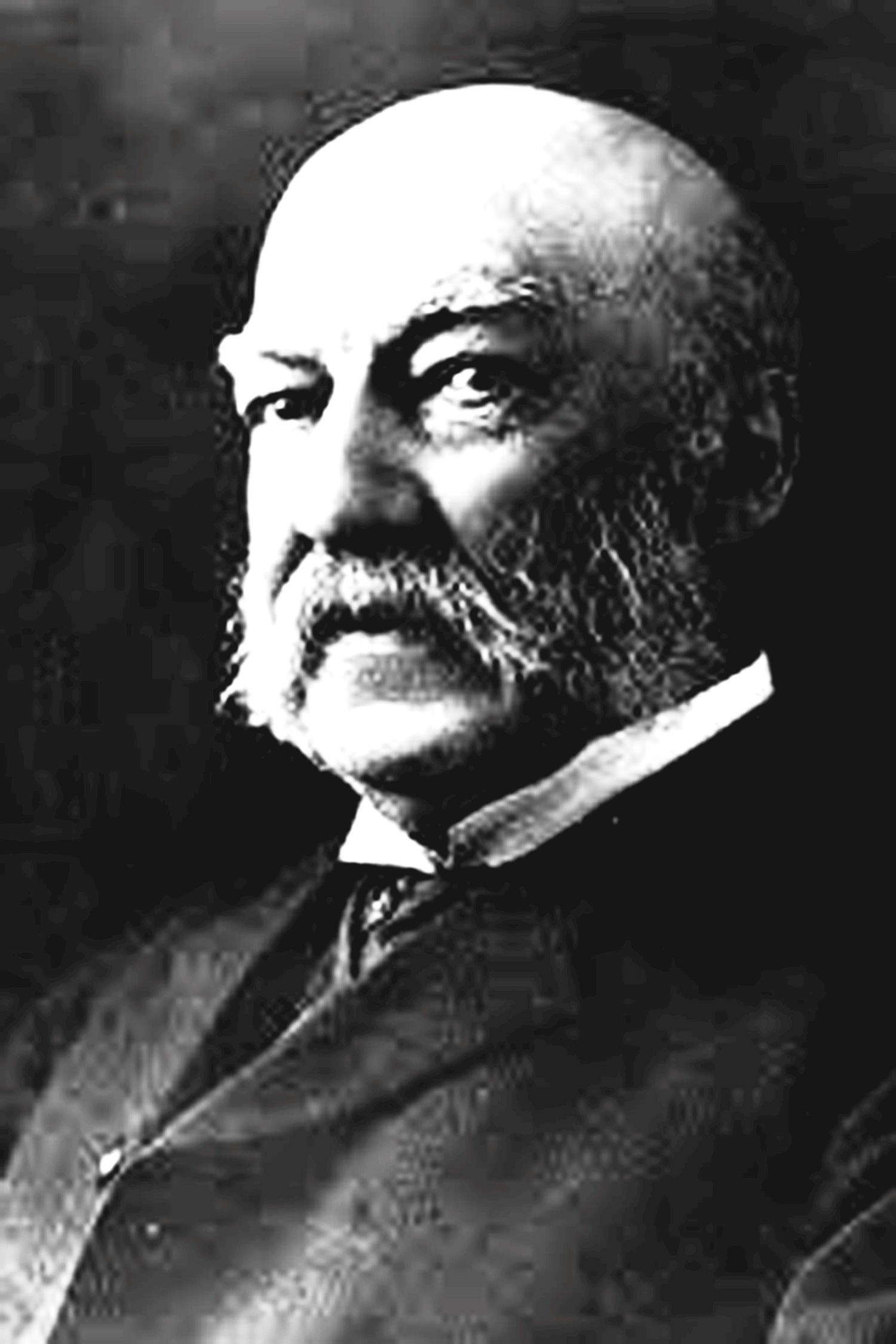
- Portrait
- Born: 10 December 1815; Hochdorf an der Enz, Kingdom of Württemberg, German Confederation
- Died: 21 May 1882 (aged 66); Kirchheim unter Teck, German Empire
- Citizenship: Naturalized citizen of the United States
- Education: Royal Academy at Esslingen
- Occupations: Organist, Composer

John Zundel (10 December 1815 – 21 May 1882) was an organist, composer, arranger, and pedagogue. Zundel was perhaps best known for his hymn BEECHER, widely used in American hymnals with "Love Divine" by Charles Wesley.

== Early life ==
Zundel was born in the village of Hochdorf an der Enz (now part of Eberdingen) in what was then the Kingdom of Württemberg, Germany. He attended the Royal Academy at Esslingen, Württemberg, from 1829 to 1831, then he began teaching at the local school in Birkach, Germany. In 1833 he was appointed teacher of music in Esslingen. During this time, Zundel studied the violin with a pupil of Bernhard Molique. Also he studied the organ first with J.G. French and then with Heinrich Rinck.

== St. Petersburg, Russia ==
In 1839 Zundel studied organ building at the factory of Eberhard Friedrich Walcker, and in 1840 he travelled to St. Petersburg, Russia, to give a concert on a Walcker organ at the Lutheran Church of Saint Peter and Saint Paul. It was the first organ concert ever given on Russian soil. Zundel became organist at Saint Anne Lutheran Church in Saint Petersburg and bandmaster of the Imperial House Guards. He remained in St. Petersburg for seven years.

== Plymouth Church in New York ==
Intending to give organ concerts, Zundel emigrated to the United States in 1847. Unable to find suitable instruments for concerts, he settled in as a church organist. Employed first at the Unitarian Church of Brooklyn under Reverend Farnley in 1848, he was then hired by Henry Ward Beecher in 1850 as music director and organist for Brooklyn's Plymouth Church. Zundel remained at Plymouth Church a total of 28 years, interrupted twice to travel and to serve briefly in nearby churches.

== Compositions ==
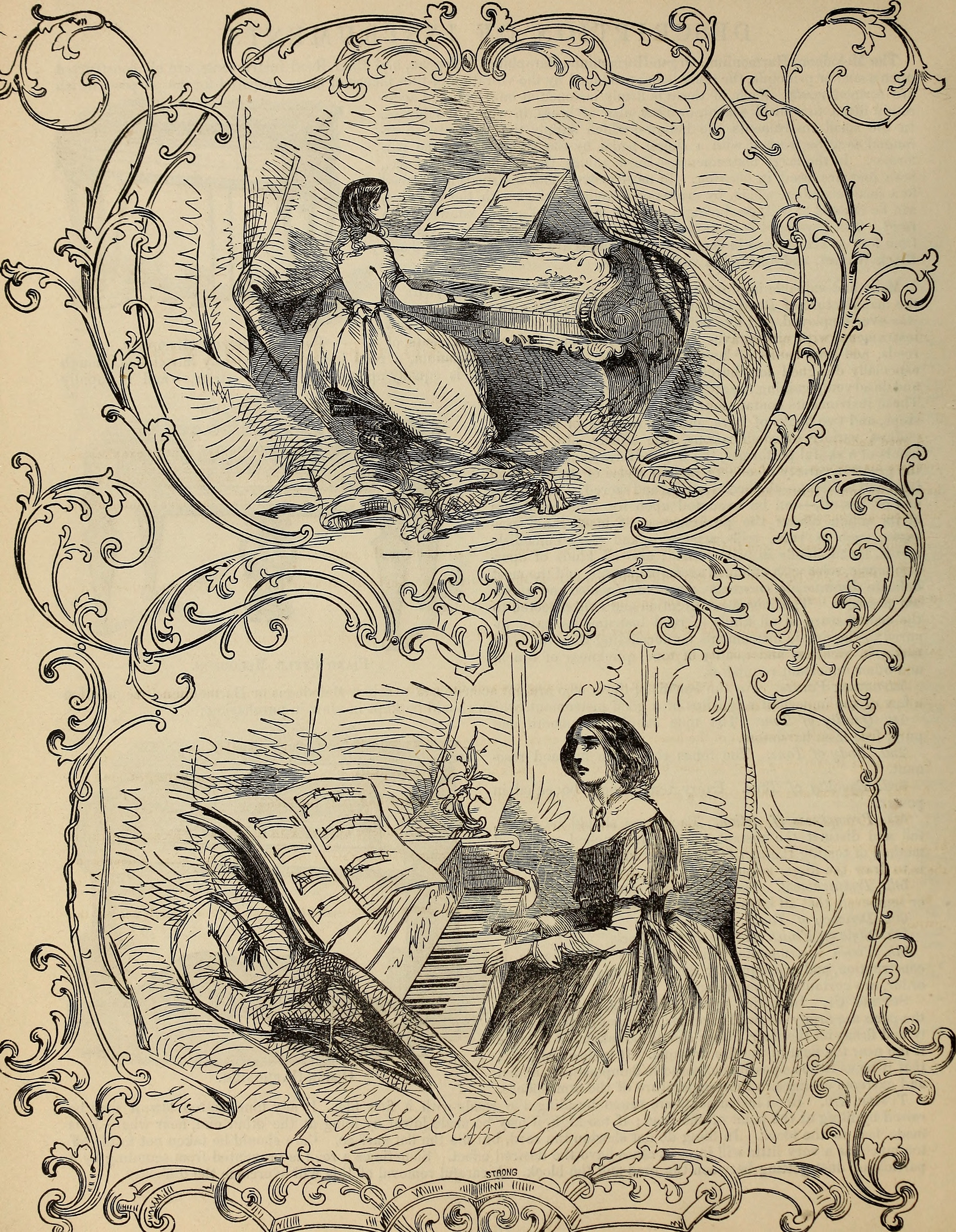
Image from The complete melodeon instructor, in seven parts. - Designed as a thorough instruction book for the melodeon, seraphine, eolican, melopean, organ, or any similar instrument (1853) by John Zundel

Zundel's lasting contributions to music pedagogy were his instructional texts, principally Zundel's Harmony. His work spanned over 20 years.

- The Choral Friend, A Collection of New Church Music, consisting of Original Anthems and Psalms and Hymn Tunes; Adapted to the Most Common Metres. New York: A.S. Barnes & Co. 1852.
- Zundel's Melodeon Instructor, 1853
- The Amateur Organist, 1854
- Plymouth Collection of Hymns, 1855 (edited with Beecher)
- Psalmody, 1855 (editor)
- Modern Organ-School (Boston, Massachusetts: 1860)
- Treatise on Harmony and Modulation, 1862
- Christian Heart Songs, 1870
- School Harmonist (with James E. Ryan) (New York: American Book Company, 1873)

Additionally, Zundel composed a number of preludes, postludes, voluntaries, and fantasies suitable for church services.

Zundel returned to his native country before his death in Kirchheim unter Teck, Germany, in May 1882.
