= Blaenwern =

Christian hymn tune by William Penfro Rowlands

Love Divine, All Loves Excelling sung to the tune of Blaenwern

Blaenwern is a Welsh Christian hymn tune composed by William Penfro Rowlands (1860–1937), during the Welsh revival of 1904–1905. It was first published in Henry H. Jones' Cân a Moliant (1915).

The metre of the tune is 8.7.8.7.D (alternating lines of eight and seven syllables). It may be played in the key of F major or G major, or occasionally A♭ major.

The tune is named after Blaenwern Farm near Tufton, Pembrokeshire, where Rowlands sent his son from Porth to stay with friends of the family to convalesce as it was thought the fresh air would assist his recovery: he named the tune in honour of them.

In the United Kingdom, Blaenwern has come to be used as the prevalent setting for the hymn Love Divine, All Loves Excelling, but also for other texts including the Welsh Deued Dyddiau O Bob Cymysg by William Williams Pantycelyn, and Calon Lân by Daniel James. It also became familiar to a wider audience through the Billy Graham crusades when it was used as a setting to What a Friend We Have in Jesus.

As a setting for Love Divine it is a popular choice at English weddings and was voted as one of Britain's ten favourite hymns in October 2005. Love Divine, All Loves Excelling, set to Blaenwern, was sung at the wedding blessing of Prince Charles and Camilla Parker Bowles and it was also selected as one of three hymns sung at the wedding of Prince William and Catherine Middleton, the others being Guide Me, O Thou Great Redeemer, set to Cwm Rhondda, and Jerusalem.

The tune was also used for Love Divine, All Loves Excelling at the funeral of former British Prime Minister, Margaret Thatcher in 2013, the wedding of Princess Eugenie and Jack Brooksbank in 2018 and the funeral of Queen Elizabeth II in 2022.
