= Eiseman-Renyard and others v the United Kingdom =

2019 court case from the European Court of Human Rights

Submitted 8 August 2017 Decided 5 March 2019
- Full case name: Eiseman-Renyard and others v. the United Kingdom
- Case: 57884/17 57918/17; 58019/17; 58326/17; 58333/17; 58343/17; 58377/17 58462/17
- Language of proceedings: English
- Nationality of parties: British

Ruling
- Inadmissible

Court composition
- President; Aleš Pejchal
- Judges: Tim Eicke; Jovan Ilievski

Instruments cited
- Article 5

Eiseman-Renyard and others v the United Kingdom is a 2019 European Court of Human Rights case between Hannah Eiseman-Renyard and seven other applicants against the United Kingdom for an alleged breach of Article 5 of the European Convention on Human Rights. The case revolved around the Metropolitan Police arresting the claimants prior to the wedding of Prince William and Catherine Middleton based on intelligence that the group intended to disrupt the wedding. The claimants argued that they had been arrested on no valid preventive basis. The Court dismissed the claim as inadmissible due to ill-founded beliefs.

== Background ==
Prince William, then second in line to the British throne, married Catherine Middleton in London on 29 April 2011. The defendants being republicans objected to the wedding and planned ways in which to disrupt it. The defendants were involved in three plans. One was attempting to go to a republican street party at Red Lion Square hosted by the Republic political pressure group but was arrested by a plainclothes Metropolitan Police officer. Eiseman-Renyard and one other were dressed as zombies as part of a "Queer Resistance" plan to hold a "zombie picnic"; the police arrested them based on a leaflet that suggested that "maggot confetti" would be thrown. The remainder were arrested by the British Transport Police at Charing Cross railway station after being found in possession of republican placards and megaphones having intended to join a Republic tea party in Trafalgar Square. The police arrested them on the grounds that they could have caused a breach of the peace due to the large number of monarchists on the streets supporting the royal wedding. The claimants were all later released without charge after the wedding had finished.

The claimants then requested a judicial review of their arrests. The High Court of Justice dismissed the claims on the grounds that the arrests had been proportionate to prevent any immediate breach of the peace. They appealed to the Court of Appeal on a point of law that they believed the arrests were unlawful and contrary to Article 5 of the European Convention on Human Rights. The court denied this on the grounds that the High Court's judgment had not been challenged. Permission was granted to appeal to the Supreme Court of the United Kingdom, who ruled that the police had the right to detain someone to stop them from imminently committing an offence. Leave was then granted to the claimants to appeal to the European Court of Human Rights.

== Case ==
The case was heard on the grounds of an alleged deprivation of liberty under Article 5. The court found that certain types of preemptive detention were considered legal in order to allow police forces to be effective. The claimants had claimed the police had adopted an illegal policy for arrests during the royal wedding; however, the European Court stated that there was no evidence of this and that the police had sufficient grounds for arrest due to suspicion of imminent illegal activities and that a fair balance had been made between the claimants' right to liberty and the safety of the public. Accordingly, all of the claimants' cases were dismissed as inadmissible based on the fact they were "manifestly ill-founded".

The case was reported in the media as precedent for the police to arrest people as a preventative measure even without specific prior knowledge of any planned criminality.

== See also ==
- Preventive detention
