= Goring Hotel =

Luxury hotel in London, England

The Goring Hotel

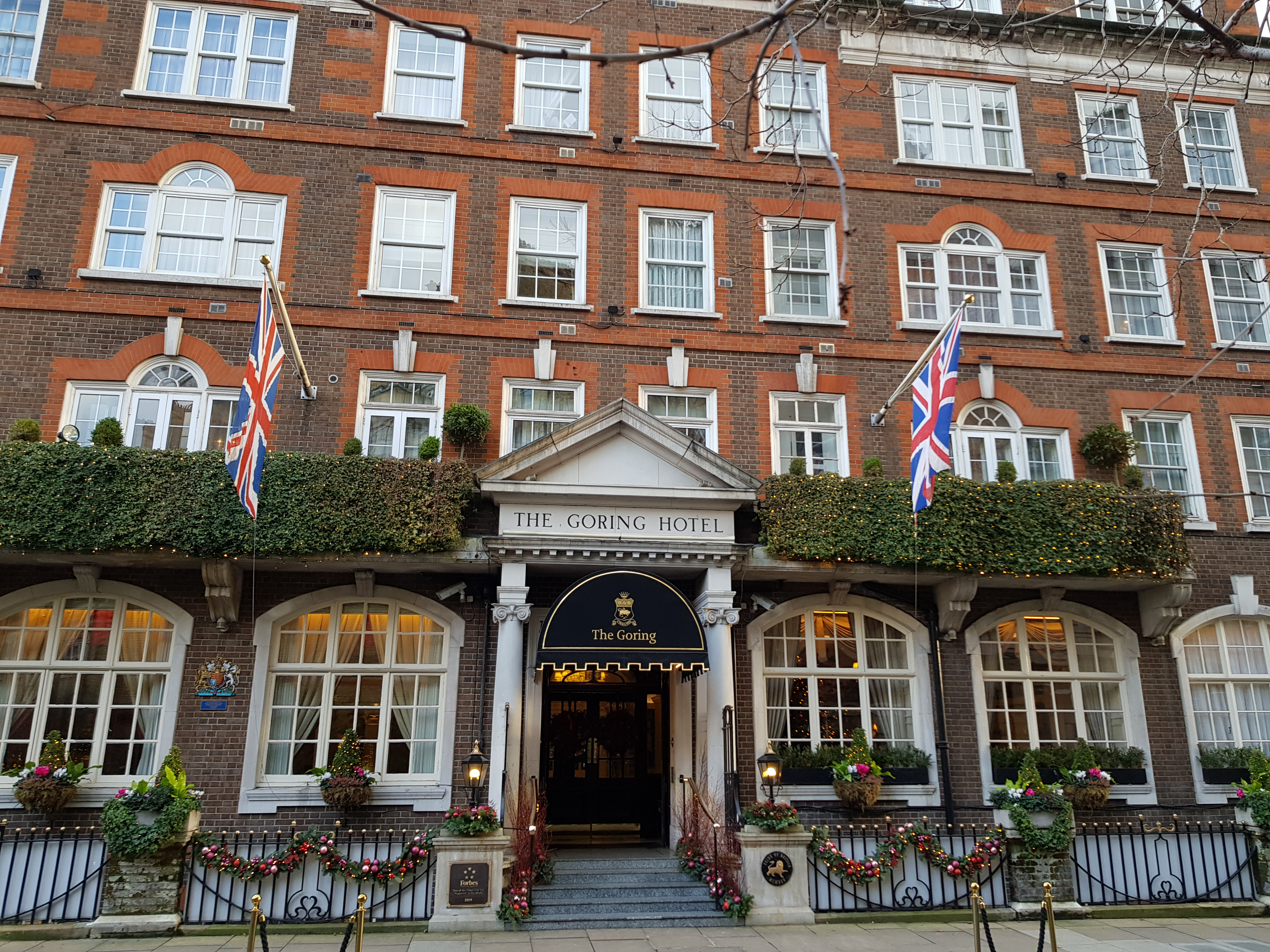

- Location within Central London

General information
- Location: 15 Beeston Place; London, England
- Coordinates: 51°29′50.96″N 0°8′44.16″W
- Opened: 2 March 1910; 116 years ago
- Owner: Goring family
- Operator: Jeremy Goring (CEO)

Design and construction
- Developer: Otto Richard Goring

Other information
- Number of rooms: 69
- Number of restaurants: 1
- Number of bars: 1

Website
- thegoring.com

The Goring Hotel is a 5-star luxury hotel at 15 Beeston Place in the Victoria area of London, England. It is located just east of Belgravia, and to the southwest of Buckingham Palace. The hotel's restaurant – The Dining Room – holds one Michelin Star, and 3 AA Rosettes.

== History ==
The Goring Hotel was opened by Otto Richard Goring on 2 March 1910. It professed to be the first hotel in the world in which every room had a private bathroom and central heating.

In 1914, the hotel became the command centre for the Chief of Allied Forces, and contact with President Woodrow Wilson during World War I was made from this hotel. In November 1917, The Goring became the U.S. Army Headquarters in London, as it was adjacent to the American Naval and Military authorities. The hotel was released back to its owners on 8 September 1919.

In 1919, Lady Randolph Churchill, the mother of Winston Churchill, moved into the hotel. During World War II, the Fox Film crew stayed at the hotel on their way to film footage of the D-Day invasion.

The Goring is the only historic luxury hotel in London which is still owned and run by the same family that originally built it. The Queen Mother was a regular at the hotel. The Goring received a royal warrant of appointment from Queen Elizabeth II in 2013, and it was the sole hotel to be awarded that honour by her.

In 2011, Catherine Middleton and her family were based at the hotel for the days around her wedding to Prince William. She stayed in the Royal Suite the night before she got married. She returned to the hotel in March 2015 (while eight months pregnant) to mark renovations that had taken place, which included a newly decorated front hall.
