= Love Divine, All Loves Excelling =

Christian hymn written by Charles Wesley

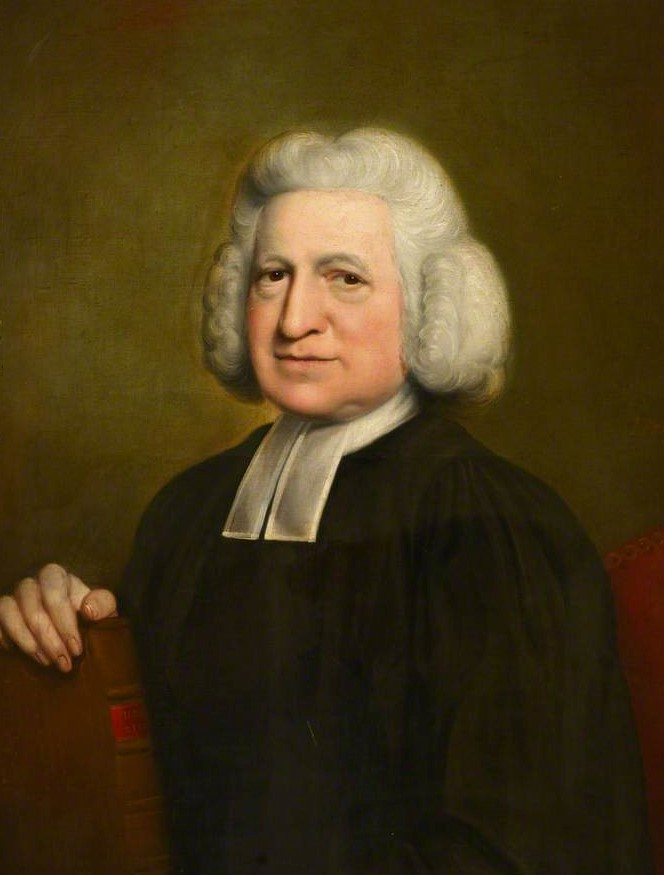
- Charles Wesley
- Genre: Hymn
- Written: 1747
- Text: Charles Wesley
- Based on: 1 John 4:16
- Meter: 8.7.8.7 D
- Melody: “Love Divine” by John Stainer; "Beecher" by John Zundel; "Hyfrydol" by Rowland Prichard; "Blaenwern" by William Penfro Rowlands

Audio sample
- Sung to the melody "Blaenwern": file; help

"Love Divine, All Loves Excelling" is a Christian hymn by Charles Wesley, first published in 1747. It was initially published as part of his Hymns for Those that Seek and Find and quickly became a central hymn in both Methodist and wider Christian worship. The hymn reflects Wesley's teachings on Christian perfection, expressing a longing for God's transforming and sanctifying grace.

The hymn has been set to various tunes, including "Blaenwern" and "Hyfrydol". It is sung in services, including royal weddings, across many denominations.

== Background ==
It first appeared in Wesley's Hymns for those that Seek, and those that Have Redemption (Bristol, 1747), apparently intended as a Christianization of the song "Fairest Isle" sung by Venus in Act 5 of John Dryden and Henry Purcell's semi-opera King Arthur (1691), on which Wesley's first stanza is modelled.

Wesley wrote:

Love Divine, all Loves excelling,
Joy of Heaven to Earth come down,
Fix in us thy humble Dwelling,
All thy faithful Mercies crown;

Dryden had written:

Fairest Isle, all Isles Excelling,
Seat of Pleasures, and of Loves;
Venus here, will chuse her Dwelling,
And forsake her Cyprian Groves.

In Dryden's song, the goddess of love chooses the Isle of Britain over her native Cyprus; in Wesley's hymn divine love itself is asked to choose the human heart as its residence over its native heaven.

The last lines of the hymn are likewise adapted from existing material. Wesley's final lines,

Till we cast our Crowns before Thee,
Lost in Wonder, Love, and Praise!

evidently derive from (and improve on) Addison's opening lines from his "Hymn on Gratitude to the Deity"

When all thy mercies, O my God,
My rising soul surveys;
Transported with the view, I'm lost
In wonder, love, and praise.

It has been suggested that Wesley's words were written specifically for the tune by Purcell to which Dryden's song had been set, and to which the hymn's words themselves were later set (under the tune name "Westminster") by John Wesley in his Sacred Melody, the "annex" to his Select Hymns with tunes annext (1761 et seq.).

Like many hymns, Love Divine is loosely trinitarian in organization: Christ is invoked in the first stanza as the expression of divine love; the Holy Spirit in the second stanza as the agent of sanctification; the Father in the third stanza as the source of life; and the Trinity (presumably) in the final stanza as the joint Creator of the New Creation. Like many hymns, too, this one is a tissue of biblical quotations, including "Alpha and Omega" (st. 2) as an epithet of Christ, from Revelation 21:6; the casting of crowns before God's throne (st. 4), from Revelation 4:10; the promise that Christians shall be "changed from glory into glory" (st. 2 and 4), from 2 Corinthians 3:18; as well as other, more general allusions.

== Textual history ==
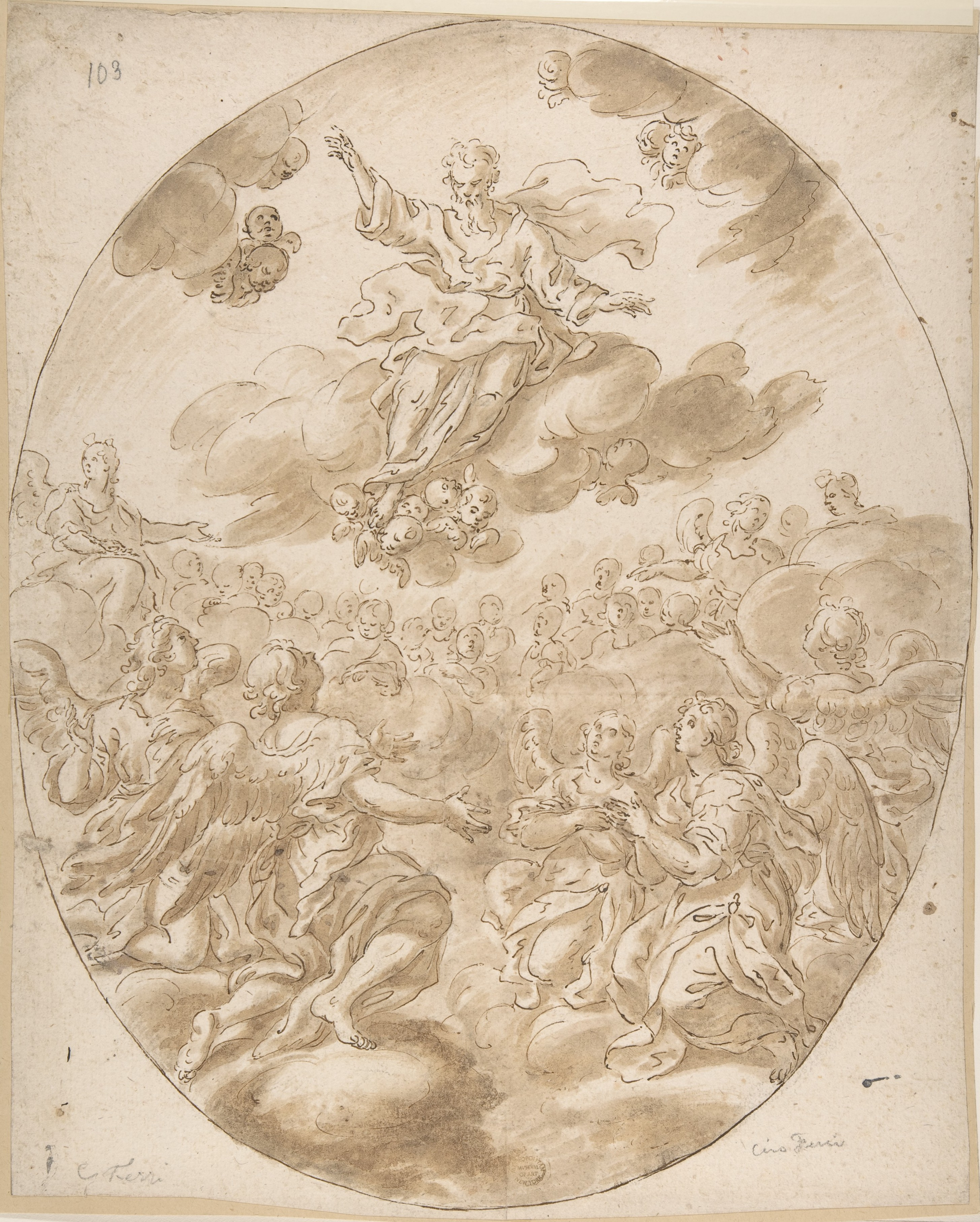
The hymn's lyrics refer to the heavenly host: "Thee we would be always blessing / serve thee with thy hosts above".

At its first appearance, the hymn was in four stanzas of eight lines (8.7.8.7.D), and this four-stanza version remains in common and current use to the present day, being taken up as early as 1760 in Anglican collections such as those by Madan (1760 and 1767), Conyers (1772), and Toplady (1776); in hymn books associated with Whitefield (1767, 1800) and the Countess of Huntingdon's Connexion (1780, and 1800); and in Methodist hymn books slightly outside the mainstream (the Select Hymns of 1783; Spence's Pocket Hymn Books of the early 19th century; and the American Wesleyan Methodist hymn books).

A second, abridged version (with the second stanza omitted), appeared as early as 1778 in Hymns and Psalms for the Service of Fitz-Roy Chapel (London, 1778), then in the Wesleyan "Large Hymn Book" of 1780, and thence in many others, chiefly British and predominantly Anglican, but including also many later official Methodist hymn books. A sample collation of 85 hymn books containing some version of this hymn suggests that the abridged version appears in roughly 25% of Protestant hymn books; the full four-stanza version in most of the remainder.

=== Theologically-motivated alterations ===
The omission of the second stanza is consistent with several other loci of textual variation in the hymn in this respect: the passages which are most subject to change tend for the most part to be those that advance a distinctively Wesleyan "Perfectionist" account of the Christian life—i.e. those that suggest that one can be completely cleansed of sin in this life, by means of a "second blessing" whereby committed and sanctified Christians rest wholly in God and may be said to share the holiness of Christ himself.

Many—certainly including those of a more Calvinist persuasion, and even perhaps Wesley's brother John—found this idea troublesome. Even some fairly innocuous lines ("Let us all thy Life receive," stanza 3) were probably read as suspiciously Perfectionist, hence the common alteration to "Let us all thy Grace receive."

The same is probably true of other oft-changed lines. Most of the more enduring alterations occurred in one or another of the hymn books that together constituted the fledgling ecumenical Evangelical hymnody that emerged in the decades around 1770, partly from the Calvinist wing of the Church of England, partly from Calvinistic Methodists and their circle; preeminently among them the collections of Martin Madan (1760 and many subsequent editions), his imitator Richard Conyers (1772); the more overtly Calvinistic Anglican Augustus Toplady; the hymn books of erstwhile Wesley ally, George Whitefield; and those associated with the Countess of Huntingdon's chapels (and their later incarnation as the Countess of Huntingdon's Connexion). Madan in particular is known for his influential hymn tinkering:

Madan's knack in reconstructing the work of other hands made his book a permanent influence both for good and evil. A number of familiar hymns still bear the marks of his editorial revision.

It was doubtless on theological grounds that the line "Finish then thy New Creation" (stanza 4) was often replaced by "Carry on thy (or 'the') new creation," the latter suggesting an ongoing process of sanctification rather than its achievement; and "Let us see thy great Salvation / Perfectly restor'd in Thee," frequently changed to "...our whole salvation / secured by Thee"), a formulation which also resolves some ambiguous referents. Wesley's original probably meant (in crude paraphrase) "let us experience the great salvation that you provide, so that we will be perfected by participation in you"; unease with the ambiguity, and probably also with the theology, led to revised language that if less striking was felt to be clearer and more orthodox. Both of these changes were introduced by Augustus Toplady's collection of 1776, followed by the Countess of Huntingdon's collections (e.g. that of 1780 and 1800).

"Pure and sinless let us be" (stanza 4) was toned down, or at least made less absolute, by alteration to "Pure and holy," (Toplady 1776 again, followed again by the Countess of Huntingdon 1780 and 1800) and similar substitutes, especially the very common "Pure, unspotted" (Madan, Conyers, and Whitefield) and "Pure and spotless" (John Wesley's Select Hymns for ... all denominations, 5th ed. (1774) through 9th ed. (1783), followed by his "Large Hymn Book" (1780), and the Methodist "Pocket Hymn Books.")

The second stanza, when it was not omitted altogether, offered, and continues to offer, two stumbling-blocks for theologically sensitive Christians: line 4 asks "Let us find that Second Rest"; and line 5, "Take away our Power of sinning." The phrase "Second Rest," to those for whom it was not simply obscure, would seem an explicit reference to Wesleyan "Second Blessing" theology; and the request to be stripped even of the ability to sin doubtless seemed to many unrealistic at best and blasphemous or immoral at worst, as appearing to "be a prayer to take away our free moral agency."

Upon the two doubtful lines in the centre of this stanza, that refined critic, Mr. Fletcher, of Madeley, has remarked:-- 'Mr. Wesley says second rest, because an imperfect believer enjoys a first, inferior rest; if he did no, he would be no believer.' And of the line, 'Take away the power of sinning,' he asks, 'Is this expression not too strong? Would it not be better to soften it by saying, "Take away the love of sinning?" [or the bent of the mind towards sin.] Can God take away from us our power of sinning without taking away our power of free obedience?'

"Second Rest" is very generally replaced, usually by "thy promised rest"; or, later, by "the promis'd rest; and "the Power of Sinning" by "the love of sinning" (probably introduced by Maddan 1767, followed by other representatives of the evangelical hymnody); or "our bent of (or 'to') sinning" (originally and still chiefly in Methodist collections).

In gist, editors (particularly Calvinists) were disposed to perceive Wesleyan doctrine (freewill Arminianism) lurking in the lyrics and to change them accordingly, thus eliciting John Wesley's statement against changes which would make him and his brother accountable for "the nonsense or the doggerel" of others. Several rephrasings of "Love Divine" continue in circulation.

=== Abridged versions ===
Aside from the Wesleys' own abridgement, other abridged versions include one that combines the first half of the second stanza with the first half of the third (omitting the remainder of each); another that omits the third stanza, as well as introducing some aesthetic changes that tend toward the bland; another that combines the first half of stanza 1 with the first half of stanza 2 into a single new stanza 1 and retains a modified version of stanza 4 as a new stanza 2; and yet another that omits the fourth.

Abbreviated Unitarian and Universalist versions of the hymn are typical of those traditions in the radical alterations they make, replacing most references to Christ and all references to Trinitarian orthodoxy, as well as anything else they regarded as offensive to a universal and rational religion; typical too in that they therefore replace "Charles Wesley" as the author in favor of "anonymous." In one American Universalist version from 1841 (and similarly in the Unitarian hymnal of 1872) the four-stanza Trinitarian hymn to Christ and his Spirit is transformed into a two-stanza paean to God narrowly addressed as "Father...almighty"; in another, widely but mistakenly attributed to Yorkshire Baptist John Fawcett under the title "Praise to Thee, Thou Great Creator," "Love Divine" serves as a source for a cento, or pastiche, combined with the final stanza of Fawcett's genuine hymn, "Lo! the bright and rosy morning" (1782), this combination appearing apparently for the first time in the Exeter Unitarian Collection of Psalms and Hymns for Social and Private Worship (1812).

Father! Source of all compassion!
Pure, unbounded grace is thine:
Hail, the God of our salvation!
Praise him for his love divine!

. .. .

Joyfully on earth adore him,
Till in heaven our song we raise:
There [var. Then] enraptur'd fall before him,
Lost in wonder, love, and praise.

More recent times have in general been more respectful of Wesley's original, with the exception of those collections that by policy eschew the second-person singular, replacing "thee" and "thou" with "you" and sometimes introducing other changes in order to maintain meter and rhyme. Another exception is the two-stanza adaptation by Carroll Thomas Andrews (1969) that has been reprinted in several Roman Catholic hymn books set to the tune 'Hyfrydol.' Of the sixteen lines in Andrews' version, only three come directly from Wesley's hymn, and another four or five perhaps owe something to the original, but the theme of the original is lost.

== Popularity ==
Judging by general repute, it is among Wesley's finest: "justly famous and beloved, better known than almost any other hymn of Charles Wesley." Judging by its distribution, it is also among his most successful: by the end of the 19th century, it is found in 15 of the 17 hymn books consulted by the authors of Lyric Studies. On a larger scale, it is found almost universally in general collections of the past century, including not only Methodist and Anglican hymn books and commercial and ecumenical collections, but also hymnals published by Reformed, Presbyterian, Baptist, Brethren, Seventh-day Adventist, Lutheran, Congregationalist, Pentecostal, and Roman Catholic traditions, among others including the Churches of Christ. Specifically, it appears in 1,328 of the North American hymnals indexed by the online Dictionary of North American Hymnology, comparable to Newton's "Amazing Grace" (1,036), Wesley's "O for a Thousand Tongues" (1,249), and Watts' "When I Survey the Wondrous Cross" (1,483), though still well short of Toplady's "Rock of Ages" (2,139) or Wesley's own "Jesu, Lover of my Soul" (2,164).

The hymn, initially sung by small Methodist societies, is now commonly performed at British state occasions, such as the wedding of Prince Charles and Diana and the funeral of Queen Elizabeth II.

== Musical settings ==
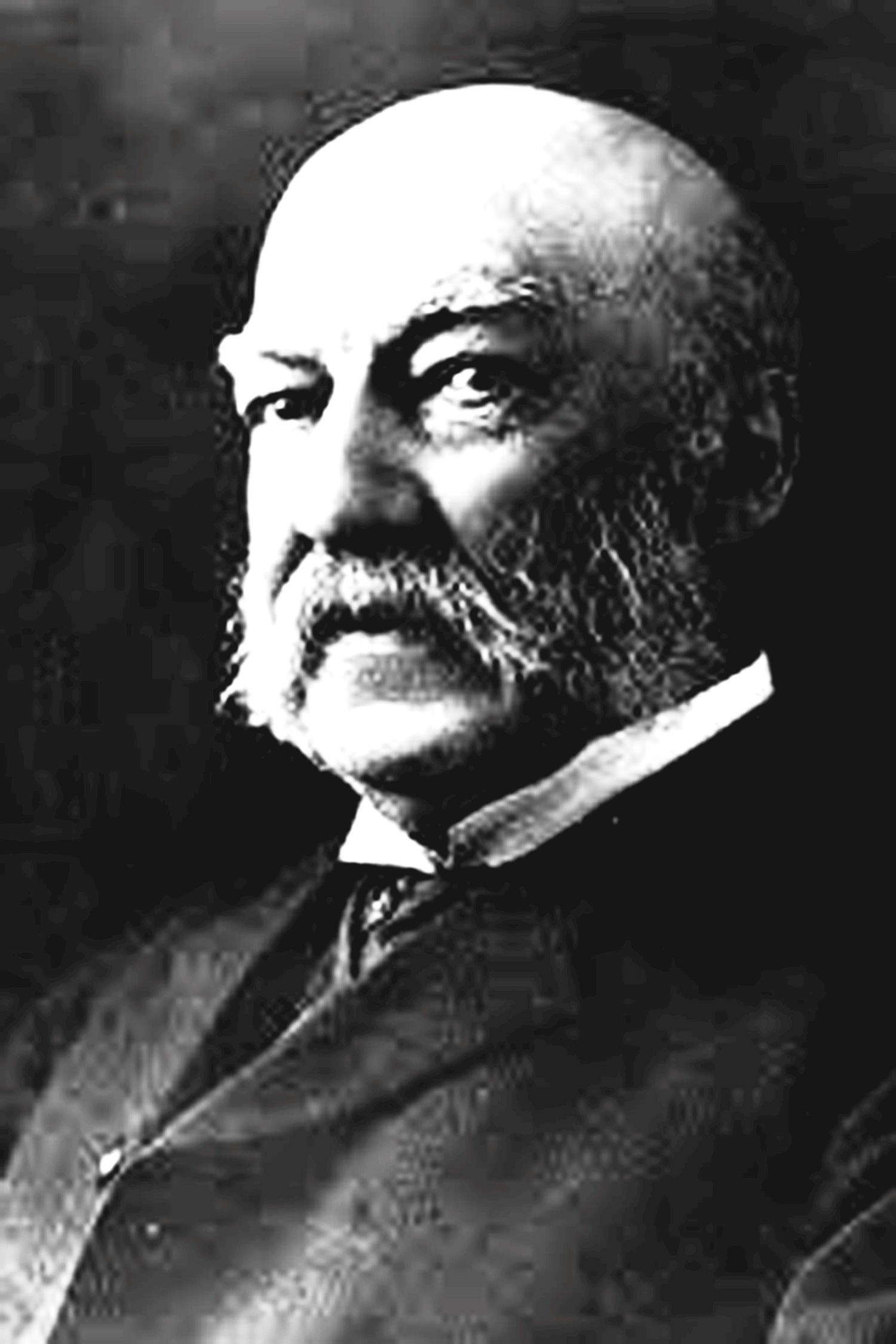
John Zundel, composer of the hymn tune "Beecher"

In current use, the hymn seems to be set most often, particularly in American hymnals, to the tune Beecher by John Zundel (1815–1882; from Christian Heart Songs, 1870); and to the stately Welsh tunes "Hyfrydol" by Rowland Hugh Prichard (1811–1887); "Blaenwern" by William Penfro Rowlands (1860–1937); and "Moriah"—the latter two especially in Great Britain. One of several tunes known, inevitably, as "Love Divine," that by Sir John Stainer, appeared with the hymn first in the 1889 Supplement to Hymns Ancient and Modern and has persisted into several modern British collections; Airedale, by Sir C. V. Stanford, appeared in the 1924 edition of Hymns A & M but seems confined there, as does Bithynia (by Samuel Webbe, 1740–1816; from Webbe's Collection, 1792) in several Methodist collections. There has also been at least one modern attempt to revive the hymn's original tune, "Westminster."

Other settings include

- "Love Divine" - George Le Jeune, 1887
- "Love Divine, All Loves Excelling" - William Lloyd Webber, 1964, (Music Sales)
- "Love Divine, All Loves Excelling" - Howard Goodall, 2000
- "Lugano" (adapted from a melody in Catholic Hymn Tunes, 1849)
- "Exile" (English traditional melody, harm. Martin Shaw)
- "O Gesegnetes Regieren" (from Gnadauer Choralbuch)
- "Falfield" (by Arthur Sullivan)
- "Autumn" (variously described as a "Spanish melody, from Marechio" or as a "Scotch melody") or the "substantially similar" "Jaynes."
- "Tabernacle" (unidentified)
- "O du liebe" (Musikalischer Christenschatz, Basel, 1745)
- "In Babilone" (Dutch trad. melody, harm. by Winfred Douglas, 1918)
- "Ingatestone" (unidentified)
- "Austria" Joseph Haydn; perhaps identical to "Vienna" (unidentified)
- "Jay"
- "Otto" (H.B. Oliphant)
- "Little" (attributed to an "Old Melody")
- "Bethany" (Henry Smart)
- "Lux Eoi" (Arthur Sullivan)
- "Whitefield" (unidentified)
- "Ode to Joy" (Ludwig van Beethoven).
