= Berkshire Community Foundation =

Charity and community foundation based in UK

Berkshire Community Foundation(BCF) is an English charity and community foundation which over the past 40 years has made grants totaling over £20 million to local projects in Berkshire and raised £14 million which is invested in a long term endowment fund.

Berkshire Community Foundation is one of 47 accredited Community Foundations in the UK. These Foundations are all members of the umbrella organisation UK Community Foundations.

HRH Princess Beatrice became patron of BCF on 1 July 2014.

In 2011, Berkshire Community Foundation was selected as one of the beneficiaries of the Prince William and Miss Catherine Middleton Charitable Gift Fund
