= William Penfro Rowlands =

William "Penfro" Rowlands (19 April 1860 – 22 October 1937) was a Welsh schoolteacher and composer.

Rowlands was born at Llys y Frân, Maenclochog, Pembrokeshire (Sir Benfro in the Welsh language, hence his middle name). Probably his best-known composition is the hymn-tune "Blaenwern", composed in 1905 and often used as the setting for Love Divine, All Loves Excelling. As well as being a church musician, Rowlands taught in several schools and was conductor of the Morriston United Choral Society.

He died in Swansea and is buried in Morriston Cemetery, Swansea, plot B11. A memorial stone to the composer was unveiled in March 1998, close to his birthplace.
